= Sunward =

Sunward may refer to:

- Sunward SA 60L Aurora, a Chinese light-sport aircraft by Sunward Aircraft
  - Sunward ST and Sunward STB, amphibious ultralite trike aircraft
- Sunward Cohousing, an intentional community located in Ann Arbor, Michigan, US
- Sunward Aerospace Group, a Canadian manufacturer of model rockets
- MS Sunward (1966), a cruise ship operated by Norwegian Cruise Line 1966–1976
- MS Sunward II, a cruise ship operated by Norwegian Cruise Line 1977–1991
- MS Sunward (1991), a cruise ship operated by Norwegian Cruise Line 1991–1992 and 1992–1993
- Sunward, a location sourcebook for Eclipse Phase role playing game

== See also ==
- Sundwarda, a moth genus in the family Erebidae
