= PowerTrike Evolution =

German ultralight trike

Evolution

General information
- Type: Ultralight trike
- National origin: Germany
- Manufacturer: PowerTrike
- Status: Production completed (2014)

The PowerTrike Evolution is a German ultralight trike, designed and produced by PowerTrike of Mackenbach. The aircraft is supplied as a complete ready-to-fly-aircraft.

As of 2014 the design is no longer indicated as available on the company website.

== Design and development ==
The Evolution was designed to comply with the Fédération Aéronautique Internationale microlight category. It features a cable-braced hang glider-style high-wing, weight-shift controls, a two-seats-in-tandem open cockpit with an integral cockpit fairing, tricycle landing gear with wheel pants and a single engine in pusher configuration.

The aircraft is made from composites, with its double surface wing covered in Dacron sailcloth and supported by a composite monopole pylon. Its 10.5 m (34.4 ft) span wing is supported by a single tube-type kingpost and uses an "A" frame weight-shift control bar. The powerplant is a twin cylinder, liquid-cooled, two-stroke, dual-ignition 50 hp (37 kW) Rotax 582 engine. The main wheel suspension is provided by fibreglass gear legs.

The aircraft has an empty weight of 178 kg (392 lb) and a gross weight of 472.5 kg (1,042 lb) when equipped with a ballistic parachute, giving a useful load of 295 kg (650 lb). With full fuel of 40 litres (8.8 imp gal; 11 US gal) the payload is 266 kg (586 lb).

The aircraft is German DULV certified.

A number of different wings can be fitted to the basic carriage, including the Bautek Pico and the Cosmos Chronos in wing areas of 12 m^{2} (130 sq ft) and 14 m^{2} (150 sq ft).

== Operational history ==
The Evolution has been flown to World Microlight Championships and also European Microlight Championship honours.

== Specifications (Evolution) ==
Data from Bayerl and PowerTrike

General characteristics

- Crew: one
- Capacity: one passenger
- Wingspan: 10.5 m (34 ft 5 in)
- Height: 2.321 m (7 ft 7 in)
- Wing area: 12 m^{2} (130 sq ft)
- Empty weight: 178 kg (392 lb)
- Gross weight: 472.5 kg (1,042 lb)
- Fuel capacity: 40 litres (8.8 imp gal; 11 US gal)
- Powerplant: 1 × Rotax 582 twin cylinder, liquid-cooled, two stroke aircraft engine, 48 kW (64 hp)
- Propellers: 4-bladed Junkers 170 composite, 1.70 m (5 ft 7 in) diameter

Performance

- Maximum speed: 128 km/h (80 mph, 69 kn)
- Cruise speed: 110 km/h (68 mph, 59 kn)
- Stall speed: 45 km/h (28 mph, 24 kn)
- Rate of climb: 5 m/s (980 ft/min)
- Wing loading: 39.4 kg/m^{2} (8.1 lb/sq ft)
