= Loravia LOR 75 =

French aircraft engine

- Type: Aircraft engine
- National origin: France
- Manufacturer: Loravia

The Loravia LOR 75 is a French aircraft engine, designed and produced by Loravia of Yutz for use in ultralight aircraft. It was introduced in 2009.

By March 2018, the engine was no longer advertised on the company website and seems to be out of production.

== Design and development ==
The LOR 75 is a three-cylinder four-stroke, in-line, 998 cc (60.9 cu in) displacement, liquid-cooled, automotive conversion petrol engine design, with a toothed poly V belt reduction drive with reduction ratios of 2.46 and 3.72:1. It employs electronic ignition and produces 75 hp (56 kW) at 6000 rpm, with a compression ratio of 10.5.

== Applications ==
- Best Off Skyranger
- Gdecouv'R trike
- Rans S-6 Coyote II

== Specifications (LOR 75) ==
Data from Tacke

=== General characteristics ===
- Type: Three-cylinder, four stroke aircraft engine
- Bore: 71 mm (2.8 in)
- Stroke: 84 mm (3.3 in)
- Displacement: 998 cc (60.9 cu in)
- Dry weight: 75 kg (165.3 lb)

=== Components ===
- Fuel type: petrol
- Cooling system: liquid
- Reduction gear: toothed poly V belt

=== Performance ===
- Power output: 75 hp (56 kW)

== See also ==
Related lists

- List of aircraft engines
