= Sky-Bike =

Sky Bike or Sky-bike may refer to:

- Personal Flight Sky-Bike, an American powered paraglider design
- Personal Flight Sky-Bike Trike, an American powered parachute design
