= General Aviation Design Bureau T-2 Maverick =

Ukrainian ultralight trike

T-2 Maverick

General information
- Type: Ultralight trike
- National origin: Ukraine
- Manufacturer: General Aviation Design Bureau of Ukraine
- Status: In production (2011)

History
- Manufactured: 1995-present
- Introduction date: 1995

The General Aviation Design Bureau T-2 Maverick is a Ukrainian ultralight trike, designed and produced by the General Aviation Design Bureau of Ukraine, based in Kyiv. The aircraft is supplied as a complete ready-to-fly-aircraft.

== Design and development ==
The T-2 was produced starting in 1995 as a trainer for western markets under subcontract, but is now sold under the General Aviation Design Bureau's own name.

The T-2 Maverick was designed to comply with the Fédération Aéronautique Internationale microlight category, including the category's maximum gross weight of 450 kg (992 lb). The aircraft has a maximum gross weight of 450 to 540 kg (992 to 1,190 lb) depending on the version. It features a cable-braced hang glider-style high-wing, weight-shift controls, a two-seats-in-side-by-side configuration open cockpit with two separate cockpit fairings, tricycle landing gear and a single engine in pusher configuration.

The aircraft's structure is made from tubing, with its double surface wing covered in Dacron sailcloth. Its 10.2 m (33.5 ft) span wing is supported by a single tube-type kingpost and uses an "A" frame weight-shift control bar. Powerplants available are the twin cylinder, air-cooled, two-stroke, dual-ignition 50 hp (37 kW) Rotax 503 engine, the liquid-cooled 64 hp (48 kW) Rotax 582 engine or the four cylinder, air and liquid-cooled, four-stroke, dual-ignition 80 hp (60 kW) Rotax 912UL engine.

The aircraft has an empty weight of 190 kg (419 lb) and a gross weight of 450 to 540 kg (992 to 1,190 lb) depending on the version, giving a useful load of 260 to 350 kg (573 to 772 lb). With full fuel of 30 litres (6.6 imp gal; 7.9 US gal) the payload is 238 to 328 kg (525 to 723 lb).

Two different wings have been supplied as standard, initially the Maverick 14.7 and, since 2000, the larger Maverick II with a wing area of 16.5 m^{2} (178 sq ft).

== Specifications (T-2 with Maverick II wing) ==
Data from Bayerl

General characteristics

- Crew: one
- Capacity: one passenger
- Wingspan: 10.2 m (33 ft 6 in)
- Wing area: 16.5 m^{2} (178 sq ft)
- Empty weight: 190 kg (419 lb)
- Gross weight: 450 kg (992 lb)
- Fuel capacity: 30 litres (6.6 imp gal; 7.9 US gal)
- Powerplant: 1 × Rotax 582 twin cylinder, liquid-cooled, two stroke aircraft engine, 48 kW (64 hp)
- Propellers: 3-bladed composite

Performance

- Maximum speed: 130 km/h (81 mph, 70 kn)
- Cruise speed: 85 km/h (53 mph, 46 kn)
- Stall speed: 55 km/h (34 mph, 30 kn)
- Rate of climb: 4.0 m/s (790 ft/min)
- Wing loading: 27.3 kg/m^{2} (5.6 lb/sq ft)
