= PowerTrike II =

German ultralight trike

General information
- Type: Ultralight trike
- National origin: Germany
- Manufacturer: PowerTrike
- Status: Production completed (2014)

The PowerTrike II is a German ultralight trike, designed and produced by PowerTrike of Mackenbach. The aircraft is supplied as a complete ready-to-fly-aircraft.

As of 2014 the design is no longer indicated as available on the company website.

== Design and development ==
The aircraft was designed to comply with the Fédération Aéronautique Internationale microlight category, including the category's maximum gross weight of 450 kg (992 lb). The aircraft has a maximum gross weight of 450 kg (992 lb). It features a cable-braced hang glider-style high-wing, weight-shift controls, a two-seats-in-tandem open cockpit with a cockpit fairing, tricycle landing gear with optional wheel pants and a single engine in pusher configuration.

The aircraft is made from bolted-together aluminum tubing, with its double surface wing covered in Dacron sailcloth. Its 10.5 m (34.4 ft) span Bautek Pico L wing is supported by a single tube-type kingpost and uses an "A" frame weight-shift control bar. The wing is mounted to a bi-pole type pylon, plus a front strut, which provides additional rigidity and strength. The powerplant is a twin cylinder, liquid-cooled, two-stroke, dual-ignition 64 hp (48 kW) Rotax 582 engine or a four stroke95 hp (71 kW) BWM 1150 motorcycle engine.

The aircraft has an empty weight of 198 kg (437 lb) and a gross weight of 450 kg (992 lb), giving a useful load of 252 kg (556 lb). With full fuel of 54 litres (12 imp gal; 14 US gal) the payload is 213 kg (470 lb).

== Variants ==
II Standard
Base model with a cockpit fairing
II Deluxe
Fully equipped model with cockpit fairing and wheel pants

== Specifications (II Deluxe) ==
Data from Bayerl

General characteristics

- Crew: one
- Capacity: one passenger
- Wingspan: 10.5 m (34 ft 5 in)
- Wing area: 14.9 m^{2} (160 sq ft)
- Empty weight: 198 kg (437 lb)
- Gross weight: 450 kg (992 lb)
- Fuel capacity: 54 litres (12 imp gal; 14 US gal)
- Powerplant: 1 × BMW 1150 four stroke motorcycle engine, 71 kW (95 hp)
- Propellers: 3-bladed composite

Performance

- Maximum speed: 130 km/h (81 mph, 70 kn)
- Cruise speed: 100 km/h (62 mph, 54 kn)
- Stall speed: 60 km/h (37 mph, 32 kn)
- Rate of climb: 5 m/s (980 ft/min)
- Wing loading: 30.2 kg/m^{2} (6.2 lb/sq ft)
