= MA 30 =

MA 30 may refer to:

- FUL MA 30 Graffiti, a German ultralight trike design
- Massachusetts Route 30, an American road.
