= PowerTrike =

German aircraft manufacturer

PowerTrike GmbH
- Company type: Privately held company
- Industry: Aerospace
- Headquarters: Mackenbach, Germany
- Products: Ultralight trikes, powered parachutes, kit aircraft
- Website: www.powertrike.de

PowerTrike GmbH is a German aircraft manufacturer based in Mackenbach. At one time the company specialized in the design and manufacture of ultralight trikes and powered parachutes, but today produces just the Best Off Skyranger kit aircraft as the SkyRanger SW.

By November 2014 the company was operating under the name Volksflugzeug GmbH.

== Aircraft ==
Summary of aircraft built by PowerTrike and Volksflugzeug
Model name	First flight	Number built	Type
PowerTrike Evolution			Ultralight trike
PowerTrike II			Ultralight trike
PowerTrike Light			Ultralight trike and powered parachute
Volksflugzeug SkyRanger SW			Ultralight aircraft
