= PowerTrike Light =

German ultralight trike

Light

General information
- Type: Ultralight trike and powered parachute
- National origin: Germany
- Manufacturer: PowerTrike
- Status: Production completed (2014)

The PowerTrike Light is a German ultralight trike and powered parachute, designed and produced by PowerTrike of Mackenbach. The aircraft is supplied as a complete ready-to-fly-aircraft.

The same basic airframe is used to mount either a hang glider or paraglider wing and is known as the Light-Delta and Light-Para, respectively, in those configurations.

As of 2014 the design is no longer indicated as available on the company website.

== Design and development ==
The aircraft was designed as an easy to pack nanotrike to comply with the Fédération Aéronautique Internationale microlight category and the US FAR 103 Ultralight Vehicles rules, including the category's maximum empty weight of 254 lb (115 kg). It features a cable-braced hang glider-style high-wing, weight-shift controls, a single-seat open cockpit without a cockpit fairing, tricycle landing gear and a single engine in pusher configuration.

The aircraft is made from bolted-together aluminum tubing, with its double surface wing covered in Dacron sailcloth. Its 9.7 m (31.8 ft) span Bautek Pico L wing is supported by a single tube-type kingpost and uses an "A" frame weight-shift control bar. The powerplant is the single cylinder, air-cooled, two-stroke, 28 hp (21 kW) Hirth F33 engine or the Briggs & Stratton twin cylinder, air-cooled, four-stroke 30 hp (22 kW) engine. With the Briggs & Stratton engine and Pico L wing the aircraft has an empty weight of 120 kg (265 lb) and a gross weight of 220 kg (485 lb), giving a useful load of 100 kg (220 lb). With full fuel of 20 litres (4.4 imp gal; 5.3 US gal) the payload is 86 kg (190 lb).

A number of different wings can be fitted to the basic carriage, including the standard 17.2 m^{2} (185 sq ft) area Bautek Bico and the 12.2 m^{2} (131 sq ft) area Bautek Pico L, which is only used with the higher output Briggs & Stratton powerplant. Any hang glider wing with a sufficient gross weight capacity can also be used. The aircraft can easily be disassembled and folded to fit inside an automobile, with the wing carried on a roof rack.

== Operational history ==
The PowerTrike Light has proven popular with hang glider pilots transitioning to powered flying because they can use their existing hang glider wing mounted on the Light.

== Variants ==
Light-Delta
Version with hang glider wing
Light-Para
Version with paraglider wing

== Specifications (Light with Bautek Pico L wing) ==
Data from Bayerl

General characteristics

- Crew: one
- Wingspan: 9.7 m (31 ft 10 in)
- Wing area: 12.2 m^{2} (131 sq ft)
- Empty weight: 120 kg (265 lb)
- Gross weight: 220 kg (485 lb)
- Fuel capacity: 20 litres (4.4 imp gal; 5.3 US gal)
- Powerplant: 1 × Briggs & Stratton two cylinder, air-cooled, four stroke engine, 22 kW (30 hp)
- Propellers: 3-bladed composite

Performance

- Maximum speed: 120 km/h (75 mph, 65 kn)
- Cruise speed: 90 km/h (56 mph, 49 kn)
- Stall speed: 45 km/h (28 mph, 24 kn)
- Rate of climb: 3.2 m/s (630 ft/min)
- Wing loading: 22.7 kg/m^{2} (4.6 lb/sq ft)
