= NF2 =

NF2, NF-2, or similar, may refer to:

== Transportation ==
- De Havilland Venom NF.2, a British post-war night fighter aircraft
- Nickel & Foucard NF-2 Asterix, a French homebuilt aircraft

== Biology ==
- Neurofibromatosis type II, an inherited disease
- Merlin (protein) or Neurofibromin 2, a cytoskeletal protein
- Nitrogen difluoride a chemical radical with formula •NF_{2}
