= Aeromarine Merlin =

American homebuilt aircraft

Merlin
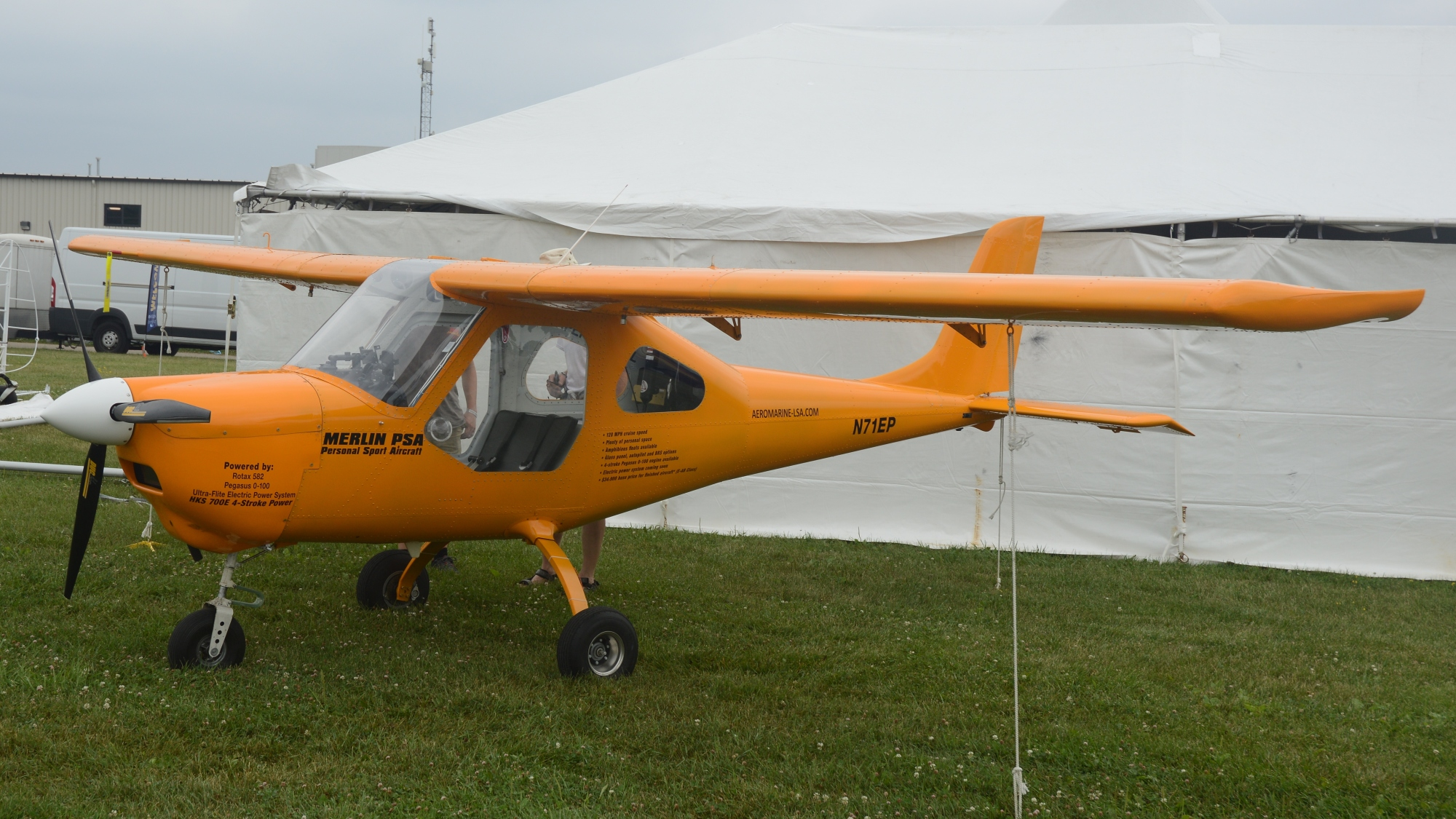

General information
- Type: Homebuilt aircraft
- National origin: United States
- Manufacturer: Aeromarine LSA
- Status: In production (2016)
- Number built: One

History
- Introduction date: 2016

The Aeromarine Merlin is an American homebuilt aircraft that was designed by Czech Aircraft Works and is produced by Aeromarine LSA of South Lakeland Airport, Florida, introduced at the Sport Aviation Expo in 2016. The aircraft is supplied as a kit, for amateur construction.

== Design and development ==
The aircraft features a cantilever high-wing, a single-seat enclosed cabin, fixed tricycle landing gear and a single engine in tractor configuration.

The aircraft is made from aluminum sheet, with the engine cowling made from composite material. The design employs access doors that hinge vertically and a conventional low tail. Its 25.6 ft (7.8 m) span wing mounts flaps. The cabin width is 27.5 in (70 cm). The standard engine used is the 64 hp (48 kW) Rotax 582 twin-cylinder two-stroke powerplant.

The manufacturer estimates the construction time from the supplied kit as two weeks at the factory completion center.

While initially offered as an amateur-built kit, future development plans include an electric powered version and a light-sport aircraft version that will be sold ready-to-fly.

== Development ==
The Merlin originated from a Czech-designed single-seat aircraft platform later adapted for the American experimental and sport aviation market through Aeromarine-LSA.

Aeromarine-LSA positioned the aircraft as an affordable alternative to increasingly expensive light sport aircraft, offering rapid-build kit construction supported through factory-assisted builder programs.

== Variants ==
Merlin-PSA
Initial "personal sport aircraft" version powered by a Rotax 582 two-stroke engine for the US Experimental Amateur-Built category.

It features an enclosed cockpit, aluminum construction, flaps, baggage capacity, and engine options including Rotax and Aeromarine proprietary powerplants.

The aircraft has been promoted as a low-cost entry into sport aviation compared with conventional certified or light sport aircraft.

=== Merlin Lite ===
The Merlin Lite is a redesigned ultralight variant developed to comply with U.S. Federal Aviation Administration Part 103 ultralight regulations.

Unlike many ultralight aircraft, the Merlin Lite features:

- enclosed cockpit
- all-metal construction
- optional glass instrumentation
- hydraulic brakes
- self-launching motor-glider capability

The design emphasizes low drag and short-field capability.

=== Merlin II ===
The Merlin II is a larger and more capable derivative intended to extend the Merlin concept into a higher-performance category.

Aeromarine has described the Merlin II as featuring increased capability, additional powerplant options, and expanded utility compared with the original Merlin.

=== Electrolite ===
The Electrolite is an electric propulsion experimental derivative based on the Merlin Lite airframe concept.

The aircraft was developed as an exploration of electric recreational flight within the ultralight category.

== See also ==
- Experimental aircraft
- Light-sport aircraft
- Ultralight aviation
- Federal Aviation Regulations Part 103

== Specifications (Merlin-PSA) ==
Data from Manufacturer

General characteristics

- Crew: one
- Length: 17 ft 5 in (5.31 m)
- Wingspan: 25 ft 7 in (7.80 m)
- Height: 6 ft 11 in (2.11 m)
- Empty weight: 396 lb (180 kg)
- Gross weight: 660 lb (299 kg)
- Powerplant: 1 × Rotax 582 twin cylinder, liquid-cooled, two-stroke aircraft engine, 64 hp (48 kW)
- Propellers: 3-bladed ground adjustable

Performance

- Cruise speed: 112 mph (180 km/h, 97 kn)
- Stall speed: 38 mph (61 km/h, 33 kn) flaps down
- Never exceed speed: 150 mph (240 km/h, 130 kn)
