= S-Wing Swing =

Ultralight aircraft

Swing

General information
- Type: Ultralight aircraft and Light-sport aircraft
- National origin: Czech Republic
- Manufacturer: S-Wing VSLX R.O., Hluboká nad Vltavou
- Number built: 30 by 2008

The S-Wing Swing (called the S-wing Aircraft Swing 06 in the United States) is a high-wing, two-seat, single-engine ultralight/light sport aircraft designed and built in the Czech Republic.

== Design and development ==
The Swing is a conventionally laid out ultralight/LSA aircraft with a single engine and high wing. The composite parts are built using a vacuum technology producing a sandwich structure. The fuel tank, engine mount and lift struts use melamine composites. The constant chord wings, carrying 3° of dihedral, are built from GRP composite with hard leading edges and fabric elsewhere. Each wing has a single lift strut with a short auxiliary strut joining it near the wing. The wings carry GRP mass-balanced ailerons and three-position plain flaps.

The fin of the Swing has a strongly swept leading edge and a nearly upright rudder. Early versions had an all moving, though braced, tailplane mounted about halfway up the fin but more recently this has been replaced by a fuselage mounted tailplane. Narrow near the tail, the fuselage increases in diameter to the cabin, placed under the wings. Cockpit width is 132 cm (52.0 in). The cockpit features bulged, glazed doors to improve visibility and room. Dual controls are standard, the seating side by side.

The early Swings were powered by either 60 kW (80 hp) Rotax 912 UL flat-four engine or the two-stroke twin-cylinder 49 kW (65 hp) Rotax 582 UL, driving propellers with two or more blades. Current (2010) aircraft have the 74 kW (99 hp) Rotax 912 ULS flat-four with a two-bladed propeller.

The Swing has a fixed undercarriage, which may be of either tricycle or tailwheel configuration.

The aircraft has been accepted in the United States as a special light-sport aircraft.

== Operational history ==
Swings were produced for the Czech market until around 1997. Eleven had been sold by the time it became available in the United States from 2007. Thirteen had been produced by mid-2010. Three appear on the European (excluding Russian) civil registers, all in the Czech Republic.

== Specifications ==
Data from Jane's All the World's Aircraft 2010/11

General characteristics

- Crew: one
- Capacity: one passenger
- Length: 6.29 m (20 ft 8 in)
- Wingspan: 10.20 m (33 ft 6 in)
- Height: 2.40 m (7 ft 10 in)
- Wing area: 12.90 m^{2} (138.9 sq ft)
- Aspect ratio: 8.1
- Empty weight: 296 kg (653 lb)
- Max takeoff weight: 575 kg (1,268 lb)
- Fuel capacity: 60 L (13.2 Imp ga, 15.8 US gal)
- Powerplant: 1 × Rotax 912 ULS flat 4-cylinder piston, air- and water-cooled, 73.5 kW (98.6 hp)
- Propellers: WoodComp two-blade, ground-adjustable pitch

Performance

- Cruise speed: 161 km/h (100 mph, 87 kn)
- Stall speed: 65 km/h (40 mph, 35 kn)
- Never exceed speed: 201 km/h (125 mph, 109 kn)
- Range: 804 km (500 mi, 434 nmi)
- Service ceiling: 5,270 m (17,290 ft) service
- Rate of climb: 6.5 m/s (1,280 ft/min)

Avionics

- Day VFR standard
