= General Aviation Design Bureau T-32 Maverick =

Ukrainian ultralight trike

T-32 Maverick

General information
- Type: Ultralight trike
- National origin: Ukraine
- Manufacturer: General Aviation Design Bureau of Ukraine
- Status: Under development (2011)
- Number built: at least one

The General Aviation Design Bureau T-32 Maverick is a Ukrainian ultralight trike under development by the General Aviation Design Bureau of Ukraine, based in Kyiv. The aircraft is intended to be supplied as a kit for amateur construction or as a complete ready-to-fly-aircraft.

The company has constructed trike designs for other manufacturers under contract in the past, but the T-32 is their own design.

== Design and development ==
As a three-seat trike the T-32 Maverick does not comply with the Fédération Aéronautique Internationale microlight or the US light-sport aircraft categories, which are both limited to two seats, but may fit some country's amateur-built aircraft rules.

The T-32 Maverick features a cable-braced hang glider-style high-wing, weight-shift controls, a three-seat open cockpit, with the pilot sitting in front and a two-seat bench in the back, with a cockpit fairing. It can be mounted on tricycle landing gear or floats and has a single engine in pusher configuration.

The aircraft is made from bolted-together aluminum tubing, with its double surface wing covered in Dacron sailcloth. Its 10.2 m (33.5 ft) span wing is supported by a single tube-type kingpost and uses an "A" frame weight-shift control bar. The aircraft has many powerplant options, including the twin cylinder, liquid-cooled, two-stroke, dual-ignition 64 hp (48 kW) Rotax 582 engine, the four cylinder, air and liquid-cooled, four-stroke, dual-ignition 80 hp (60 kW) Rotax 912UL or 100 hp (75 kW) Rotax 912ULS engine and the turbocharged 115 hp (86 kW) Rotax 914. Automotive conversion engines of 60 to 110 hp (45 to 82 kW) can also be fitted.

The aircraft has an empty weight of 280 kg (617 lb) and a gross weight of 640 kg (1,411 lb), giving a useful load of 360 kg (794 lb). With full fuel of 60 litres (13 imp gal; 16 US gal) the payload is 316 kg (697 lb).

== Specifications (T-32 Maverick) ==
Data from Bayerl

General characteristics

- Crew: one
- Capacity: two passengers on a bench seat
- Wingspan: 10.2 m (33 ft 6 in)
- Wing area: 16.5 m^{2} (178 sq ft)
- Empty weight: 280 kg (617 lb)
- Fuel capacity: 60 litres (13 imp gal; 16 US gal)
- Powerplant: 1 × Rotax 912UL four cylinder, liquid and air-cooled, four stroke aircraft engine, 60 kW (80 hp)
- Propellers: 3-bladed composite

Performance

- Maximum speed: 140 km/h (87 mph, 76 kn)
- Cruise speed: 100 km/h (62 mph, 54 kn)
- Stall speed: 55 km/h (34 mph, 30 kn)
- Rate of climb: 3 m/s (590 ft/min)
- Wing loading: 38.8 kg/m^{2} (7.9 lb/sq ft)
