= Daniel Schäffner =

German politician (born 1981)

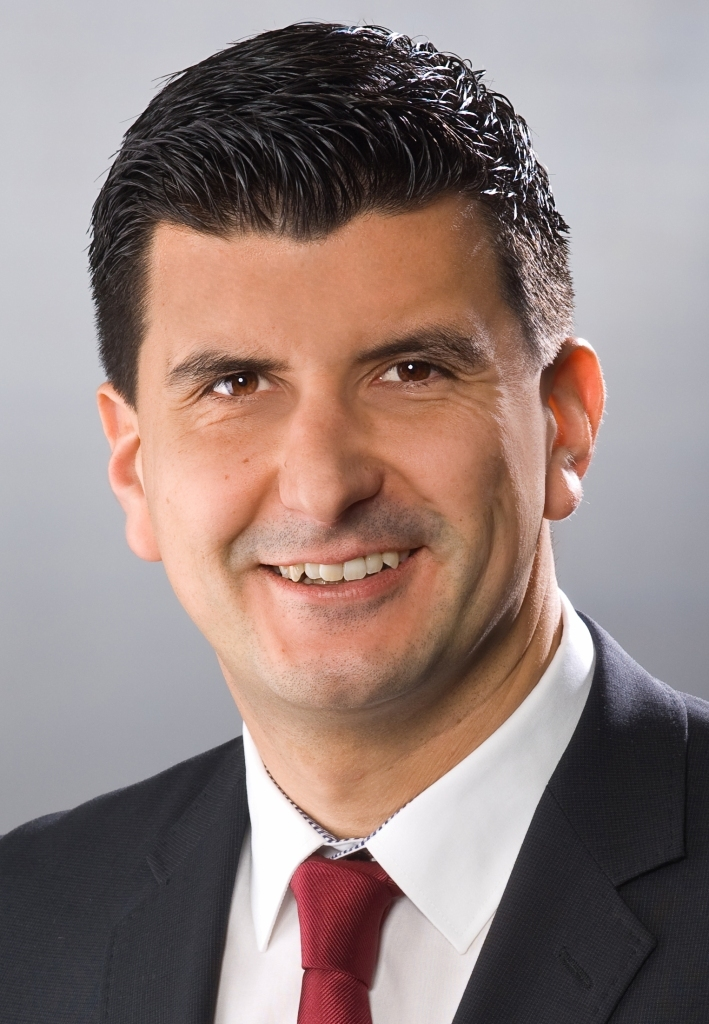
- Schäffner in 2013

Member of the Landtag of Rhineland-Palatinate
- Incumbent
- Assumed office 18 February 2014
- Preceded by: Margit Mohr
- Constituency: Kaiserslautern-Land (2016–2021)

Personal details
- Born: 10 September 1981 (age 44)
- Party: Social Democratic Party (since 1998)

Daniel Schäffner (born 10 September 1981) is a German politician serving as a member of the Landtag of Rhineland-Palatinate since 2014. He has served as mayor of Mackenbach since 2019.
