= Ehroflug Coach II S =

Swiss ultralight aircraft

Coach II S

General information
- Type: Ultralight aircraft
- National origin: Switzerland
- Manufacturer: Ehroflug
- Designer: Egon Scheibe
- Status: In production
- Number built: 15 (1998)

History
- Manufactured: 1989-present
- Introduction date: 1989

The Ehroflug Coach II S is a Swiss ultralight aircraft, designed by Egon Scheibe and produced by Ehroflug of Altnau. It was introduced in 1989. The aircraft is supplied as plans, as a kit for amateur construction or as a complete ready-to-fly-aircraft.

== Design and development ==
The aircraft was designed to comply with the Fédération Aéronautique Internationale microlight rules. It features a strut-braced parasol wing a two-seats-in-side-by-side configuration open cockpit, fixed conventional landing gear and a single engine in tractor configuration.

The aircraft fuselage is made from welded steel tubing, with the wing built from aluminium tubing with wooden ribs. The airframe is covered in doped aircraft fabric. Its 11.34 m (37.2 ft) span wing has an area of 15 m^{2} (160 sq ft) and is supported by cabane struts, V-struts and jury struts. The wings are quickly detachable for storage. Standard engines available are the 70 hp (52 kW) Sauer 2.1 four-stroke Volkswagen air-cooled engine and the 64 hp (48 kW) Rotax 582 two-stroke powerplant.

While still in production in 2015, the aircraft was only built on request.

== Specifications (Coach II S) ==
Data from Bayerl and Purdy

General characteristics

- Crew: one
- Capacity: one passenger
- Wingspan: 11.34 m (37 ft 2 in)
- Wing area: 15 m^{2} (160 sq ft)
- Empty weight: 230 kg (507 lb)
- Gross weight: 450 kg (992 lb)
- Fuel capacity: 45 litres (9.9 imp gal; 12 US gal)
- Powerplant: 1 × Sauer 2.1 four cylinder, air-cooled, four stroke aircraft engine, 70 kW (94 hp)
- Propellers: 2-bladed wooden

Performance

- Maximum speed: 125 km/h (78 mph, 67 kn)
- Cruise speed: 100 km/h (62 mph, 54 kn)
- Stall speed: 50 km/h (31 mph, 27 kn)
- g limits: +5/-3
- Rate of climb: 2 m/s (390 ft/min)
- Wing loading: 30 kg/m^{2} (6.1 lb/sq ft)
