= Aerosette MH-46 Eclipse =

MH-46 Eclipse

General information
- Type: Ultralight aircraft
- National origin: Czech Republic
- Manufacturer: Aerosette
- Status: In production

History
- Introduction date: 2002

The Aerosette MH-46 Eclipse is a Czech ultralight aircraft, designed and produced by Aerosette of Chrastava. The aircraft is supplied as a complete ready-to-fly-aircraft.

== Design and development ==
The MH-46 was designed to comply with the Fédération Aéronautique Internationale microlight rules and intended for personal use and flight training. It features a strut-braced high-wing, a two-seats-in-side-by-side configuration enclosed cockpit, fixed tricycle landing gear and a single engine in tractor configuration.

The aircraft is made from composites. Its 9.71 m (31.9 ft) span wing is supported by a single strut on each side. Standard engines available are the 64 hp (48 kW) Rotax 582 two-stroke and the 100 hp (75 kW) Rotax 912ULS four-stroke powerplant. The cockpit was designed for comfort and is 1.2 m (47 in) wide at the pilot's elbow.

== Specifications (MH-46 Eclipse) ==
Data from Bayerl, Tacke and Aerosette

General characteristics

- Crew: one
- Capacity: one passenger
- Length: 6.34 m (20 ft 10 in)
- Wingspan: 9.71 m (31 ft 10 in)
- Height: 2.18 m (7 ft 2 in)
- Wing area: 11.5 m^{2} (124 sq ft)
- Empty weight: 285 kg (628 lb)
- Gross weight: 472.5 kg (1,042 lb)
- Fuel capacity: 130 litres (29 imp gal; 34 US gal)
- Powerplant: 1 × Rotax 912ULS four cylinder, liquid and air-cooled, four stroke, 75 kW (101 hp)

Performance

- Maximum speed: 250 km/h (160 mph, 130 kn)
- Cruise speed: 220 km/h (140 mph, 120 kn)
- Stall speed: 65 km/h (40 mph, 35 kn) flaps down
- Never exceed speed: 298 km/h (185 mph, 161 kn)
- g limits: +4/-2
- Rate of climb: 8.7 m/s (1,710 ft/min)
