= Personal Flight =

American aircraft manufacturer

- Company type: Privately held company
- Industry: Aerospace
- Defunct: December 2003
- Fate: Out of business
- Headquarters: Chelan, Washington, United States
- Products: Kit aircraft
- Website: www.personalflight.com - former location

Personal Flight was an American aircraft manufacturer based in Kent, Washington and later Chelan, Washington. The company specialized in the design and manufacture of ultralight trikes, paramotors and powered parachutes in the form of kits for amateur construction including for the US FAR 103 Ultralight Vehicles rules.

The company went out of business at the end of 2003.

The company produced a diverse series of ultralight aircraft in the late 1990s, included the Personal Flight Sky-Tender, an ultralight trike flying boat, the Personal Flight Sky-Bike, a paramotor and the conversion of that model to a powered parachute, by the addition of a wheeled carriage as the Personal Flight Sky-Bike Trike.

Personal Flight also acted as an importer and dealer for La Mouette hang gliders and Cosmos ULM ultralight trikes.

== Aircraft ==
Summary of aircraft built by Personal Flight
Model name	First flight	Number built	Type
Personal Flight Sky-Bike			paramotor
Personal Flight Sky-Bike Trike			powered parachute
Personal Flight Sky-Tender			ultralight trike flying boat
