= Y2Fly Seahawk =

American ultralight trike aircraft

General information
- Type: Ultralight trike flying boat
- National origin: Italy
- Manufacturer: Y2Fly
- Status: Production completed

The Y2Fly Seahawk is an Italian design, American imported amphibious flying boat ultralight trike that was designed and produced in Italy and imported to the US by Y2Fly and Lucian Bartosik.of Point Harbor, North Carolina (Now Lakewood, Ohio). The aircraft was supplied as a completed aircraft.

== Design and development ==
The Seahawk features a choice of wings cable-braced hang glider-style high wing, weight-shift controls, a two-seats-in-tandem, open cockpit, a trimaran hull which was designed and built in Italy and a single engine in pusher configuration.

The most comprehensive book written about trikes and flight training, including how to fly the Seahawk, is "Trikes, The Flex-Wing Flyers, available from Lucian Bartosik Cost is $30 for the 265 page book. The aircraft hull is made from fiberglass, with stainless steel fittings. The wing and its supporting structure are made from bolted-together aluminum tubing, with the single surface wing covered in Dacron sailcloth and supported by a single tube-type kingpost. The Seahawk uses an "A" frame control bar for weight-shift control. The hull was carefully designed to account for the inherent lack of pitch control that trikes have while on the water. It was designed to reduce porpoising and water spray being thrown into the crew seats and propeller. The hull also provides lift in flight and allows flight at reduced power and fuel consumption. The retractable landing gear is of tricycle configuration and is mechanically retracted by a lever located next to the pilot. The nosewheel retracts in front of the bow of the hull, while the main landing gear retracts beside the tri-hull. The standard powerplant supplied was the twin cylinder, two-stroke, liquid-cooled 64 hp (48 kW) Rotax 582 aircraft engine.

== Specifications (Seahawk) ==
Data from Cliche

General characteristics

- Powerplant: 1 × Rotax 582 twin cylinder, two-stroke, liquid-cooled aircraft engine, 64 hp (48 kW)
