= Guépard II XJ01 =

Belgian autogyro

General information
- Type: Autogyro
- National origin: Belgium
- Manufacturer: Guépard II Team
- Designer: Joel Tilquin
- Status: Production completed (2015)

History
- Manufactured: 2011-15
- Introduction date: 2011
- First flight: 28 May 2009
- Developed from: Guépard AX 02

The Guépard II XJ01 (transl. Cheetah) is a Belgian autogyro that was designed by Joel Tilquin and produced by Guépard II Team of Boncelles, first flown on 28 May 2009 at the Bois-de-la-Pierre fly-in. Now out of production, when it was available the aircraft was supplied as a kit for amateur construction.

== Design and development ==
The XJ01 is a development of the Guépard AX 02 that was designed by Xavier Averso in the 1980s and first offered as plans in 1987. Tilquin decided not to publish plans and instead offer the updated version as a kit, starting in 2011. The kit provided by Guépard II Team included the fuselage frame but did not include the rotor system, propeller, engine or instruments.

The company seems to have gone out of business at the end of 2015 and kit production ended.

The design features a single main rotor, a single-seat open cockpit without a windshield, tricycle landing gear without wheel pants and a twin-cylinder, liquid-cooled, two-stroke, dual-ignition 64 hp (48 kW) Rotax 582 engine in pusher configuration.

The aircraft fuselage is made from bolted-together aluminum tubing. Its two-bladed rotor has a diameter of 6.9 m (22.6 ft) and a chord of 22 cm (8.7 in). The aircraft has a typical empty weight of 172 kg (379 lb) and a gross weight of 300 kg (661 lb), giving a useful load of 128 kg (282 lb). With full fuel of 50 litres (11 imp gal; 13 US gal) the payload for the pilot and baggage is 92 kg (203 lb).

== Specifications (XJ01) ==
Data from Tacke

General characteristics

- Crew: one
- Empty weight: 172 kg (379 lb)
- Gross weight: 300 kg (661 lb)
- Fuel capacity: 50 litres (11 imp gal; 13 US gal)
- Powerplant: 1 × Rotax 582 twin cylinder, liquid-cooled, two stroke aircraft engine, 48 kW (64 hp)
- Main rotor diameter: 6.9 m (22 ft 8 in)
- Main rotor area: 37 m^{2} (400 sq ft)
- Propellers: 2-bladed fixed pitch

Performance

- Maximum speed: 145 km/h (90 mph, 78 kn)
- Cruise speed: 105 km/h (65 mph, 57 kn)
- Rate of climb: 3.5 m/s (690 ft/min)
- Disk loading: 8.1 kg/m^{2} (1.7 lb/sq ft)

== See also ==
- List of rotorcraft
