= Buckeye Eclipse =

Eclipse

General information
- Type: Ultralight trike
- National origin: United States
- Manufacturer: Buckeye Industries
- Status: Production completed

The Buckeye Eclipse and Buckeye Endeavor are a family of American two-seat flying wing ultralight trikes that was designed and produced by Buckeye Industries. The aircraft were supplied fully assembled.

== Design and development ==
Buckeye Industries was well known in the US ultralight business as one of the leading manufacturers of powered parachutes in the 1980s and 90s. The company decided to expand their line with the introduction of a line of trikes in the late 1990s. The aircraft were not strong sellers and the company went out of business in the mid-2000s.

The Eclipse features a cable-braced hang glider-style high-wing, weight-shift controls, a single-seat, open cockpit, tricycle landing gear and a single engine in pusher configuration. Factory-supplied standard equipment included dual controls and electronic flight instruments. Optional equipment included a fiberglass cockpit fairing, windshield, wheel pants and electric starter.

The aircraft carriage is made from welded 4130 steel tubing, while the wing is constructed from bolted-together aluminum tubing and covered in Dacron sailcloth. The 167 sq ft (15.5 m^{2}) area wing is supported by a single tube-type kingpost and uses an "A" frame control bar.

== Variants ==
Eclipse
Basic model powered by a Rotax 503 twin cylinder, air-cooled, two-stroke engine of 50 hp (37 kW), with a gross weight of 850 lb (386 kg). Price was US$14,500 in 2000.
Endeavor
Up-market model powered by a Rotax 582 twin cylinder, liquid-cooled, two-stroke engine of 64 hp (48 kW), with a gross weight of 1,000 lb (454 kg). Price was US$16,300 in 2000.

== Specifications (Endeavor) ==
Data from Cliche

General characteristics

- Crew: one
- Capacity: one passenger
- Wing area: 167 sq ft (15.5 m^{2})
- Empty weight: 260 lb (118 kg)
- Gross weight: 1,000 lb (454 kg)
- Fuel capacity: 10 U.S. gallons (38 L; 8.3 imp gal)
- Powerplant: 1 × Rotax 582 twin cylinder, liquid-cooled, two-stroke aircraft engine, 64 hp (48 kW)

Performance

- Cruise speed: 75 mph (121 km/h, 65 kn)
- Stall speed: 27 mph (43 km/h, 23 kn)
- Rate of climb: 700 ft/min (3.6 m/s)
