= Buckeye Industries =

American powered parachute manufacturer

- Company type: Private company
- Industry: Aerospace
- Defunct: 2008
- Fate: Out of business
- Headquarters: Argos, Indiana, United States
- Products: Powered parachutes Ultralight trikes

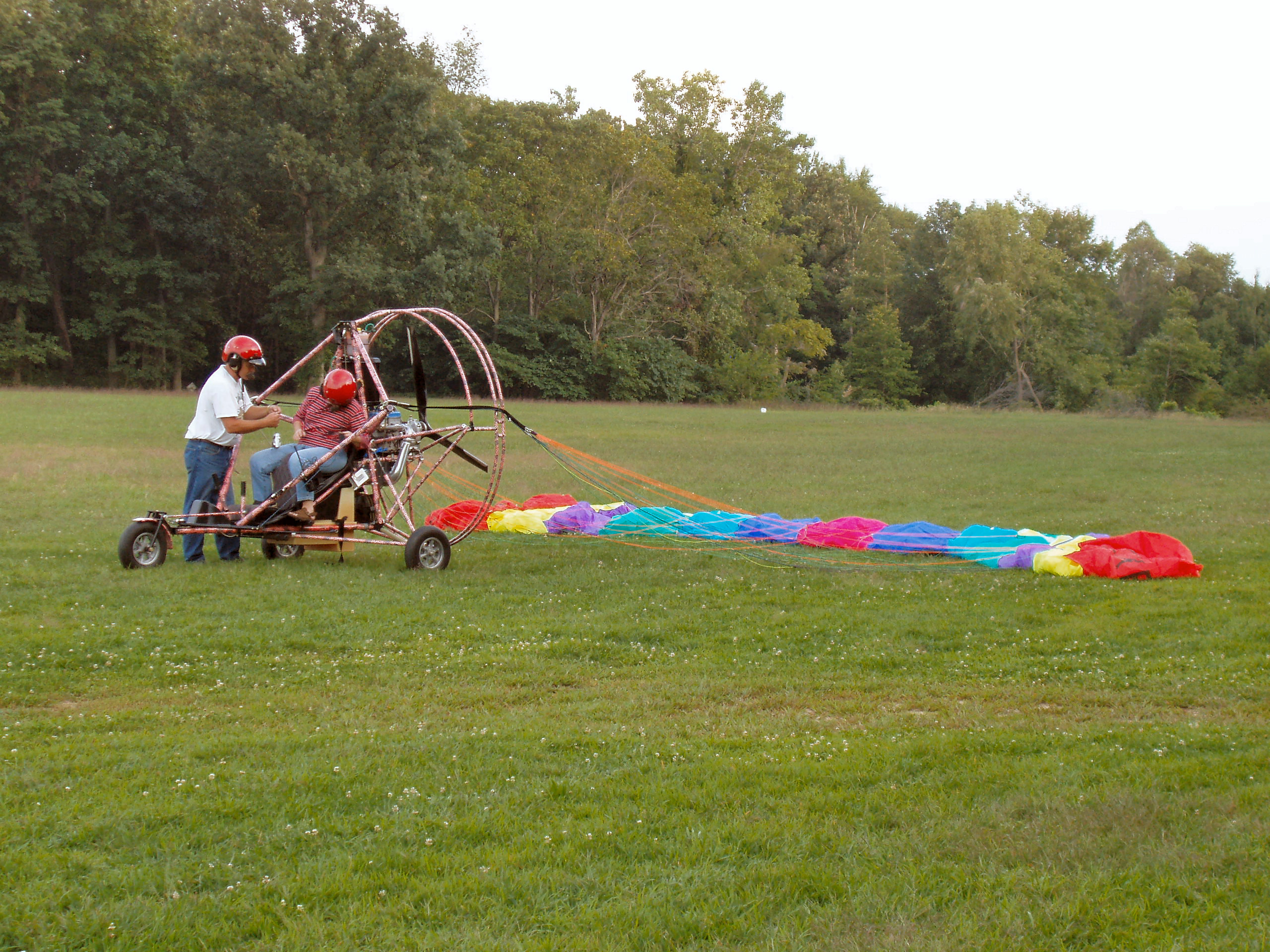
Buckeye two-place model powered parachute readied for launching

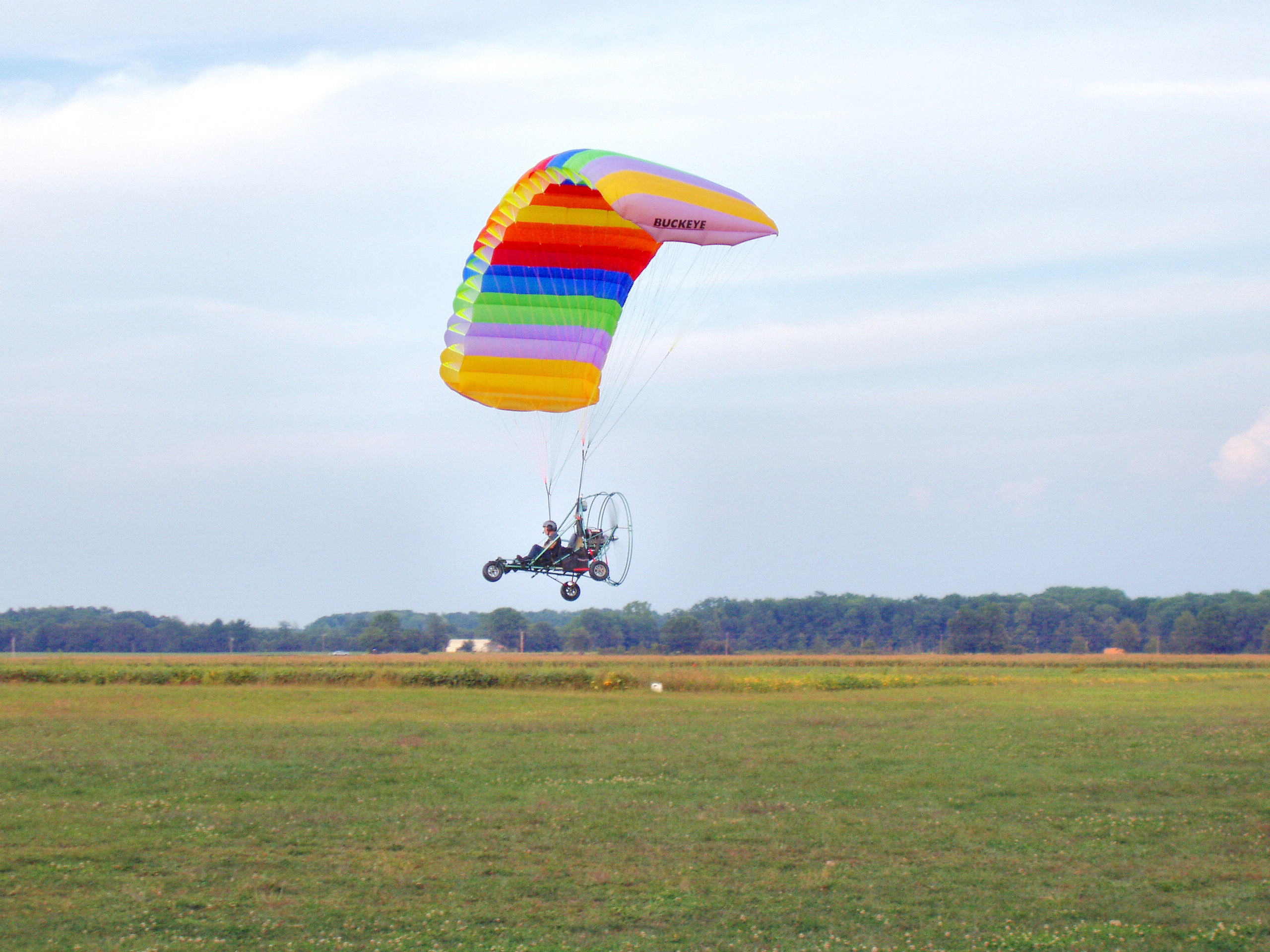
Buckeye two-place model powered parachute in flight

Buckeye Industries, also called Buckeye Aviation, was an American aircraft manufacturer, based in Argos, Indiana. The company was one of the leading manufacturers of powered parachutes and also produced some models of ultralight trikes.

One model, the single-seat Buckeye Eagle, could be flown as either a powered parachute or equipped with a hang glider-style wing and flown as an ultralight trike.

== Aircraft ==
Summary of aircraft built by Buckeye Industries
Model name	First flight	Number built	Type
Buckeye Breeze			Powered parachute
Buckeye Dragonfly			Powered parachute
Buckeye Dream Machine			Powered parachute
Buckeye Eagle			Powered parachute
Buckeye Falcon			Powered parachute
Buckeye Eclipse			Ultralight trike
Buckeye Endeavor			Ultralight trike
