= Houde Speedmax =

French ultralight aircraft

Speedmax

General information
- Type: Ultralight aircraft
- National origin: France
- Manufacturer: Patrice Houde
- Designer: Patrice Houde
- Status: In production (2011)

The Houde Speedmax is a French racing ultralight aircraft, designed and produced by Patrice Houde of Reichshoffen. The aircraft is supplied as plans, as a kit for amateur construction or as a complete ready-to-fly-aircraft, certified under JAR-VLA.

== Design and development ==
The Speedmax features a cantilever low-wing, a single seat enclosed cockpit under a bubble canopy, fixed conventional landing gear and a single engine in tractor configuration.

The aircraft is made from wood, with some parts fabricated from carbon fibre. The standard engine available is the 64 hp (48 kW) Rotax 582 two-stroke powerplant. Two 25 litres (5.5 imp gal; 6.6 US gal) fuel tanks are fitted. The aircraft was designed for aerobatics and stressed to +6 and -5g.

== Specifications (Speedmax) ==
Data from Bayerl and Tacke

General characteristics

- Crew: one
- Empty weight: 190 kg (419 lb)
- Gross weight: 315 kg (694 lb)
- Fuel capacity: 50 litres (11 imp gal; 13 US gal) in two 25 litres (5.5 imp gal; 6.6 US gal) tanks
- Powerplant: 1 × Rotax 582 twin cylinder, liquid-cooled, two stroke aircraft engine, 48 kW (64 hp)
- Propellers: 2-bladed composite

Performance

- Maximum speed: 270 km/h (170 mph, 150 kn)
- Cruise speed: 220 km/h (140 mph, 120 kn)
- Stall speed: 65 km/h (40 mph, 35 kn)
