= General Aviation Design Bureau of Ukraine =

- Industry: Aerospace
- Headquarters: Kyiv, Ukraine
- Products: Ultralight trikes, subcontract aerospace manufacturing
- Website: sla.kiev.ua

The General Aviation Design Bureau of Ukraine is a Ukrainian aircraft manufacturer based in Kyiv. The company specializes in aerospace subcontract work, often for European and North American manufacturers.

The organization has also designed and manufactured ultralight trikes, starting initially as a sub-contractor for designs like the T-2 Maverick for the western training market, and then later producing the design under its own name. The T-2 has an unusual side-by-side configuration that makes it especially well suited for use as a trainer.

The General Aviation Design Bureau T-32 Maverick is an original design and noted as an unusual three-seat ultralight trike design, with a double rear seat for two passengers.

In 2003, an agricultural version of the T-2M motorized hang glider, the T-2MSH motorized hang glider, was certified.

After the creation of the state concern Ukroboronprom in December 2010, the AZP Design Bureau was included in its structure.

In January 2015, representatives of the Ministry of Defense of Ukraine were shown several developments of the Ukrainian defense industry for the Armed Forces of Ukraine. One of the developments presented was the T-2M reconnaissance motorized hang glider produced by the AZP Design Bureau.

== Aircraft ==
Summary of aircraft built by General Aviation Design Bureau of Ukraine
Model name	First flight	Number built	Type
General Aviation Design Bureau T-2 Maverick	1995		Two-seats in side-by-side configuration training ultralight trike
General Aviation Design Bureau T-32 Maverick			Three-seat ultralight trike
