= West Palatine Musicians Museum =

Coordinates: 49.4716°N 07.5843°E

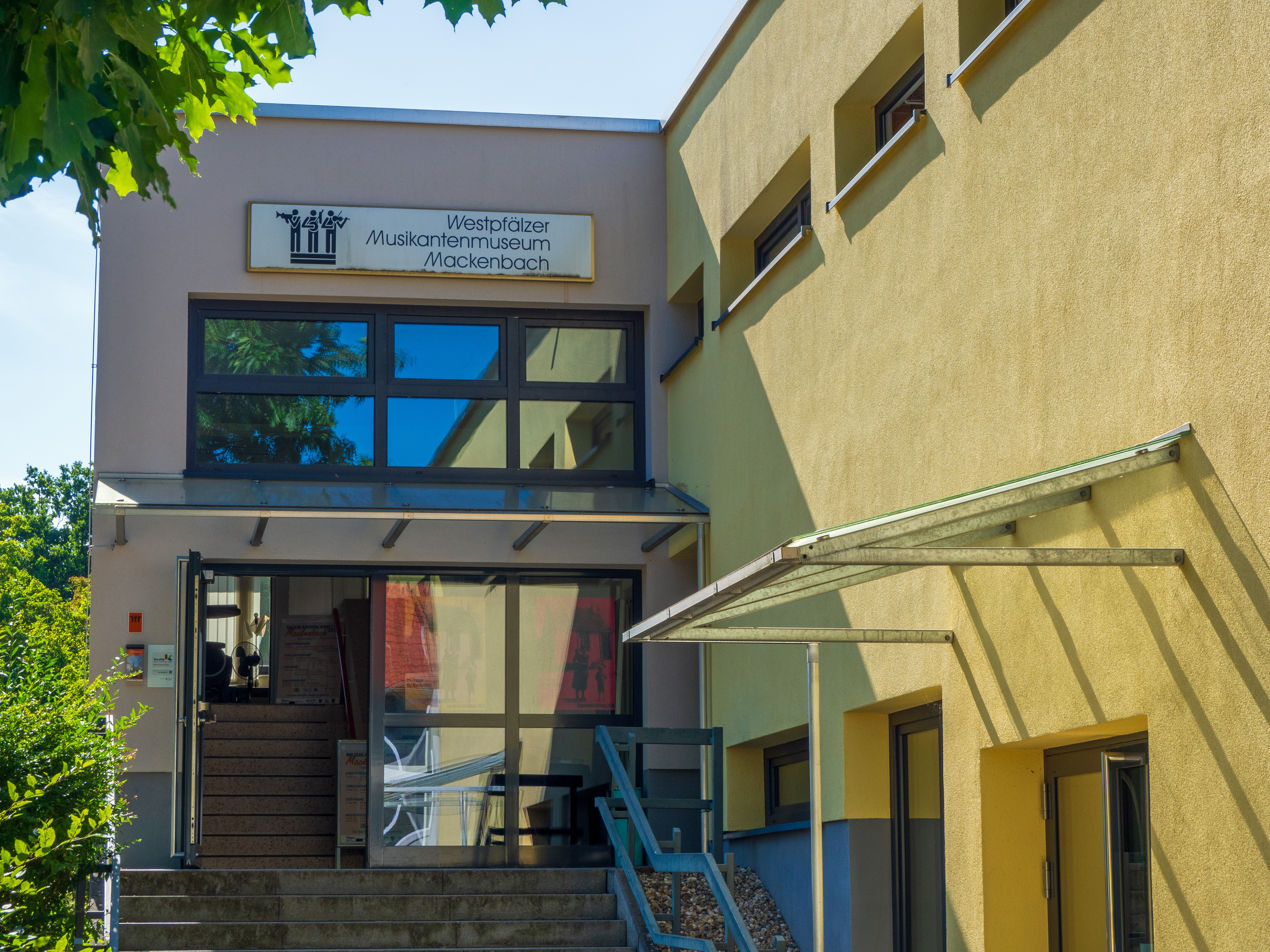
Entrance to the museum

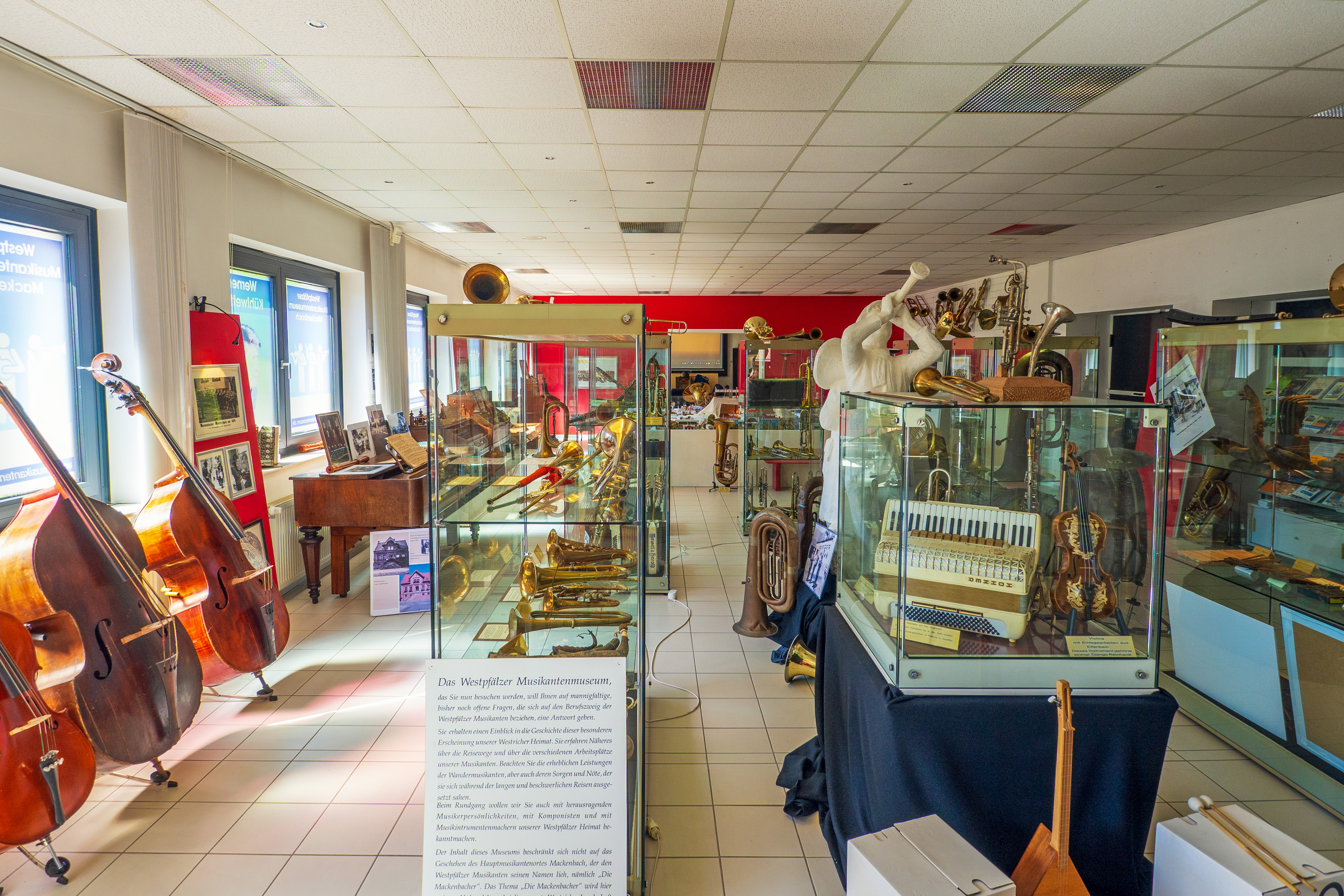
Exhibits in the museum

The West Palatine Musicians Museum (German: Westpfälzer Musikantenmuseum) in Mackenbach, Germany, documents the history of the Westphalian Wandering Musicians, the heyday of which was between 1850 and the First World War.

In addition to musical instruments of the travelling musicians, there is an extensive collection of African musical instruments, historical photos of the villages and houses of musicians and souvenirs of travellers are on display. The linkages between the Musikantenland ("Musicians' Land") and the culture of German emigrants, especially in the US, are also explained.

The West Palatine Musicians Museum was opened in 1991 in the Bürgerhaus ("community hall") of Mackenbach in the Musikantenland. The responsible body is the municipality of Mackenbach. The museum was inspired by an exhibition on the theme of "Mackenbach Wandering Musicians" (Mackenbacher Wandermusikanten) as part of the 100th anniversary of the Mackenbach Music Society in 1983.
