= Eurofly Viper =

Italian ultralight trike

Viper

General information
- Type: Ultralight trike
- National origin: Italy
- Manufacturer: Eurofly Srl
- Status: In production (2013)

The Eurofly Viper is an Italian ultralight trike, designed and produced by Eurofly Srl of Galliera Veneta. The aircraft is supplied as a complete ready-to-fly-aircraft.

== Design and development ==
The aircraft was designed to comply with the Fédération Aéronautique Internationale microlight category, including the category's maximum gross weight of 450 kg (992 lb). The Viper has a maximum gross weight of 450 kg (992 lb). It features a cable-braced hang glider-style high-wing, weight-shift controls, a two-seats-in-tandem open cockpit, tricycle landing gear with wheel pants and a single engine in pusher configuration.

The aircraft is made from welded tubing, with its double surface wing covered in Dacron sailcloth. Its 10.5 m (34.4 ft) span Skyrider Hazard 12 wing is supported by a single tube-type kingpost and uses an "A" frame weight-shift control bar. The standard powerplant is a twin cylinder, liquid-cooled, two-stroke, dual-ignition 64 hp (48 kW) Rotax 582 engine, with the twin cylinder, air-cooled, two-stroke, dual-ignition 50 hp (37 kW) Rotax 503 engine optional. The Viper has an empty weight of 126 kg (278 lb) and a gross weight of 450 kg (992 lb), giving a useful load of 324 kg (714 lb). With full fuel of 65 litres (14 imp gal; 17 US gal) the payload is 277 kg (611 lb).

A number of different wings can be fitted to the basic carriage, including the Skyrider Hazard 12 and Hazard 15. A 70 litres (15 imp gal; 18 US gal) fuel tank is optional.

A basic version of the aircraft, powered by the 50 hp (37 kW) Rotax 503 engine and without fairings is also offered.

== Specifications (Viper with Hazard 12 wing) ==
Data from Bayerl

General characteristics

- Crew: one
- Capacity: one passenger
- Wingspan: 10.5 m (34 ft 5 in)
- Wing area: 12 m^{2} (130 sq ft)
- Empty weight: 126 kg (278 lb)
- Gross weight: 450 kg (992 lb)
- Fuel capacity: 65 litres (14 imp gal; 17 US gal)
- Powerplant: 1 × Rotax 582 twin cylinder, liquid-cooled, two stroke aircraft engine, 48 kW (64 hp)
- Propellers: 2-bladed wooden

Performance

- Maximum speed: 160 km/h (99 mph, 86 kn)
- Cruise speed: 125 km/h (78 mph, 67 kn)
- Stall speed: 48 km/h (30 mph, 26 kn)
- Rate of climb: 8 m/s (1,600 ft/min)
- Wing loading: 37.5 kg/m^{2} (7.7 lb/sq ft)
