= BDC Aero Puma =

Canadian homebuilt light aircraft

Puma
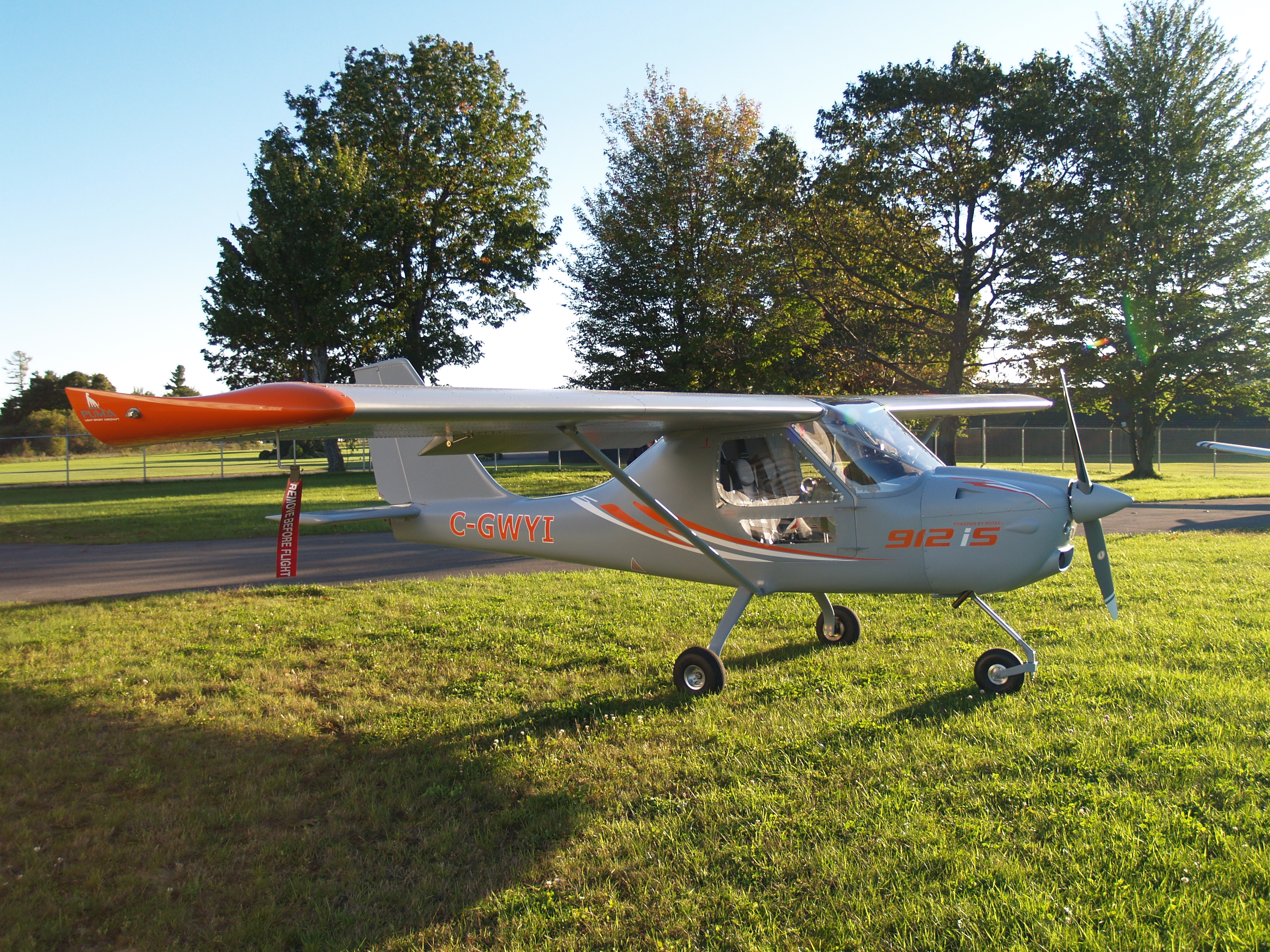
- BDC Aero Puma LSA/Limited

General information
- Type: Ultralight aircraft and Light-sport aircraft
- National origin: Canada
- Manufacturer: Aeroplast (Pluto and Drakken, 1980s-2005); Antonio Bortolanza (Puma, 2007); BDC Aero Industrie (Puma, 2010-present)
- Designer: Antonio Bortolanza
- Status: In production (2017)
- Number built: At least seven by all manufacturers

The BDC Aero Puma is a Canadian ultralight and light-sport aircraft, originally designed by the Italian aircraft designer Antonio Bortolanza and built by Aeroplast of Sale, Piedmont, Italy. It is currently produced by BDC Aero Industrie of Lachute, Quebec. At one time available as a kit for amateur construction, now the aircraft is supplied only as a complete ready-to-fly-aircraft.

== Design and development ==
The aircraft was originally called the Pluto by Bortolanza when he first designed it in the mid-1980s. Later it was known as the Drakken (Swedish for "dragon") before being renamed Puma.

The aircraft was structurally redesigned by BDC Aero Industrie for higher gross weights, to comply with the Canadian Advanced Ultralight rules and US light-sport aircraft rules, in 2006. It features a strut-braced high-wing, a two-seats-in-side-by-side configuration enclosed cockpit with composite doors for access, fixed tricycle landing gear with wheel pants and a single engine in tractor configuration.

The aircraft is made with an aluminum wing and composite fuselage. Its 27.9 ft (8.50 m) span wing has an area of 124 sq ft (11.5 m^{2}) and flaps. Standard engines available are the 80 hp (60 kW) Rotax 912UL and the 100 hp (75 kW) Rotax 912ULS and Rotax 912iS four-stroke powerplants, plus the 115 hp (86 kW) Rotax 914 turbocharged engine. Originally there was a factory-supplied kit that was 90% complete and required the builder to paint the airframe and procure and install the engine and instruments. By 2015 the aircraft was only available factory-built.

The Puma is an approved Transport Canada Advanced Ultralight and limited category aircraft, but, as of September 2015, does not appear on the Federal Aviation Administration light-sport aircraft list.

== Operational history ==
In November 2017 there were three advanced ultralight and two limited category BDC-built Pumas registered with Transport Canada, all built by BDC between 2010 and 2016. There was one BDC-built Puma registered in the United States with the Federal Aviation Administration in 2013. In addition Canada had one Bortolanza Puma, built in Italy in 2007, on its register.

== Variants ==
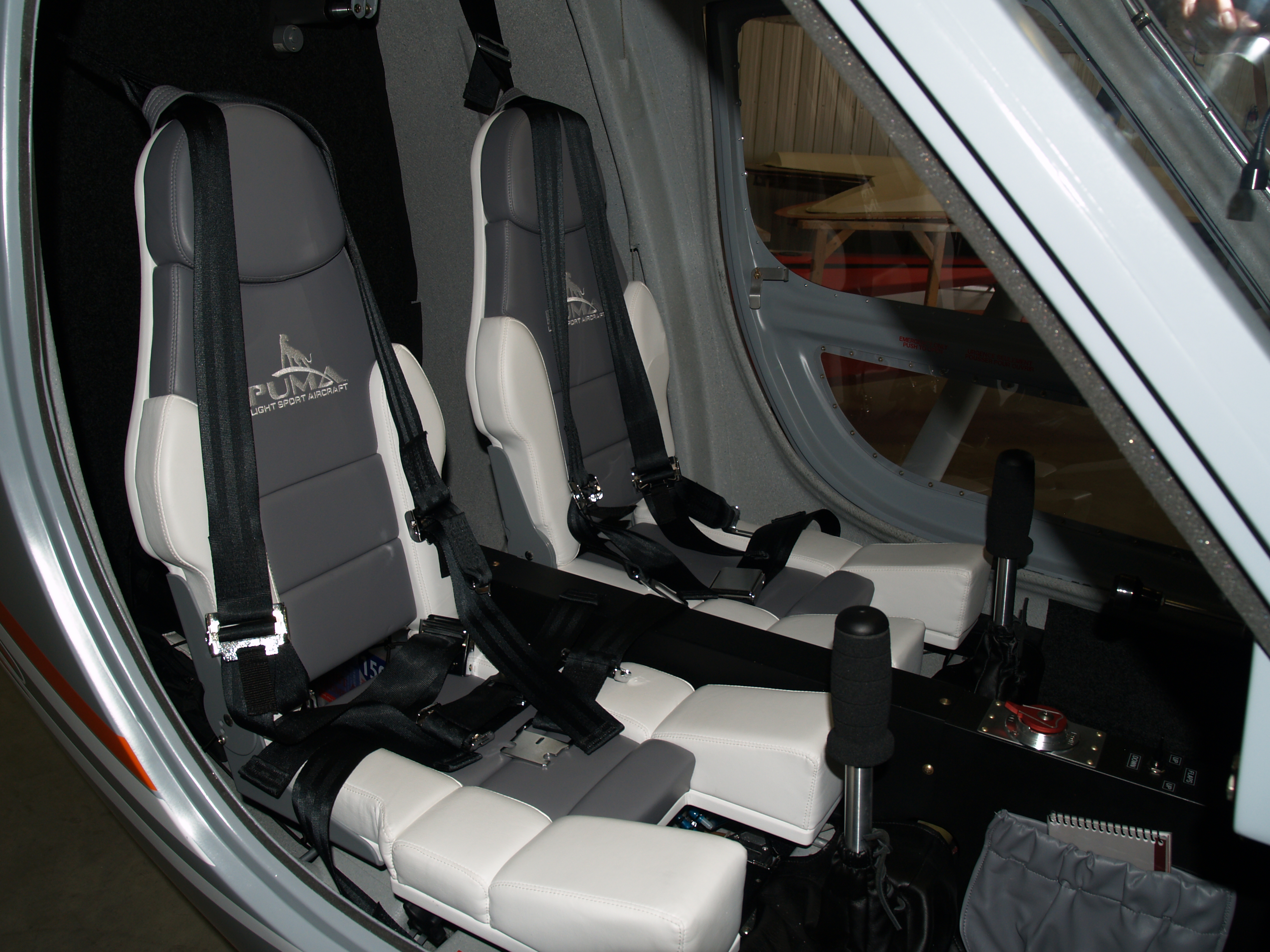
BDC Puma interior

Aeroplast Pluto A-65
Original model, designed by Antonio Bortolanza and produced by Aeroplast in Italy, with a 450 kg (992 lb) gross weight for the European microlight category. Powered by a 64 hp (48 kW) Rotax 582 or an 80 hp (60 kW) Rotax 912UL.
Aeroplast Drakken
Model designed by Antonio Bortolanza in Italy.
Bortolanza Puma
Model designed and built by Antonio Bortolanza in Italy, with a 560 kg (1,235 lb) gross weight for the Canadian advanced ultralight category. At least one built in 2007.
BDC Aero Puma Advanced Ultralight
Redesigned model produced by BDC Aero Industrie in Lachute, Quebec, Canada, with a 560 kg (1,235 lb) gross weight for the Canadian advanced ultralight category. Three built, one in 2010 and two in 2011.
BDC Aero Puma LSA/Limited
Redesigned model produced by BDC Aero Industrie in Lachute, Quebec, Canada, with a 600 kg (1,323 lb) gross weight for the Canadian limited category and the US LSA category. Two built in 2013 and one in 2016.

== Specifications (BDC Puma Advanced Ultralight) ==
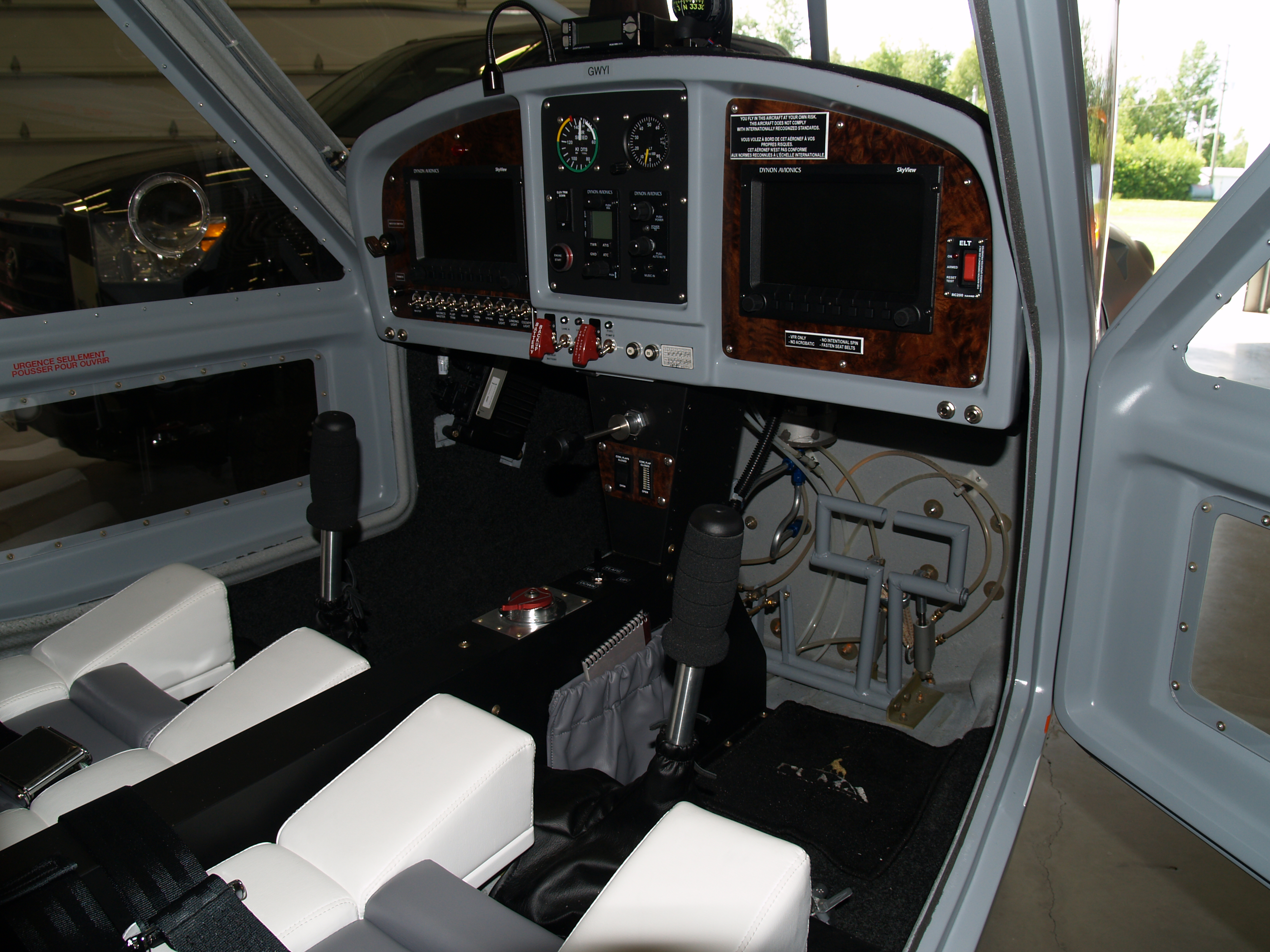
BDC Puma instrument panel

Data from Bayerl and manufacturer.

General characteristics

- Crew: one
- Capacity: one passenger
- Length: 20.8 ft (6.3 m)
- Wingspan: 27.9 ft (8.5 m)
- Wing area: 124 sq ft (11.5 m^{2})
- Empty weight: 683 lb (310 kg)
- Gross weight: 1,232 lb (559 kg)
- Fuel capacity: 23.8 U.S. gallons (90 L; 19.8 imp gal)
- Powerplant: 1 × Rotax 912UL four cylinder, liquid and air-cooled, four stroke aircraft engine, 80 hp (60 kW)
- Propellers: 2-bladed, 5 ft 5 in (1.65 m) diameter (maximum)

Performance

- Cruise speed: 132 mph (213 km/h, 115 kn)
- Stall speed: 40 mph (65 km/h, 35 kn) flaps down
- g limits: +4g/-2g
- Maximum glide ratio: 11.1
- Rate of climb: 1,000 ft/min (5.1 m/s)
- Wing loading: 9.9 lb/sq ft (48 kg/m^{2})
