= Jora Jora =

Jora
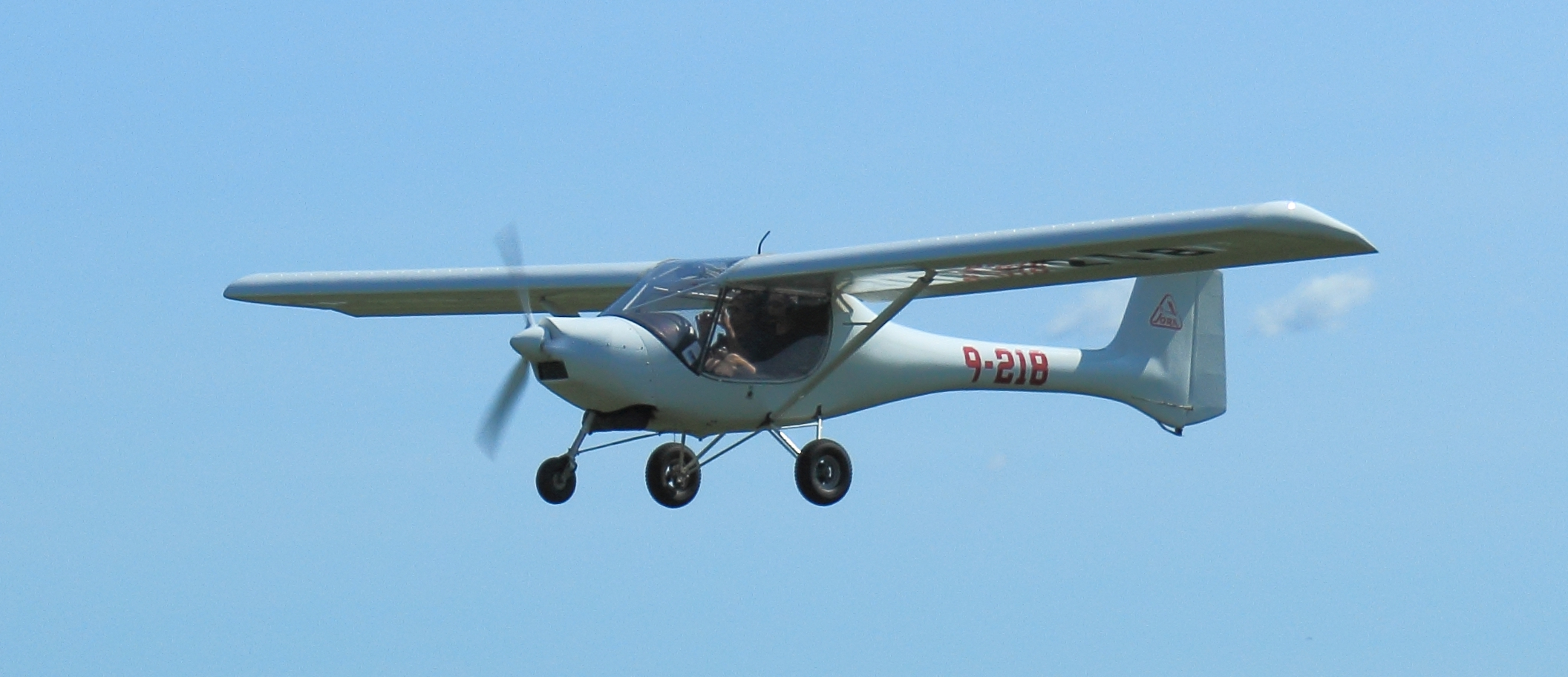
- Jora Jora SRO landing on Drejø, Denmark

General information
- Type: Two seat ultralight
- National origin: Czech Republic
- Manufacturer: Jora Spol s.r.o.
- Designer: Oldrich Olsansky
- Number built: At least 161 by 2009

The Jora Jora is a high wing, T-tail, single-engine, two-seat ultralight designed in the Czech Republic in 1993. More than 160 had been sold by 2009.

== Design and development ==
The Jora was designed by Oldrich Olsansky who also designed the similar Fantasy Air Allegro. It is built mostly from wood and laminates, covered by polyester fabric. The main exception is the central fuselage section, which has a riveted tube frame.

The Jora has separate wings with constant chord and square tips. These are each built up around a single spruce spar. Plywood covering and polyester-filled laminate ribs form a box spar forward to the leading edge, with spruce ribs and polyester covering aft. Since 2006 all composite parts have been replaced by carbon fibre castings. Each wing has a single, faired lift strut to the lower fuselage. Full-span combined ailerons and flaps (flaperons), constructed like the wing, are attached to an auxiliary spar. Separate ailerons and flaps are an option, in which case the wing profile (airfoil) is changed from the laminar flow UA-2 to SL-1. The wings can be detached for transport, though wing folding is an option.

Apart from its tube centre section the fuselage is wholly laminate with strengthening bulkheads and ribs. The fuselage becomes slender towards the fin and has a constant chord tailplane and elevators. The fin has sweep on its leading edge and extends into a small keel below the fuselage. The cockpit seats two in side-by-side configuration, with dual controls including a split, central control column. It is enclosed with a single-piece windscreen and deep side transparencies. The Jora normally has a fixed, tricycle undercarriage, though a conventional undercarriage is an option. The mainwheels are mounted on inverted tubular steel A-frames, hinged to the lower fuselage; the nosewheel is on a forward-leaning leg and is steerable. Some Joras have single cantilever main legs. Rubber springs are used on all legs; the main wheels have hydraulic disc brakes.

The standard engine for the Jora is a 38.2 kW (52 hp) Rotax 582, a two-cylinder two-stroke engine, housed under a short cowling. It can accept engines of up to 75 kW (100 hp).

== Operational history ==
By 2009 at least 161 Joras had been sold to customers in Australia, the Czech Republic, Denmark, Finland, France, Indonesia, Ireland, the Netherlands, Norway and South Africa.

== Specifications (Rotax 582) ==
Data from Jane's All the World's Aircraft 2011/12

General characteristics

- Capacity: two
- Length: 6.00 m (19 ft 8 in)
- Wingspan: 10.60 m (34 ft 9 in)
- Height: 1.95 m (6 ft 5 in)
- Wing area: 12.50 m^{2} (134.5 sq ft) gross
- Airfoil: UA-2 laminar flow
- Empty weight: 225 kg (496 lb)
- Max takeoff weight: 450 kg (992 lb)
- Fuel capacity: 48 L (12.7 US gal; 10.6 Imp gal)
- Powerplant: 1 × Rotax 582 two cylinder two stroke, 2.58:1 reduction gear, 38.8 kW (52.0 hp)
- Propellers: 3-bladed Junkers, 1.60 m (5 ft 3 in) diameter carbon composite

Performance

- Maximum speed: 140 km/h (87 mph, 76 kn)
- Cruise speed: 120 km/h (75 mph, 65 kn)
- Stall speed: 45 km/h (28 mph, 24 kn)
- Never exceed speed: 162 km/h (101 mph, 87 kn)
- Range: 563 km (350 mi, 304 nmi)
- Service ceiling: 3,660 m (12,010 ft)
- g limits: +4/-2
- Rate of climb: 2.53 m/s (498 ft/min)
- Wing loading: 36.0 kg/m^{2} (7.4 lb/sq ft) maximum
- Power/mass: 86 W/kg
