= Kompol Jazz =

:Polish ultralight trike

Jazz

General information
- Type: Ultralight trike
- National origin: Poland
- Manufacturer: Kompol
- Status: In production (2013)

The Kompol Jazz is a Polish ultralight trike, designed and produced by Kompol of Świercze, Pułtusk County. The aircraft is supplied as a complete ready-to-fly-aircraft.

== Design and development ==
The Jazz was designed to comply with the Fédération Aéronautique Internationale microlight category, including the category's maximum gross weight of 450 kg (992 lb). It features a cable-braced hang glider-style high-wing, weight-shift controls, a two-seats-in-tandem open cockpit with a cockpit fairing, tricycle landing gear with wheel pants and a single engine in pusher configuration.

The aircraft is made from bolted-together aluminum tubing, with its double surface wing covered in Dacron sailcloth. Its 9.83 m (32.3 ft) span wing is supported by a single tube-type kingpost and uses an "A" frame weight-shift control bar. The standard supplied powerplant is a twin cylinder, liquid-cooled, two-stroke, dual-ignition 64 hp (48 kW) Rotax 582 engine. The aircraft has an empty weight of 186 kg (410 lb) and a gross weight of 450 kg (992 lb), giving a useful load of 264 kg (582 lb). With full fuel of 40 litres (8.8 imp gal; 11 US gal) the payload is 235 kg (518 lb).

A number of different wings can be fitted to the basic carriage, including the Kompol Stratus 15 and the higher aspect ratio and smaller area Stratus 13. Other manufacturer's wings can also be used.

== Operational history ==
The Jazz has been widely used in competition flying and has won many microlight events.

== Specifications (Jazz 2000 with Stratus 15) ==
Data from Bayerl

General characteristics

- Crew: one
- Capacity: one passenger
- Wingspan: 9.83 m (32 ft 3 in)
- Wing area: 14.6 m^{2} (157 sq ft)
- Empty weight: 186 kg (410 lb)
- Gross weight: 450 kg (992 lb)
- Fuel capacity: 40 litres (8.8 imp gal; 11 US gal)
- Powerplant: 1 × Rotax 582 twin cylinder, liquid-cooled, two stroke aircraft engine, 48 kW (64 hp)
- Propellers: 3-bladed composite

Performance

- Maximum speed: 145 km/h (90 mph, 78 kn)
- Cruise speed: 85 km/h (53 mph, 46 kn)
- Stall speed: 65 km/h (40 mph, 35 kn)
- Wing loading: 30.8 kg/m^{2} (6.3 lb/sq ft)
