= Personal Flight Sky-Tender =

American ultralight trike flying boat

Sky-Tender

General information
- Type: Ultralight trike flying boat
- National origin: United States
- Manufacturer: Personal Flight
- Status: Production completed

The Personal Flight Sky-Tender is an American ultralight trike flying boat that was designed and produced by Personal Flight of Chelan, Washington. Production is complete and the aircraft is no longer available.

== Design and development ==
The aircraft has a standard empty weight of 380 lb (172 kg). It features a cable-braced hang glider-style high-wing, weight-shift controls, a two-seats-in-tandem, open cockpit, a hull made from an inflatable boat and a single engine in pusher configuration.

The aircraft is made from bolted-together aluminum tubing, with its large area 206 sq ft (19.1 m^{2}) single surface wing covered in Dacron sailcloth. Its 32 ft (9.8 m) span wing is supported by a single tube-type kingpost and uses an "A" frame control bar. An off-the-shelf commercial inflatable boat hull is used. A water rudder is fitted at the rear of the boat hull. The standard engine supplied was the twin cylinder, two-stroke, liquid-cooled Rotax 582 of 64 hp (48 kW), including an electric starter.

The large wing area was employed to keep the stall speed low to avoid porpoising problems while conducting water operations. The weight shift nature of the wing means that hull pitch angle cannot be controlled and loss of control is a risk when higher take-off and landing speeds are required.

The Sky-Tender was assembled in the United States by Personal Flight from aircraft and marine components from Italy, France and Austria. The price in 2000 was US$20,000.

== Specifications (Sky-Tender) ==
Data from Cliche

General characteristics

- Crew: one
- Capacity: one passenger
- Wingspan: 32 ft 0 in (9.75 m)
- Wing area: 206 sq ft (19.1 m^{2})
- Empty weight: 380 lb (172 kg)
- Gross weight: 580 lb (263 kg)
- Fuel capacity: 10 U.S. gallons (38 L; 8.3 imp gal)
- Powerplant: 1 × Rotax 582 twin cylinder, two-stroke, liquid-cooled aircraft engine, 64 hp (48 kW)

Performance

- Cruise speed: 55 mph (89 km/h, 48 kn)
- Rate of climb: 500 ft/min (2.5 m/s)
