= Aviasouz Cruise =

Russian ultralight trike

Cruise

General information
- Type: Ultralight trike
- National origin: Russia
- Manufacturer: Aviasouz
- Status: In production (2013)

The Aviasouz Cruise is a Russian ultralight trike, designed and produced by Aviasouz of Kazan. The aircraft is supplied as a complete ready-to-fly-aircraft.

The company was formed by former employees of the Tupolev Design Bureau.

== Design and development ==
The aircraft was designed to comply with the Fédération Aéronautique Internationale microlight category, including the category's maximum gross weight of 450 kg (992 lb). The aircraft has a maximum gross weight of 430 kg (948 lb). It features a cable-braced hang glider-style high-wing, weight-shift controls, a two-seats-in-side-by-side configuration open cockpit with a unique fibreglass cockpit fairing, tricycle landing gear with wheel pants and a single engine in pusher configuration.

The aircraft is made from bolted-together aluminum tubing, with its single surface wing covered in Dacron sailcloth. Its 10 m (32.8 ft) span wing is supported by a single tube-type kingpost and uses an "A" frame weight-shift control bar. The powerplant is a twin cylinder, air-cooled, two-stroke, dual-ignition 64 hp (48 kW) Rotax 582 engine, with the four cylinder, air and liquid-cooled, four-stroke, dual-ignition 80 hp (60 kW) Rotax 912 engine optional. The aircraft has an empty weight of 180 kg (397 lb) and a gross weight of 430 kg (948 lb), giving a useful load of 250 kg (551 lb). With full fuel of 50 litres (11 imp gal; 13 US gal) the payload is 214 kg (472 lb).

== Specifications (Cruise) ==
Data from Bayerl and Bertrand

General characteristics

- Crew: one
- Capacity: one passenger
- Wingspan: 10 m (32 ft 10 in)
- Wing area: 14 m^{2} (150 sq ft)
- Empty weight: 180 kg (397 lb)
- Gross weight: 430 kg (948 lb)
- Fuel capacity: 50 litres (11 imp gal; 13 US gal)
- Powerplant: 1 × Rotax 582 twin cylinder, liquid-cooled, two stroke aircraft engine, 48 kW (64 hp)
- Propellers: 3-bladed composite

Performance

- Maximum speed: 125 km/h (78 mph, 67 kn)
- Cruise speed: 90 km/h (56 mph, 49 kn)
- Stall speed: 55 km/h (34 mph, 30 kn)
- Rate of climb: 4 m/s (790 ft/min)
- Wing loading: 30.7 kg/m^{2} (6.3 lb/sq ft)
