= Eurofly Flash Light =

Italian ultralight aircraft

General information
- Type: Ultralight aircraft
- National origin: Italy
- Manufacturer: Eurofly Srl
- Status: In production

The Eurofly Flash Light (sometimes styled by the manufacturer as FLASHlight) is an Italian ultralight aircraft, designed and produced by Eurofly Srl, of Galliera Veneta. The aircraft is supplied as a kit for amateur construction or as a complete ready-to-fly-aircraft.

== Design and development ==
The aircraft was designed to comply with the Fédération Aéronautique Internationale microlight rules. It features a strut-braced high-wing, a two-seats-in-side-by-side configuration enclosed cockpit, fixed tricycle landing gear and a single engine in tractor configuration.

The aircraft fuselage is made from welded steel tubing, with the wing made from aluminum tubing, all covered in heat-shrunk Dacron aircraft fabric. Its 8.5 m (27.9 ft) span wing has an area of 13.5 m^{2} (145 sq ft) and is supported by V-struts with jury struts. The standard engine available is the 64 hp (48 kW) Rotax 582 two-stroke, which gives a cruising speed of 130 km/h (81 mph), with the 80 hp (60 kW) Rotax 912UL four-stroke powerplant optional, which gives a cruising speed of 160 km/h (99 mph).

== Specifications (Flash Light) ==
Data from Bayerl and Eurofly

General characteristics

- Crew: one
- Capacity: one passenger
- Length: 6.5 m (21 ft 4 in)
- Wingspan: 8.5 m (27 ft 11 in)
- Height: 1.85 m (6 ft 1 in)
- Wing area: 13.5 m^{2} (145 sq ft)
- Empty weight: 255 kg (562 lb)
- Gross weight: 450 kg (992 lb)
- Fuel capacity: 50 litres (11 imp gal; 13 US gal)
- Powerplant: 1 × Rotax 582 two cylinder, liquid-cooled, two stroke aircraft engine, 48 kW (64 hp)

Performance

- Maximum speed: 180 km/h (110 mph, 97 kn)
- Cruise speed: 130 km/h (81 mph, 70 kn)
- Stall speed: 50 km/h (31 mph, 27 kn)
- Never exceed speed: 200 km/h (120 mph, 110 kn)
- g limits: +6/-4
- Maximum glide ratio: 10:1 at 100 km/h
- Rate of climb: 5 m/s (980 ft/min)
- Rate of sink: 2.5 m/s (490 ft/min)
- Wing loading: 33 kg/m^{2} (6.8 lb/sq ft)
