= Schönleber Vento =

German ultralight trike

Vento

General information
- Type: Ultralight trike
- National origin: Germany
- Manufacturer: Schönleber Metallbau GbR
- Status: In production (2015)

The Schönleber Vento (transl. Wind) is a German ultralight trike designed and produced by Schönleber Metallbau GbR of Schönaich and formerly located in Regensburg. The aircraft is supplied complete and ready-to-fly.

== Design and development ==
The company has been producing ultralight trikes since the 1990s, mostly to supply local customers and without advertising. The company's main business is metal fabrication.

The Vento was designed to comply with the Fédération Aéronautique Internationale microlight category, including the category's maximum gross weight of 450 kg (992 lb). The aircraft has a maximum gross weight of 400 kg (882 lb).

The aircraft design features a cable-braced hang glider-style high-wing, weight-shift controls, a two-seats-in-tandem open cockpit with an optional cockpit fairing, tricycle landing gear and a single engine in pusher configuration.

The aircraft is made from bolted-together aluminum tubing, with its double surface wing covered in Dacron sailcloth. Its 9.5 m (31.2 ft) span wing is supported by a single tube-type kingpost and uses an "A" frame weight-shift control bar. The powerplant is a twin cylinder, liquid-cooled, two-stroke, dual-ignition 64 hp (48 kW) Rotax 582 engine, equipped with a 4:1 belt reduction drive to reduce the aircraft's noise signature.

The aircraft has an empty weight of 160 kg (353 lb) and a gross weight of 400 kg (882 lb), giving a useful load of 240 kg (529 lb). With full fuel of 60 litres (13 imp gal; 16 US gal) the payload is 197 kg (434 lb).

A number of different wings can be fitted to the basic carriage, including a special wing for hang glider towing.

== Specifications (Vento) ==
Data from Tacke

General characteristics

- Crew: one
- Capacity: one passenger
- Wingspan: 9.5 m (31 ft 2 in)
- Wing area: 13 m^{2} (140 sq ft)
- Empty weight: 160 kg (353 lb)
- Gross weight: 400 kg (882 lb)
- Fuel capacity: 60 litres (13 imp gal; 16 US gal)
- Powerplant: 1 × Rotax 582 twin cylinder, liquid-cooled, two stroke aircraft engine, equipped with a 4:1 belt reduction drive, 48 kW (64 hp)
- Propellers: 3-bladed composite

Performance

- Maximum speed: 120 km/h (75 mph, 65 kn)
- Cruise speed: 95 km/h (59 mph, 51 kn)
- Stall speed: 50 km/h (31 mph, 27 kn)
- Rate of climb: 3.2 m/s (630 ft/min)
- Wing loading: 30.8 kg/m^{2} (6.3 lb/sq ft)
