= Sea and Sky Cygnet =

American ultralight trike

Cygnet
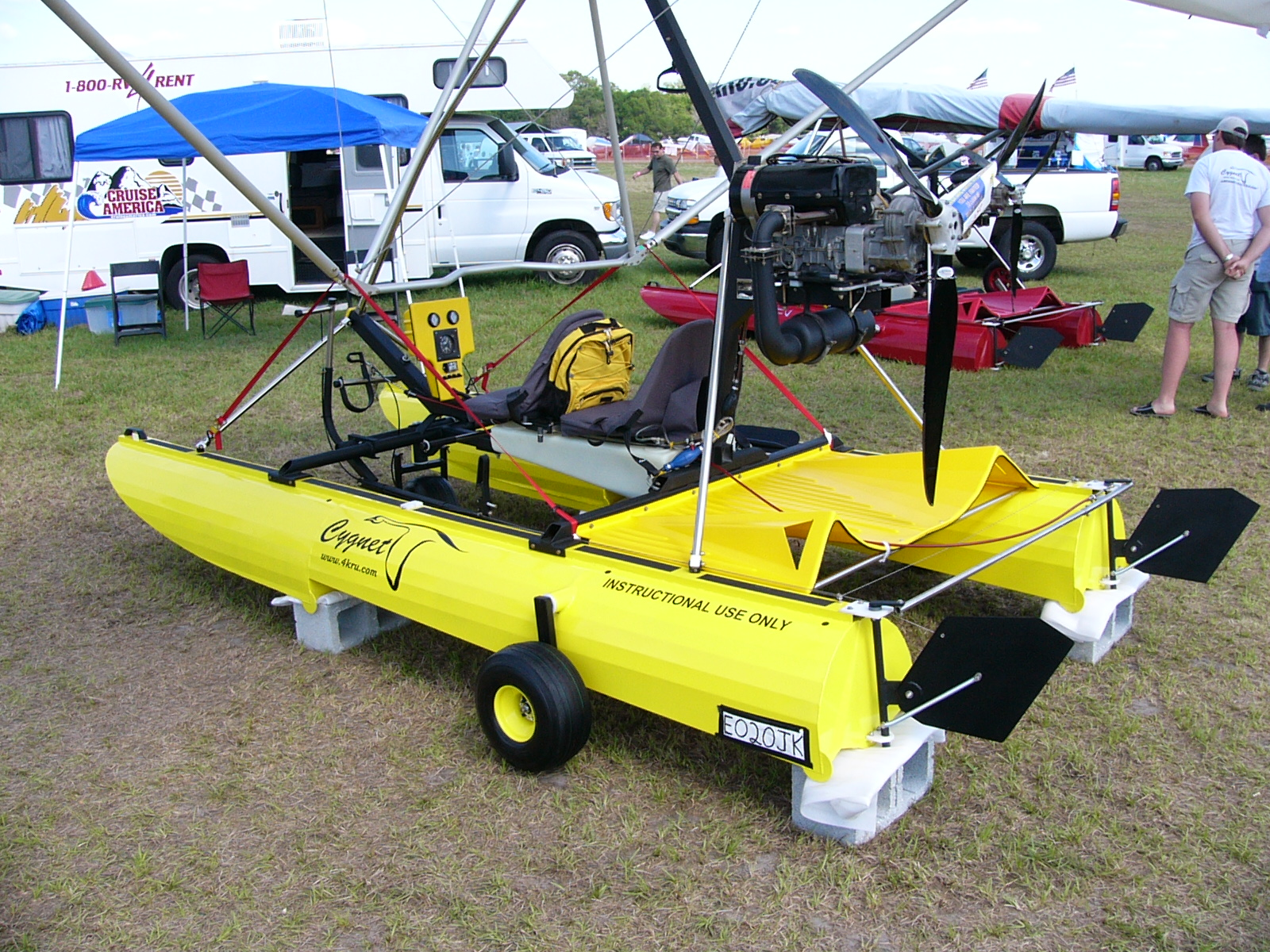
- Krucker Cygnet at Sun 'n Fun, 2004

General information
- Type: Ultralight trike
- National origin: United States
- Manufacturer: Krucker Manufacturing; Sea and Sky
- Designer: J.P. Krucker
- Status: In production (2013)

The Sea and Sky Cygnet (also known as the Krucker Cygnet) is an American amphibious ultralight trike that was designed by J.P. Krucker and initially produced by his company Krucker Manufacturing in Sudbury, Ontario, Canada and later by Sea and Sky of Fort Walton Beach, Florida, United States. The aircraft is supplied as a kit for amateur construction or as a complete ready-to-fly-aircraft.

== Design and development ==
The aircraft was designed to comply with the Fédération Aéronautique Internationale microlight category and the US light-sport aircraft rules. It features a strut-braced hang glider-style high-wing, weight-shift controls, a two-seats-in-tandem open cockpit, retractable wheeled tricycle landing gear and dual floats and a single engine in pusher configuration.

The aircraft is made from bolted-together aluminum tubing, with its single surface wing covered in Dacron sailcloth. Its 10.3 m (33.8 ft) span wing is supported by struts and uses an "A" frame weight-shift control bar. The standard powerplants are the twin cylinder, liquid-cooled, two-stroke, dual-ignition 65 hp (48 kW) Rotax 582 engine, the four cylinder, air and liquid-cooled, four-stroke, dual-ignition 80 hp (60 kW) Rotax 912UL and the 100 hp (75 kW) Rotax 912ULS engines. The aircraft has an empty weight of 529 lb (240 kg) and a gross weight of 992 lb (450 kg), giving a useful load of 463 lb (210 kg). With full fuel of 10 U.S. gallons (38 L; 8.3 imp gal) the payload is 403 lb (183 kg).

A number of different wings can be fitted to the basic carriage, including the North Wings Pulse 17 m^{2} (180 sq ft) and 19 m^{2} (200 sq ft) sizes. The LSA-approved wings are the North Wing Mustang 3 in 15 m^{2} (160 sq ft), 17 m^{2} (180 sq ft) and 19 m^{2} (200 sq ft) and the Keitek Hazard.

== Operational history ==
The Cygnet was awarded Best Trike at Sun 'n Fun in 2005.

== Variants ==
Cygnet
Initial model
Cygnet 2
Improved model

== Specifications (Cygnet 2 with North Wings Pulse 17 wing) ==
Data from Bayerl

General characteristics

- Crew: one
- Capacity: one passenger
- Wingspan: 33 ft 10 in (10.3 m)
- Wing area: 189 sq ft (17.6 m^{2})
- Empty weight: 529 lb (240 kg)
- Gross weight: 992 lb (450 kg)
- Fuel capacity: 10 U.S. gallons (38 L; 8.3 imp gal)
- Powerplant: 1 × Rotax 582 twin cylinder, liquid-cooled, two stroke aircraft engine, 64 hp (48 kW)
- Propellers: 3-bladed composite

Performance

- Maximum speed: 60 mph (96 km/h, 52 kn)
- Cruise speed: 37 mph (60 km/h, 32 kn)
- Stall speed: 31 mph (50 km/h, 27 kn)
- Rate of climb: 490 ft/min (2.5 m/s)
- Wing loading: 5.2 lb/sq ft (25.6 kg/m^{2})
