= Sunward ST =

Chinese ultralight trike

ST

General information
- Type: Ultralight trike
- National origin: China
- Manufacturer: Sunward Tech
- Status: In production (2018)

The Sunward ST is a Chinese ultralight trike designed and produced by Sunward Tech (Hunan Sunward Science & Technologies Company Limited) of Zhuzhou. The aircraft is supplied complete and ready-to-fly.

== Design and development ==
The ST was designed to comply with the Fédération Aéronautique Internationale microlight category, including the category's maximum gross weight of 450 kg (992 lb). The aircraft has a maximum gross weight of 450 kg (992 lb).

The aircraft design features a strut-braced topless hang glider-style high-wing, weight-shift controls, a two-seats-in-tandem open cockpit with a cockpit fairing, tricycle landing gear with wheel pants and a single engine in pusher configuration.

The aircraft is made from bolted-together aluminum tubing and composites. It uses a double surface Grif Hazard wing, made by the Italian company Grif Italia. The 10.38 m (34.1 ft) span wing is supported by struts and uses an "A" frame weight-shift control bar. The powerplant is an Austrian-made twin cylinder, liquid-cooled, two-stroke, dual-ignition 64 hp (48 kW) Rotax 582 engine or four cylinder, air and liquid-cooled, four-stroke, dual-ignition 80 hp (60 kW) Rotax 912UL engine.

The Rotax 582-equipped model has an empty weight of 198 kg (437 lb) and a gross weight of 450 kg (992 lb), giving a useful load of 252 kg (556 lb). With full fuel of 60 litres (13 imp gal; 16 US gal) the payload is 209 kg (461 lb).

== Variants ==
ST582
Model powered by a Rotax 582 two-stroke powerplant. Designed for flight training and aerial work, an agricultural aircraft version was introduced in 2012 with crop-spraying gear. This includes a 120 kg (265 lb)-capacity tank that can cover 13.34 km^{2} (5 sq mi).
ST912
Model powered by a Rotax 912UL four-stroke powerplant.

== Specifications (ST582) ==
Data from Tacke

General characteristics

- Crew: one
- Capacity: one passenger
- Wingspan: 10.38 m (34 ft 1 in)
- Wing area: 16.8 m^{2} (181 sq ft)
- Empty weight: 198 kg (437 lb)
- Gross weight: 450 kg (992 lb)
- Fuel capacity: 60 litres (13 imp gal; 16 US gal)
- Powerplant: 1 × Rotax 582 two-cylinder, liquid-cooled, two stroke aircraft engine, 48 kW (64 hp)
- Propellers: 3-bladed composite

Performance

- Maximum speed: 105 km/h (65 mph, 57 kn)
- Cruise speed: 80 km/h (50 mph, 43 kn)
- Stall speed: 40 km/h (25 mph, 22 kn)
- Wing loading: 27.8 kg/m^{2} (5.7 lb/sq ft)

== See also ==
- Sunward STB
