= FUL MA 30 Graffiti =

German ultralight trike

MA 30 Graffiti

General information
- Type: Ultralight trike
- National origin: Germany
- Manufacturer: Fachschule für Ultraleicht und Motorflug
- Status: In production (2013)

The FUL MA 30 Graffiti is a German ultralight trike, designed and produced by Fachschule für Ultraleicht und Motorflug (English: Professional School for Ultralights and Motorized Aircraft) of Hörselberg-Hainich, Thuringia. The aircraft is supplied as a complete ready-to-fly-aircraft.

The manufacturer is a flying school and aircraft importer that decided to produce their own model ultralight trike.

== Design and development ==
The Graffiti was designed to comply with the Fédération Aéronautique Internationale microlight category, including the category's maximum gross weight of 450 kg (992 lb). The aircraft has a maximum gross weight of 400 kg (882 lb). It features a cable-braced hang glider-style high-wing, weight-shift controls, a two-seats-in-tandem open cockpit with a cockpit fairing, tricycle landing gear with wheel pants and a single engine in pusher configuration.

The aircraft is made from bolted-together aluminum tubing joined by titanium fittings, with its double surface wing covered in Dacron sailcloth. Its 10.1 m (33.1 ft) span wing is supported by a single tube-type kingpost and uses an "A" frame weight-shift control bar. The standard powerplant is a twin cylinder, liquid-cooled, two-stroke, dual-ignition 64 hp (48 kW) Rotax 582 engine, but a wide range of engines are available. With the Rotax 582 powerplant the aircraft has an empty weight of 185 kg (408 lb) and a gross weight of 400 kg (882 lb), giving a useful load of 215 kg (474 lb). With full fuel of 42 litres (9.2 imp gal; 11 US gal) the payload is 185 kg (408 lb).

The aircraft has some unique features: the seat assembly and engine mount are integrated and the fuel tank will automatically depart the aircraft in the event of an impact. A wide range of different wings can be fitted to the basic carriage.

== Specifications (MA 30 Graffiti) ==
Data from Bayerl

General characteristics

- Crew: one
- Capacity: one passenger
- Wingspan: 10.1 m (33 ft 2 in)
- Wing area: 14.8 m^{2} (159 sq ft)
- Empty weight: 185 kg (408 lb)
- Gross weight: 400 kg (882 lb)
- Fuel capacity: 42 litres (9.2 imp gal; 11 US gal)
- Powerplant: 1 × Rotax 582 twin cylinder, liquid-cooled, two stroke aircraft engine, 48 kW (64 hp)
- Propellers: 3-bladed composite

Performance

- Maximum speed: 115 km/h (71 mph, 62 kn)
- Cruise speed: 90 km/h (56 mph, 49 kn)
- Stall speed: 53 km/h (33 mph, 29 kn)
- Rate of climb: 5 m/s (980 ft/min)
- Wing loading: 27.0 kg/m^{2} (5.5 lb/sq ft)
