= Sunward STB =

Chinese amphibious ultralight trike

STB

General information
- Type: Ultralight trike
- National origin: China
- Manufacturer: Sunward Tech
- Status: In production (2018)

The Sunward STB is a Chinese amphibious ultralight trike, designed and produced by Sunward Tech (Hunan Sunward Science & Technologies Company Limited) of Zhuzhou. The aircraft is supplied complete and ready-to-fly.

== Design and development ==
The STB is intended for the search and rescue role, as well as tourist flights and recreational use. It was designed to comply with the Fédération Aéronautique Internationale microlight category, including the category's maximum gross weight of 450 kg (992 lb). The aircraft has a maximum gross weight of 450 kg (992 lb).

The aircraft design features a strut-braced hang glider-style high-wing, weight-shift controls, a two-seats-in-tandem open cockpit with a rigid boat hull, retractable tricycle landing gear and a single engine in pusher configuration. The boat hull was designed for use in higher wave conditions.

The aircraft is made from bolted-together aluminum tubing and composites. It uses a double surface Grif Hazard wing, made by the Italian company Grif Italia. The 10.35 m (34.0 ft) span wing is supported by struts and uses an "A" frame weight-shift control bar. The powerplant is an Austrian-made twin cylinder, liquid-cooled, two-stroke, dual-ignition 64 hp (48 kW) Rotax 582 engine or four cylinder, air and liquid-cooled, four-stroke, dual-ignition 80 hp (60 kW) Rotax 912UL engine.

The aircraft has an empty weight of 248 kg (547 lb) and a gross weight of 450 kg (992 lb), giving a useful load of 202 kg (445 lb). With full fuel of 60 litres (13 imp gal; 16 US gal) the payload is 159 kg (351 lb).

== Variants ==
STB582
Model with a 64 hp (48 kW) Rotax 582 engine.
STB912
Model with an 80 hp (60 kW) Rotax 912UL engine.

== Specifications (STB582) ==
Data from Tacke

General characteristics

- Crew: one
- Capacity: one passenger
- Wingspan: 10.35 m (33 ft 11 in)
- Wing area: 15 m^{2} (160 sq ft)
- Empty weight: 248 kg (547 lb)
- Gross weight: 450 kg (992 lb)
- Fuel capacity: 60 litres (13 imp gal; 16 US gal)
- Powerplant: 1 × Rotax 582 twin cylinder, liquid-cooled, two stroke aircraft engine, 48 kW (64 hp)
- Propellers: 3-bladed composite

Performance

- Maximum speed: 90 km/h (56 mph, 49 kn)
- Cruise speed: 60 km/h (37 mph, 32 kn)
- Stall speed: 38 km/h (24 mph, 21 kn)
- Wing loading: 30 kg/m^{2} (6.1 lb/sq ft)

== See also ==
- Sunward ST
