= Gdecouv'R 582 =

French ultralight trike

582

General information
- Type: Ultralight trike
- National origin: France
- Manufacturer: Gdecouv'R
- Designer: Jean-Michel Geay
- Status: In production (2013)

The Gdecouv'R 582 is a French ultralight trike, designed by Jean-Michel Geay and produced by Gdecouv'R of Fontaine-lès-Dijon. The aircraft is supplied as a complete ready-to-fly aircraft.

== Design and development ==
The designer was a former employee of Cosmos ULM before that company went out of business. His new company, Gdecouv'R, started out as a parts manufacturer supplying Cosmos owners, before he developed his own aircraft, based on Cosmos designs.

The aircraft was designed to comply with the Fédération Aéronautique Internationale microlight category, including the category's maximum gross weight of 450 kg (992 lb). It features a cable-braced hang glider-style high wing, weight-shift controls, a two-seats-in-tandem open cockpit, tricycle landing gear and a single engine in pusher configuration.

The aircraft is made from bolted-together aluminum tubing, with its double surface wing covered in Dacron sailcloth. Its standard equipment 9.87 m (32.4 ft) span La Mouette wing is supported by a single tube-type kingpost and uses an "A" frame weight-shift control bar. The powerplant is a twin-cylinder, liquid-cooled, two-stroke, dual-ignition 64 hp (48 kW) Rotax 582 engine. The aircraft has an empty weight of 132 kg (291 lb) and a gross weight of 450 kg (992 lb), giving a useful load of 318 kg (701 lb). With full fuel of 55 litres (12 imp gal; 15 US gal) the payload is 278 kg (613 lb).

A number of different wings can be fitted to the basic carriage, including those produced by La Mouette.

== Specifications (582) ==
Data from Bayerl

General characteristics

- Crew: one
- Capacity: one passenger
- Wingspan: 9.87 m (32 ft 5 in)
- Wing area: 13 m^{2} (140 sq ft)
- Empty weight: 132 kg (291 lb)
- Gross weight: 450 kg (992 lb)
- Fuel capacity: 55 litres (12 imp gal; 15 US gal)
- Powerplant: 1 × Rotax 582 twin cylinder, liquid-cooled, two stroke aircraft engine, 48 kW (64 hp)
- Propellers: 3-bladed composite

Performance

- Maximum speed: 145 km/h (90 mph, 78 kn)
- Cruise speed: 100 km/h (62 mph, 54 kn)
- Stall speed: 50 km/h (31 mph, 27 kn)
- Rate of climb: 7 m/s (1,400 ft/min)
- Wing loading: 34.6 kg/m^{2} (7.1 lb/sq ft)
