= Rotax 582 =

Austrian two-stroke aircraft engine

582
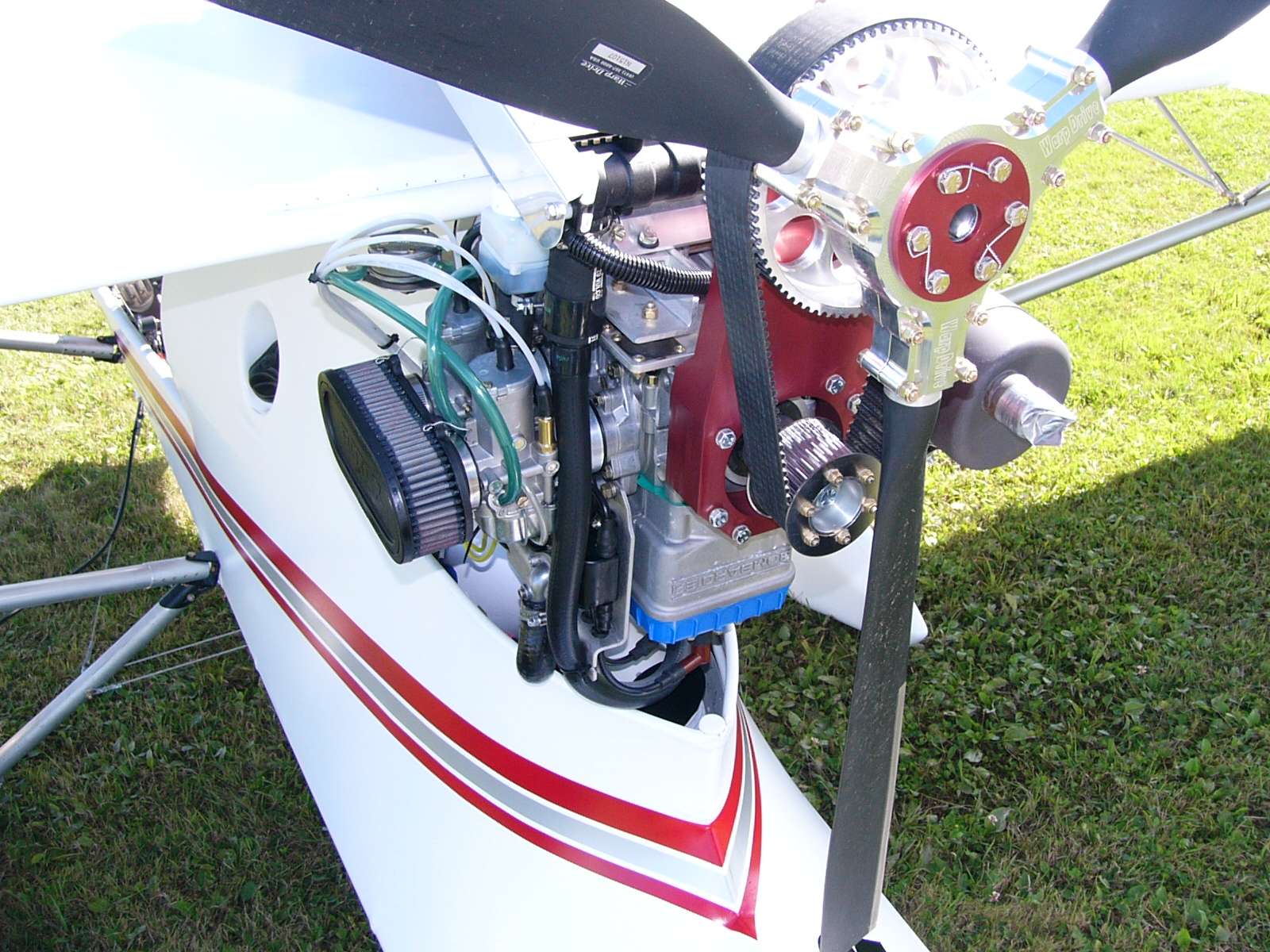
- Rotax 582 pusher installation on a Quad City Challenger II
- Type: Piston aero-engine
- National origin: Austria
- Manufacturer: Rotax
- Major applications: Quad City Challenger; Blue Yonder Merlin
- Status: Production to be completed by end of 2021
- Manufactured: 1989–2021
- Number built: more than 30,000 (July 2021)

The Rotax 582 is a 48 kW (64 hp) two-stroke, two-cylinder, rotary intake valve, oil-in-fuel or oil injection pump, liquid-cooled, gear reduction-drive aircraft engine manufactured by BRP-Rotax GmbH & Co. KG. It is for use in non-certified aircraft operating in day visual flight rules.

Production of the engine ended at the end of 2021.

== Development ==
The Rotax 582 is based upon the earlier Rotax 532 engine design and was designed for ultralight aircraft. The 582 increased the bore from the 532 engine's 72 to 76 mm (2.8 to 3.0 in). This increased the displacement from 521.2 cc (31.81 cu in) to 580.7 cc (35.44 cu in), an increase of 11%. The increased displacement flattened the 532's torque curve and allowed the 582 to produce useful power over a wider rpm range. Reliability over the 532 was also improved.

The 582 features liquid-cooled cylinder heads and cylinders with a rotary intake valve. Cooling is via an externally mounted radiator. Lubrication is either by use of pre-mixed fuel and oil or oil injection from an externally mounted oil tank. The 582 has dual independent breakerless, magneto capacitor discharge ignition (CDI) systems and is equipped with two piston-type carburetors. It uses a manifold-driven pneumatic fuel pump to provide fuel pressure. An optional High Altitude Compensation kit is available.

Early in the engine's production the propeller drive was via a Rotax type B gearbox, which offered gear ratios of 2.0:1, 2.238:1, and most common 2.58:1. Later in production type C or E gearboxes were offered with gear ratios of 2.62:1, 3.0:1, 3.47:1, and 4.0:1. (The type E gearbox includes an integrated electric starter motor.) The standard engine includes a wide band expansion chamber exhaust system with an extra after-muffler as optional. The standard starter is a recoil start type, with an electric starter optional. An integral alternating current generator producing 170 watts at 12 volts with external rectifier-regulator is optional. The engine includes an intake air filter and can be fitted with an optional intake silencer system.

By July 2021, more than 30,000 engines had been sold.

In July 2021, the manufacturer announced that the engine's production run will end by the end of the year, although the engine will still be sold until stocks are depleted.

=== Limitations ===
Rotax recommends teardown and inspection every 150 hours, and overhaul every 300 hours.

The manufacturer acknowledges the design limitations of this engine, warning pilots:

"This engine, by its design, is subject to sudden stoppage. Engine stoppage can result in crash landings, forced landings or no power landings. Such crash landings can lead to serious bodily injury or death...This is not a certificated aircraft engine. It has not received any safety or durability testing, and conforms to no aircraft standards. It is for use in experimental, uncertificated aircraft and vehicles only in which an engine failure will not compromise safety. User assumes all risk of use, and acknowledges by his use that he knows this engine is subject to sudden stoppage...Never fly the aircraft equipped with this engine at locations, airspeeds, altitudes, or other circumstances from which a successful no-power landing cannot be made, after sudden engine stoppage. Aircraft equipped with this engine must only fly in DAYLIGHT VFR conditions."

== Applications ==
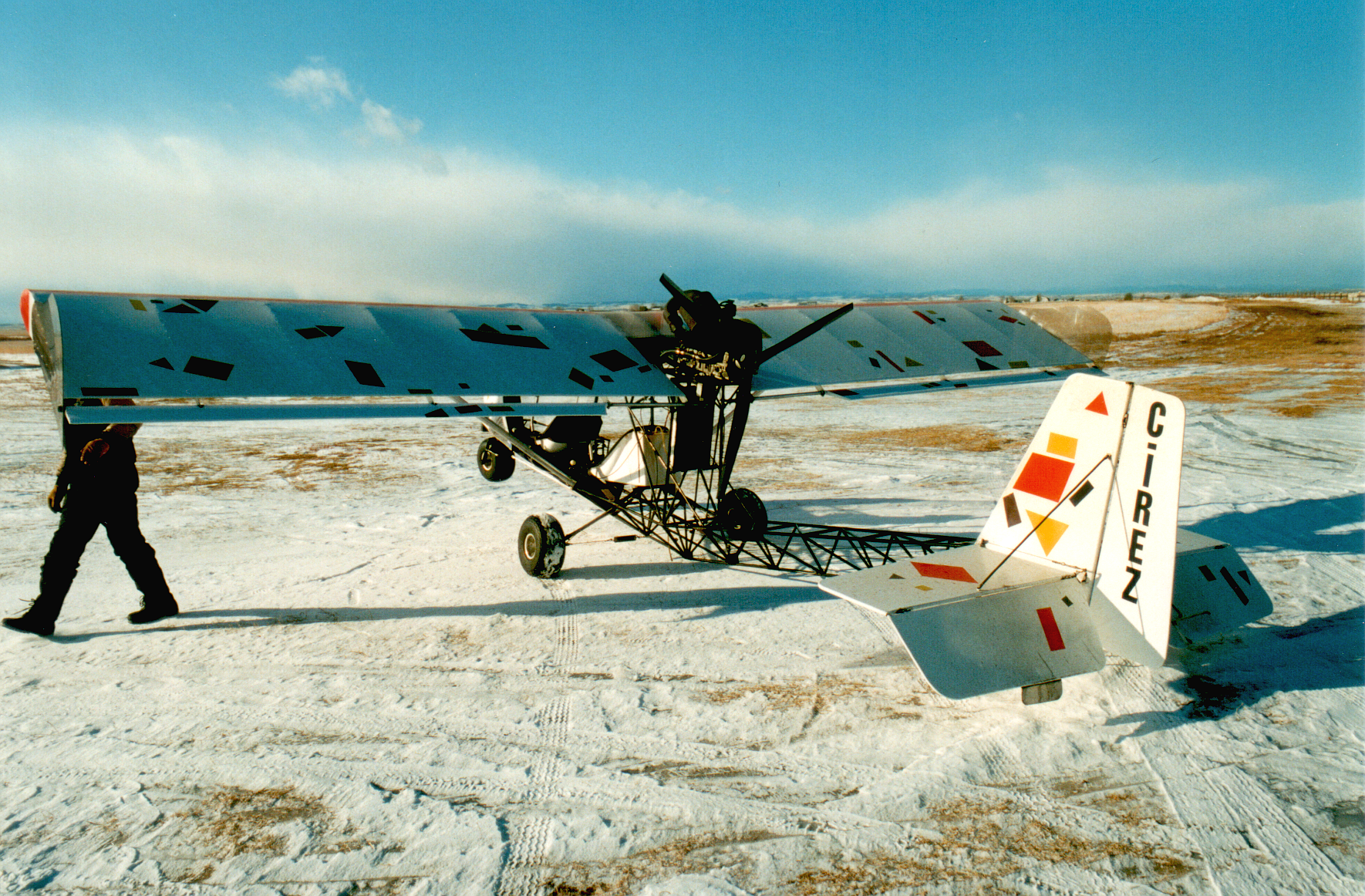
Blue Yonder EZ Flyer showing its Rotax 582 engine installation, including the radiator suspended below the engine.

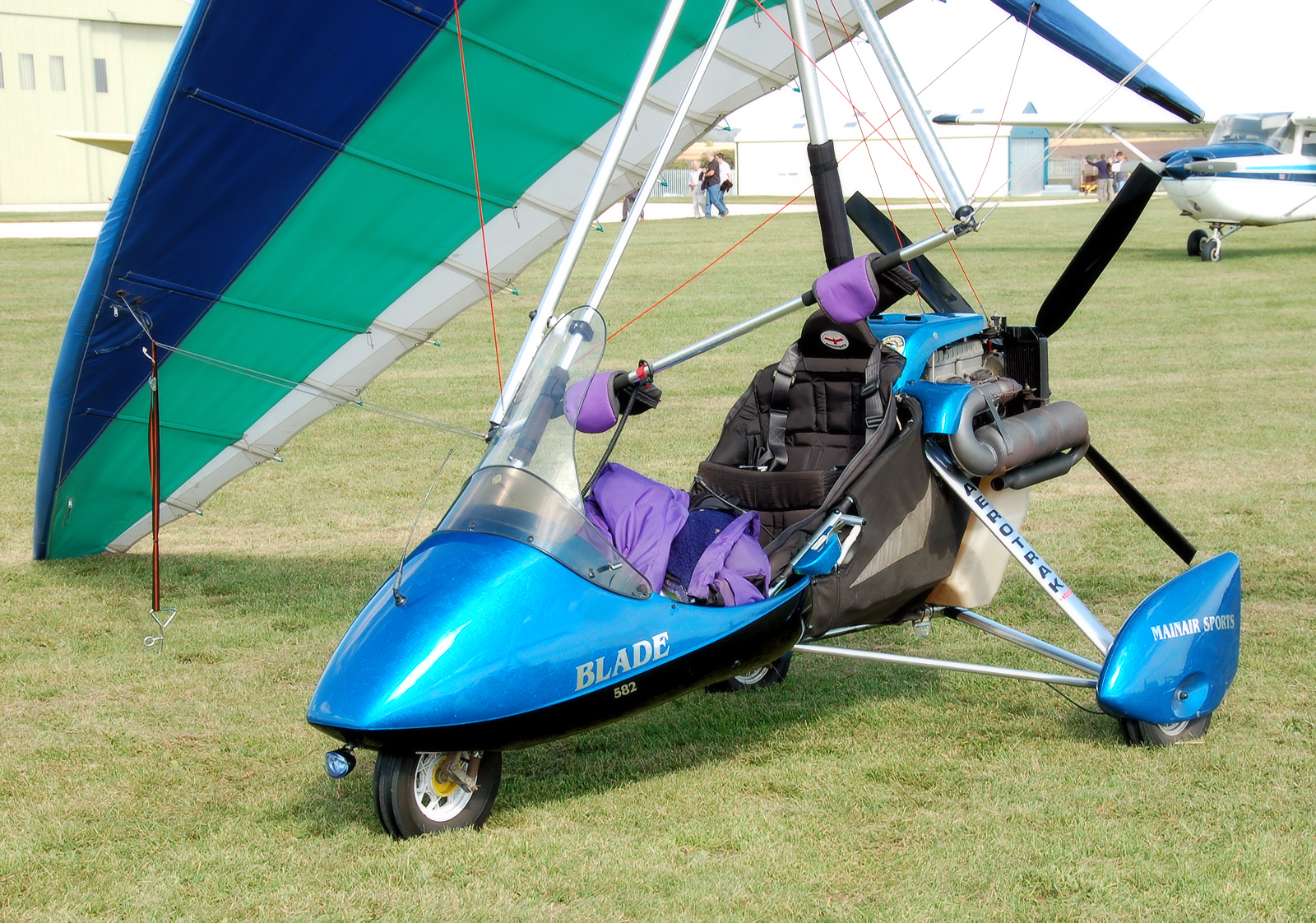
Mainair Blade 582

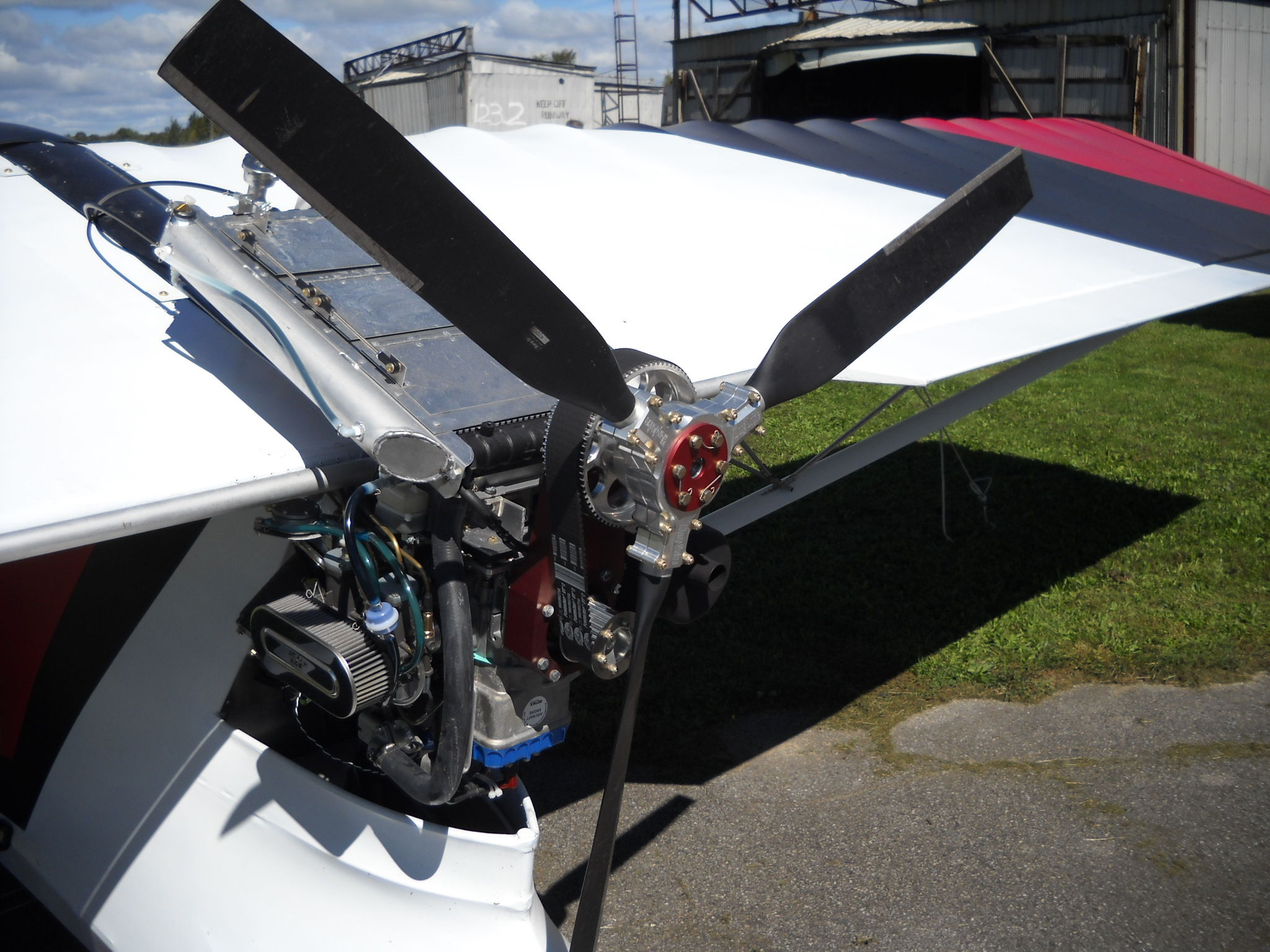
A Warp Drive Inc propeller mounted to a Rotax 582 on a Quad City Challenger II.

- Acrolite
- Advanced Aeromarine Buccaneer II
- Aero Adventure Aventura HP & Sport
- AeroLites AeroMaster AG
- AeroLites Bearcat
- Aeroplast Pluto A-65
- Aeroprakt A-20
- Aeros-2
- Aeros Cross Country
- Aeros del Sur Manta
- Aerosette MH-46 Eclipse
- Aéro Services Guépard Guêpe
- Airbet Girabet
- Airborne Edge
- Air Command Commander Elite
- Air Creation GT
- Air Creation Racer
- Air Creation Skypper
- Air Creation Tanarg
- Airdrome Dream Fantasy Twin
- Airdrome Fokker DR-1
- Airframes Unlimited SS-2 Trainer
- Airkraft Sunny
- Airsport Sonet
- Air Sylphe Bi 582
- Alliant Destiny Fusion
- Alliant Destiny XLT
- Anglin J6 Karatoo
- Antares MA-32
- Antonov T-2M Maverick
- Apex Dolphin 3
- Apollo Delta Jet
- Apollo Fox
- Apollo Jet Star
- Apollo Monsoon
- Apollo Racer GT
- Aquilair Kid
- Aquilair Swing
- Aeromarine Merlin
- Arnet Pereyra Sabre II
- ASAP Chinook Plus II
- ASAP RX 550 Plus Beaver
- ATEC 212 Solo
- Australian Lightwing GR 582
- Aviomania Genesis Solo G1SA
- Aviasouz Cruise
- Aviasud Mistral
- Aviate Raptor
- Aviation Products Star Trike
- Avid Catalina
- Avid Flyer
- Avio Design Swan
- BAaer Guri
- BB Microlight BB-two seater
- Biplanes Of Yesteryear Mifyter
- Blue Yonder EZ Flyer
- Blue Yonder Merlin
- Brock KB-3
- Buckeye Endeavor
- Buzzman L'il Buzzard
- Capella XS
- Capella T-Raptor
- Carlson Sparrow
- CBB O2
- Celier Kiss
- CFM Shadow
- Chernov Che-25
- Circa Reproductions Nieuport 12
- CGS Hawk
- Club ULM Rotor Ptenets-2
- Cosmos Phase II
- Cyclone AX2000
- DAR 21 Vector II
- DAR-23
- Denney Kitfox Model 2
- DTA Evolution
- DTA Feeling
- Earthstar Thunder Gull JT2
- Early Bird Jenny
- Ehroflug Coach II S
- Euro Fly Flash Light
- Eurofly Viper
- Excalibur Aircraft Excalibur
- Fantasy Air Allegro
- Fisher Classic
- Fisher Super Koala
- Fletcher Hercules
- Flightstar
- Flight Team Spider
- Fly Air Swallow
- Flying Machines FM301
- Flylab Tucano
- Fly Synthesis Catalina
- Fly Synthesis Wallaby
- FMP Qualt 201
- Freedom Lite SS-11 Skywatch
- FUL MA 30 Graffiti
- Gdecouv'R 582
- General Aviation Design Bureau T-32 Maverick
- Gemini Twin
- Gidroplan Che-22 Korvet
- Gidroplan Tsikada
- Golden Circle Air T-Bird
- Guépard II XJ01
- Guerpont Autoplum
- Harmening High Flyer
- Heldeberg Marathon
- Helite Skydancer
- Houde Speedmax
- Humbert La Moto Du Ciel
- Huntwing
- Hy-Tek Hurricane Hauler
- Infinity Purple
- InterPlane Skyboy
- J & J Ultralights Seawing
- Joplin Tundra
- Jora Jora
- Junkers Profly Junkers Trike
- Kolb Kolbra
- Kolb Mark III
- Kolb Slingshot
- Kolb Tandem
- Kompol Jazz
- Krasniye Kryl'ya Deltacraft MD-50C
- Laron Wizard
- Layzell Merlin
- Light Miniature Aircraft LM-1
- Light Miniature Aircraft LM-5
- Lockwood Drifter MU582
- Magni M-18 Spartan
- Mainair Blade
- Mainair Rapier
- Mariner Aircraft Mariner
- Masquito M58
- Micro Aviation B22 Bantam
- Microleve Corsario
- Microleve ML 450
- Microleve ML 500
- Moyes Dragonfly
- M-Squared Breese
- Murphy Maverick
- Murphy Renegade
- New Powerchutes Gemini
- Nickel & Foucard NF-2 Asterix
- Norman Aviation J6 Karatoo
- Norman Aviation Nordic II
- North American Rotorwerks Pitbull SS
- North Wing Apache
- North Wing Sport X2
- Paladin Golden Eagle
- Para-Ski Top Gun
- Para-Ski VX
- Para-Ski XS
- Peak Aerospace Me 109R
- Pegasus Quantum
- Personal Flight Sky-Tender
- Phantom X1
- Pipistrel Spider
- Polaris AM-FIB
- Polaris FIB
- Polaris Skin
- Powrachute Pegasus
- PowerTrike Evolution
- PowerTrike II
- Precision Tech Fergy
- Quad City Challenger II
- Quander Airpfeil
- Quicksilver GT500
- Quicksilver Sport 2S
- Rainbow Aerotrike
- Rainbow Cheetah
- Raisner Graffiti
- Raj Hamsa X-Air
- Ramphos Trident
- Rans S-6 Coyote II
- Rans S-7 Courier
- Rans S-9 Chaos
- Rans S-10 Sakota
- Rans S-11 Pursuit
- Rans S-12 Airaile
- Rans S-14 Airaile
- Revolution Mini-500 helicopter
- Rolandas Kalinauskas RK-6 Magic
- Rotorwing-Aero 3D-RV
- Schmidtler Enduro
- Schönleber Vento
- Sea and Sky Cygnet
- Sea-Bow International Sea-Bow
- Six Chuter SR1
- Six Chuter SR7
- Skyfly S-34 Skystar
- Skymaster Excel
- Skymaster Single Seater
- SkyReach BushCat
- Skyrider Sonic
- Skyrider Stingray
- Showers Skytwister Choppy
- SlipStream Genesis
- Solo Wings Aquilla
- Soaring Concepts Sky Trek
- Sport Copter Vortex
- Skywatch SS11
- Spectrum Beaver RX 650
- Sport Flight Talon
- Summit 2
- Summit Steel Breeze
- Sundog Two-Seater
- Sun Flightcraft Air-Chopper
- Sunward ST582
- Sunward STB582
- S-Wing Swing
- Synairgie Jet Ranger
- TechProAviation Merlin 100
- TeST TST-6 Duo
- Thruster T600 Sprint
- Tiger Club Development Sherwood Ranger
- Titan Tornado
- TL Ultralight TL-22 Duo
- TL Ultralight TL-32 Typhoon
- Two Wings Mariner UL
- Ultracraft Calypso
- Vol Xerpa ULM Pulsar
- Vortech Skylark
- WLT Sparrow
- World Seair Corp Seair
- Y2Fly Seahawk
- Zenith STOL CH 701

== Specifications (Rotax 582) ==
=== General characteristics ===
- Type: two-cylinder, two-stroke, rotary valve, oil-in-fuel or oil-injected lubrication, dual carburetors, electronic dual ignition
- Bore: 76 mm (2.99 in)
- Stroke: 64 mm (2.52 in)
- Displacement: 580.7 cm^{3} (35.44 cu in)
- Dry weight: 50 kg (110 lb) with electric starter, carburetors, fuel pump, air filters and reduction gear

=== Components ===
- Fuel type: premium unleaded: RON 90 octane or higher leaded or unleaded or AVGAS 100 LL
- Oil system: oil-in-fuel (pre-mix) or oil injection
- Cooling system: liquid cooled

=== Performance ===
- Power output: 48 kW (64.4 hp) at 6,500 RPM
- Compression ratio: 11.5 (theoretical) - 5.75 effective
- Power-to-weight ratio: 0.59 hp/lb (0.96 kW/kg)

== See also ==
- Rotax aircraft engines
- Arrow 500
- Hirth 3202
