= Personal Flight Sky-Bike Trike =

American powered parachute

Sky-Bike Trike

General information
- Type: Powered parachute
- National origin: United States
- Manufacturer: Personal Flight
- Status: Production completed

History
- Developed from: Personal Flight Sky-Bike

The Personal Flight Sky-Bike Trike is an American powered parachute that was designed and produced by Personal Flight of Kent, Washington. Now out of production, when it was available the aircraft was supplied as a kit for amateur construction.

== Design and development ==
A variant of the Personal Flight Sky-Bike, the Sky-Bike Trike adds a three-wheeled carriage to the Sky-Bike's seat pack, to turn the paramotor into a powered parachute. The three-wheeled frame carriage attaches in minutes, with a few ball-lock pins.

The aircraft was designed to comply with the US FAR 103 Ultralight Vehicles rules, including the category's maximum empty weight of 254 lb (115 kg). The aircraft has a standard empty weight of 80 lb (36 kg). It features a 374 sq ft (34.7 m^{2}) parachute-style wing, single-place accommodation, tricycle landing gear and a single 22 hp (16 kW) Zenoah G-25 engine in pusher configuration.

The aircraft carriage is built from a combination of bolted and welded aluminium tubing. In flight steering is accomplished via handles that actuate the canopy brakes, creating roll and yaw. The main landing gear incorporates spring rod suspension. The aircraft has a typical empty weight of 80 lb (36 kg) and a gross weight of 450 lb (200 kg), giving a useful load of 370 lb (170 kg). With full fuel of 3 U.S. gallons (11 L; 2.5 imp gal) the payload for the pilot and baggage is 352 lb (160 kg).

== Specifications (Sky-Bike Trike) ==
Data from Purdy

General characteristics

- Crew: one
- Wingspan: 42 ft 0 in (12.80 m)
- Wing area: 374.0 sq ft (34.75 m^{2})
- Aspect ratio: 4.7:1
- Empty weight: 80 lb (36 kg)
- Gross weight: 450 lb (204 kg)
- Fuel capacity: 3 U.S. gallons (11 L; 2.5 imp gal)
- Powerplant: 1 × Zenoah G-25 single cylinder, two-stroke, air-cooled aircraft engine, 22 hp (16 kW)
- Propellers: 2-bladed composite

Performance

- Maximum speed: 30 mph (48 km/h, 26 kn)
- Cruise speed: 25 mph (40 km/h, 22 kn)
- Service ceiling: 18,000 ft (5,500 m)
- Rate of climb: 300 ft/min (1.5 m/s)
- Wing loading: 1.2 lb/sq ft (5.9 kg/m^{2})
