= Nickel & Foucard NF-2 Asterix =

NF-2 Asterix

General information
- Type: Homebuilt aircraft
- National origin: France
- Manufacturer: Rudy Nickel

History
- First flight: 1987

The Nickel & Foucard NF-2 Asterix is a French two-seat monoplane built by Rudy Nickel and Joseph Foucard. Designed for amateur construction from plans, the prototype Asterix first flew in 1987.

== Design and development ==
The Astrix is a wood and fabric, tandem two-seat, high-wing monoplane with a pivoting wing, it is powered by 45 hp (34 kW) Citroen Visa converted motorcar engine, similar powered engines like the Rotax 582 have also been used.

== Specifications ==
Data from Brassey's World Aircraft & Systems Directory 1996

General characteristics

- Crew: 2
- Length: 5.15 m (16 ft 11 in)
- Wingspan: 7.5 m (24 ft 7 in)
- Empty weight: 200 kg (441 lb)
- Gross weight: 374 kg (825 lb)
- Powerplant: 1 × Citroen Visa converted motorcar engine, 34 kW (45 hp)

Performance

- Maximum speed: 144 km/h (90 mph, 78 kn)
- Cruise speed: 130 km/h (81 mph, 70 kn)landing speed 33 kn
- Range: 350 km (220 mi, 190 nmi)
- Rate of climb: 2.50 m/s (492 ft/min)
