= Mackenbach =

- Municipality
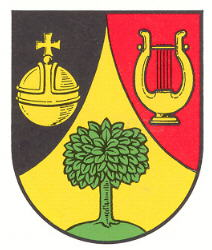
- Coat of arms

- Location of Mackenbach within Kaiserslautern district
- Interactive map of Mackenbach
- Location within Germany Location within Rhineland-Palatinate
- Coordinates: 49°28′18″N 7°35′08″E
- Country: Germany
- State: Rhineland-Palatinate
- District: Kaiserslautern
- Municipal assoc.: Weilerbach

Government
  - Mayor (2019–24): Daniel Schäffner (SPD)

Area
  - Total: 3.54 km^{2} (1.37 sq mi)
- Elevation: 264 m (866 ft)

Population (2025-12-31)
  - Total: 2,071
  - Density: 585/km^{2} (1,520/sq mi)
- Time zone: UTC+01:00 (CET)
  - Summer (DST): UTC+02:00 (CEST)
- Postal codes: 67686
- Dialling codes: 06374
- Vehicle registration: KL
- Website: www.weilerbach.de

Mackenbach (German pronunciation: [ˈmakn̩bax]) is a municipality in the district of Kaiserslautern, in Rhineland-Palatinate, western Germany. It is home to numerous restaurants and about 8 beauty salons and one grocery store.

== Culture and Sites ==
=== Music ===
Mackenbach's reputation as a musicians' village was established by the wandering musicians from the mid-19th century to the 1930s. They travelled with bands and circuses around the world in order to compensate for the poor income from agriculture in their homeland.

Today their music continues to be played in male voice choirs, in music societies and in Protestant church choirs.

=== Museums ===
The West Palatine Musicians Museum is dedicated to the West Palatine travelling musicians.
