= Formation flying =

Flight of multiple objects in a coordinated shape or pattern

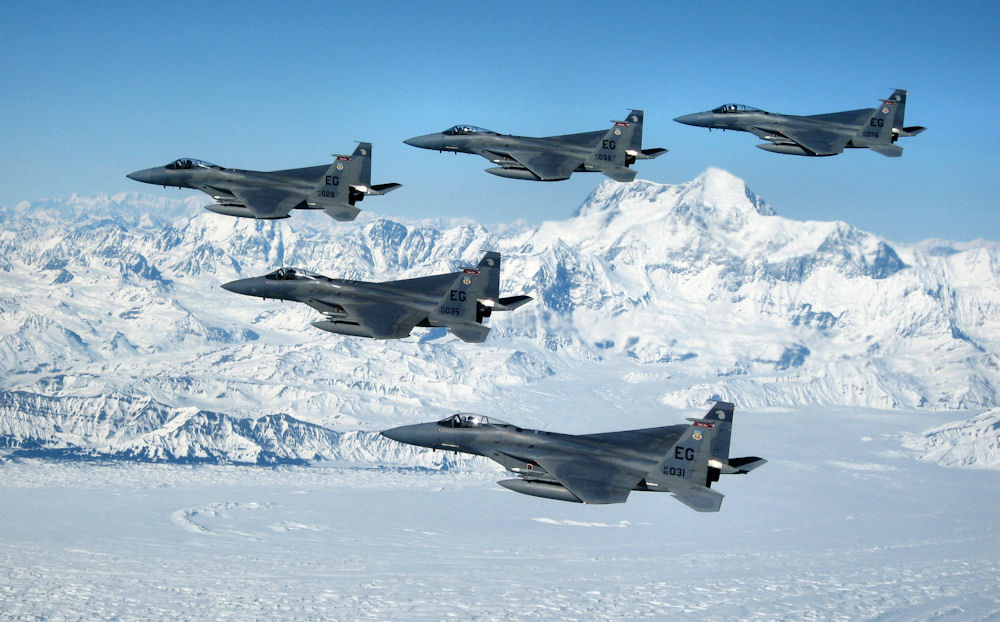
United States Air Force F-15C Eagles flying in a Vic formation over Alaska

Formation flying is the flight of multiple objects in coordination. Formation flying occurs in nature among flying and gliding animals, and is also conducted in human aviation, often in military aviation and at air shows.

A multitude of studies have been performed on the performance benefits of aircraft flying in formation.

== History ==
Birds have been known to receive performance benefits from formation flight for over a century, through the aerodynamic theory of Wieselsberger in 1914.

Formation flight in human aviation originated in World War I, when fighter aircraft were assigned to escort reconnaissance aircraft. It was found that pairs of aircraft were more combat effective than single aircraft, and therefore, military aircraft would always fly in formations of at least two. By World War II, pilots had discovered other strategic advantages to formation flight such as enhanced stability and optimal visibility.

== Close Formation ==
There are 5 main reasons for a close formation flight:

1. Reduce drag (below) by birds and airplanes.
2. Reduce radar cross-section. Could also lead to breaking away from each other in order to break the radar lock on the aircraft (shown on civilian films e.g. UK Jaguar pair).
3. Active self-defense with guns: WW2 B-17s bomber box.
4. When dragging a glider.
5. When performing air shows, e.g. aerobatics, arriving together at a reference point.

== Mechanism of drag reduction ==
It is a common misunderstanding to relate the reduction of drag in organized flight to the reduction of drag in drafting. However, they are quite different mechanistically.

The drag reduction occurred in the drafting is due to a reduction in flow speed in the wake of a leading vehicle, reducing the amount the flow needs to accelerate to move around the body, reducing pressure in front of the trailing vehicle. This leads to a lesser pressure differential between the frontal and rear projected surfaces of the body, and hence, less drag. This can also be understood somewhat tautologically through the common drag equation for a body $F_\text{D} = \frac{1}{2} C_\text{D} A \rho v^2$, where $C_\text{D}$ is the experimentally obtained unitless number, $\rho$ is the density of the fluid medium through which the object travels, $A$ is the cross-sectional area normal to the direction mean flow, and $v$ is the speed of the mean flow. It can be seen by inspection, that a decrease in mean velocity will generate less drag force, as is the case with drafting.

In juxtaposition, the drag reduction felt by trailing agents in formation flight may be thought more of as the trailing agents "surfing" on the vortices shed by wings of leading agents, reducing the amount of force needed to stay in the air. This force is known as lift and acts perpendicular to the freestream flow direction and drag. These vortices are known as wingtip vortices and are formed by fluid flowing around the wingtips from the high-pressure region that is on the bottom of the wing to the low-pressure region that is on the top of the wing. The flow becomes separated from the airfoil and rotates about a low pressure wake that forms the core of the vortex. This vortex acts to change the direction of the flow for trailing aircraft, increasing the lift over a segment of the wing and allowing for a reduction in induced drag by lowering its angle of attack.

This can also be shown by the drag and analogous lift equation, $F_\text{L} = \frac{1}{2} C_\text{L} A \rho v^2$. The difference now is that $C_\text{D}$ and $C_\text{L}$ vary linearly with angle of attack $\alpha$, which is the angle formed by the neutral axis of the aircraft and the freestream flow. Since the local flow is coming in at a higher angle of attack due to the vortex, both the lift and drag forces are rotated such that the lift force vector generates a forward thrust and the drag force vector generates an increase in lift. With this increase in lift force, the angle of attack may be reduced to maintain the target lift needed to maintain an altitude while cruising, which causes a reduction in induced drag since drag and lift are a function of $\alpha$ through the coefficients $C_\text{D}$ and $C_\text{L}$.

== Nature ==
=== Migrating birds ===
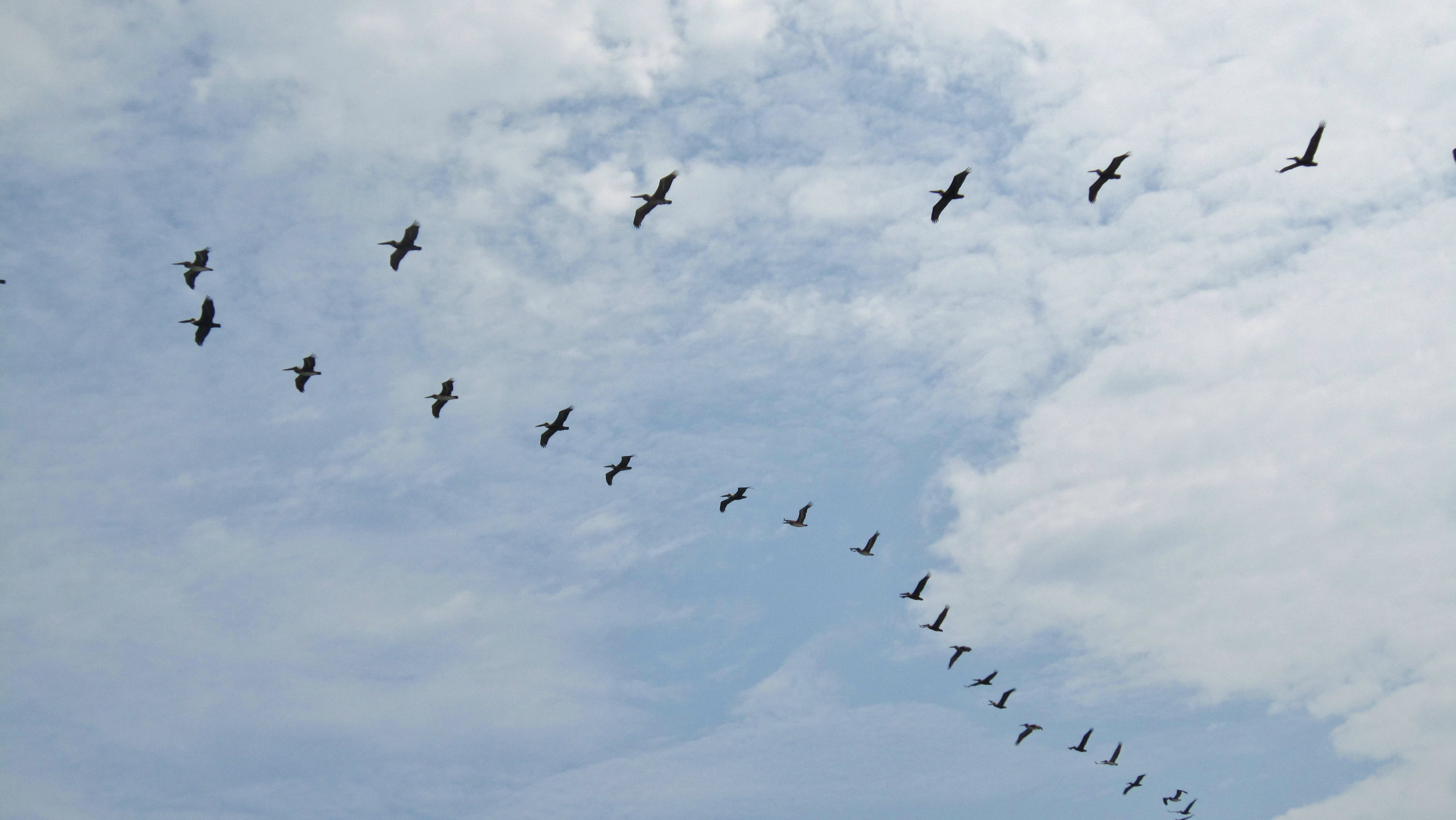
Pelicans flying in a V formation

Birds are typically observed to fly in V-shaped formations or J-shaped formations, the latter commonly known as echelon. The first study to attempt to quantify the energy saving of a large flock of birds was Lissaman & Schollenberger who provided the first, albeit notably flawed, estimate for a 25-member flock of birds. A most impressive 71% range extension relative to single bird flight was reported. These reported extensions are typically due to using a fixed wing approximation. Haffner (1977) experimented with birds flying in wind tunnels and calculated a range extension of a more conservative value of 22%.

Studies have been performed on the phase of flapping and found that birds that fly in V-shaped formations coordinate their flapping, while those in echelon do not. Willis et al (2007) found that optimal phasing of flaps accounts for 20% of power saving, suggesting that positioning is more important than perfectly caching the oncoming vortex.

Studies of birds have shown that the V formation can greatly enhance the overall aerodynamic efficiency by reducing the drag and thereby increasing the flight range.

=== Insects ===
Insect swarms are a collective animal behavior that is an area of active research for the application of drones. The unique feature of insect swarms is their leaderless, yet organized flight. In a particle image velocimetry study of 10 midges by Kelley and Ouellette (2013), the boundaries of the swarm are statistically consistent even though the flying of the insects within the swarm are virtually asynchronous. There is also some suggestion of clustering, implying there may be some self-organizing behavior.

== Aviation ==
=== Terminology and examples ===
The smallest unit of a formation is called a section or element, consisting of two aircraft; these pilots are a leader and wingman. A division or flight consists of two sections or elements. Multiple divisions or flights are assembled into a formation. A standard fighter formation includes aircraft whose positions are maintained by the wingmen to within 1 mi (1.6 km) laterally and 100 ft (30 m) vertically of the flight leader's aircraft. A nonstandard formation results when the flight leader has requested, and air traffic control has approved dimensions that do not conform with the stated boundaries; when operating within an authorized altitude reservation or under the provisions of a Letter of Agreement; or when flight operations are being conducted in a specially designated airspace.

Fingertip four formation, strong right

The fingertip four (or finger-four) is the basic four-ship formation that resembles the position of the fingertips with the hand outstretched. The flight leader (#1) is piloting the foremost aircraft (middle fingertip), with the lead's wingman (#2) to the side and trailing (index fingertip); the section lead (#3) is opposite the lead's wingman on the opposite side (ring fingertip) while the section leader's wingman (#4) is trailing the section lead towards the same side (little fingertip). The fingertip formation is designated strong right or strong left, depending on the side being flown by the section (#3 and #4) aircraft. For example, viewed from overhead, the fingertip four strong right formation from left to right consists of the #2 (lead's wingman), #1 (flight leader), #3 (section lead), and #4 (section lead's wingman) aircraft.

The flight leader should decide and communicate which orientation, fingertip right or fingertip left, should be used as the basic formation prior to flight operations. Formations should transition to and from the basic formation to facilitate the use of hand and plane signals.

4-ship formation transitions
Transition		Diagram	Signal	Description & sequence
From	To	Diagram	Signal	Description & sequence
Fingertip right	Echelon right		Flight leader's left arm bent 90°, fist clenched	#3 moves section out and back, #2 crosses over to #1's right wing
Echelon right	Fingertip right		Flight leader's right arm bent 90°, fist clenched; #2 passes same signal to #3	#3 moves section out to give space for #2 to cross over to #1's left wing; #3 moves section back to lead's right wing once #2 is done
Fingertip right	Echelon left		Flight leader's right arm bent 90°, fist clenched, two arm pumps	#3 moves section to #2's left wing, #4 crosses under #3 as the element is crossing under #2
Echelon left	Fingertip right		Flight leader's left arm bent 90°, fist clenched, two arm pumps	#3 moves section to lead's right wing, #4 crosses over to #3's right wing
Fingertip right	Diamond		Flight leader's arm bent 90°, fist clenched; four fingers extend, then closes hand with thumb pointing rearward and motioning aft; #3 relays signal to #4; #3 signals thumbs-up to lead when complete	#4 moves into slot
Diamond	Fingertip right		Flight leader gently rocks wings	#4 moves from slot to #3's wing
Fingertip right	Trail		Flight leader gently porpoises several times; each pilot signals lead verbally when in position	#2 slides back and behind lead, followed by #3, then #4 in sequence
Trail	Fingertip right		Flight leader rocks wings several times, then starts shallow turn	#2 moves forward to join on lead's inside wing; #3 and #4 join as an element, then take position on lead's outside wing.

=== Military ===
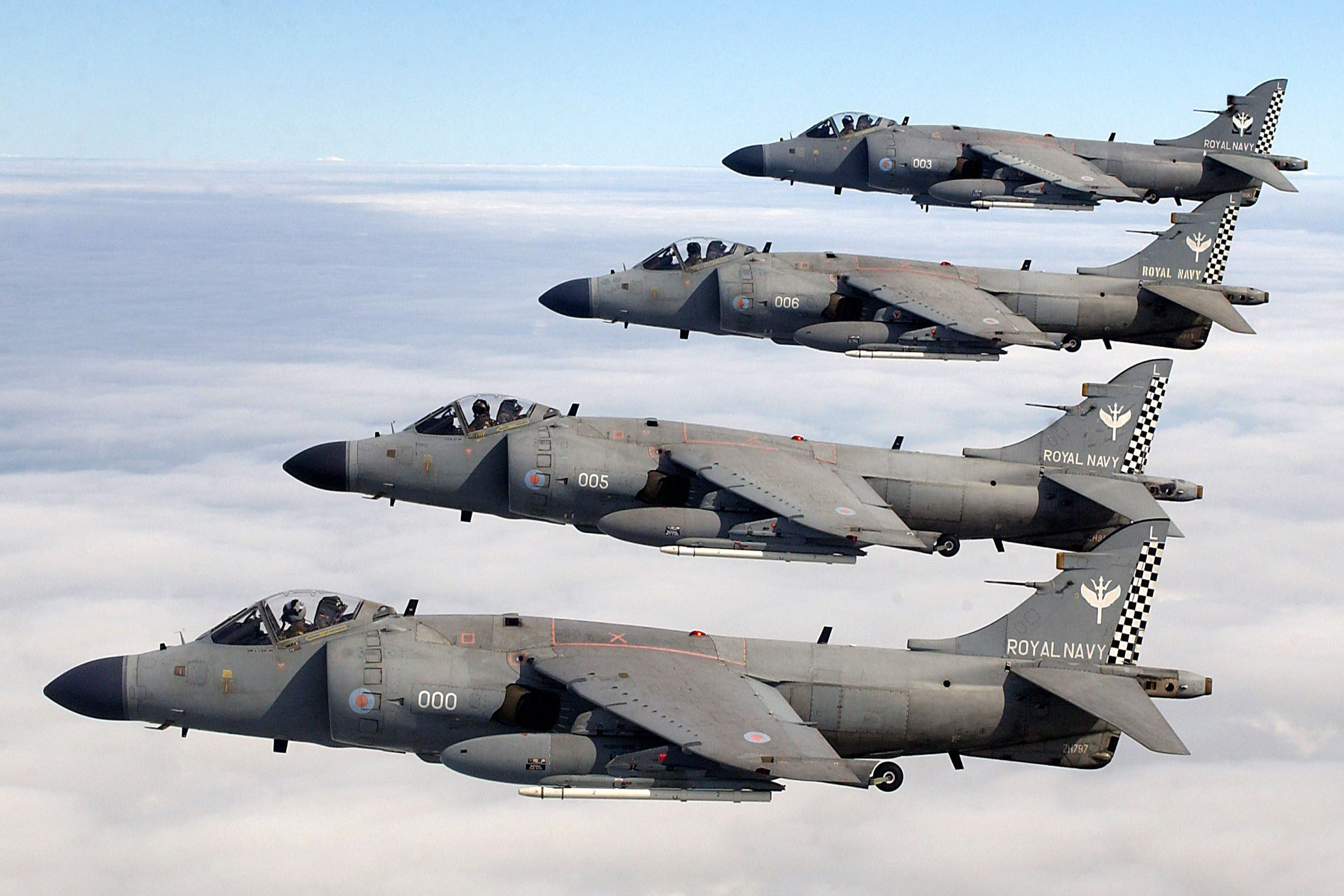
Royal Navy Sea Harriers flying in an echelon formation

In military aviation, tactical formation flying is the disciplined flight of two or more aircraft under the command of a flight leader. Military pilots use tactical formations for mutual defense and concentration of firepower.

=== Unmanned aerial vehicles ===
The challenge of achieving safe formation flight by unmanned aerial vehicles has been extensively investigated in the 21st century with aircraft and spacecraft systems. For aerial vehicles the advantages of performing formation flight include fuel saving, improved efficiency in air traffic control and cooperative task allocation. For space vehicles precise control of formation flight may enable future large aperture space telescopes, variable baseline space interferometers, autonomous rendezvous and docking and robotic assembly of space structures. One of the simplest formations used is where autonomous aircraft maintain formation with a lead aircraft which may itself be autonomous.

=== Civil aviation ===
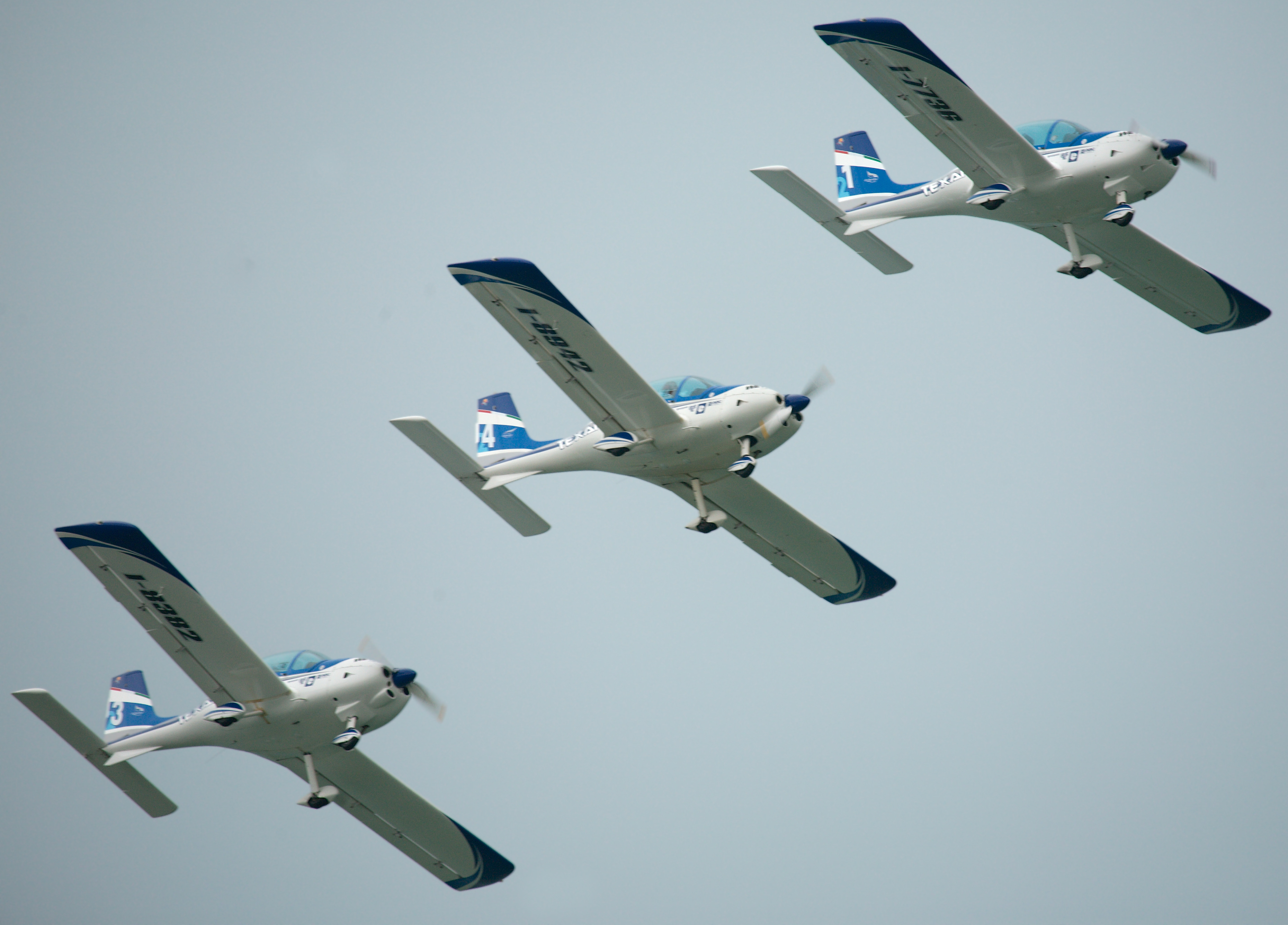
WeFly! Team of Fly Synthesis Texans at an airshow

In civil aviation formation flying is performed at air shows or for recreation. It is used to improve flying technique and also as a prestigious activity of old aviation organizations. It represents the more challenging skill of flying near another aircraft. Formation flying proposed to reduce fuel use by minimizing drag.

In the early 2000s, NASA's Autonomous Formation Flight program used a pair of F/A-18s. In 2013, the Air Force Research Laboratory's Surfing Aircraft Vortices for Energy project showed 10–15% in fuel savings, installed on two Boeing C-17 Globemaster IIIs. In 2017, NASA measured 8–10% lower fuel flow with two Gulfstream III aircraft on wake surfing test flights. In 2018, the ecoDemonstrator, a Boeing 777F freighter from FedEx Express, had its fuel consumption reduced by 5–10% with the autopilot maintaining the 4,000 ft (1.2 km) separation based on ADS-B and TCAS information.

By taking advantage of wake updraft like migrating birds (biomimicry), Airbus believes an aircraft can save 5–10% of fuel by flying 1.5–2 nmi (2.8–3.7 km) behind the preceding one. After Airbus A380s tests showing 12% savings, it launched its 'fello'fly' project in November 2019 for test flights in 2020 with two A350s, before transatlantic flight trials with airlines in 2021. Certification for shorter separation is enabled by ADS-B in oceanic airspace, and the only modification required would be flight control systems software. Comfort would not be affected and trials are limited to two aircraft to reduce complexity but the concept could be expanded to include more. Commercial operations could begin in 2025 with airline schedule adjustments, and other manufacturers' aircraft could be included.

On 9 November 2021, Airbus performed a 7 h 40 min Toulouse-Montreal demonstration with an A350-900 and A350-1000 separated by 3 km (1.6 nmi), saving over 6 t (13,000 lb) of carbon dioxide: a potential of more than 5% fuel savings. Partly funded by the EU SESAR air traffic management research, Airbus' Geese initiative will include Air France and French Bee A350s for flight trials in 2025 to 2026, and will include Boeing for interoperability.

== See also ==
- Aerobatics – Flying maneuvers involving attitudes not attained during normal flight
- Finger-four – Fighter aircraft flight formation
- Flypast – Ceremonial or honorific aircraft flight
- Formation Light – Aircraft lighting for formation flying
- Satellite formation flying
- Swarm robotics – Coordination of multiple robots as a system
- Vic formation – Military aircraft formation
