= Wallaby (disambiguation) =

A wallaby is the informal name for any of about thirty species of Australian marsupials.

Wallaby or Wallabies may also refer to:

- Wallaby, Japanese fantasy manga
- Sopwith Wallaby, British single-engined biplane
- The Wallabies, nickname of the Australia national rugby union team
- Wallabee, line of shoes manufactured by C. & J. Clark
- The Wallaby ULM aeroplane by Fly Synthesis
- Adobe Wallaby from Adobe is a Flash-to-HTML5 Conversion Tool
- A semantic configuration service for the Condor High-Throughput Computing System, developed by Red Hat
- Wallaby (ferry), a ferry that operated on Sydney Harbour from 1879.
- The WALLABY (Widefield ASKAP L-Band Legacy All-Sky Blind Survey) astronomical survey with the ASKAP telescope
