= Fly Synthesis Catalina =

Italian ultralight aircraft

Catalina
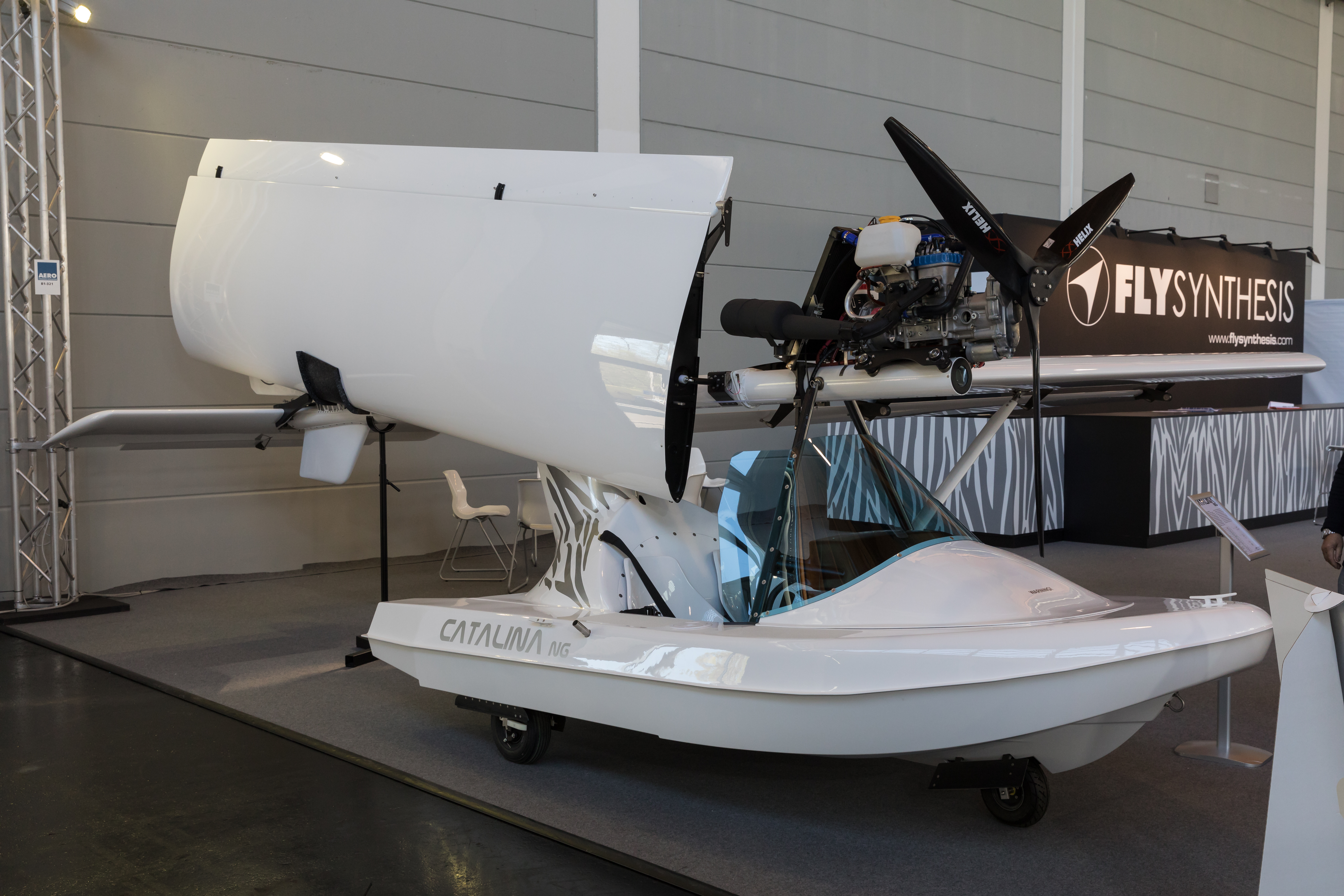

General information
- Type: Ultralight and light-sport amphibious flying boat
- National origin: Italy
- Manufacturer: Fly Synthesis
- Status: In production

History
- Introduction date: 2010

The Fly Synthesis Catalina NG is an Italian ultralight and light-sport amphibious flying boat, designed and produced by Fly Synthesis, introduced at the Aero show held in Friedrichshafen in 2010. The aircraft is supplied as a complete ready-to-fly-aircraft.

== Design and development ==
The manufacturer says the design borrowed from the development of the earlier Fly Synthesis Storch, stating, "The Catalina NG project evolved from the Storch amphibious aircraft experience".

The Catalina was designed to comply with the Fédération Aéronautique Internationale microlight rules and US light-sport aircraft rules. It features a strut-braced high-wing, a two-seats-in-side-by-side configuration open cockpit, electrically retractable tricycle landing gear and a single engine in tractor configuration.

The aircraft is made from composite material, predominantly carbon fibre and fibreglass. Its 9.47 m (31.1 ft) span wing has an area of 12.6 m^{2} (136 sq ft) and electrically-operated flaperons. The standard engine available is the 64 hp (48 kW) Rotax 582 two-stroke powerplant. Folding wings and a ballistic parachute are optional equipment.

== Specifications (Catalina NG) ==
Data from Manufacturer and Bayerl

General characteristics

- Crew: one
- Capacity: one passenger
- Length: 6.28 m (20 ft 7 in)
- Wingspan: 9.47 m (31 ft 1 in)
- Height: 2.49 m (8 ft 2 in)
- Wing area: 12.6 m^{2} (136 sq ft)
- Empty weight: 292 kg (644 lb)
- Gross weight: 495 kg (1,091 lb)
- Fuel capacity: 50 litres (11 imp gal; 13 US gal) in two 25 litres (5.5 imp gal; 6.6 US gal) tanks
- Powerplant: 1 × Rotax 582 twin cylinder, liquid-cooled, two stroke aircraft engine, 48 kW (64 hp)

Performance

- Cruise speed: 125 km/h (78 mph, 67 kn)
- Stall speed: 60 km/h (37 mph, 32 kn)
- Never exceed speed: 150 km/h (93 mph, 81 kn)
- g limits: +4/-2
- Rate of climb: 4.5 m/s (890 ft/min)
- Wing loading: 39.3 kg/m^{2} (8.0 lb/sq ft)
