= Fly Synthesis Syncro =

Italian ultralight and light-sport aircraft

Syncro
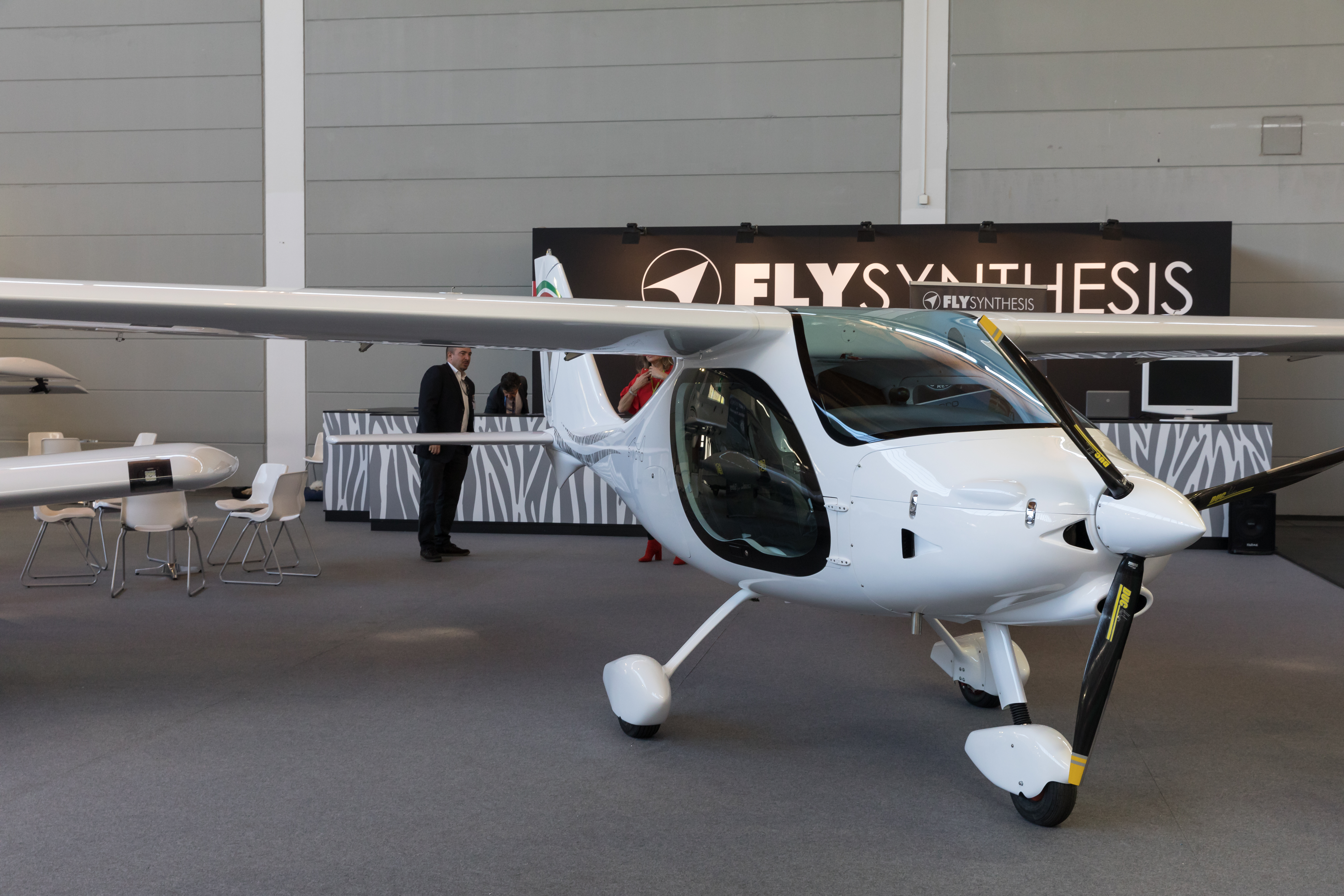

General information
- Type: Ultralight aircraft and Light-sport aircraft
- National origin: Italy
- Manufacturer: Fly Synthesis
- Status: In production

History
- Introduction date: 2009

The Fly Synthesis Syncro is an Italian ultralight and light-sport aircraft, designed and produced by Fly Synthesis, introduced at the Aero show held in Friedrichshafen in 2009. The aircraft is supplied as a complete ready-to-fly-aircraft.

== Design and development ==
The aircraft was designed to comply with the Fédération Aéronautique Internationale microlight rules and US light-sport aircraft rules. It features a cantilever high-wing, a two-seats-in-side-by-side configuration enclosed open cockpit, fixed tricycle landing gear and a single engine in tractor configuration.

The aircraft is made from composites, predominantly carbon fibre. Its 10.4 m (34.1 ft) span wing has an area of 10.54 m^{2} (113.5 sq ft) and flaps. The standard engine available is the 100 hp (75 kW) Rotax 912ULS four-stroke powerplant.

== Operational history ==
Reviewer Marino Boric described the design in a 2015 review as "one of the most attractive aircraft unveiled at the 2009 Friedrichshafen show".

== Variants ==
Syncro ULM
Model for the European FAI microlight category with 472.5 kg (1,042 lb) gross weight.
Syncro LSA
Model for the US LSA category with 600 kg (1,323 lb) gross weight.

== Specifications (Syncro ULM) ==
Data from Bayerl

General characteristics

- Crew: one
- Capacity: one passenger
- Length: 6.75 m (22 ft 2 in)
- Wingspan: 10.4 m (34 ft 1 in)
- Height: 2.26 m (7 ft 5 in)
- Wing area: 10.54 m^{2} (113.5 sq ft)
- Empty weight: 289 kg (637 lb)
- Gross weight: 472.5 kg (1,042 lb)
- Fuel capacity: 100 litres (22 imp gal; 26 US gal)
- Powerplant: 1 × Rotax 912ULS four cylinder, liquid and air-cooled, four stroke aircraft engine, 75 kW (101 hp)

Performance

- Maximum speed: 295 km/h (183 mph, 159 kn)
- Cruise speed: 230 km/h (140 mph, 120 kn)
- Stall speed: 64 km/h (40 mph, 35 kn)
- Never exceed speed: 295 km/h (183 mph, 159 kn)
- Range: 1,200 km (750 mi, 650 nmi) with 30 minutes reserve
- g limits: +5/-3
- Rate of climb: 6.5 m/s (1,280 ft/min)
- Wing loading: 44.83 kg/m^{2} (9.18 lb/sq ft)
