= 2026 Beijing Sunward SA 60L crash =

Aviation accident in Beijing, China

2026 China Zun Plane crash
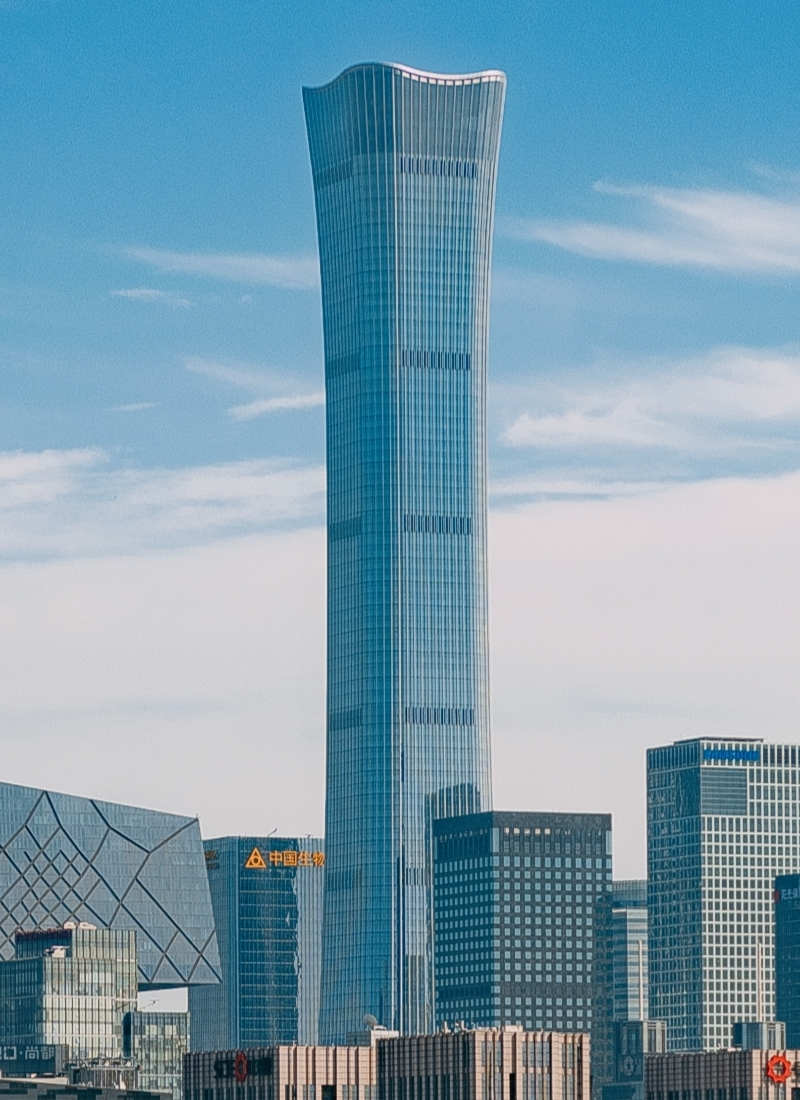
- The China Zun, the tower that the plane crashed into

Incident
- Date: 26 June 2026; 4 months ago
- Summary: Suicide by pilot
- Site: China Zun, Chaoyang, Beijing, China; 39°54′43″N 116°27′46.60″E
- Total fatalities: 1
- Total injuries: 13

Aircraft
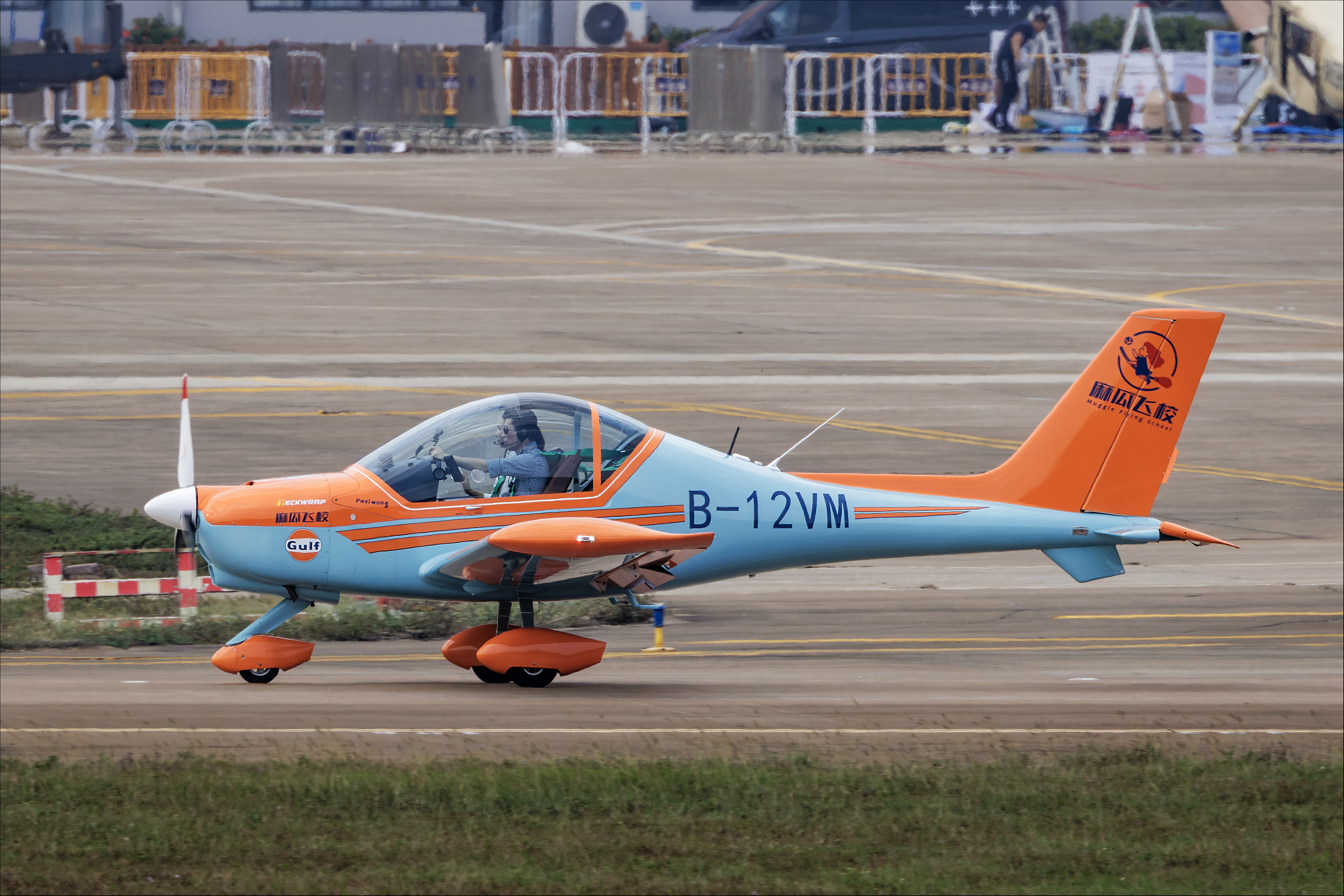
- A Sunward SA 60L Aurora similar to the aircraft involved
- Aircraft type: Sunward SA 60L Aurora
- Operator: Shuangyue General Aviation
- Registration: B-12PP
- Flight origin: Beijing Shifosi Airport, Beijing, China
- Destination: Beijing, China
- Occupants: 1
- Crew: 1
- Fatalities: 1
- Survivors: 0

Ground casualties
- Ground injuries: 13

On 26 June 2026, a light plane crashed into the upper floors of the China Zun after flying into highly restricted Beijing airspace. The crash caused 13 injuries inside the building and on the ground, while the pilot was the only fatality.

== Aircraft and pilot ==
The aircraft involved was a Sunward SA 60L Aurora operated by Shuangyue General Aviation and registered B-12PP.

The pilot was a 66-year-old male, Liu Junhua, who had flown the exact aircraft several times before. However, he reportedly had severe anxiety and had previously noted suicidal thoughts in his diary.

== Crash ==
The aircraft took off at around 17:30 LT heading west. According to data from Flightradar24, the airport the aircraft took off from was about 30 miles east of downtown Beijing. It was last seen on radar heading east of East Third Ring Road before Liu seemingly turned off the aircraft's transponder. Shortly after, the plane entered highly restricted airspace in Beijing while also nearing Zhongnanhai, the central leadership compound which is a total no-fly zone. Liu then turned towards the China Zun tower, reaching a final altitude of 1,032 feet. The aircraft crashed into the upper floors of the building at 17:55 LT.

== Aftermath ==
Almost immediately after the plane made impact, several pieces of debris, including most of the tail section, fell towards the ground, causing a fire near the bottom of the building as well. The tower was swiftly evacuated. No ground fatalities were reported, with 13 people being injured. Liu Junhua was most likely killed upon impact. Meanwhile, the tower only suffered minor fire damage and two shattered windows.

Despite footage of the incident being uploaded to social media, most of it was soon deleted, most likely by Chinese authorities. The country and their aviation firm also released very little further information regarding the incident. Some officials stated that they were instructed "not to discuss it".

== Impact ==
After the incident, China's government introduced stricter regulations regarding drone ownership. They also made the decision to ban drone operation, ownership, transportation, and storage in Beijing unless an exception is made. These restrictions will enter effect on 15 November 2026.

On 20 September 2026, a flight restriction zone above Beijing close to the size of Italy was put into effect. A complete no-fly zone was also be introduced around the capital.

== See also ==
- 1945 Empire State Building B-25 crash
- 2002 Pirelli Tower airplane crash
- 2002 Tampa Cessna 172 crash
- 2005 Iranian Air Force C-130 crash
- 2006 New York City Cirrus SR20 crash
- 2010 Austin suicide attack
- Suicide by aircraft
