= Fly Synthesis Wallaby =

Wallaby

General information
- Type: Microlight cabin monoplane
- National origin: Italy
- Manufacturer: Fly Synthesis

The Fly Synthesis Wallaby is an Italian two-seat, microlight monoplane manufactured by Fly Synthesis.

== Design and development ==
The Wallaby is a high-wing monoplane with a high tail boom and with a 37 kW (50 hp) Rotax 503 piston engine fitted in front of the wing. Below the wing is an enclosed cabin with two seats and a fixed tricycle landing gear. The aircraft is available built or as a kit. A Rotax 582 powered variant, the Wallaby R582 is also available.

The design uses the wing from the Storch CL mated to a new high tailboom fuselage design, with the design goal of producing an economical aircraft.

The aircraft is sold as the Lafayette Wallaby in the United States.

== Operational history ==
Reviewer Marino Boric described the design in a 2015 review as "very pleasant to fly".

== Variants ==
Wallaby R503
Rotax 503 powered
Wallaby R582
Rotax 582 powered

== Specifications (Wallaby R503) ==
Data from World Directory of Leisure Aviation

General characteristics

- Crew: 1
- Capacity: 1 passenger
- Wingspan: 9.43 m (30 ft 11 in)
- Wing area: 12.6 m^{2} (136 sq ft)
- Empty weight: 208 kg (459 lb)
- Gross weight: 425 kg (937 lb)
- Powerplant: 1 × Rotax 503 piston engine , 37 kW (50 hp)

Performance

- Maximum speed: 145 km/h (90 mph, 78 kn)
- Rate of climb: 2.5 m/s (492 ft/min)
