= Fly Synthesis =

Italian aircraft manufacturer

Coordinates: 45.9677117°N 13.2347673°E

Gryphen Aircraft (ex. Fly Synthesis)
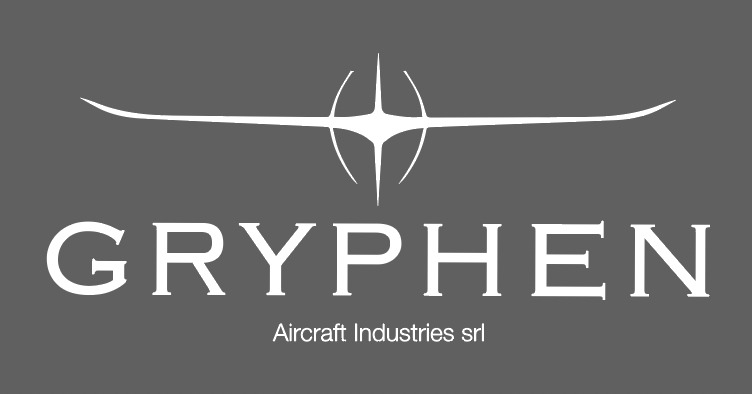
- Company type: Private company
- Industry: Aerospace
- Headquarters: Mortegliano, Italy
- Products: Ultralight aircraft
- Website: www.gryphen.it

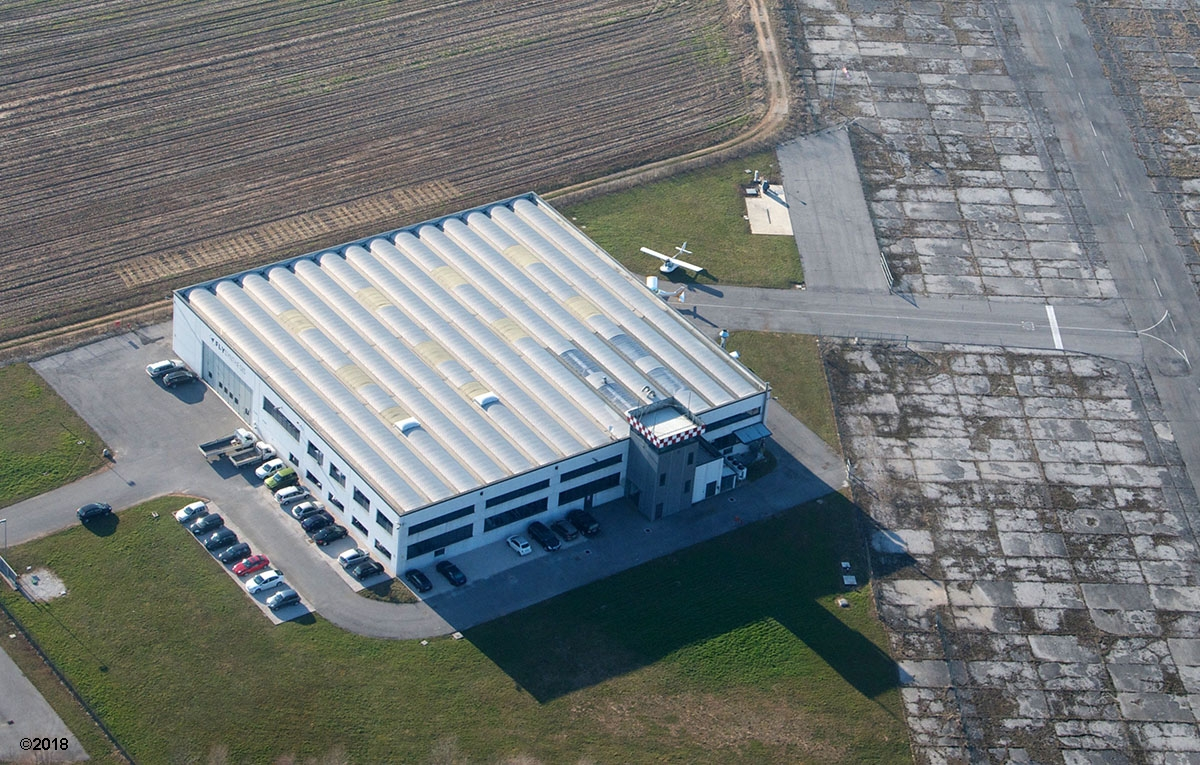

Gryphen Aircraft Industries Srl. (ex-Fly Synthesis Srl) is an Italian aircraft manufacturer based in Mortegliano. The company specializes in the design and manufacture of carbon fibre ultralight aircraft.

Founded in the late 1980s in Gonars, the company produced its first aircraft, the Storch in 1990. The company was sold to new owners, in 2000. In 2006 the company moved to its present location, a 3,000 m^{2} (32,000 sq ft) modern and efficient facility beside the old WW2 military base in Mortegliano.

During 2024, Gryphen Aircraft Industries Srl (ex-Fly Synthesis) purchased all the assets and the factory in Mortegliano (UD), Italy, and is now manufacturing again the famous aircraft (listed below)

== Aircraft ==
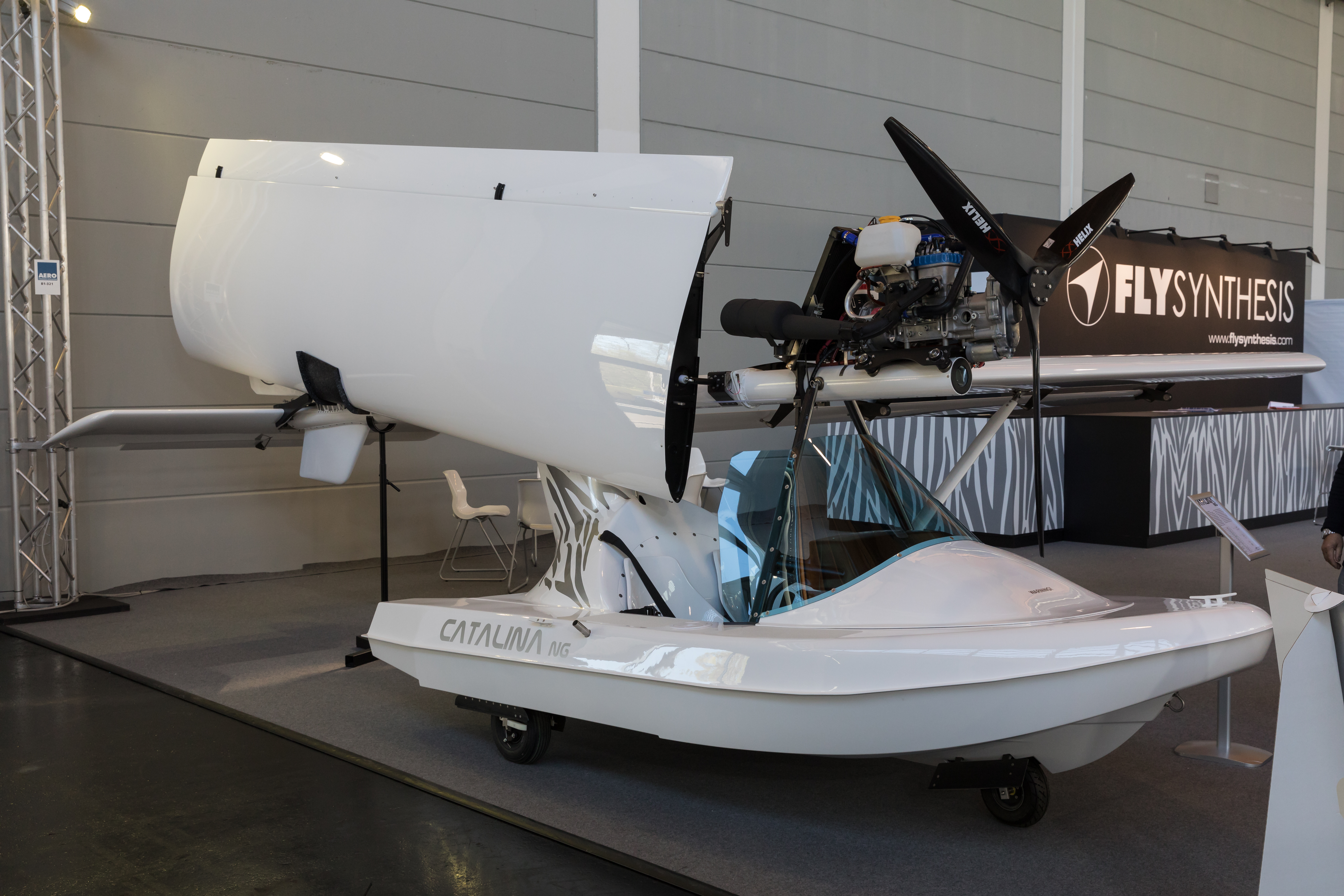
Fly Synthesis Catalina

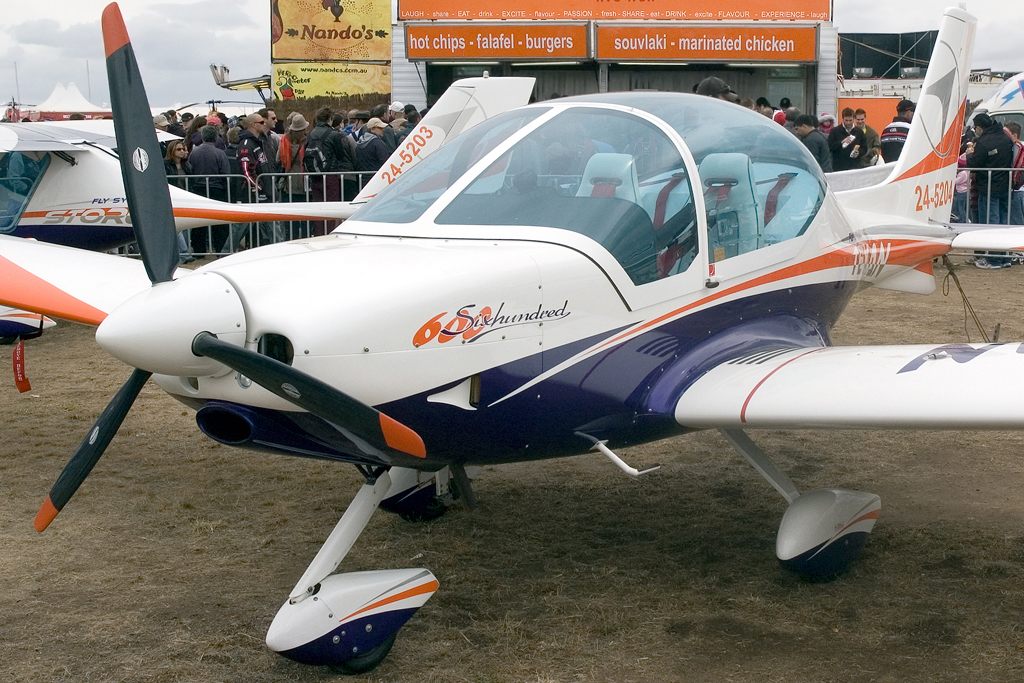
Fly Synthesis Texan

Summary of aircraft built by Fly Synthesis
Model name	Introduced	Number built	Type
Fly Synthesis Catalina	2010		high-wing, single engine, amphibious, ultralight aircraft
Fly Synthesis Storch	1990		high-wing, single engine ultralight aircraft
Fly Synthesis Syncro	2009		high-wing, single engine ultralight aircraft
Fly Synthesis Texan	1999		low-wing, single engine ultralight aircraft
Fly Synthesis Wallaby			high-wing, single engine ultralight aircraft
