= Sunward SA 60L Aurora =

Chinese light-sport aircraft

SA 60L Aurora
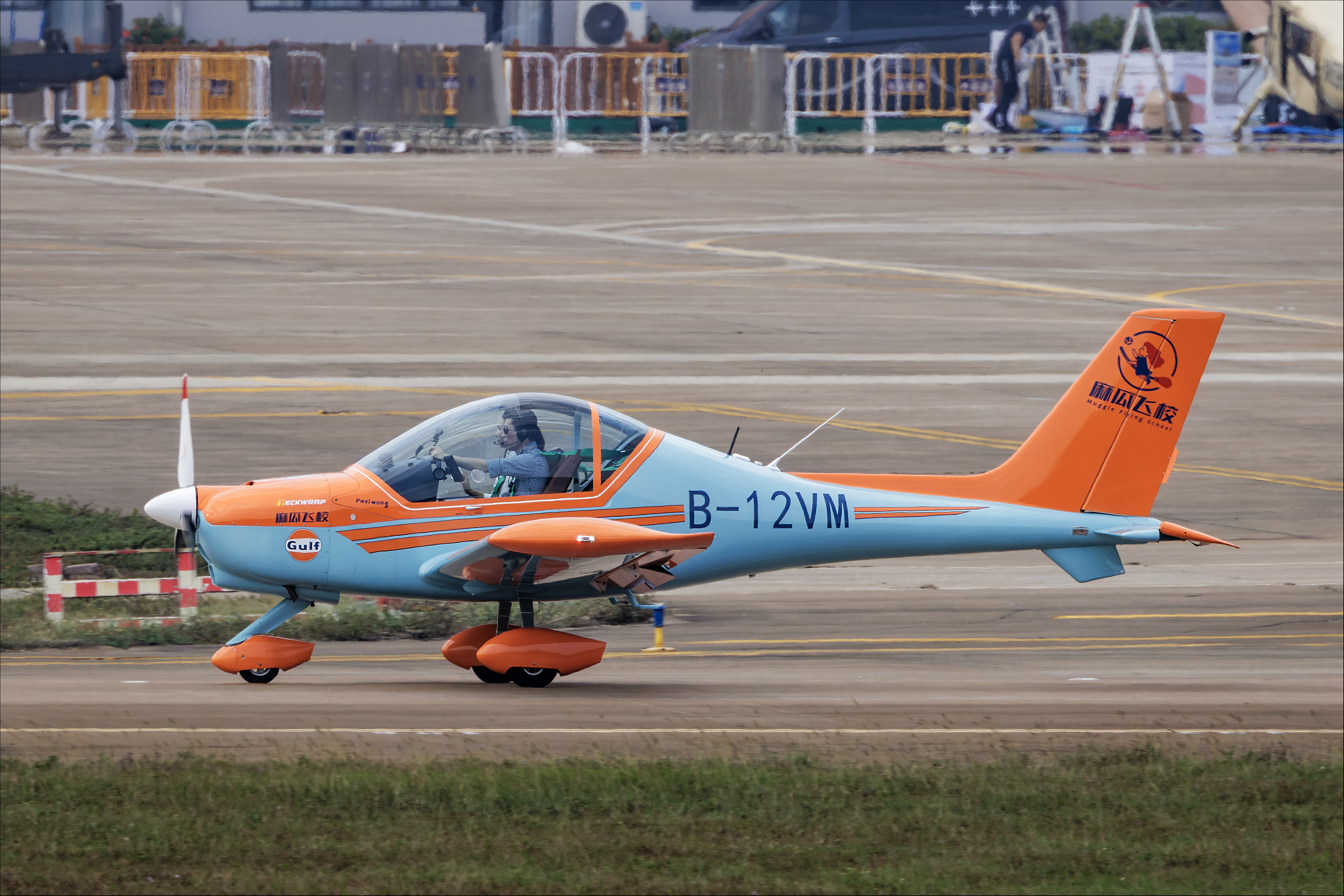
- A Aurora plane

General information
- Type: Light-sport aircraft
- National origin: China
- Manufacturer: Sunward Aircraft
- Status: In production

The Sunward SA 60L Aurora is a Chinese light-sport aircraft, designed and produced by Sunward Aircraft, a division of Hunan Science and Technologies Co Ltd, an industrial machine manufacturer located in the Lu Gu High Technology Development Zone. The aircraft is intended to be supplied as a complete ready-to-fly-aircraft.

== Design and development ==
The Aurora was designed to comply with the US light-sport aircraft rules. It features a cantilever low-wing, a two-seats-in-side-by-side configuration enclosed cockpit under a bubble canopy, fixed tricycle landing gear and a single engine in tractor configuration. The aircraft's 8.6 m (28.2 ft) span wing has a rectangular planform and employs flaps. The standard engine available is the Austrian-made 75 kW (100 hp) Rotax 912ULS four-stroke powerplant.

The Civil Aviation Administration of China granted the design a type design approval in mid-2013.

Bayerl et al. note that the Aurora closely resembles the Fly Synthesis Texan, but that the manufacturer claims the Aurora is an original design.

The aircraft can be equipped for banner-towing, aerial photography and has an airshow smoke generation system available.

In July 2014 the company announced an improved version, the SA 60V, with an upgraded engines installation using Austrian, rather than Chinese components and an IFR capable instrument panel.

The design was added to the Federal Aviation Administration's list of approved special light-sport aircraft on 20 August 2019.

== Reactions ==
Reviewer Marino Boric described the design in a 2015 review as "stylish" and "elegant".

== Accidents and incidents ==
- On 26 June 2026, a Sunward SA 60L Aurora, registry B-12PP, owned by a local general aviation company crashed into the China Zun skyscraper in Beijing, China. It was reported that the pilot died and that 13 people sustained injuries.

== Variants ==
SA 60L
Original model
SA 60V
Upgraded model with engine installation improvements and IFR instrumentation

== Specifications (SA 60L Aurora) ==
Data from Bayerl, Tacke and manufacturer

General characteristics

- Crew: one
- Capacity: one passenger
- Length: 6.9 m (22 ft 8 in)
- Wingspan: 8.6 m (28 ft 3 in)
- Height: 2.5 m (8 ft 2 in)
- Wing area: 11.8 m^{2} (127 sq ft)
- Empty weight: 340 kg (750 lb)
- Gross weight: 600 kg (1,323 lb)
- Fuel capacity: 120 L (26 imp gal; 32 US gal)
- Powerplant: 1 × Rotax 912ULS four cylinder, liquid and air-cooled, four stroke aircraft engine, 75 kW (101 hp)

Performance

- Cruise speed: 220 km/h (140 mph, 120 kn)
- Stall speed: 73 km/h (45 mph, 39 kn)
- Never exceed speed: 270 km/h (170 mph, 150 kn)
- Range: 1,200 km (750 mi, 650 nmi)
- Service ceiling: 4,000 m (13,000 ft)
- Rate of climb: 5.5 m/s (1,080 ft/min)
- Wing loading: 50.8 kg/m^{2} (10.4 lb/sq ft)

Avionics

- Garmin Aero500
