= Fly Synthesis Texan =

Italian ultralight aircraft

Texan
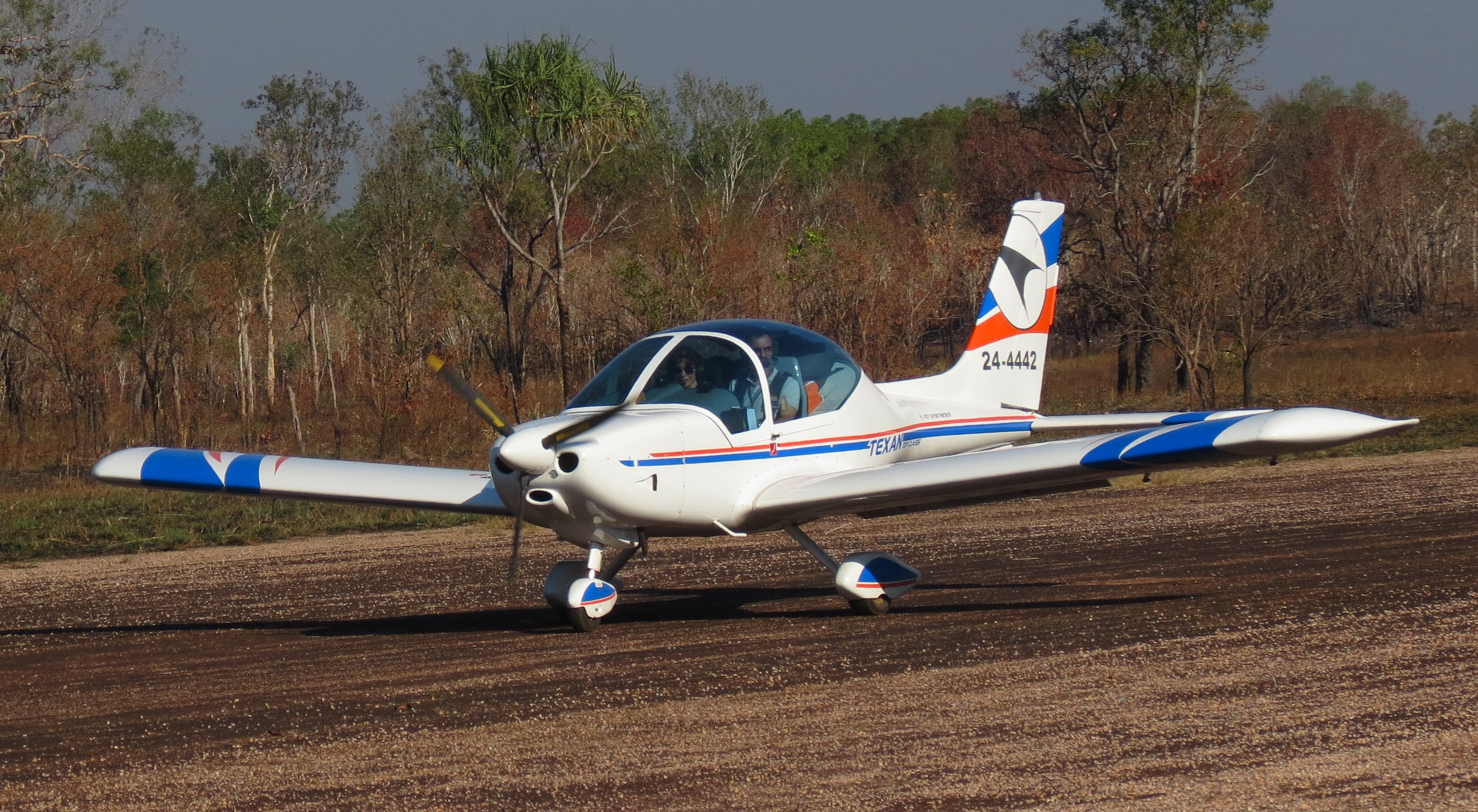

General information
- Type: Ultralight aircraft and Light-sport aircraft
- National origin: Italy
- Manufacturer: Gryphen Aircraft
- Status: In production

History
- Manufactured: 1999-present
- Introduction date: 1999

The Texan is an Italian ultralight and light-sport aircraft, designed and now produced by Gryphen Aircraft Industries Srl (ex- Fly Synthesis) and which has been in production since 1999. The aircraft is supplied as a complete ready-to-fly-aircraft.

== Design and development ==
The aircraft was designed to comply with the Fédération Aéronautique Internationale microlight rules and US light-sport aircraft rules. It features a cantilever low-wing, a two-seats-in-side-by-side configuration enclosed cockpit under a bubble canopy, fixed or retractable tricycle landing gear and a single engine in tractor configuration.

The aircraft is made from carbon fibre. Its 8.60 m (28.2 ft) span wing has an area of 11.80 m^{2} (127.0 sq ft) and flaps. Standard engines available are the 60 kW (80 hp) Rotax 912UL, the 75 kW (100 hp) Rotax 912ULS and the 63 kW (85 hp) Jabiru 2200 four-stroke powerplants.

In 2022 a new version of the TEXAN was introduced, with retractable gear and Rotax 915 engine, producing 105 kW (141 hp)

== Operational history ==
On 23 November 2013, six Texans broke the Guinness world record for the lowest flying formation by flying at 422 m (1,385 ft) below sea level at the Dead Sea in Israel.

== Variants ==
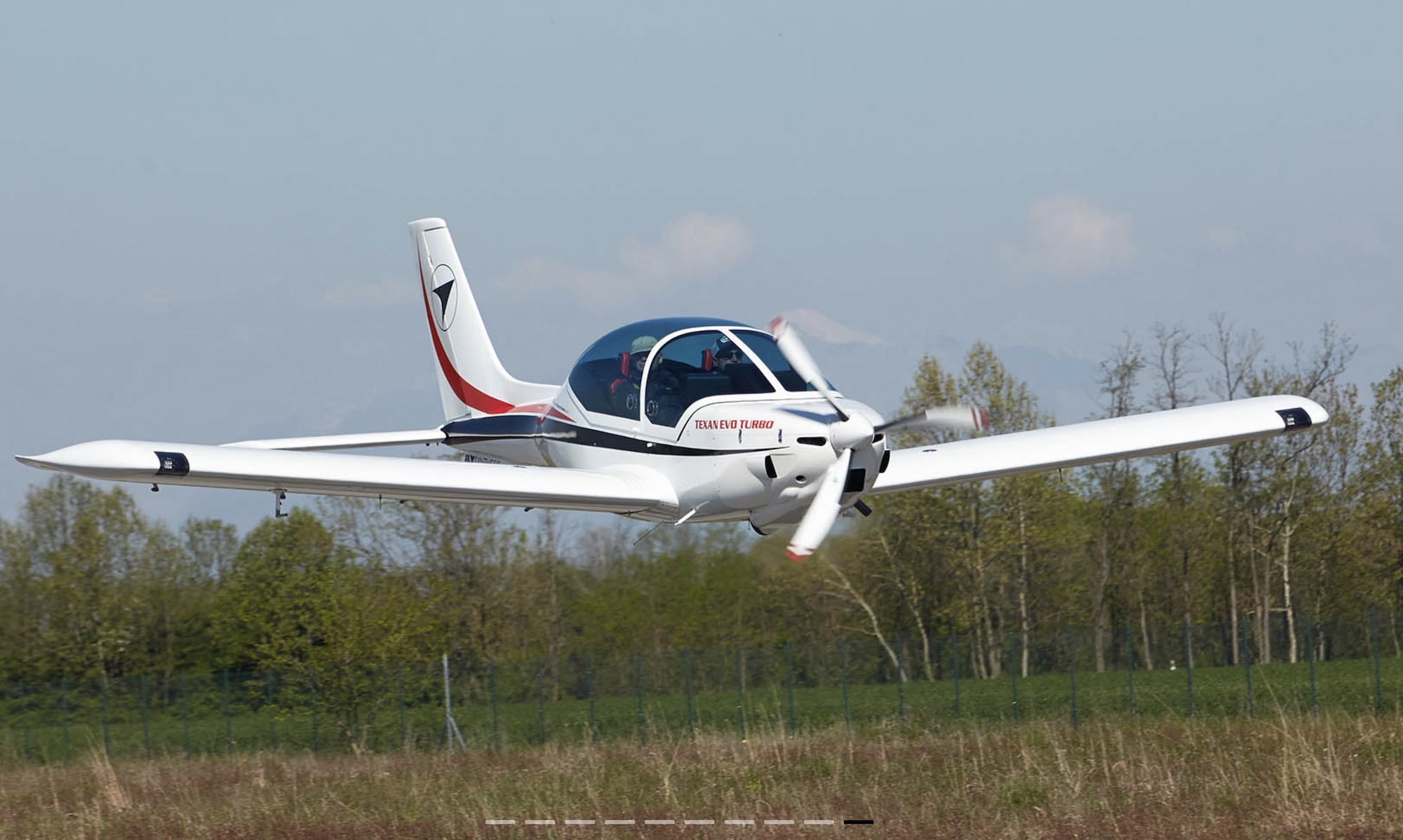
Texan GTR 915

Texan 600
Version with a gross weight of 600 kg (1,323 lb) and with fixed landing gear, for the United States light-sport aircraft class. Known as the Lafayette Texan in the US.
Texan Top Class
Version with a gross weight of 472.5 kg (1,042 lb) and with fixed landing gear, for the European microlight aircraft class.
Texan Club
Version of the Texan Top Class with a gross weight of 472.5 kg (1,042 lb), with fixed landing gear and equipped with an 60 kW (80 hp) Rotax 912UL engine for the European microlight aircraft class.
Texan RG
Version of the Texan Top Class with a gross weight of 600 kg (1,323 lb) and retractable landing gear for the European microlight aircraft class.

== Specifications (the new - Texan GTR 915) ==
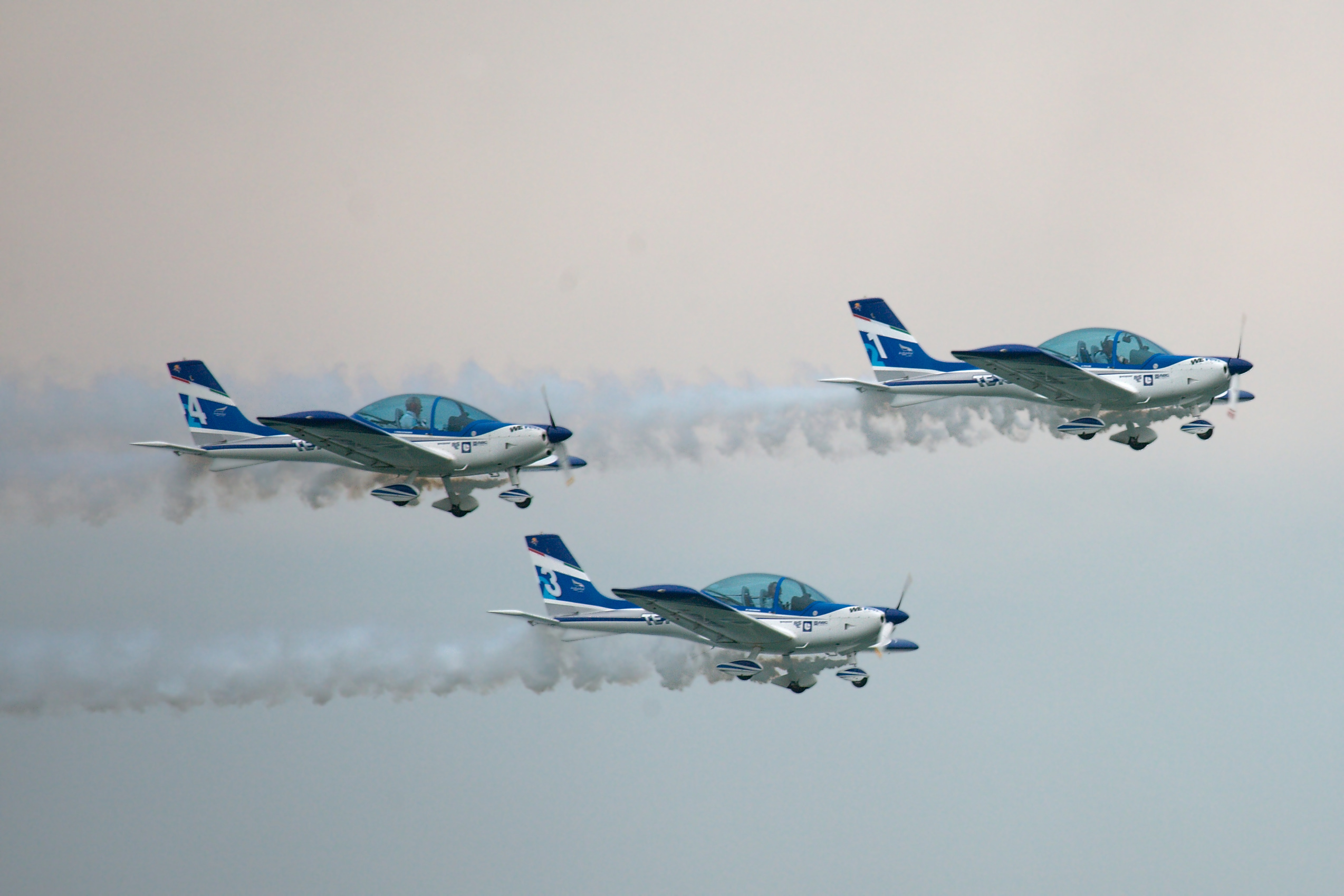
Texans flown by the WeFly! Team in 2009

Data from Bayerl

General characteristics

- Crew: one
- Capacity: one passenger
- Length: 6.99 m (22 ft 11 in)
- Wingspan: 8.60 m (28 ft 3 in)
- Height: 2.40 m (7 ft 10 in)
- Wing area: 11.80 m^{2} (127.0 sq ft)
- Empty weight: 380 kg (838 lb)
- Gross weight: 600 kg (1,323 lb)
- Fuel capacity: 130 L (29 imp gal; 34 US gal) in two 65 L (14 imp gal; 17 US gal) tanks
- Powerplant: 1 × Rotax 915 iS four cylinder, liquid and air-cooled, four stroke aircraft engine, 107 kW (143 hp)
- Propellers: 3-bladed Woodcomp

Performance

- Maximum speed: 289 km/h (180 mph, 156 kn)
- Cruise speed: 225 km/h (140 mph, 121 kn)
- Stall speed: 64 km/h (40 mph, 35 kn)
- Range: 1,300 km (810 mi, 700 nmi)
- g limits: +4/-2
- Rate of climb: 7 m/s (1,400 ft/min)
- Wing loading: 40.04 kg/m^{2} (8.20 lb/sq ft)

== See also ==
Similar aircraft

- Sunward Aurora
