= WeFly! Team =

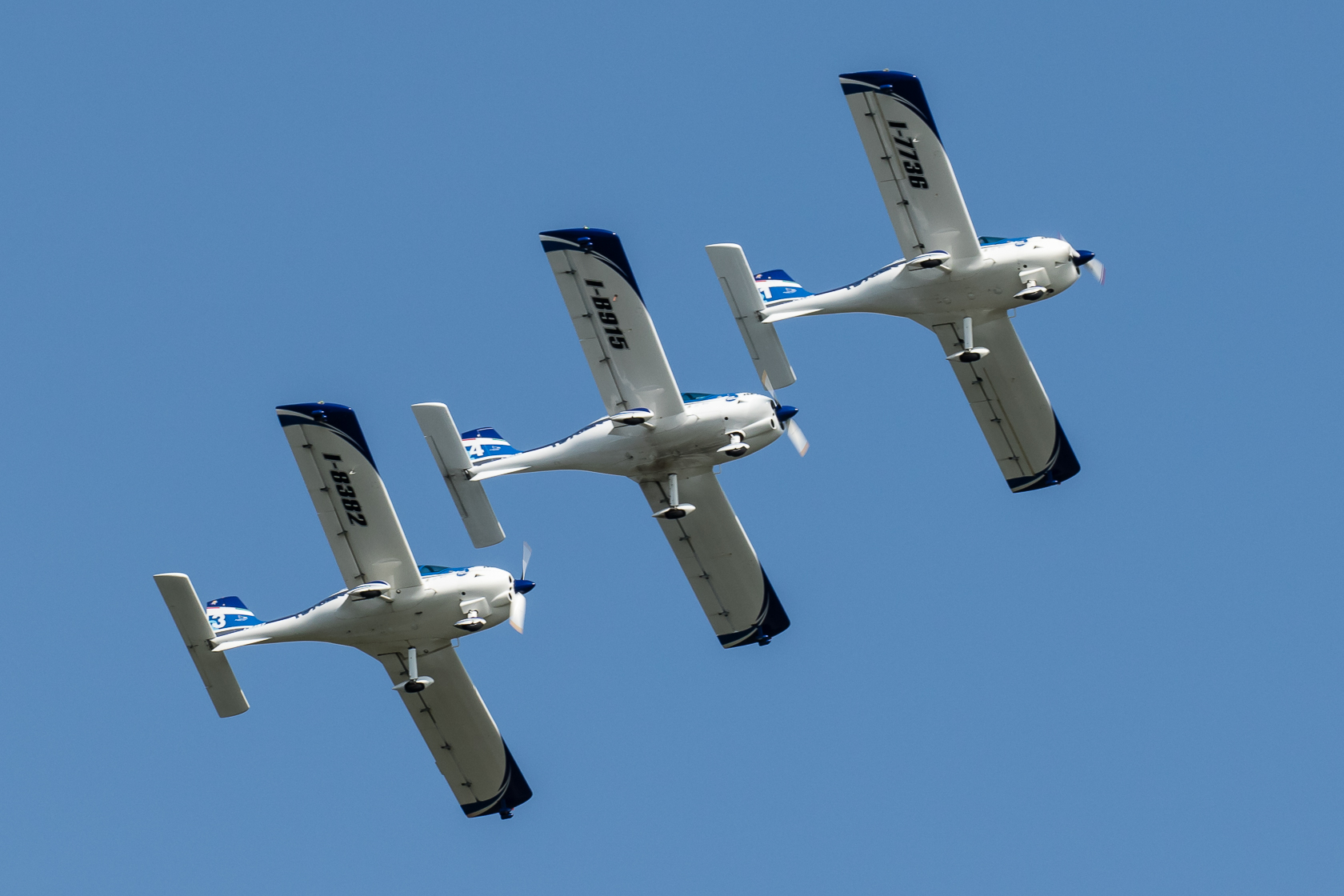
- Active: 2007–present
- Country: Italy
- Type: Civilian aerobatic display team
- Garrison/HQ: Aviosuperficie di Caposile - Jesolo Italy
- Website: Official website

Aircraft flown
- Trainer: Van´s Aircraft RV-7

The WeFly! Team is a civilian aerobatic team from Italy. The team is funded by sponsors and patrons. Two of the three pilots have a physical disability.

== History ==
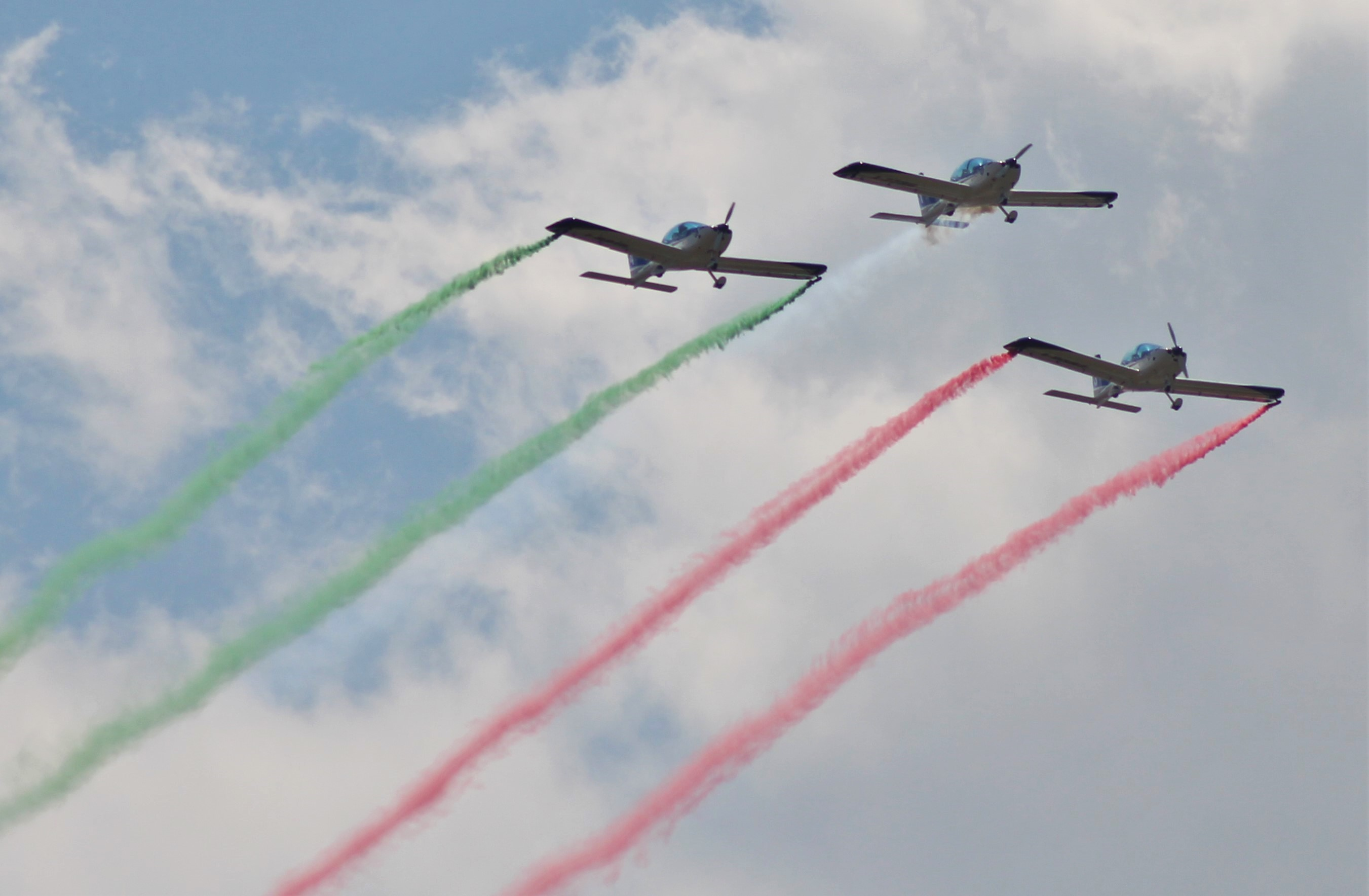
The WeFly! Team use smoke to represent the Tricolore Italiano

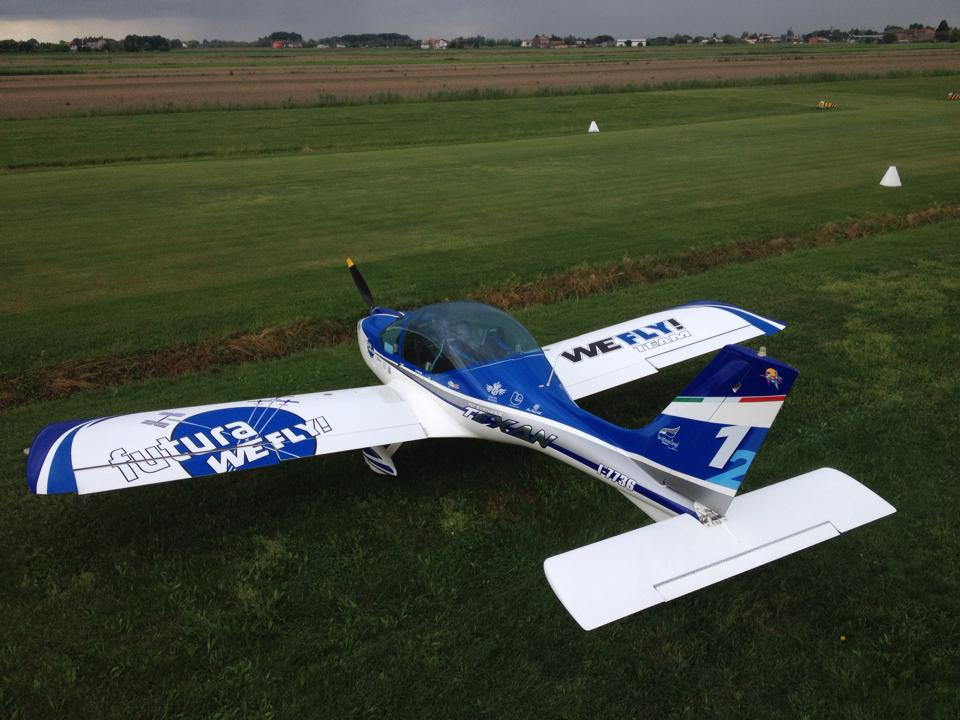
Fly Synthesis Texan Top Class of the WeFly! Team

The team was founded in 2007 with the home base Aviosuperficie di Caposile - Jesolo. On April 24, 2008, the team received its new Texan 2.0 aircraft. In 2021 the team switched to Vans RV-7 aircraft.

== Accidents and incidents ==
On July 22, 2008, one of the aircraft had a fatal crash during a display, In memory of the pilot the display number 2 has not been used again.

== Disability Awareness ==
During the "Futura" space mission, the Italian astronaut Samantha Cristoforetti, took with her a flag "WeFly! Futura ... dared to fly". The flag was designed for the occasion by the aircraft designer Mirco Pecorari, to send a message to all humanity against stereotypes and prejudices against disabled people. It testifies to the strength, the courage and the determination of these pilots. After 200 days in space the flag was returned to the team base at Aviosuperficie di Caposile.
