= Wallaby (ferry) =

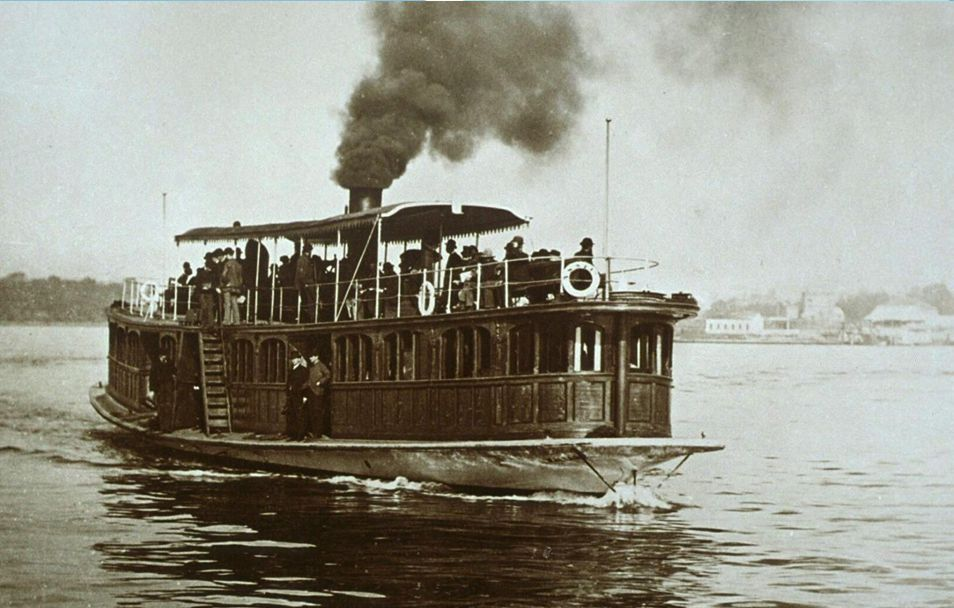
- Wallaby in her original appearance

History
- Name: Wallaby
- Operator: North Shore Ferry Company; Sydney Ferries Limited
- Builder: W. Dunn, Berrys Bay
- Cost: £4,834
- Launched: 1879
- Out of service: 1918
- Fate: Broken up, 1926

General characteristics
- Tonnage: 163 tonnes
- Length: 33.1 m
- Beam: 5.6 m
- Speed: 10 knots
- Capacity: 305

Wallaby was a ferry that operated on Sydney Harbour.

Built in 1879 for the North Shore Ferry Company, she was Sydney's first double-ended screw ferry. This would become the standard model for almost all Sydney ferries until the late 20th century, a fleet that would become for a time the biggest in the world.

Wallaby was converted to a tug in 1918, and later to a lighter. She was broken up in 1926.

== Background ==
The North Shore Steam Ferry Company (Sydney Ferries Limited from 1900) began a regular scheduled ferry service from 1878 to Mosman as housing development in the area began to grow. Ferry transport was the only feasible way across the harbour at a time when roads were poor and there no bridge connection (the Sydney Harbour Bridge was opened in 1932).

== Design and construction ==
Designed by civil engineer and naval architect, Norman Selfe, Wallaby was the world's second double-ended screw ferry. The North Shore Ferry Company's order for Wallaby was first, however, a Liverpool to Birkenhead ferry in England was the first double-ended screw ferry delivered into service.

Wallaby was built by W. Dunn of Berrys Bay for £4,834. Her 35 hp compound steam engine was built by Mort's Dock & Engineering Company and could push her to 10 knots. She was the first Sydney ferry to have half-wheel and chains, a steering system used on Sydney ferry steamers for almost another fifty years. Enclosed wheelhouses were added later.

The 33.1 m long Wallaby could carry up to 305 passengers. Unusually, Wallaby's lower deck superstructure extended the full width of the hull to the inner sponsons. Thus, with no bulwarks there was no outside passenger area or seating on this level. It was the first ferry to have glazing across the whole lower deck. Previously, ferries had a glazed saloon only at one end for ladies, while the other end was only equipped with curtains which could be unrolled in bad weather. In choppy conditions, her low freeboard often allowed water to flow across the main deck.

Double-ended ferries did not need to turn around at the ports, making maneuvering easier and the transfer of cargo and passengers much faster. This was particularly useful at the increasingly busy main terminus of Circular Quay in Sydney Cove. Sydney already had a number double-ended paddle steamers, however, the double-ended screw ferry was a more difficult undertaking.

It is thought that she may have been meant to be called "Willoughby", and at the launch, the ship's sponsor mispronounced the name as "Wallaby".

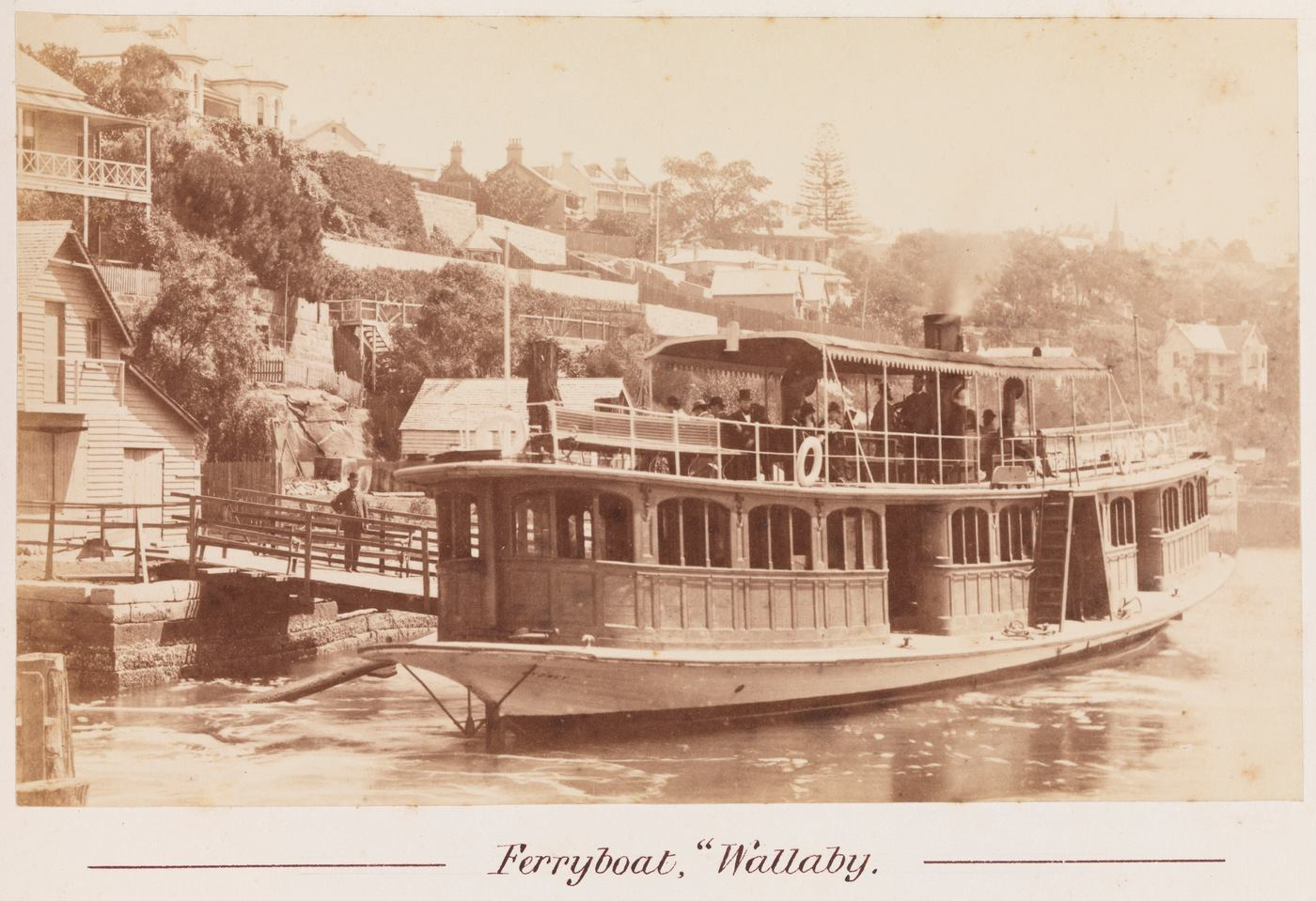
With her original open wheelhouses. Likely to be berthing at Lavender Bay

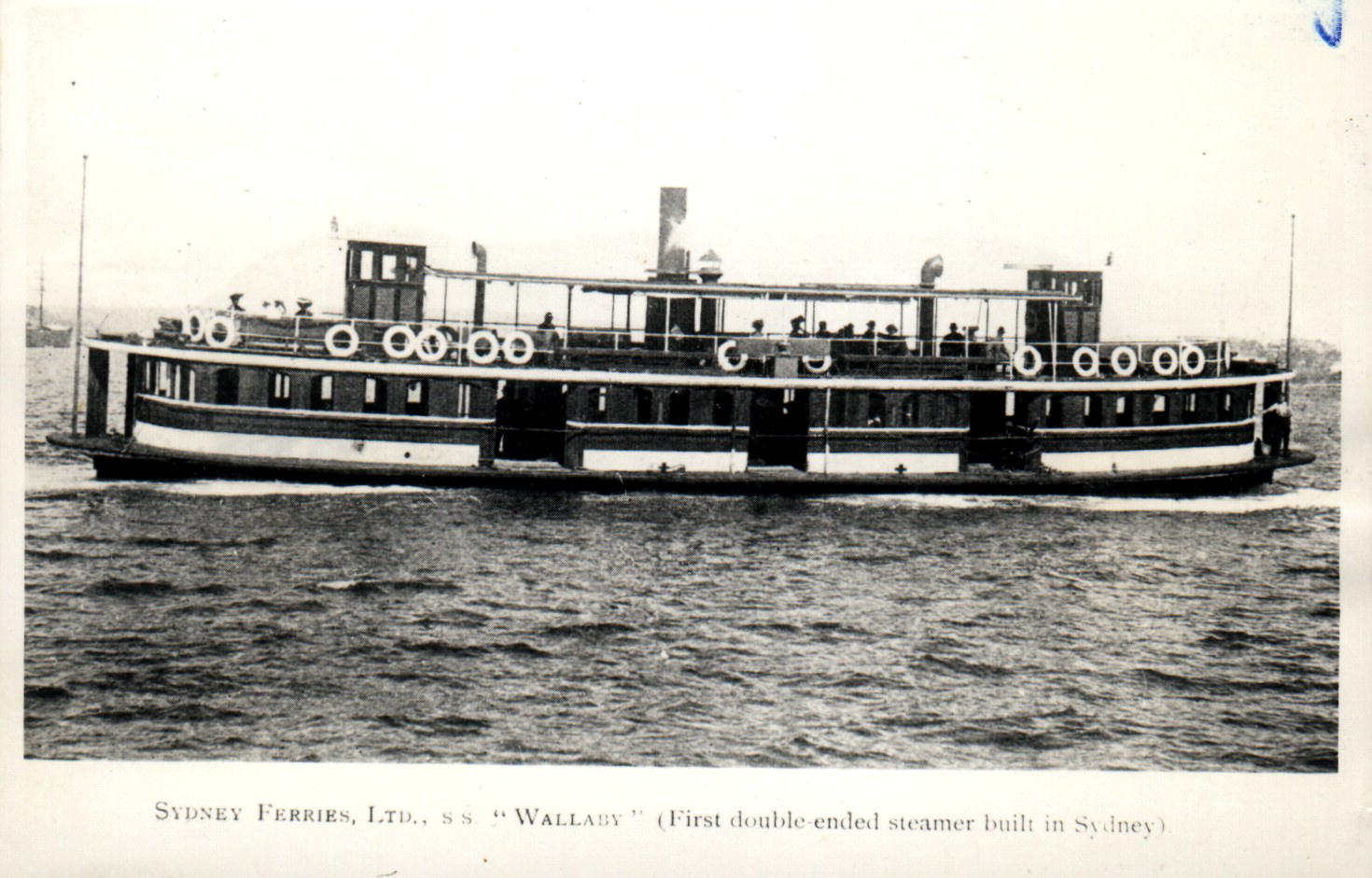
Shown after her wheelhouses closed in.

== Service history ==
Wallaby was not an immediate success, and the North Shore Steam Ferry Company continued to build paddle steamers through to 1885. However, over time, screw propulsion on double-ended ferries was perfected by designers such as Walter Reeks. The model became the norm for the fleet which became the largest during the booming early twentieth century before the opening of the Sydney Harbour Bridge.

Wallaby was converted to a tug in 1918, and later to a lighter. She was broken up in 1926.

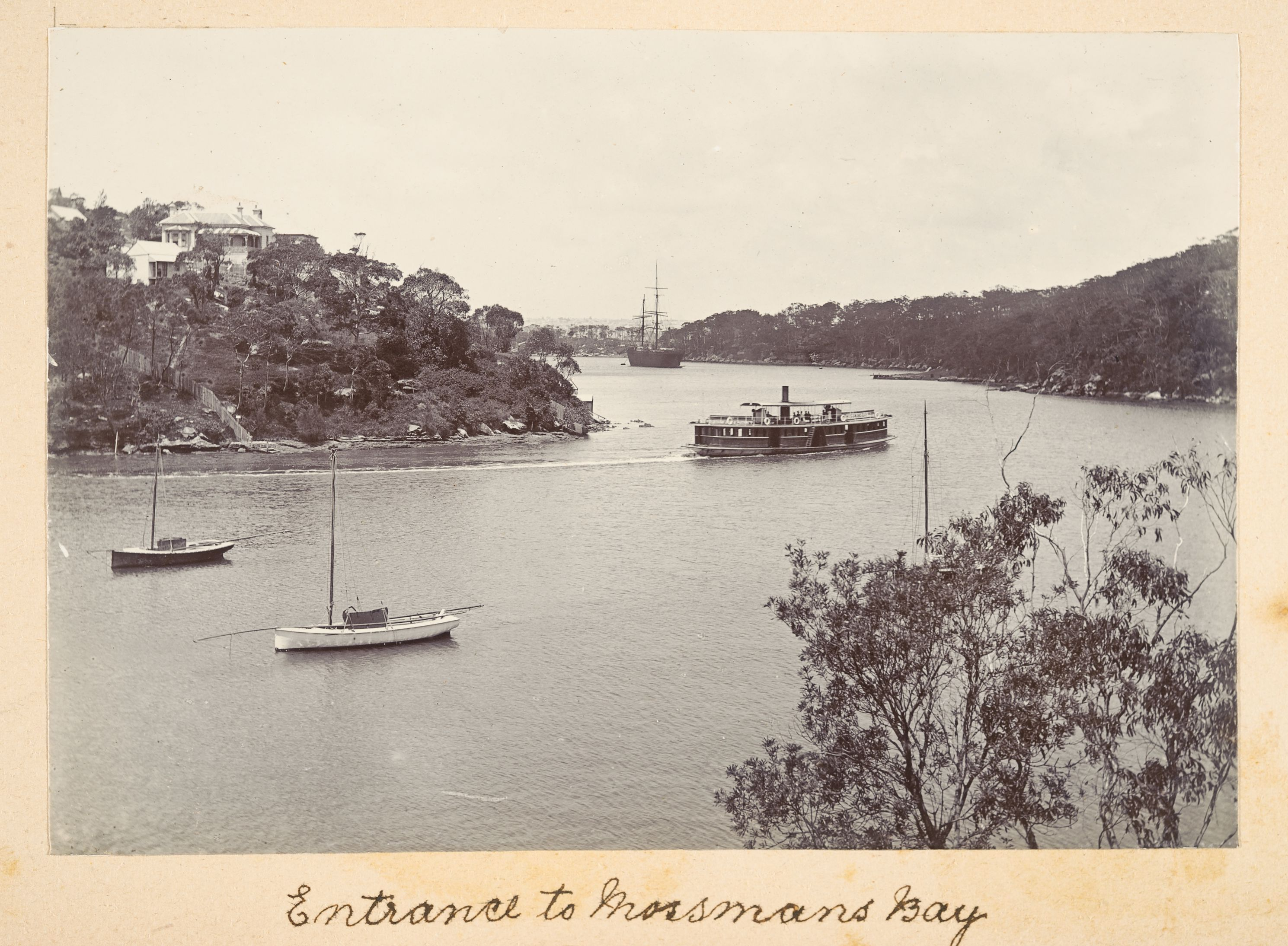
In Mosman Bay between 1879 and 1900

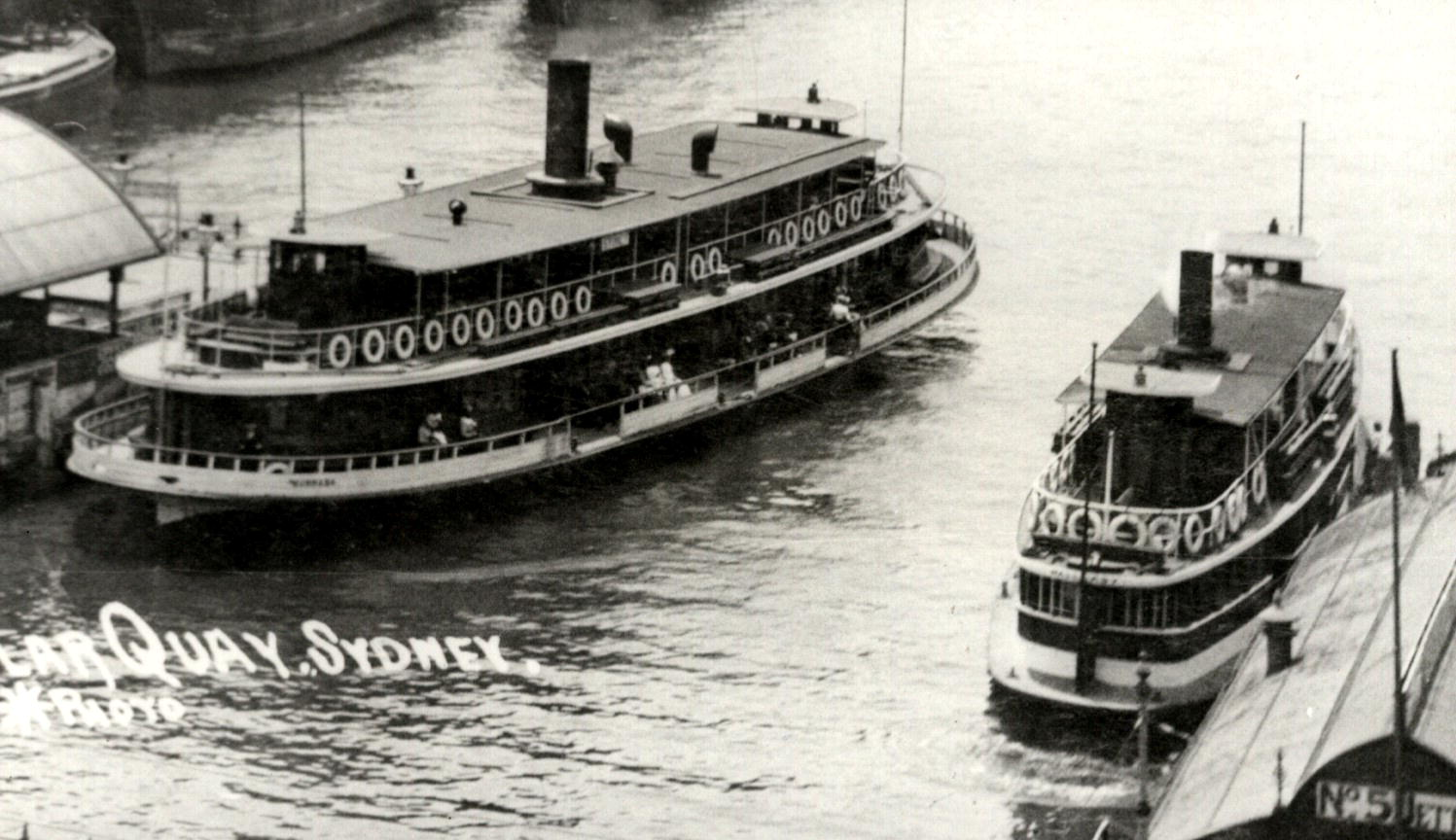
Alongside Kurraba (built 1899), one of the first K-class, for which Wallaby was archetypical, at Circular Quay

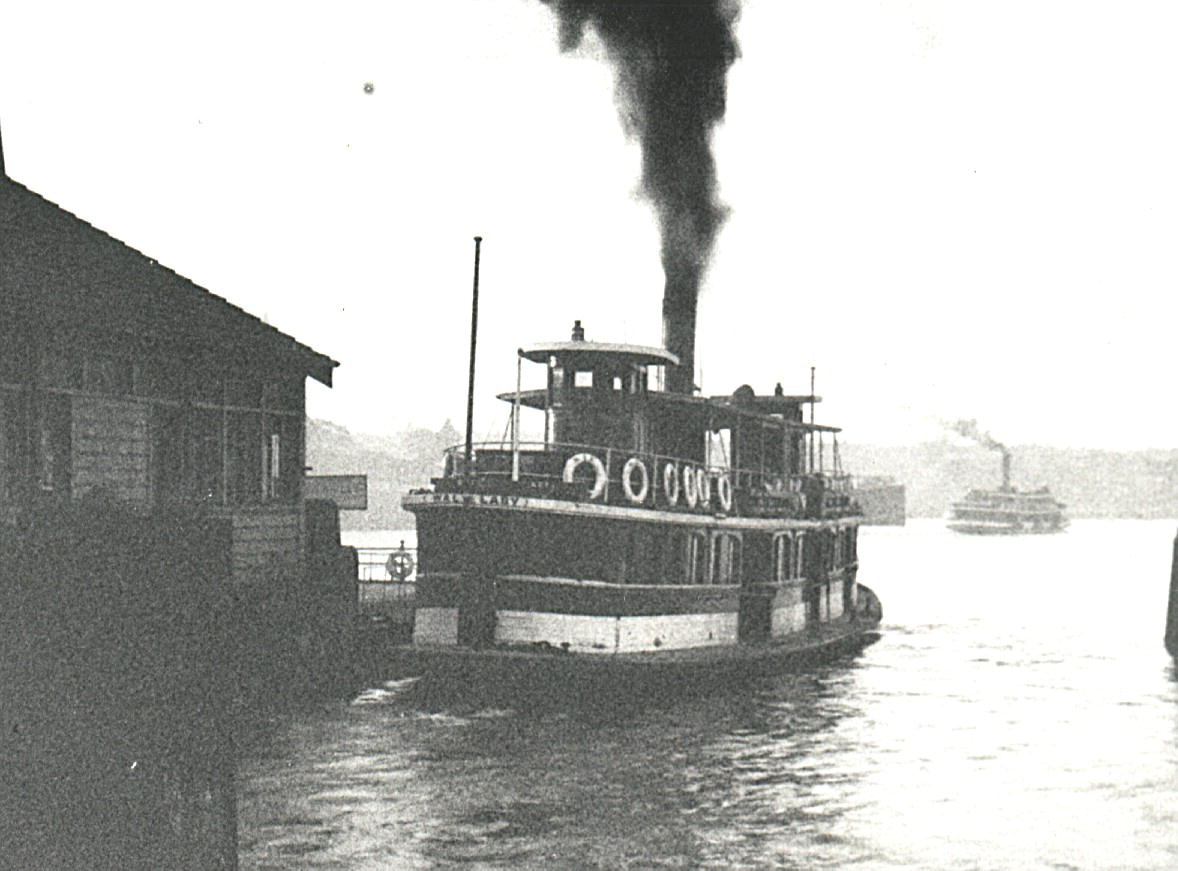
Leaving Circular Quay with enclosed wheelhouses

== See also ==
- List of Sydney Harbour ferries
- Timeline of Sydney Harbour ferries
