= Fly Synthesis Storch =

Italian ultralight aircraft

Storch
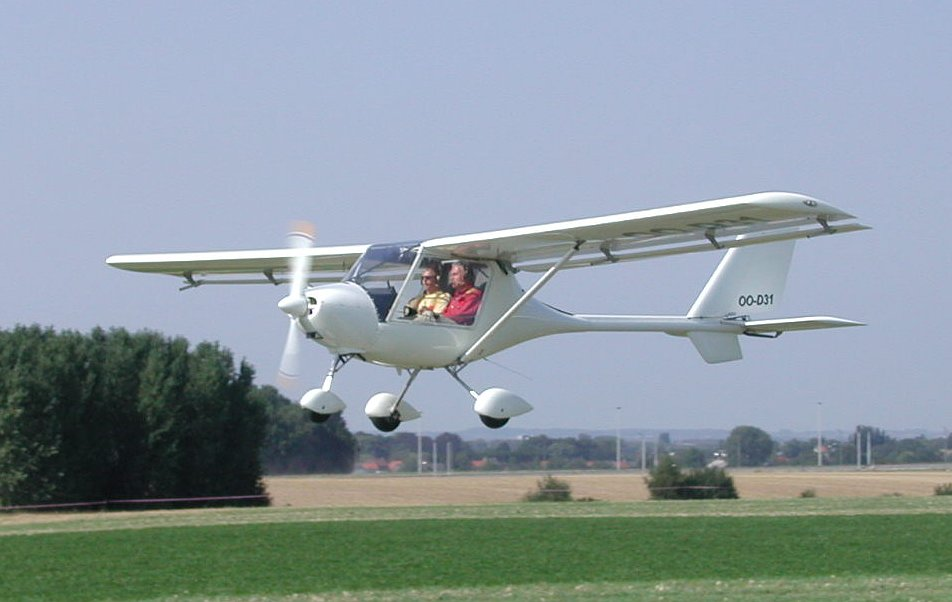

General information
- Type: Ultralight aircraft
- National origin: Italy
- Manufacturer: Gryphen Aircraft
- Status: In production
- Number built: 150 (1998)

History
- Introduction date: 1990

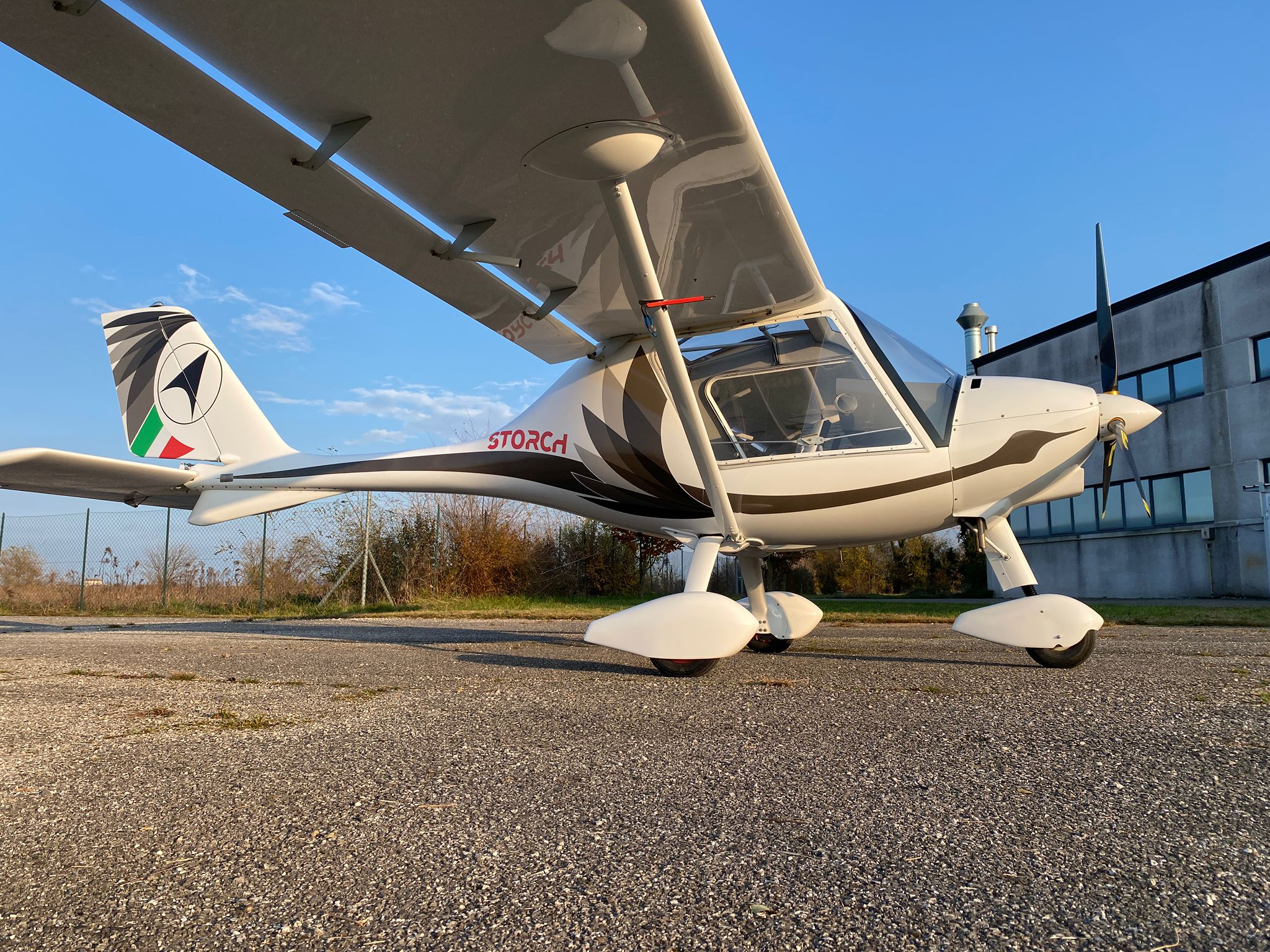
the NEW STORCH

The Fly Synthesis Storch (English: Stork) is an Italian ultralight aircraft, designed and today produced by Gryphen Aircraft Industries (ex- Fly Synthesis), introduced in 1990. The aircraft is supplied as a complete ready-to-fly-aircraft or as a kit for amateur construction.

== Design and development ==
The Storch was designed to comply with the Fédération Aéronautique Internationale microlight rules. It features a strut-braced high-wing, a two-seats-in-side-by-side configuration enclosed cockpit, fixed tricycle landing gear and a single engine in tractor configuration.

The aircraft is of mixed construction, with the fuselage made from composites and the tail boom an aluminum tube. The HS model has a 8.70 m (28.5 ft) span wing with an area of 11.8 m^{2} (127 sq ft) and flaperons. Standard engines available are the 80 hp (60 kW) Rotax 912UL and the 85 hp (63 kW) Jabiru 2200 four-stroke powerplants. All controls are operated by teleflex cables, except the ailerons, which are operated by push-pull tubes.

In 2024 a new version of the Storch was released, with a full composite fuselage, enhancing the aircraft performance significantly.

== Variants ==
Storch CL
Model with a longer 10.15 m (33.3 ft) span wing with an area of 13.6 m^{2} (146 sq ft) and a gross weight of 450 kg (992.1 lb), sold as the Lafayette Stork Classic in the USA.
Storch HS
Model with a shorter 8.70 m (28.5 ft) span wing with an area of 11.8 m^{2} (127 sq ft) and Junkers-style flaperons. Gross weight of 472.5 kg (1,041.7 lb) It is sold as the Lafayette Stork Super Sport in the USA.
Storch S
Model with separate flaps and ailerons, in place of flaperons and a gross weight of 500 kg (1,102.3 lb).

== Specifications (New STORCH) ==
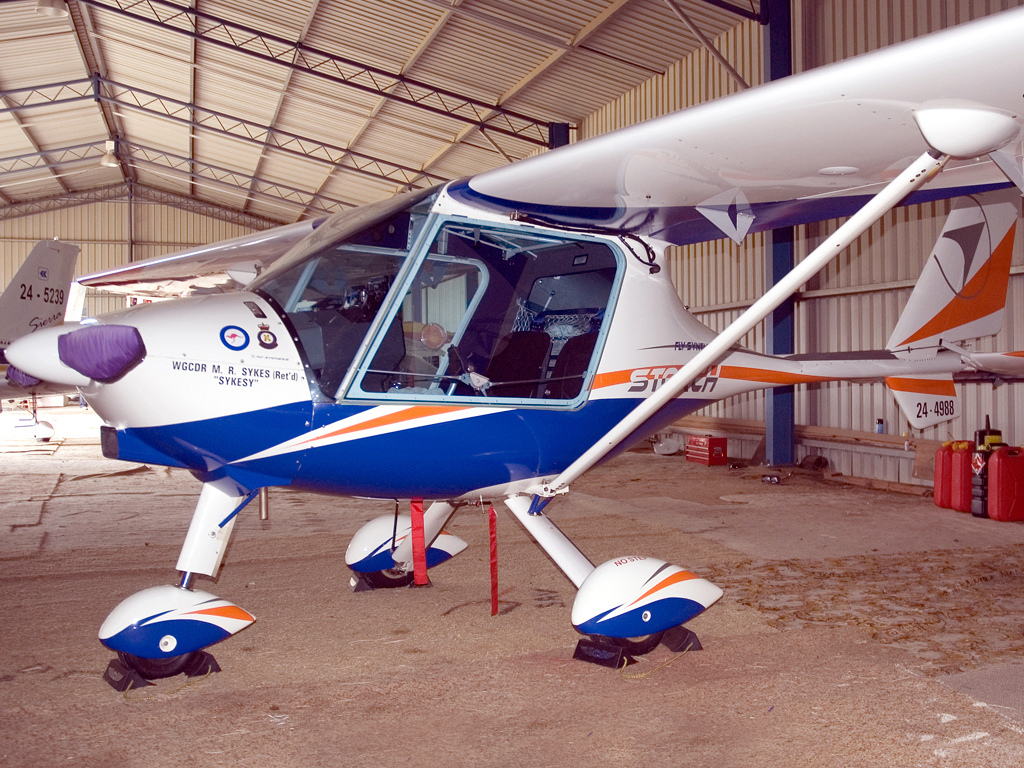
Fly Synthesis Storch S

Data from Bayerl and Fly Synthesis

General characteristics

- Crew: one
- Capacity: one passenger
- Length: 5.75 m (18 ft 10 in)
- Wingspan: 8.70 m (28 ft 7 in)
- Height: 2.45 m (8 ft 0 in)
- Wing area: 11.7 m^{2} (126 sq ft)
- Empty weight: 320 kg (705 lb)
- Gross weight: 600 kg (1,323 lb)
- Fuel capacity: 100 litres (22 imp gal; 26 US gal) in two 50 litres (11 imp gal; 13 US gal) tanks
- Powerplant: 1 × Rotax 912ULS four cylinder, liquid and air-cooled, four stroke aircraft engine, 75 kW (100 hp)

Performance

- Maximum speed: 240 km/h (150 mph, 130 kn)
- Cruise speed: 200 km/h (120 mph, 110 kn)
- Stall speed: 64 km/h (40 mph, 35 kn)
- g limits: +4/-2
- Rate of climb: 5.0 m/s (980 ft/min)
