= Graffiti (disambiguation) =

Graffiti is any writing or drawings scribbled, scratched, or sprayed on a wall or other surface in a public place.

Graffiti may also refer to:

== Books and publications ==
- Graffiti, a series of books by author Nigel Rees
- Graffiti (magazine), a Canadian music magazine in the 1980s
- Graffiti (newspaper), an arts and entertainment publication in West Virginia

== Music ==
=== Albums ===
- Graffiti (Tokio album), 1998
- Graffiti (Chris Brown album), 2009
- Graffiti Bridge (album), a 1990 Prince album

=== Songs ===
- "Graffiti" (Maxïmo Park song), 2005
- "Graffiti" (Gackt song), 2011
- "Graffiti", Spanish version of hit single from Demis Roussos discography

== Aviation ==
- FUL MA 30 Graffiti, a German ultralight trike design
- Raisner Graffiti, an American ultralight trike design

== Computing and technology ==
- Graffiti (Palm OS), a handwriting recognition software used in PDAs
- Graffiti (program), a computer program used in the fields of mathematics and chemistry
- Graffiti Markup Language, a format that stores graffiti motion data
- Yahoo! Graffiti, a multiplayer word game on Yahoo! Games

== Other uses ==
- Graffiti Junktion, a chain of restaurants located throughout Florida
- Moviment Graffitti, a Maltese leftist pressure group
- Graffiti Awards, Uruguayan music awards established in 2003
- Graffiti Bridge (film), a 1990 film starring Prince

== See also ==
- Grafite (born 1979), Brazilian footballer
- Graffito (disambiguation)
- Modesto American Graffiti Festival, a classic car show in Modesto, California.
