= Early Bird Aircraft Company =

American aircraft manufacturer

- Company type: Privately held company
- Industry: Aerospace
- Fate: Out of business
- Headquarters: Erie, Colorado, United States
- Products: Kit aircraft, aircraft plans

The Early Bird Aircraft Company was an American aircraft manufacturer based in Erie, Colorado. The company specialized in the design and manufacture of historical replica aircraft, sold as both kits or as just printed plans for amateur construction. The company's designs were marketed for a time by Leading Edge Air Foils.

The company produced two designs. The Early Bird Spad 13 is an 80% scale replica of the First World War SPAD S.XIII fighter. The Early Bird Jenny is a 67% scale replica of the First World War Curtiss JN-4 Jenny trainer. Both aircraft are constructed from a mix of steel and aluminum tubing, with some wooden parts and with flying surfaces covered in doped aircraft fabric.

== Aircraft ==
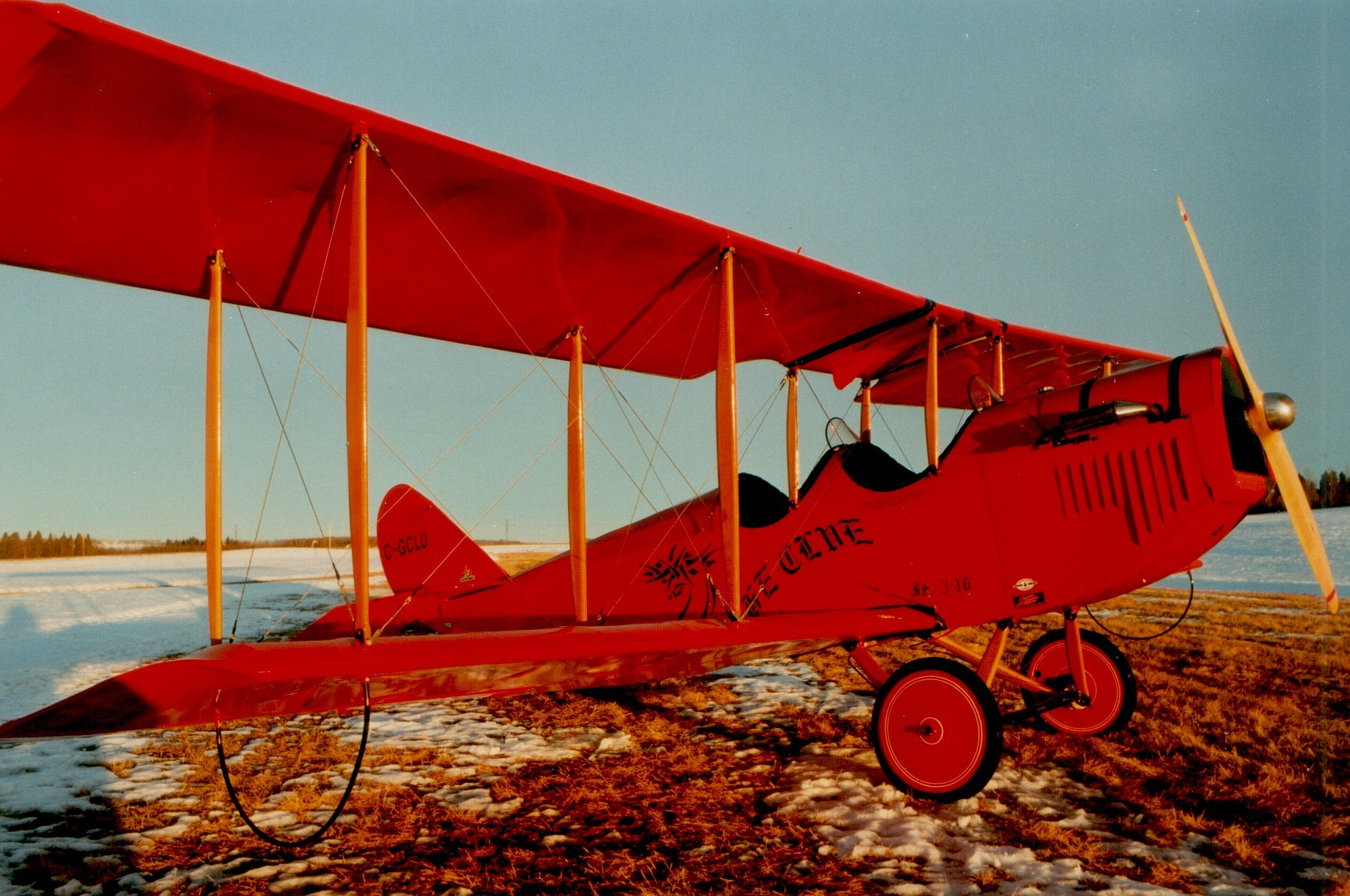
Early Bird Jenny

Summary of aircraft built by the Early Bird Aircraft Company
| Model name | First flight | Number built | Type |
|---|---|---|---|
| Early Bird Spad 13 | | at least one | Replica First World War fighter |
| Early Bird Jenny | | 24 | Replica First World War trainer |
