= Seawing =

Seawing may refer to:

- J & J Ultralights Seawing, an amphibious ultralight aircraft
- Sea Wing, an excursion vessel on Lake Pepin, Minnesota, in the Sea Wing disaster of 1890
- Seawing, a cruise ship formerly MS Southward
- Seawings, an seaplane operator in Dubai, UAE
- Seawing Airways, a seaplane operator at Rose Bay Water Airport, Sydney, Australia
- SeaWings, a fictional tribe in the Wings of Fire novel series
