= PA14 =

PA14 may refer to:

- Pennsylvania Route 14
- Pennsylvania's 14th congressional district
- Piper PA-14 Family Cruiser light aircraft
