= J & J Ultralights =

American aircraft manufacturer

- Company type: Privately held company
- Industry: Aerospace
- Founded: 1980s
- Fate: Out of business before 2005
- Headquarters: Live Oak, Florida, United States
- Key people: Owners: Roger and Ronavin Johnston
- Products: Ultralight trikes

J & J Ultralights was an American aircraft manufacturer that was based at Wings ’N Sunset Airport in Live Oak, Florida. The company specialized in the design and manufacture of ultralight trikes, including amphibious models. J & J Ultralights first produced aircraft in the 1980s, but was out of business before 2005. The company's designs were later produced by Leading Edge Air Foils and Kemmeries Aviation.

The company was founded by Roger and Ronavin Johnston. Operations encompassed aircraft design and manufacture, sales, support and flight training.

The company began producing the Tukan trike in the 1980s and in 1995 purchased the rights to the Seawing amphibious trike. By 2003 the company had 200 aircraft flying and another 150 kits under construction by customers.

== Aircraft ==
Aircraft built by J & J Ultralights
Model name	First flight	Number built	Type
J & J Ultralights Tukan	1980s	30 (February 2000)	ultralight trike
J & J Ultralights Seawing	1995	2 (February 2005)	amphibious ultralight trike
