= LEAF Trike =

American ultralight trike

Trike

General information
- Type: Ultralight trike
- National origin: United States
- Manufacturer: Leading Edge Air Foils
- Status: Production completed

The LEAF Trike is an American ultralight trike that was designed and produced by Leading Edge Air Foils in the 1980s. The aircraft was supplied as a kit for amateur construction.

== Design and development ==
The aircraft was designed to comply with the US FAR 103 Ultralight Vehicles rules, including the category's maximum empty weight of 254 lb (115 kg). The Trike has a standard empty weight of 149 lb (68 kg), plus the weight of the wing. It is a very minimalist design and features a cable-braced hang glider-style high-wing, weight-shift controls, a single-seat, open cockpit, tricycle landing gear and a single engine in pusher configuration.

The aircraft frame is made from bolted-together aluminum tubing, with its hang glider wing covered in Dacron sailcloth. The kit was supplied without a wing as any suitable hang glider wing can be used, provided it has adequate gross weight for the pilot and the carriage. The LEAF Talon 215 wing was recommended for the aircraft. The aircraft's gross weight and performance depends on the type of wing used.

The carriage design features a cable in place of the usual front tube, to allows easier folding for ground transportation. The landing gear uses 20 in (51 cm) main wheels and a steerable 16 in (41 cm) nose wheel. The powerplant was normally a Cuyuna UL-II-02 of 35 hp (26 kW) with a 2:1 reduction drive or optionally a Cuyuna 430 of 30 hp (22 kW).

The Trike was later replaced in the LEAF product line by the LEAF Tukan.

== Specifications (typical Trike) ==
Data from Cliche

General characteristics

- Crew: one
- Length: 7.4 ft (2.3 m)
- Height: 8.3 ft (2.5 m)
- Empty weight: 149 lb (68 kg) plus the weight of the selected wing
- Gross weight: 500 lb (227 kg) approximately
- Fuel capacity: 5 U.S. gallons (19 L; 4.2 imp gal)
- Powerplant: 1 × Cuyuna UL-II-02 twin cylinder, two-stroke aircraft engine, 35 hp (26 kW)

Performance

- Maximum speed: 45 mph (72 km/h, 39 kn)
- Cruise speed: 32 mph (51 km/h, 28 kn)
- Stall speed: 24 mph (39 km/h, 21 kn)
