= Wag-Aero CHUBy CUBy =

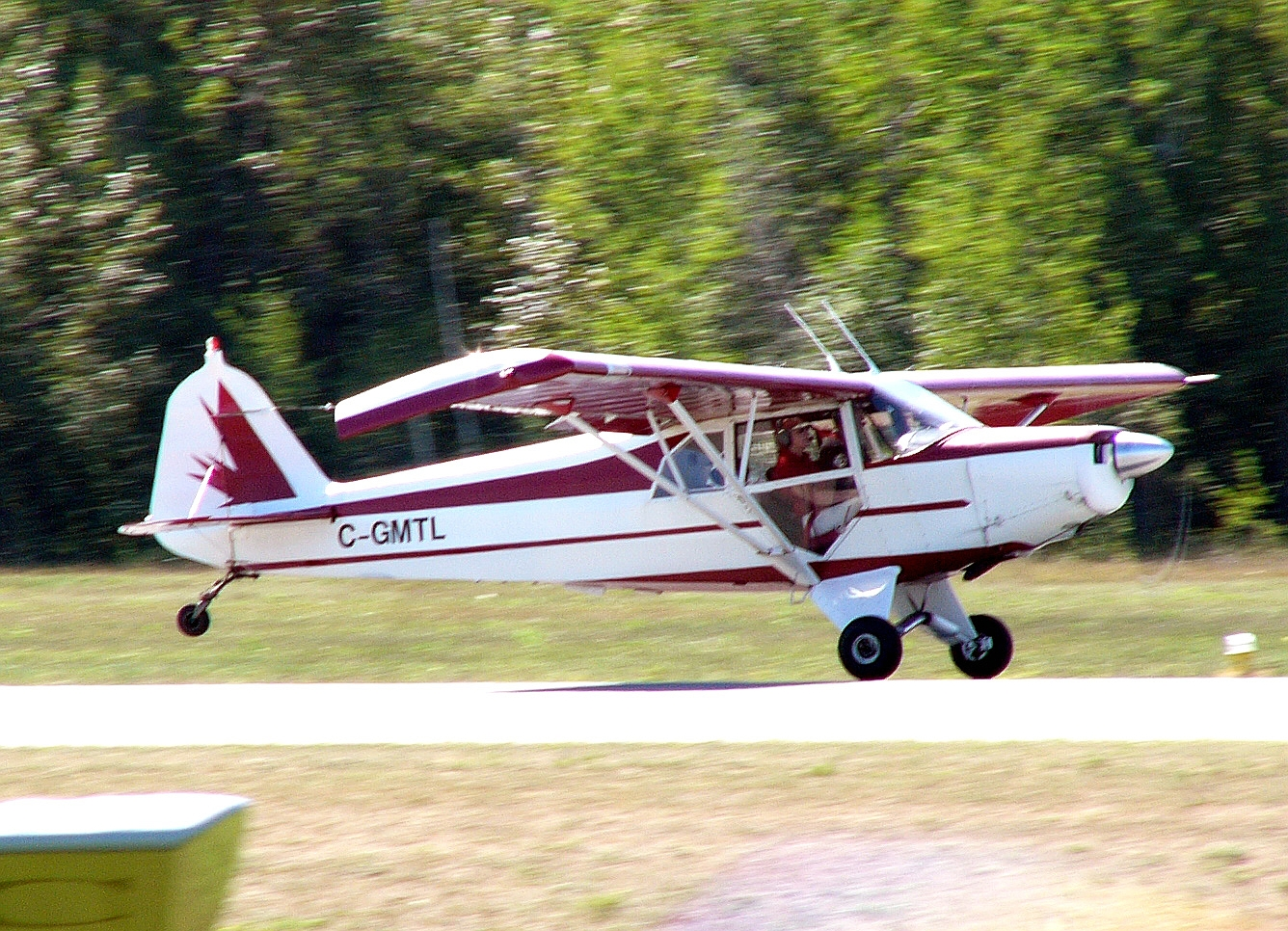
- Sportsman 2+2

General information
- Type: Homebuilt aircraft
- National origin: United States
- Manufacturer: Wag-Aero
- Designer: Dick Wagner, Tom Iverson
- Number built: 40 (December 2011)

History
- First flight: May 8, 1982
- Developed from: Wag-Aero Wag-a-Bond

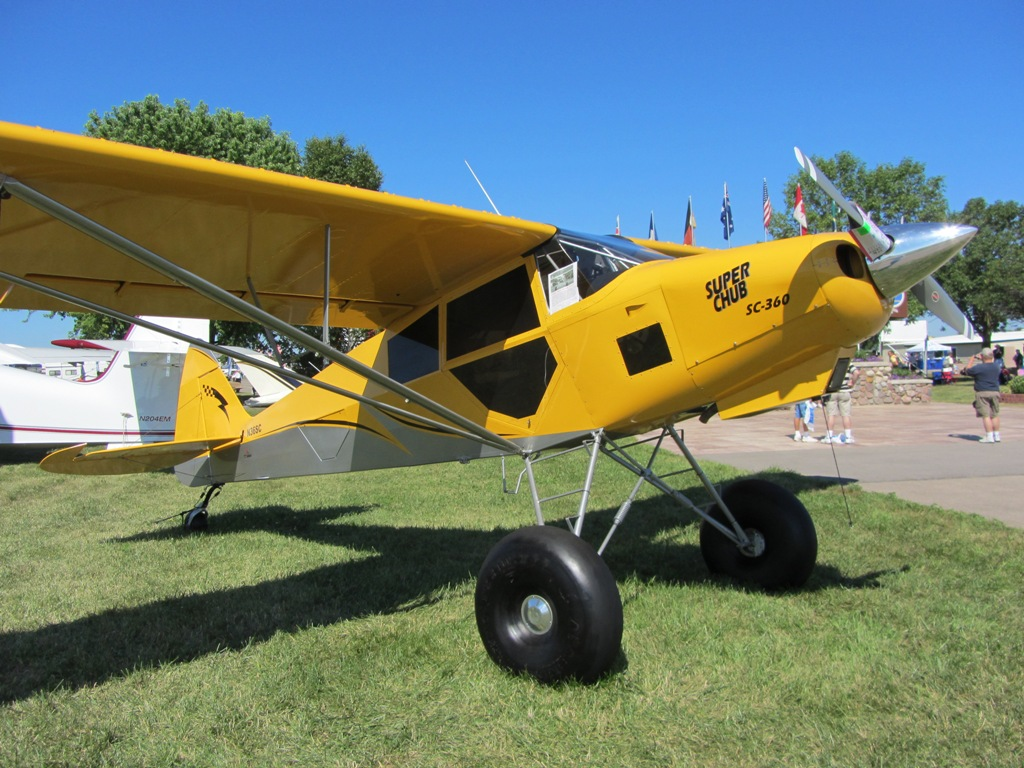
SC-360 Super Chub. A modified Wag-Aero Sportsman 2+2 with a Lycoming O-360 engine

The Wag-Aero CHUBy CUBy is a high-wing four-seat homebuilt cabin monoplane of tube-and-fabric construction, it is a modern representation of the Piper PA-14 taildragger with elements from other Piper family members. The plane is currently marketed as the Wag-Aero Sportsman 2+2 by Wag-Aero in kit form.

== Design and development ==
The CHUBy CUBy was the third homebuilt replica of a Piper product from parts supplier Wag-Aero. The PA-14 line was a popular aircraft for Alaska floatplane operations and the CHUBy CUBy was put to market to allow new examples to be built. The aircraft has an optional large opening to the baggage compartment similar to the Piper HE-1 ambulance style door.

The CHUBy CUBy closely resembles the Piper PA-14, but has several modifications. The recommended engine is the Lycoming O-320-E2D of 150 hp (112 kW) or Lycoming O-290 of 135 hp (101 kW) hung on a custom-designed swing-out engine mount. The CHUBy CUBy has swing-up doors on both sides of the cabin and two wing-mounted fuel tanks with a small header tank. The fuselage is welded from 4130 steel tubing rather than 1020 grade steel used in the original. The wings include spoilers to keep the aircraft on the ground and avoid floating.

Wag-Aero company president Dick Wagner flew the CHUBy CUBy for the first time on May 8, 1982.

== Specifications CHUBy CUBy ==
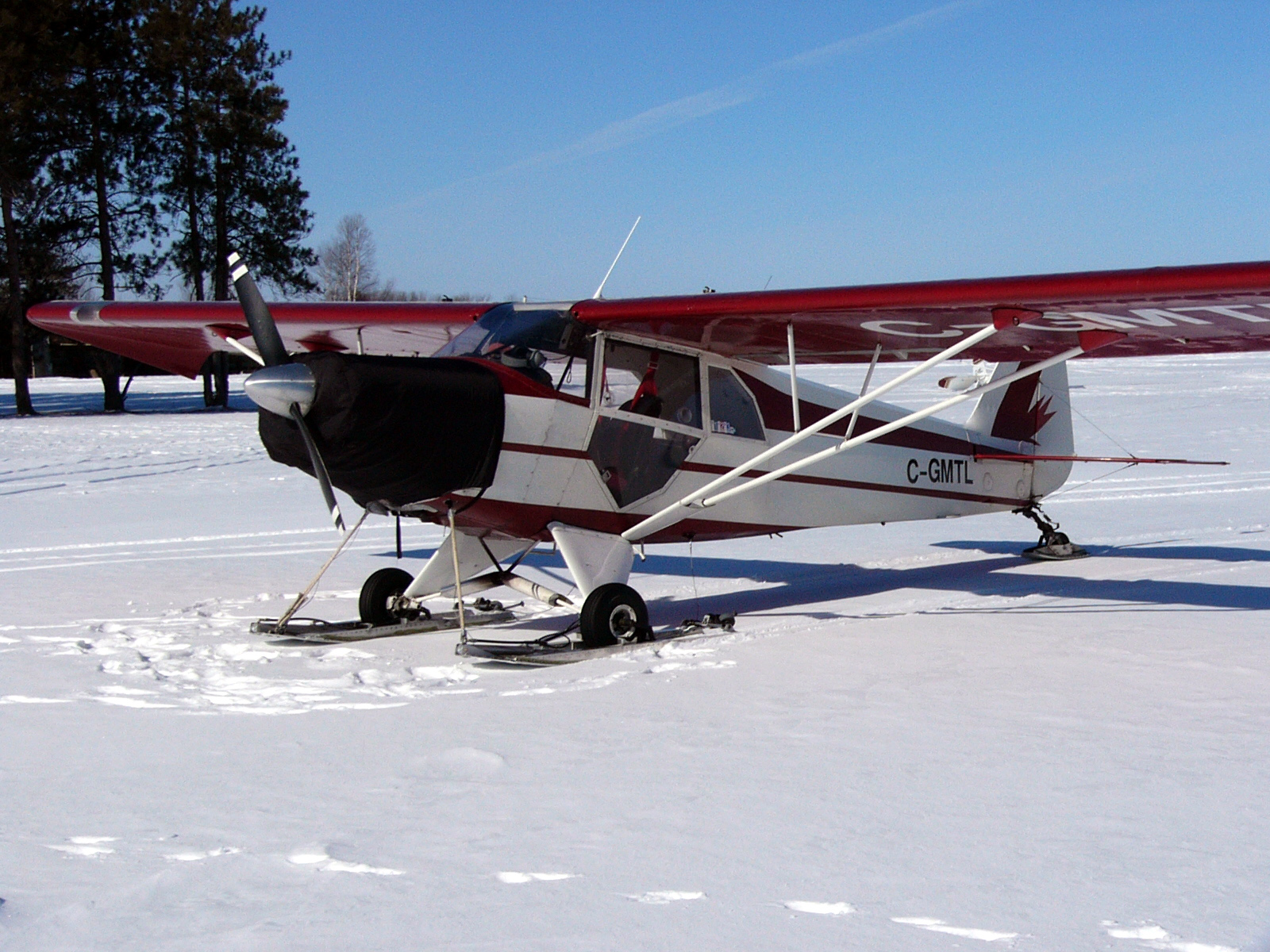
Sportsman 2+2 on skiis

Data from Manufacturer

General characteristics

- Crew: one
- Capacity: three passengers
- Length: 23 ft 4.4 in (7.122 m)
- Wingspan: 35 ft 9 in (10.896 m)
- Height: 6 ft 5 in (1.96 m)
- Wing area: 174.12 sq ft (16.176 m^{2})
- Airfoil: USA 35B Modified
- Empty weight: 1,080 lb (490 kg)
- Gross weight: 2,200 lb (998 kg)
- Fuel capacity: 39 gallons
- Powerplant: 1 × Lycoming O-360 , 180 hp (130 kW)

Performance

- Maximum speed: 116 kn (134 mph, 216 km/h)
- Cruise speed: 108 kn (124 mph, 200 km/h)
- Stall speed: 30 kn (34 mph, 55 km/h)
- Range: 580 nmi (670 mi, 1,080 km)
- Service ceiling: 14,800 ft (4,500 m)
- Rate of climb: 800 ft/min (4.1 m/s)
- Wing loading: 11.47 lb/sq ft (56.0 kg/m^{2})
