= Wag-Aero =

American aircraft parts supplier

Wag-Aero Group
- Company type: Privately held company
- Industry: Aerospace
- Founded: 1960s
- Founder: Dick and Bobbie Wagner
- Headquarters: Lyons, Wisconsin, United States
- Products: Kit aircraft and aircraft parts
- Owner: Bill Read and Mary Myers
- Website: www.wagaero.com

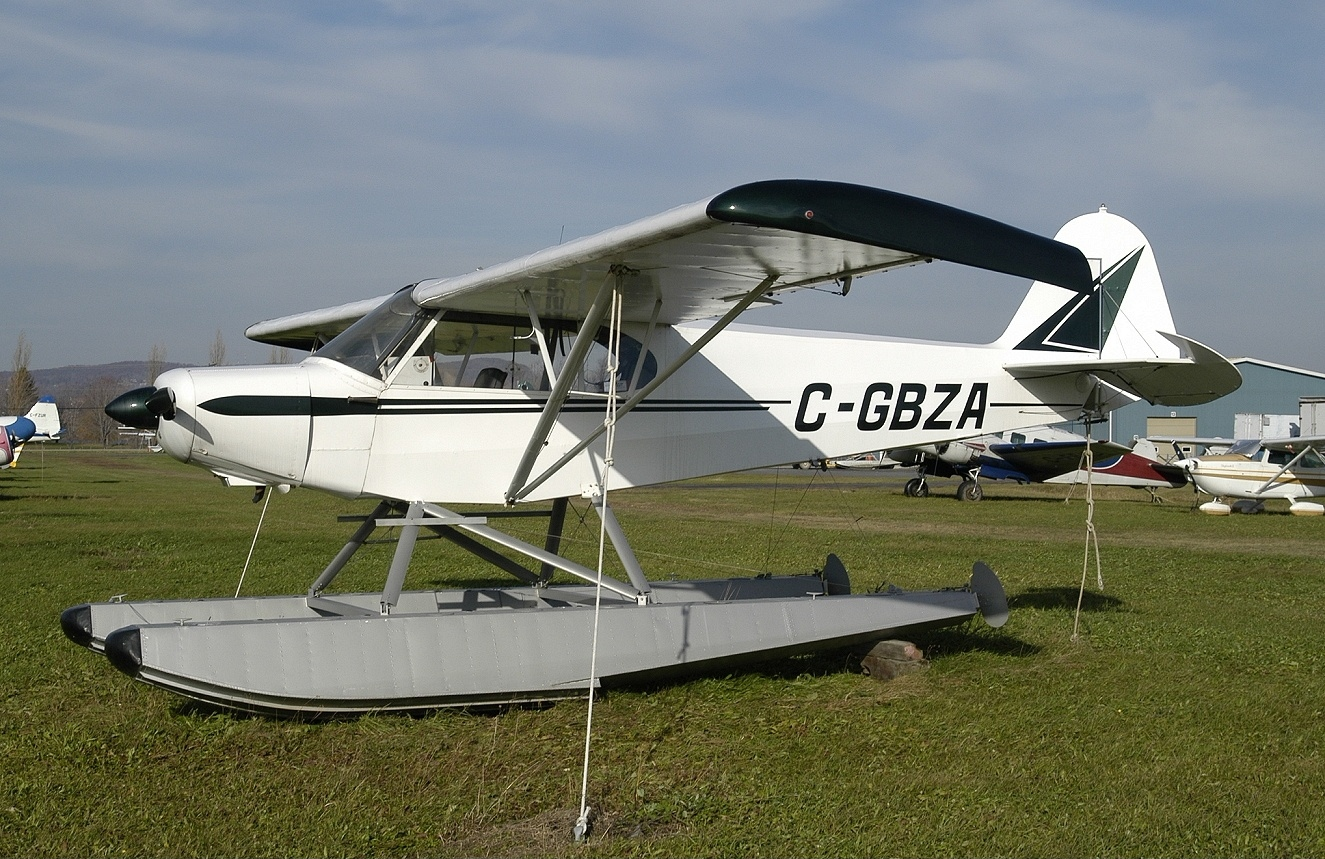
Wag-Aero CUBy on floats

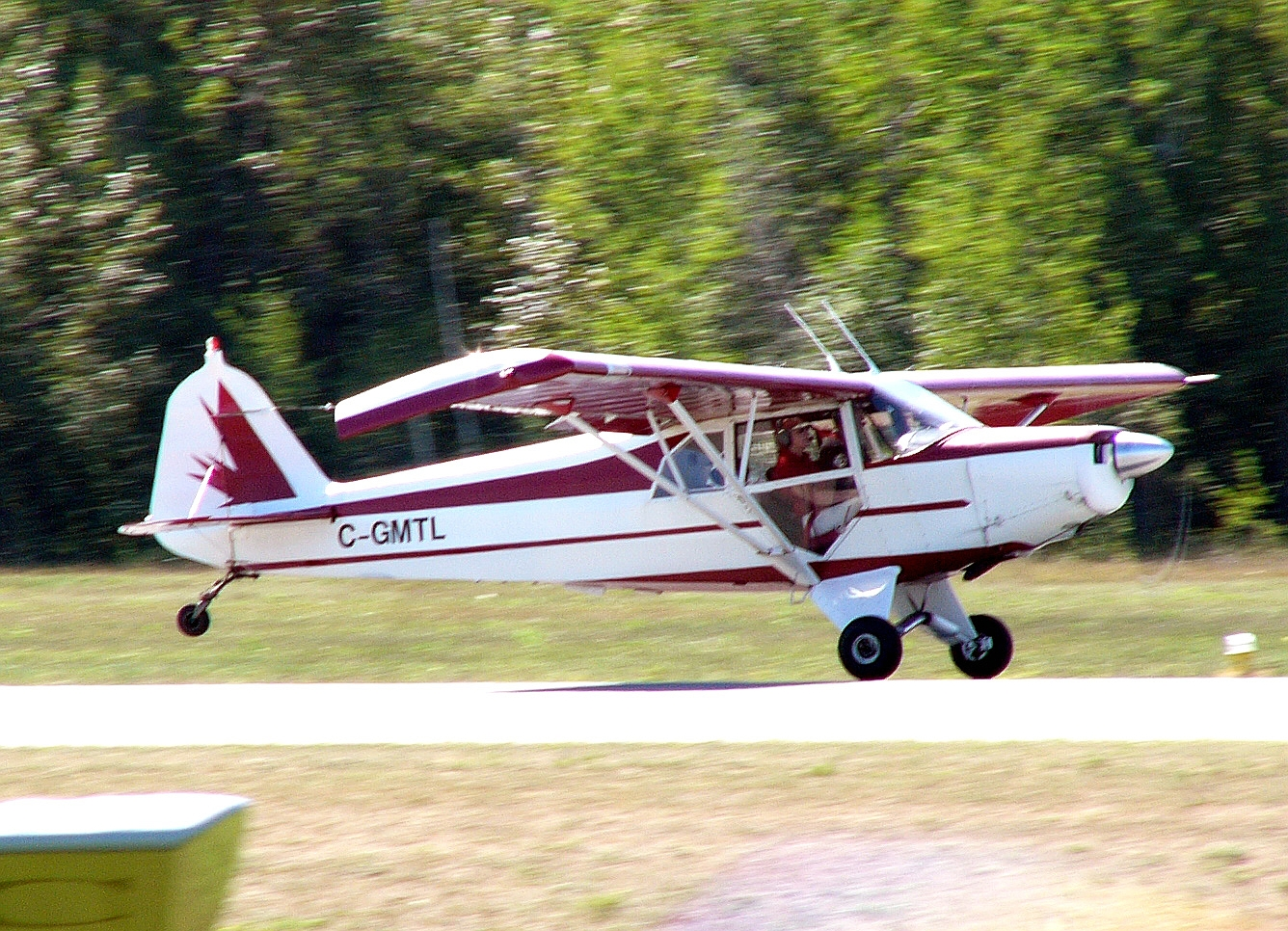
Wag-Aero Sportsman 2+2

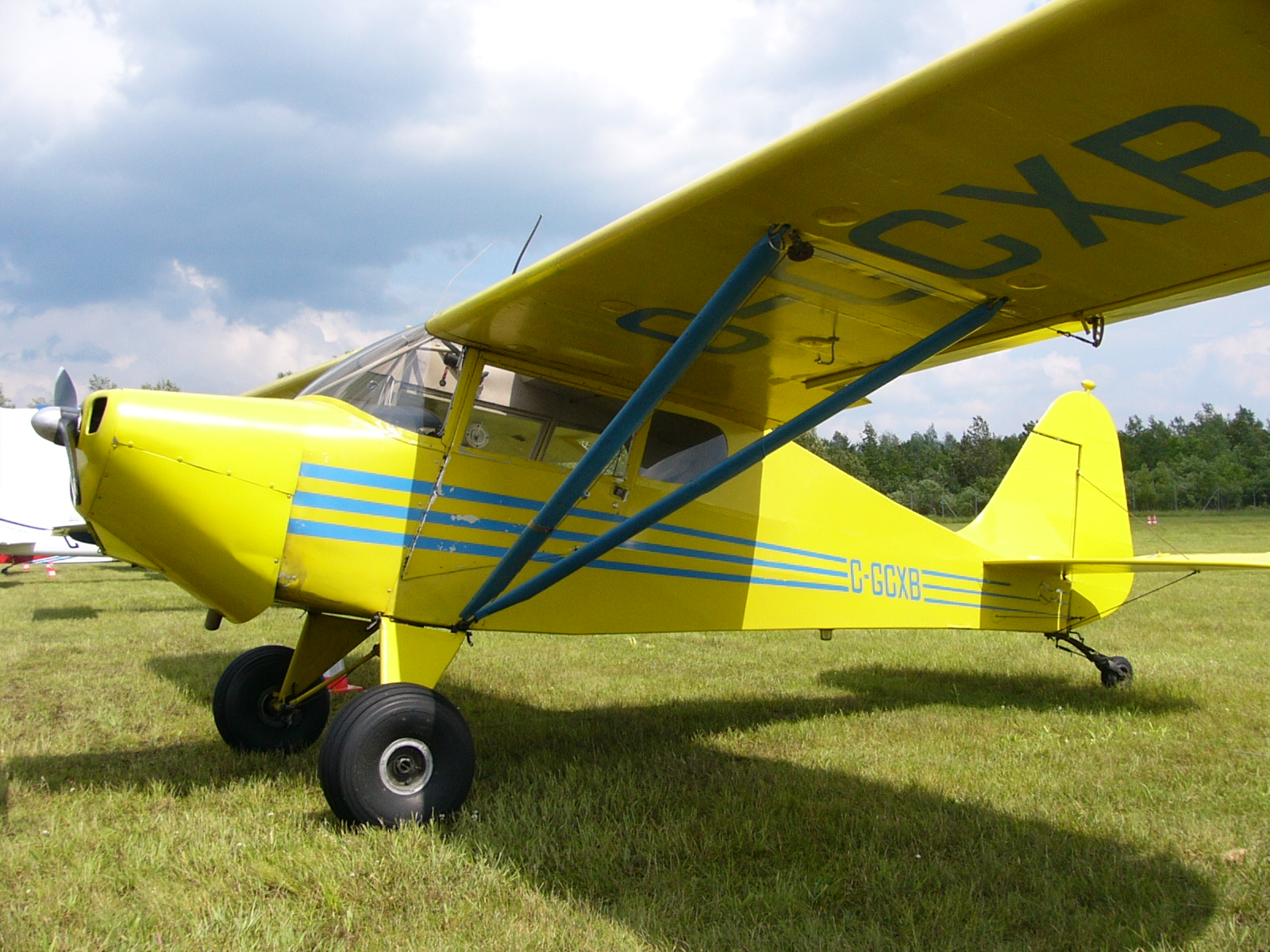
Wag-Aero Wag-a-Bond

The Wag-Aero Group is an American aircraft manufacturer that was founded by Dick and Bobbie Wagner in the 1960s and is based in Lyons, Wisconsin. The company specializes in the design and manufacture of kit aircraft and aircraft parts for amateur construction.

The company is owned by Bill Read and Mary Myers.

== Divisions ==
The Wag-Aero Group of companies includes several aerospace divisions from acquisitions, including:

- Aero Fabricators
- Ground Support Manufacturing, Inc
- Leading Edge Air Foils
- Safe Air Repair
- Viking Aero

== History ==
Wag-Aero was started by Dick and Bobbie Wagner in the 1960s and run from the basement of their home in Lyons, Wisconsin. In 1971 the company moved into permanent quarters and an aerodrome was constructed to accommodate fly-in customers, now known as Wag-Aero Airport (WI92).

The company formed a subsidiary, Aero Fabricators, in the 1970s to make welded and sheet metal aircraft parts, plus seat belts.

On 1 September 1995 the Wagners sold the group of companies to Bill Read and Mary Myers. In 1997 they purchased Viking Aero and in April 2002 acquired Ground Support Manufacturing, Inc. In 2005 they bought Safe Air Repair, a parts manufacturer. Ultralight parts supplier Leading Edge Air Foils (LEAF) was also added to the group.

== Products ==
In addition to aircraft parts, the company supplies parts and kits to construct several light aircraft designs, all based on 1930s and 1940s Piper Aircraft models.

The Wag-Aero CUBy, a Piper J-3 replica, was designed by Dick Wagner and first flew on 12 March 1975. It is offered in several different models and variants including the Acro Trainer, Observer, Sport Trainer and Super Sport.

The Wag-Aero Wag-a-Bond was also designed by Dick Wagner as a Piper PA-17 Vagabond replica and first flew on 9 June 1978.

The Wag-Aero Sportsman 2+2, also known as the Wag-Aero CHUBy CUBy, was designed by Dick Wagner and Tom Iverson as a Piper PA-14 Family Cruiser replica and first flew on 8 May 1982.

== Aircraft ==
Summary of aircraft built by Wag-Aero
Model name	First flight	Number built	Type
Wag-Aero CUBy	12 March 1975		Two seat Piper J-3 replica
Wag-Aero Wag-a-Bond	9 June 1978		Two seat Piper PA-17 replica
Wag-Aero CHUBy CUBy	8 May 1982		Four seat Piper PA-14 replica
