= Early Bird Jenny =

American homebuilt aircraft

Jenny
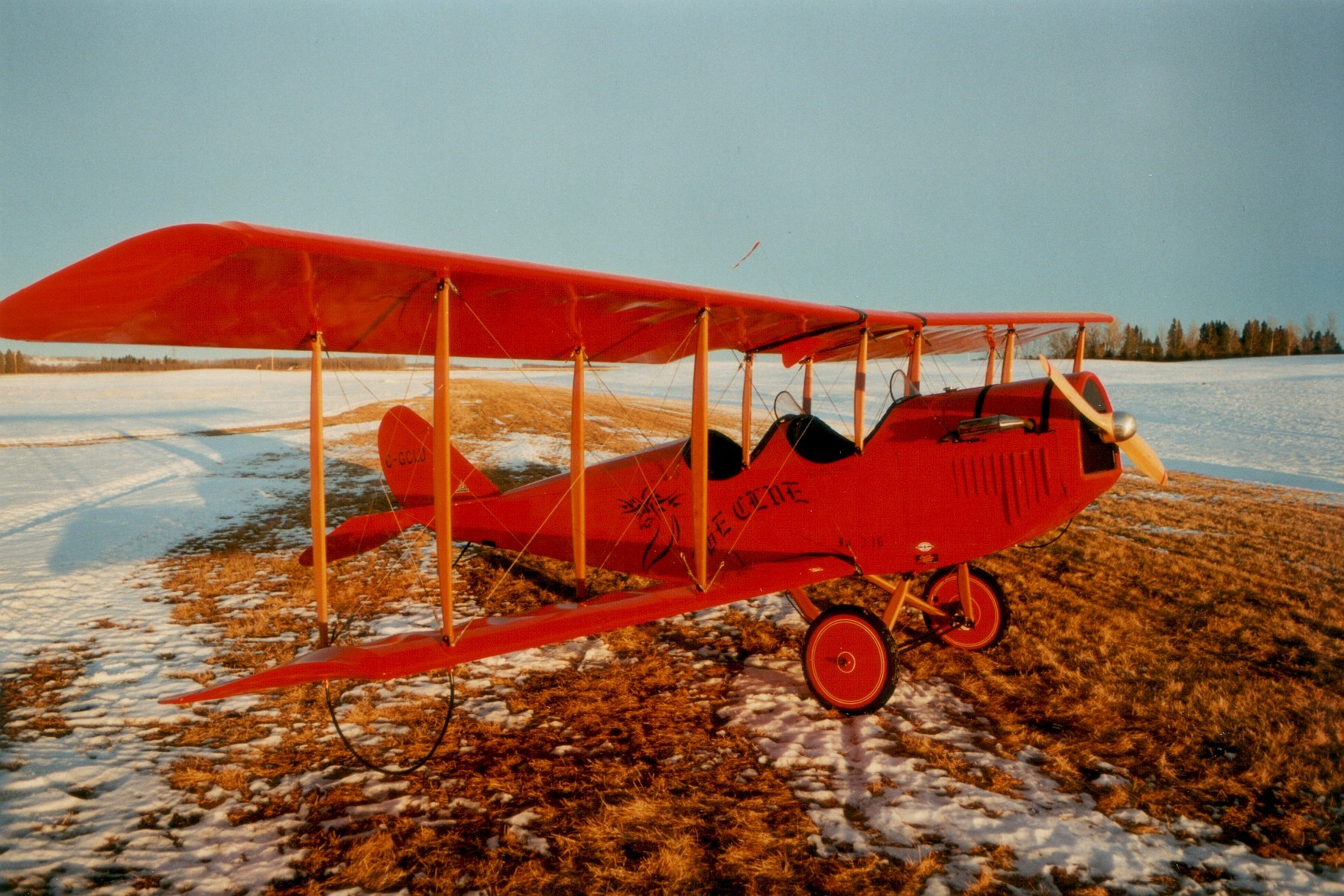

General information
- Type: Homebuilt aircraft
- National origin: United States
- Manufacturer: Early Bird Aircraft Company; Leading Edge Airfoils
- Designer: Dennis Wiley
- Status: Production completed

History
- Developed from: Curtiss JN-4 Jenny

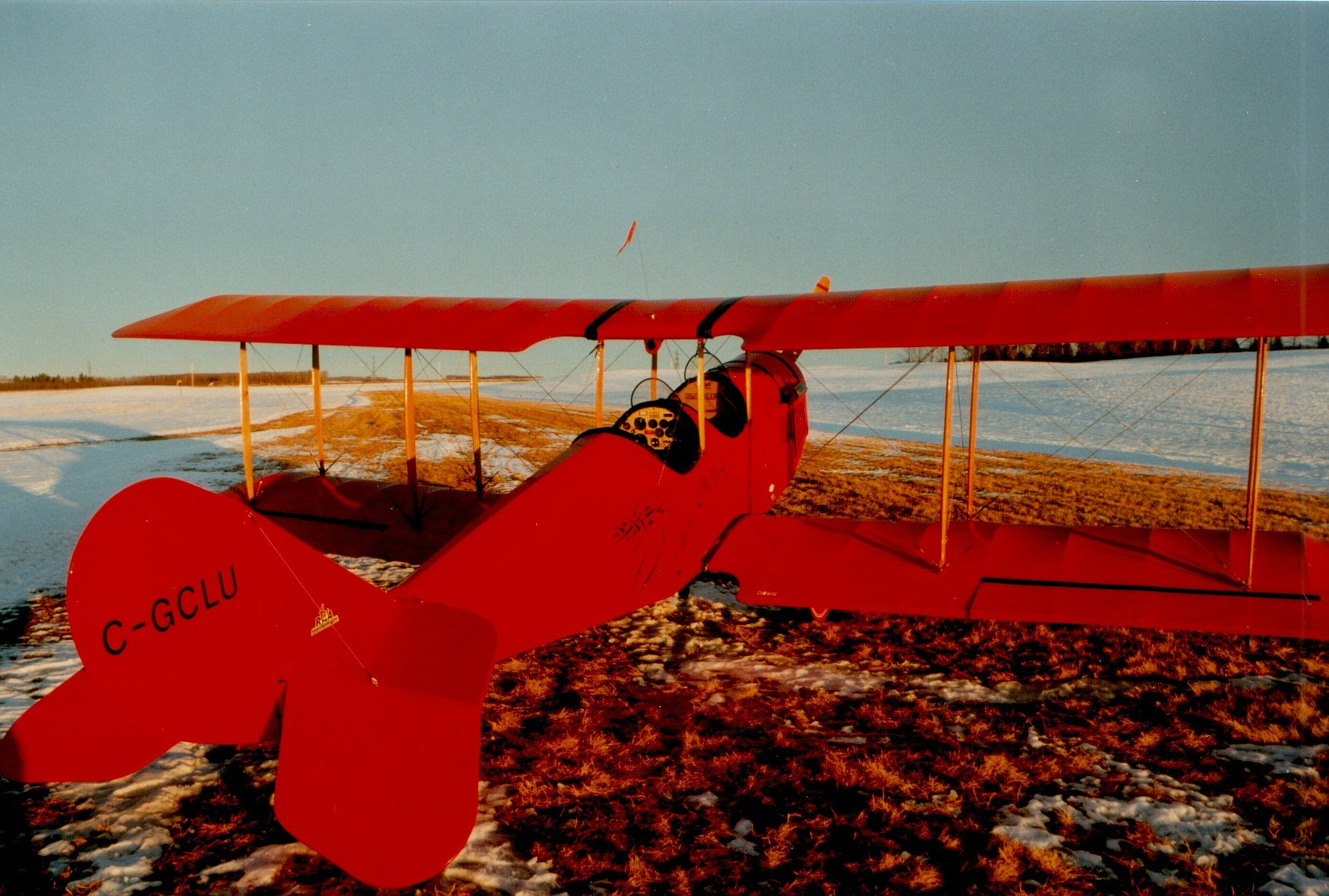
Early Bird Jenny powered by a Raven 1000 UL engine.

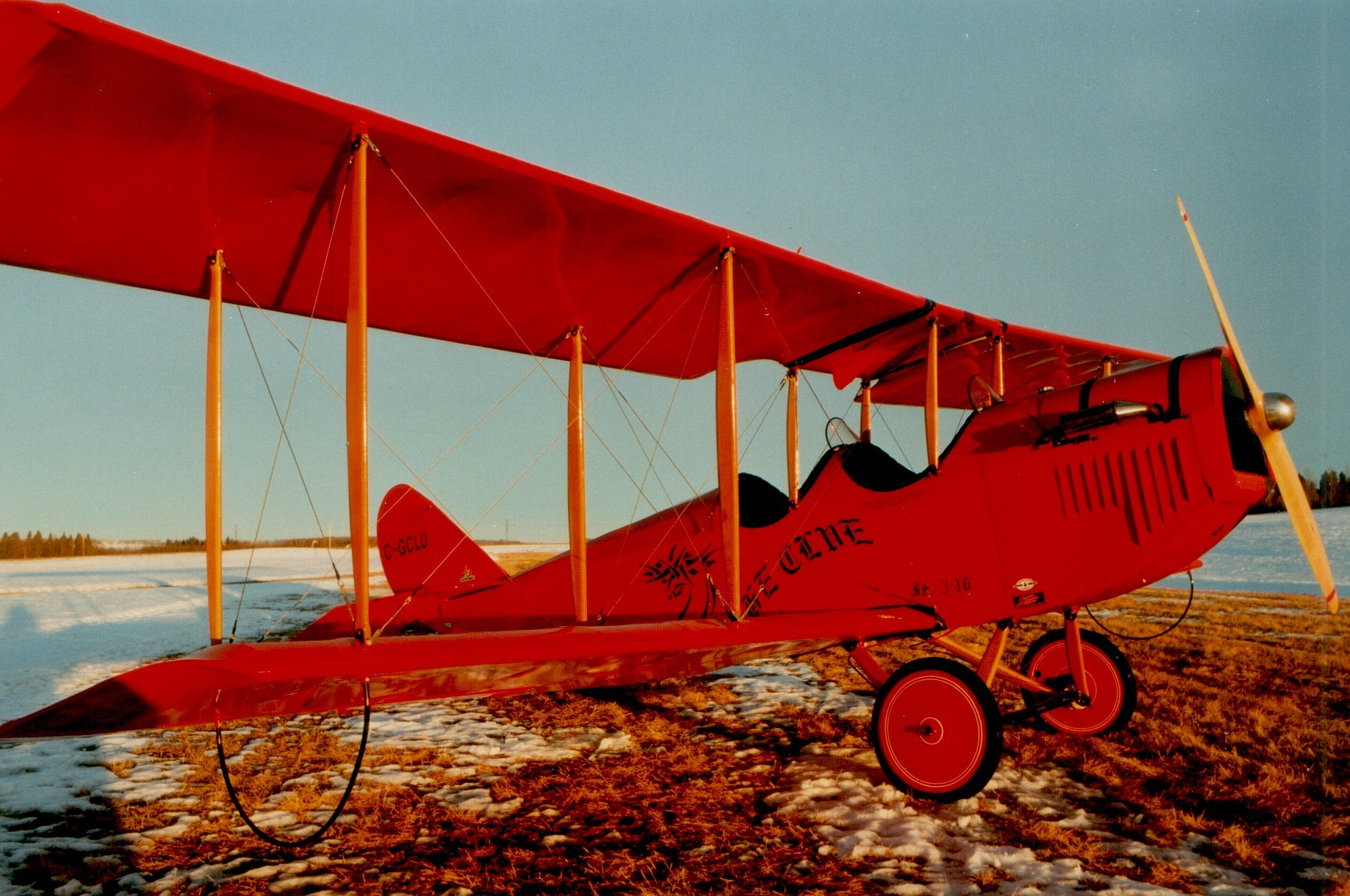
Early Bird Jenny

The Early Bird Jenny is an American homebuilt aircraft that was designed by Dennis Wiley and produced by the Early Bird Aircraft Company of Erie, Colorado, also by Leading Edge Airfoils of Peyton, Colorado. When it was available the aircraft was supplied as a kit and also in the form of plans for amateur construction.

== Design and development ==
The aircraft is a 67% scale replica of the First World War Curtiss JN-4 Jenny. It features a strut-braced biplane layout, a two-seats-in-tandem open cockpit, fixed conventional landing gear and a single engine in tractor configuration.

At the time the kit was first made available the aircraft could be constructed as a US FAR 103 Ultralight Vehicles exemption two-seat trainer or as an amateur-built aircraft.

The Jenny is made from a mix of steel and aluminum tubing, with some wooden parts and its flying surfaces covered with doped aircraft fabric. Its 27.50 ft (8.4 m) span wing has a wing area of 175.0 sq ft (16.26 m^{2}) and the cockpit width is 24 in (61 cm). The acceptable power range is 46 to 65 hp (34 to 48 kW) and the standard engines used are the 50 hp (37 kW) Rotax 503, 64 hp (48 kW) Rotax 532, 64 hp (48 kW) Rotax 582, 74 hp (55 kW) Rotax 618 two-stroke engines and the 62 hp (46 kW) Geo Metro-based fuel injected Raven 1000 UL three cylinder, inline, liquid-cooled, four stroke automotive conversion powerplant.

The aircraft has a typical empty weight of 419 lb (190 kg) and a gross weight of 800 lb (360 kg), giving a useful load of 381 lb (173 kg). With full fuel of 9 U.S. gallons (34 L; 7.5 imp gal) the payload for pilot, passenger and baggage is 327 lb (148 kg).

The supplied kit included the Rotax 503 engine. The manufacturer estimated the aircraft's construction time from the kit to be 500 hours.

== Operational history ==
By 1998 the company reported that 53 kits had been sold and 24 aircraft were flying.

== Specifications (Gen 1) ==
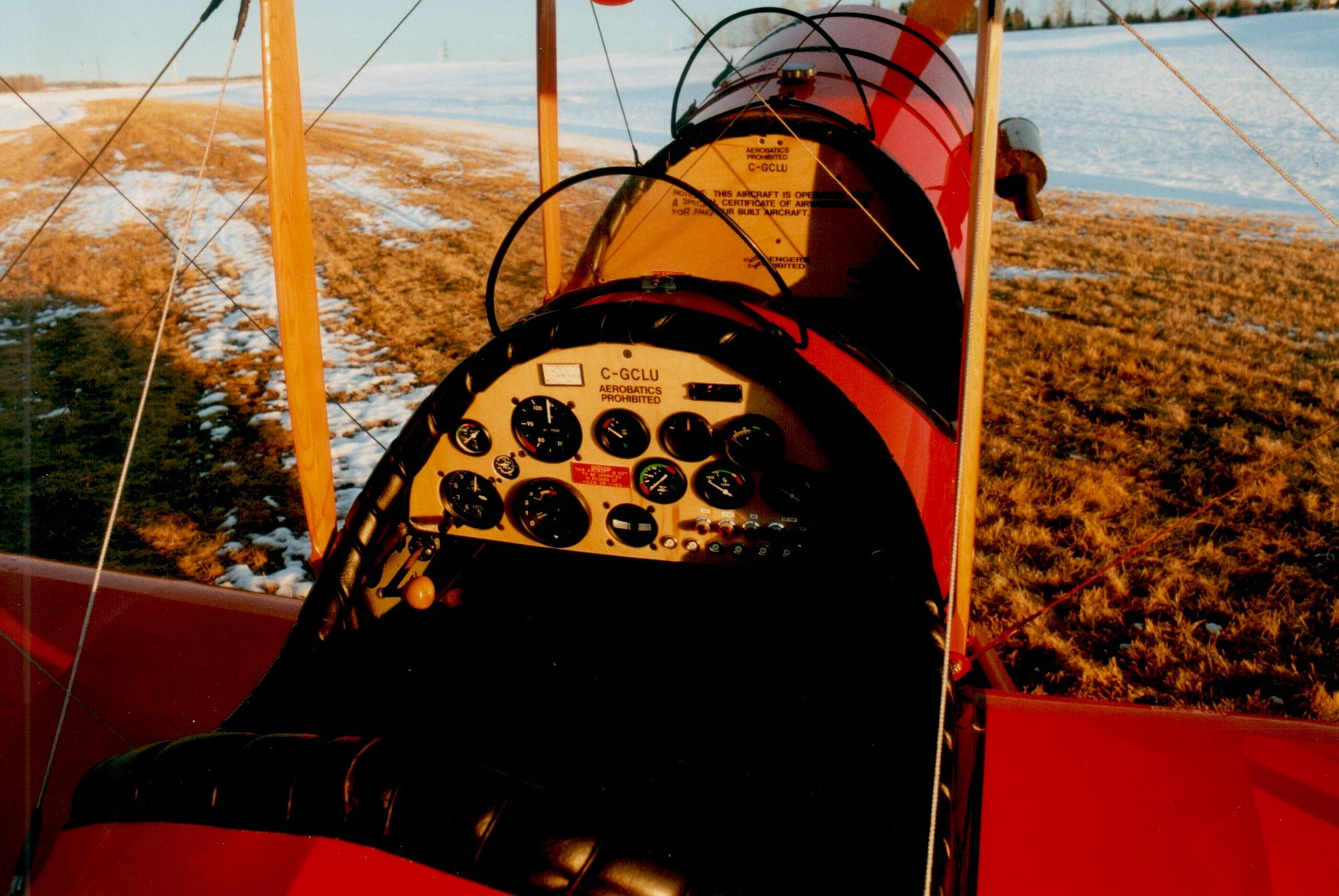
Early Bird Jenny instrument panel

Data from AeroCrafter

General characteristics

- Crew: Two
- Length: 18 ft 4 in (5.59 m)
- Wingspan: 27 ft 6 in (8.38 m)
- Wing area: 175.0 sq ft (16.26 m^{2})
- Empty weight: 419 lb (190 kg)
- Gross weight: 800 lb (363 kg)
- Fuel capacity: 9 U.S. gallons (34 L; 7.5 imp gal)
- Powerplant: 1 × Rotax 503 twin cylinder, inline, air-cooled, two stroke aircraft engine, 50 hp (37 kW)
- Propellers: 2-bladed wooden

Performance

- Maximum speed: 70 mph (110 km/h, 61 kn)
- Cruise speed: 65 mph (105 km/h, 56 kn)
- Stall speed: 35 mph (56 km/h, 30 kn)
- Range: 130 mi (210 km, 110 nmi)
- Service ceiling: 14,000 ft (4,300 m)
- Rate of climb: 800 ft/min (4.1 m/s)
- Wing loading: 4.6 lb/sq ft (22 kg/m^{2})

== Specifications (Gen 2) ==
Data from AeroCrafter

General characteristics

- Crew: Two
- Length: 20 ft 6 in (6.25 m)
- Wingspan: 30 ft (9.1 m)
- Empty weight: 600–700 lb (272–318 kg)
- Gross weight: 1,200 lb (544 kg)Build time hr: 500 hours~
- Powerplant: 1 × Rotax 912 , 80–100 hp (60–75 kW)
- Propellers: 2-bladed wooden

Performance

- Cruise speed: 70 mph (110 km/h, 61 kn)
- Stall speed: 35 mph (56 km/h, 30 kn)
- Never exceed speed: 85 mph (137 km/h, 74 kn)
- Service ceiling: 14,000 ft (4,300 m)
- g limits: +4.0, -2.0
- Rate of climb: 1,000 ft/min (5.1 m/s)
