= Early Bird Spad 13 =

American homebuilt aircraft

Spad 13

General information
- Type: Homebuilt aircraft
- National origin: United States
- Manufacturer: Early Bird Aircraft Company
- Status: Production completed

History
- Developed from: SPAD S.XIII

The Early Bird Spad 13 (also SPAD 13) is an American homebuilt aircraft that was designed and produced by the Early Bird Aircraft Company of Erie, Colorado. When it was available the aircraft was supplied as a kit and also in the form of plans for amateur construction.

== Design and development ==
The Spad 13 is an 80% scale replica of the First World War SPAD S.XIII. It features a strut-braced biplane layout, a single-seat open cockpit, fixed conventional landing gear and a single engine in tractor configuration.

The aircraft is made from a mix of steel and aluminum tubing, with some wooden parts and its flying surfaces are covered with doped aircraft fabric. Its 20.17 ft (6.1 m) span wing has a wing area of 142.0 sq ft (13.19 m^{2}). The cockpit width is 24 in (61 cm). The acceptable power range is 80 to 100 hp (60 to 75 kW) and the standard engine used is the 85 hp (63 kW) fuel injected Geo Tracker four-cylinder, inline, liquid-cooled, four stroke automotive conversion powerplant.

The Spad 13 has a typical empty weight of 550 lb (250 kg) and a gross weight of 800 lb (360 kg), giving a useful load of 250 lb (110 kg). With full fuel of 9 U.S. gallons (34 L; 7.5 imp gal) the payload for pilot and baggage is 196 lb (89 kg).

The supplied kit included the Tracker engine. The manufacturer estimated the construction time from the kit to be 600 hours.

== Operational history ==
By 1998 the company reported that 35 kits had been sold and one aircraft was flying.

== Specifications (Spad 13) ==
Data from AeroCrafter

General characteristics

- Crew: one
- Length: 16 ft 3 in (4.95 m)
- Wingspan: 20 ft 2 in (6.15 m)
- Wing area: 142.0 sq ft (13.19 m^{2})
- Empty weight: 550 lb (249 kg)
- Gross weight: 800 lb (363 kg)
- Fuel capacity: 9 U.S. gallons (34 L; 7.5 imp gal)
- Powerplant: 1 × Geo Tracker four cylinder, fuel injected, inline, liquid-cooled, four stroke automotive conversion engine, 85 hp (63 kW)
- Propellers: 2-bladed wooden

Performance

- Maximum speed: 90 mph (140 km/h, 78 kn)
- Cruise speed: 80 mph (130 km/h, 70 kn)
- Stall speed: 45 mph (72 km/h, 39 kn)
- Range: 240 mi (390 km, 210 nmi)
- Service ceiling: 14,000 ft (4,300 m)
- Rate of climb: 800 ft/min (4.1 m/s)
- Wing loading: 5.6 lb/sq ft (27 kg/m^{2})
