= Graffito =

Graffito may refer to:

- Graffito (archaeology)
- Graffito (drawing technique)
- Graffito of Esmet-Akhom

== See also ==
- Graffiti (singular Italian: graffito)
- Graffiti (disambiguation)
