= Raven 1000 UL =

American homebuilt aircraft engine

1000 UL
- Type: Aircraft engine
- National origin: United States
- Manufacturer: Raven Redrives
- Developed from: Suzuki G10 automotive engine

The Raven 1000 UL is an American aircraft engine, that was designed and produced by Raven Redrives of El Prado, New Mexico for use in ultralight and homebuilt aircraft.

The company seems to have gone out of business in 2017 and production ended.

== Design and development ==
The engine is a development of the Suzuki G10 automotive engine. It is a three-cylinder in-line four-stroke, liquid-cooled, gasoline engine design, with a custom-designed belt-type reduction drive with reduction ratio of 2.11:1. It employs electronic ignition and produces 62 hp (46 kW) at 5700 rpm.

== Applications ==
- Early Bird Jenny

== Specifications (1000 UL) ==
Data from World Directory of Leisure Aviation 2011-12

=== General characteristics ===
- Type: Three-cylinder, in-line, liquid-cooled, four-stroke aircraft engine
- Bore: 74 mm (2.9 in)
- Stroke: 77 mm (3.0 in)
- Displacement: 993 cc (60.6 cu in)
- Dry weight: 67 kg (147.7 lb)

=== Components ===
- Fuel type: gasoline
- Cooling system: liquid
- Reduction gear: custom-designed belt-type reduction drive with reduction ratio of 2.11:1

=== Performance ===
- Power output: 62 hp (46 kW) at 5700 rpm

== See also ==
Related lists

- List of aircraft engines
