= Wag-Aero Wag-a-Bond =

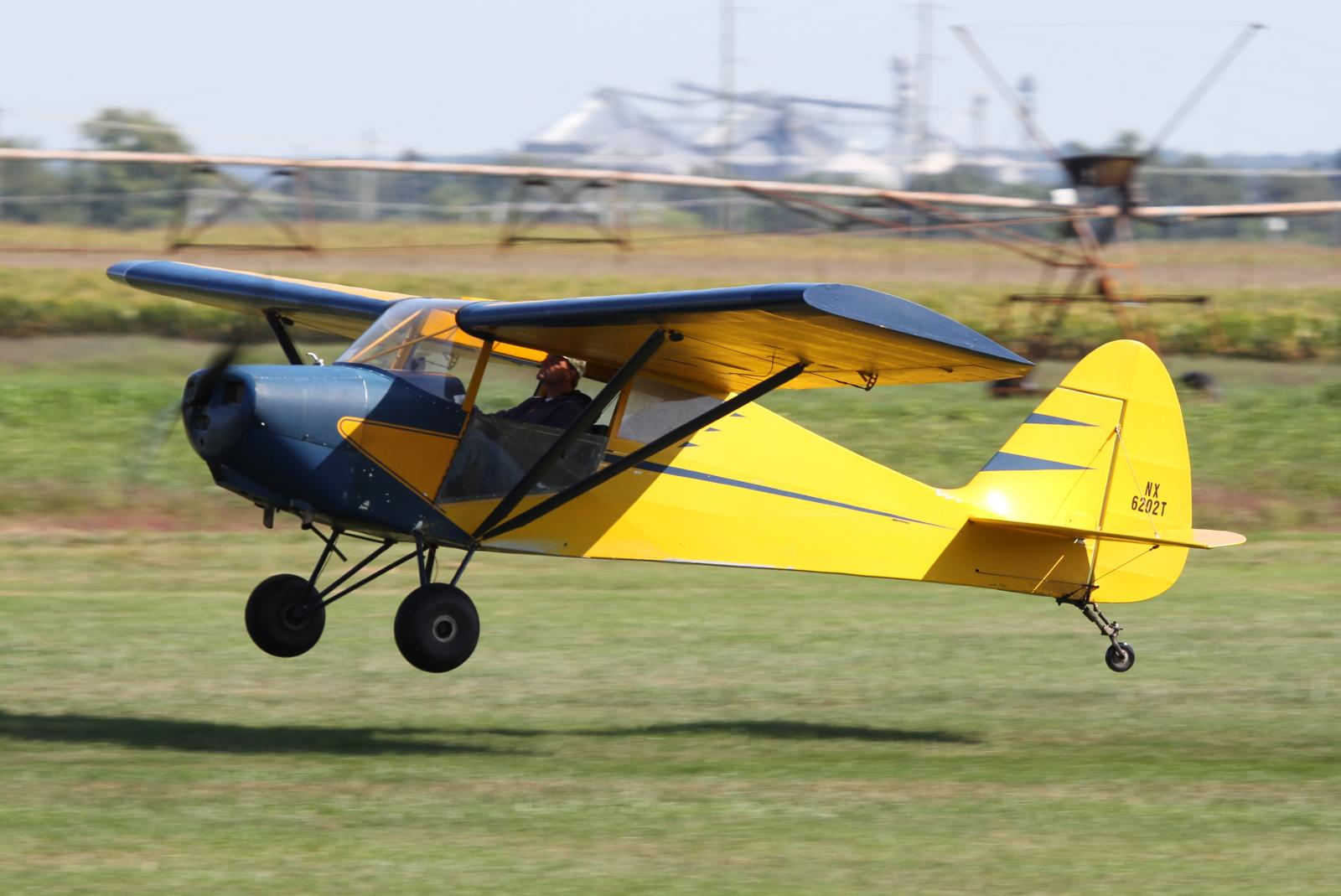

General information
- Type: Homebuilt aircraft
- National origin: United States
- Manufacturer: Wag-Aero
- Designer: Dick Wagner
- Number built: 722 (December 2011)

History
- First flight: June 9, 1978
- Developed from: Piper Vagabond

The Wag-Aero Wag-a-Bond is a high-wing two-seat side-by-side homebuilt aircraft of tube-and-fabric construction. It is replica of the Piper Vagabond taildragger and produced by Wag-Aero in kit form.

== Design and development ==
The Wag-A-Bond was the second homebuilt replica of a Piper product from parts supplier Wag-Aero. The aircraft was built to provide a side-by-side product following success of the tandem seat Wag-Aero CUBy.

The Wag-a-Bond was initially a replica of Piper's Vagabond aircraft. The Wag-A-Bond Traveler is based on the Vagabond, but has several modifications. This features larger engine options of 108 to 115 hp (81 to 86 kW) and cargo space for camping gear. The Traveler has doors on both sides of the cabin and two wing-mounted fuel tanks with a small header tank. The wings are the same as the Wag-Aero Acro Trainer and are built with spruce spars, wooden ribs and covered with 2024-T3 aluminium sheet. The original Wag-a-Bond design is marketed as the Wag-a-Bond Classic.

Wag-Aero company president Dick Wagner flew the Wag-a-Bond for the first time on June 9, 1978.

== Variants ==
Classic
Original design, a reproduction of the Piper PA-17. Recommended engine power range from 65 to 100 hp (48 to 75 kW).
Traveler
Improved model with two doors, additional wing fuel tanks and enlarged baggage compartment. Recommended engine power range from 108 to 115 hp (81 to 86 kW)

== Specifications Wag-a-Bond Classic ==
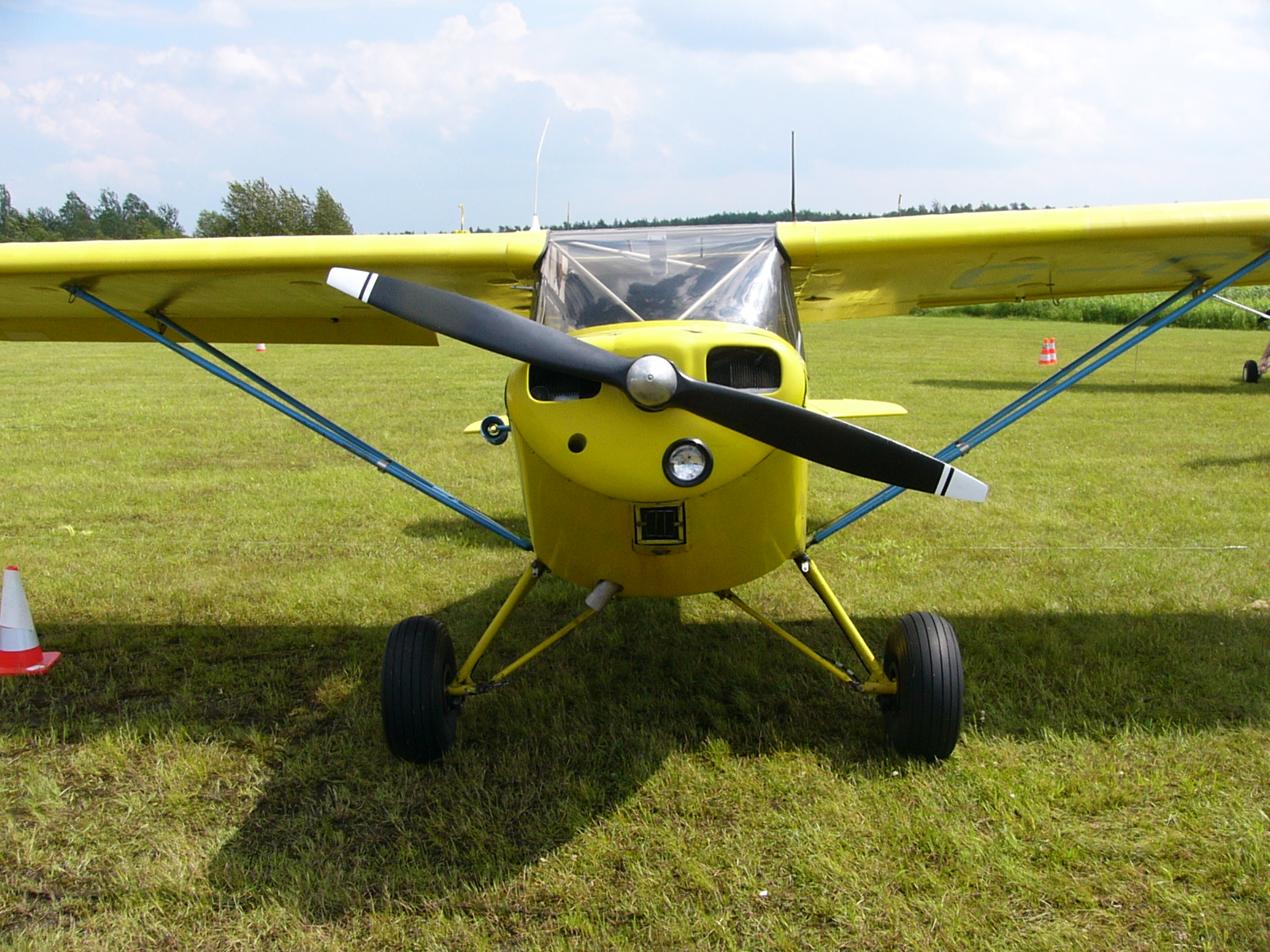
Wag-A-Bond

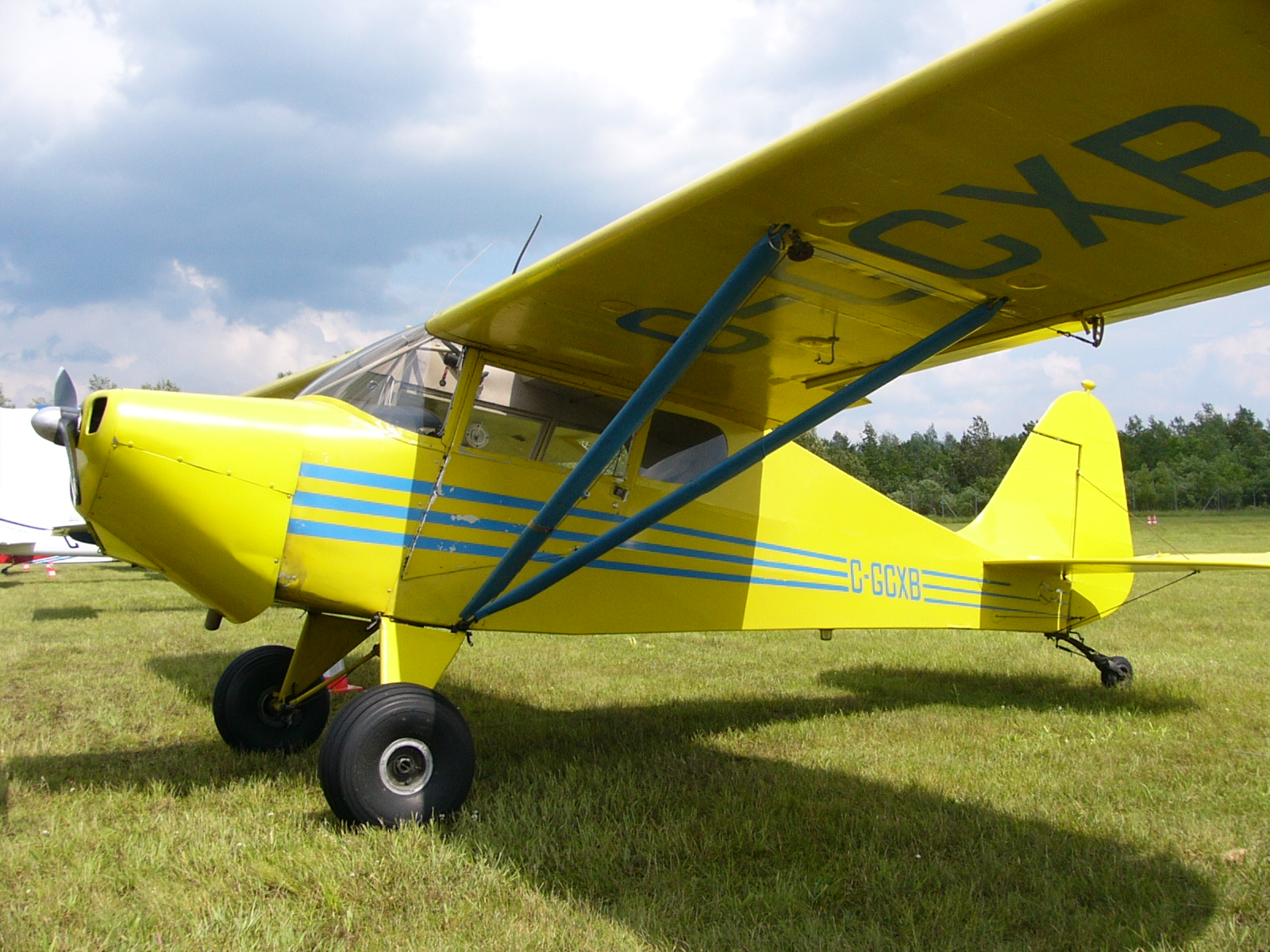
Wag-A-Bond

Data from Manufacturer

General characteristics

- Capacity: 2
- Length: 18.7 ft (5.7 m)
- Wingspan: 29 ft 3 in (8.92 m)
- Height: 6 ft (1.8 m)
- Wing area: 147.5 sq ft (13.70 m^{2})
- Empty weight: 700 lb (318 kg)
- Gross weight: 1,250 lb (567 kg)
- Fuel capacity: 12

Performance

- Maximum speed: 91 kn (105 mph, 169 km/h)
- Cruise speed: 83 kn (95 mph, 153 km/h)
- Stall speed: 39 kn (45 mph, 72 km/h)
- Rate of climb: 625 ft/min (3.18 m/s)

== See also ==
Aircraft of comparable role, configuration, and era

- Buzzman L'il Buzzard
- RagWing RW11 Rag-A-Bond
