= J & J Ultralights Tukan =

American ultralight trike

Tukan

General information
- Type: Ultralight trike
- National origin: United States
- Manufacturer: J & J Ultralights; Leading Edge Air Foils; Kemmeries Aviation
- Status: Production completed
- Number built: 30 (February 2000)

The J & J Ultralights Tukan (English: Toucan) is an American ultralight trike that was marketed by J & J Ultralights, Leading Edge Air Foils and Kemmeries Aviation. The aircraft was supplied as a kit, as parts and as plans for amateur construction.

== Design and development ==
The aircraft was designed to comply with the US FAR 103 Ultralight Vehicles rules, including the category's maximum empty weight of 254 lb (115 kg). The aircraft has a standard empty weight of 250 lb (113 kg). It features a cable-braced hang glider-style high wing, weight-shift controls, an open cockpit, tricycle landing gear and a single engine in pusher configuration.

The aircraft is made from bolted-together aluminum tubing, with its single-surface wing covered in Dacron sailcloth. Its 35 ft (10.7 m) span wing is supported by a single tube-type kingpost and uses an "A" frame control bar. The landing gear uses fiberglass rods for mainwheel suspension and the nosewheel features a drum brake. The pilot is accommodated on a seat that can be quickly converted into a tandem second seat. The standard wing supplied was a J & J single-surface wing, but other wings of suitable gross weight can be used. The specified powerplant is the 40 hp (30 kW) Rotax 447 twin-cylinder, two-stroke, single-ignition aircraft engine.

Assembly time from the kit is about 30 hours. The aircraft can be disassembled for ground transport in a van or pickup truck or storage by one person in 25 minutes. The Tukan can be used for crop spraying and also hang glider towing. Thirty examples were reported as completed and flying in February 2000.

== Specifications (J & J Tukan) ==
Data from Cliche and Kitplanes

General characteristics

- Crew: one
- Capacity: one passenger
- Length: 7 ft (2.1 m)
- Wingspan: 35 ft (11 m)
- Height: 10.6 ft (3.2 m)
- Wing area: 190 sq ft (18 m^{2})
- Empty weight: 250 lb (113 kg)
- Gross weight: 750 lb (340 kg)
- Fuel capacity: 5 U.S. gallons (19 L; 4.2 imp gal)
- Powerplant: 1 × Rotax 447 twin cylinder, two-stroke, single ignition aircraft engine, 40 hp (30 kW)

Performance

- Cruise speed: 40 mph (64 km/h, 35 kn)
- Stall speed: 24 mph (39 km/h, 21 kn)
- Service ceiling: 15,000 ft (4,600 m)
- Rate of climb: 750 ft/min (3.8 m/s)

== See also ==
- J & J Ultralights
- J & J Ultralights Seawing
