= Wag-Aero CUBy =

Aircraft replica

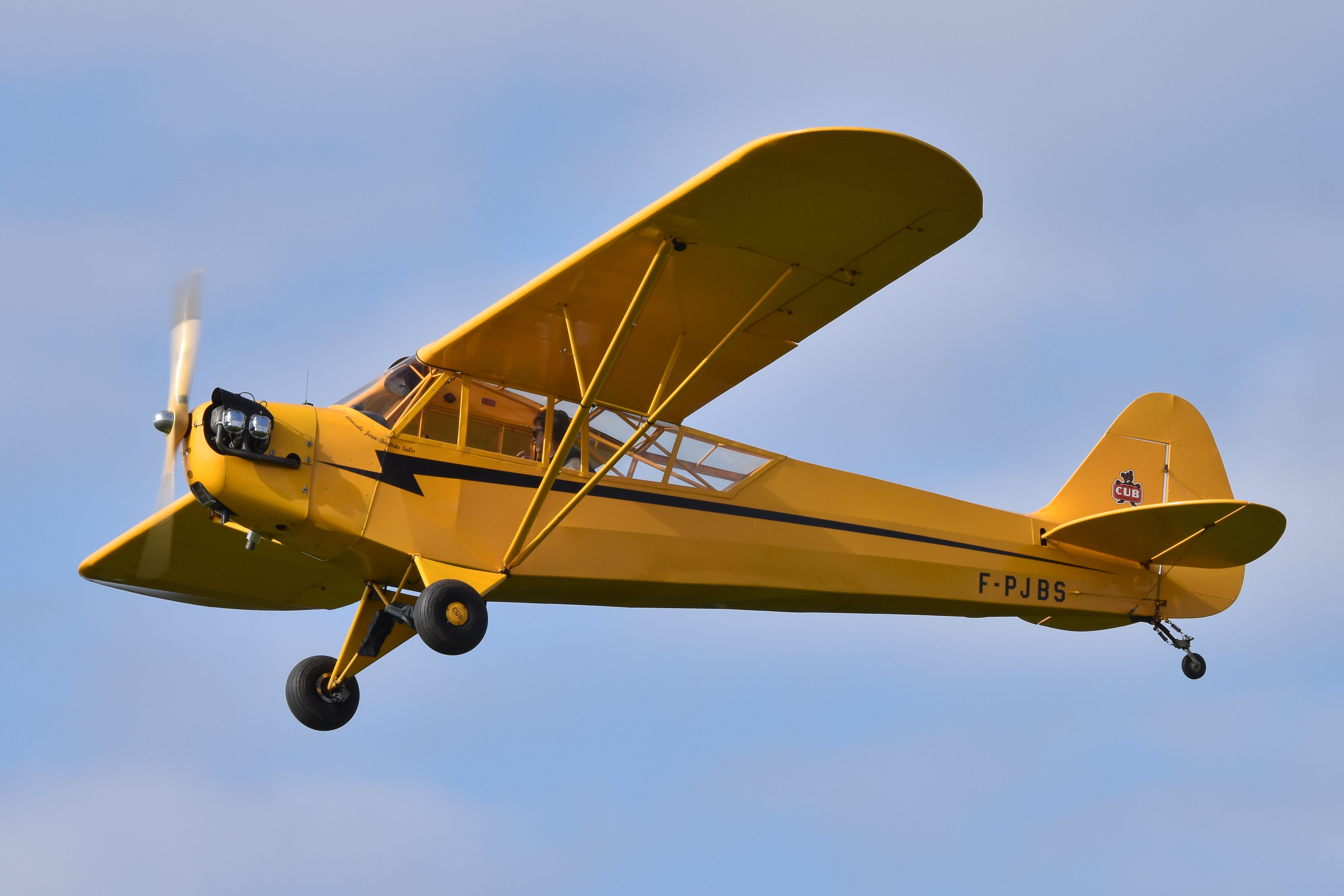

General information
- Type: Homebuilt aircraft
- National origin: United States
- Manufacturer: Wag-Aero
- Designer: Dick Wagner

History
- Introduction date: 1975
- First flight: 12 March 1975
- Developed from: Piper J-3

The Wag-Aero CUBy is a replica of the Piper J-3, designed by Dick Wagner and marketed by Wag-Aero of Lyons, Wisconsin as plans or in kit form.

The aircraft is currently marketed under the name Wag-Aero Sport Trainer.

== Design and development ==
Wag-Aero started with a line of inspection covers, then eventually a comprehensive line of aircraft parts, including a full line of parts for the Piper Cub. After several attempts to purchase the rights to the Piper Cub for new production, Wag-Aero owner Jack Wagner designed a homebuilt kit that would allow homebuilders to construct new aircraft similar to the Cub.

While the CUBy was initially offered with wooden wing ribs and spars like the Piper Cub, aluminum ribs and spars were later added as an option, also like later Cubs. The aircraft does differ from the original Piper design in several ways including having its fuselage fabricated from 4130 steel instead of the Cub's original 1025 carbon steel and utilizing a conventional elevator-mounted trim tab in place of the Cub's jack screw trimming system that adjusts the Cub's elevator angle of incidence.

The CUBy drawings were drafted by Bill Blake.

The prototype first flew on March 12, 1975 fitted with skis.

== Operational history ==
The introductory model was displayed with a contrasting paint scheme, one half painted green with a yellow stripe, and the other half painted yellow with a green stripe. This unusual "court jester" paint scheme was used to differentiate the prototype from the standard yellow scheme used on the Piper Cub, for marketing purposes. Paul Poberezny became the first customer to build a CUBy. Poberezny's aircraft became part of the EAA AirVenture Museum Foundation and was used to demonstrate the use of automotive fuel in aircraft engines for the Experimental Aircraft Association. The designer of the aircraft Dick Wagner flew the unpressurized aircraft as high as 20,000 ft (6,096 m) to demonstrate that auto fuel would not cause vapor lock.

== Variants ==
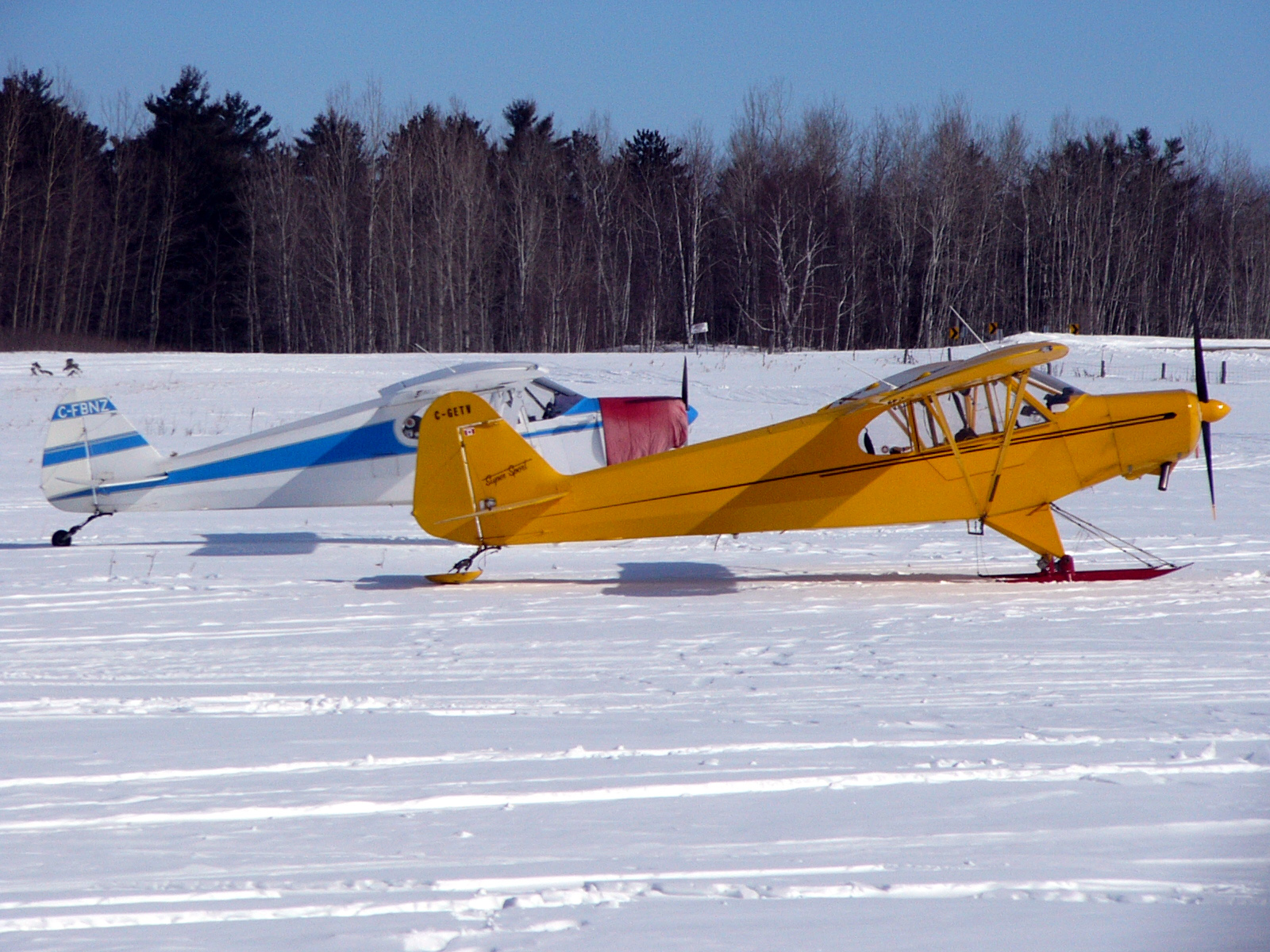
Wag-Aero Super Sport (front) with a Piper PA-12.

CUBy
Base model, powered by a recommended standard Continental C-85 engine of 85 hp (63 kW)
CUBy Acro Trainer
Developed in 1977, the aircraft was fitted with a 135 hp (101 kW) Lycoming and clipped wings. The prototype featured the unique split-down the middle paint scheme employed by Wag-Aero.
Observer
Sport Trainer with modifications to alter the window installation to resemble the Piper L-4
Sport Trainer
Original CUBy renamed, powered by engines in the recommended range of 65 to 100 hp (48 to 75 kW). By December 2011 250 examples had been completed and flown.
Super Sport
Sport trainer with modifications to accept engines of up to 150 hp (112 kW)

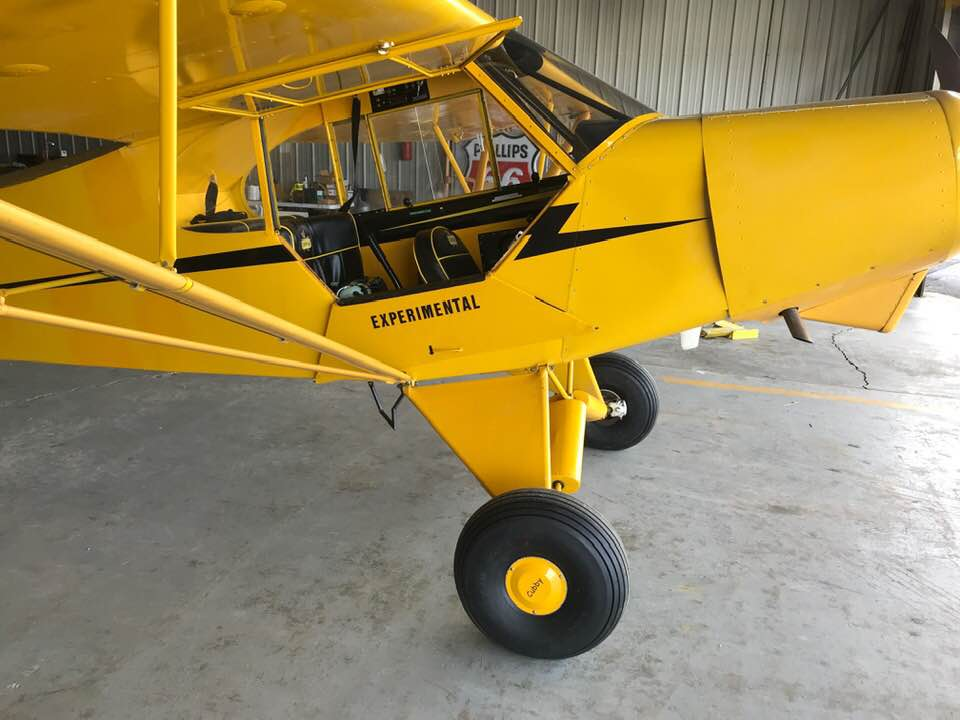
2005 Wag Aero Super Sport 150 HP with 8.5-6 Dresser Maine Tires

== Specifications (Wag-Aero CUBy) ==
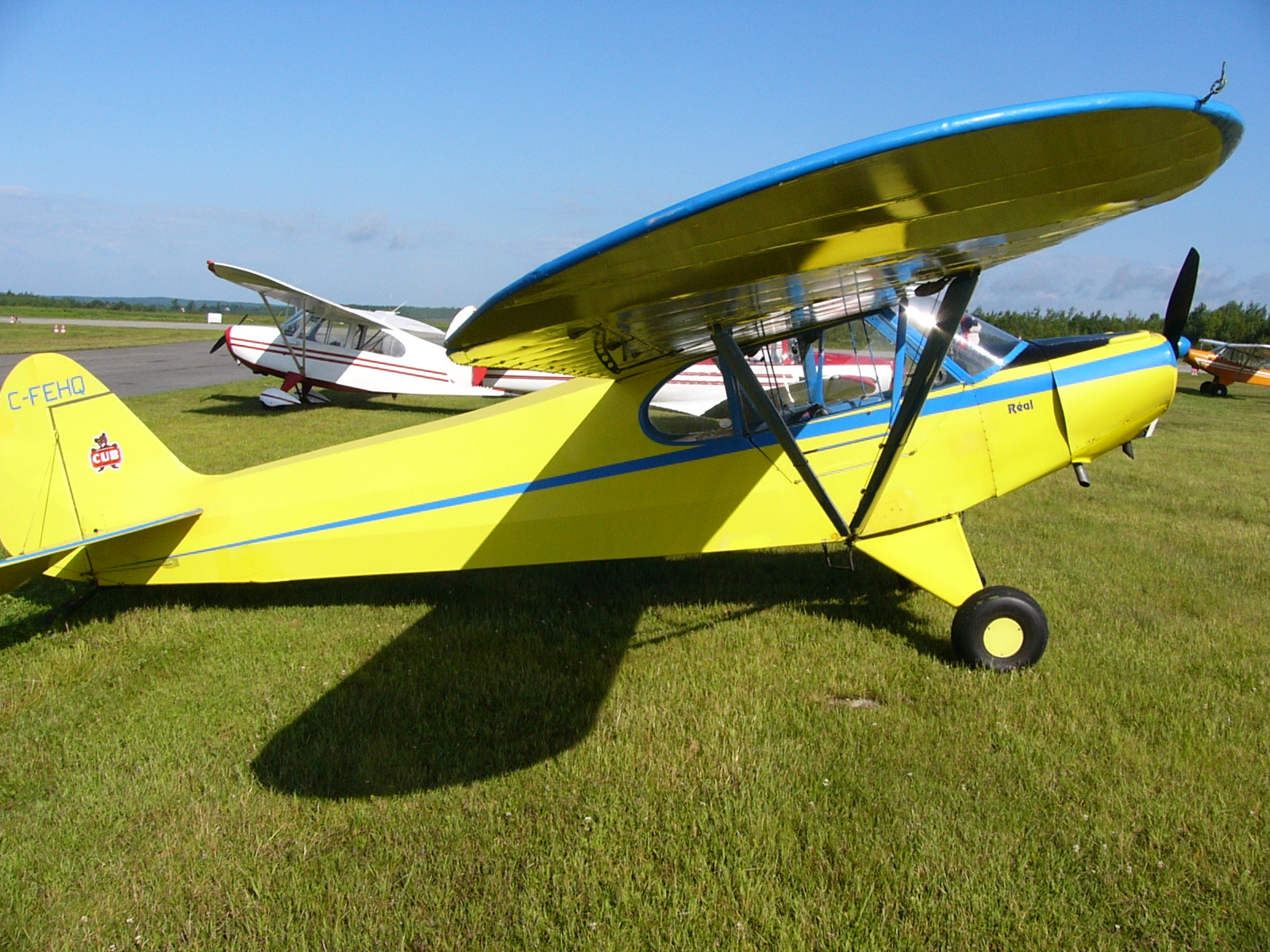
Wag-Aero CUBy

Data from Sport Aviation, Plane & Pilot and Purdy

General characteristics

- Crew: one
- Capacity: one passenger in tandem seating
- Length: 22 ft 5 in (6.83 m)
- Wingspan: 35 ft 3 in (10.74 m)
- Height: 6 ft 8 in (2.03 m)
- Wing area: 178.5 sq ft (16.58 m^{2})
- Airfoil: USA 35B
- Empty weight: 695 lb (315 kg)
- Gross weight: 1,400 lb (635 kg)
- Fuel capacity: 12 US Gallons, 45.42 litres
- Powerplant: 1 × Lycoming O-235 , 125 hp (93 kW)

Performance

- Maximum speed: 102 mph (164 km/h, 89 kn)
- Cruise speed: 94 mph (151 km/h, 82 kn)
- Stall speed: 39 mph (63 km/h, 34 kn)
- Range: 220 mi (350 km, 190 nmi) , 455 miles (396 nmi; 732 km) with 26 US gallon (98 litre) auxiliary tank
- Service ceiling: 11,200 ft (3,400 m)
- Rate of climb: 490 ft/min (2.5 m/s)

== See also ==
Aircraft of comparable role, configuration, and era

- Christavia Mk I
