= J & J Ultralights Seawing =

American ultralight trike

Seawing

General information
- Type: Amphibious ultralight trike
- National origin: United States
- Manufacturer: J & J Ultralights
- Status: Production completed
- Number built: 2 (February 2005)

The J & J Ultralights Seawing is an American amphibious ultralight trike that was designed and produced by J & J Ultralights of Live Oak, Florida. The aircraft was supplied as a kit for amateur construction or as a complete aircraft.

J & J Ultralights is no longer in business and the design out of production.

== Design and development ==
When equipped with two seats, the Seawing complies with the Fédération Aéronautique Internationale microlight category, including the category's maximum gross weight of 450 kg (992 lb). The aircraft has a maximum gross weight of 363 kg (800 lb). In its single-seat configuration and when equipped with a lightweight engine, it complies with the US FAR 103 Ultralight Vehicles rules, including the category's maximum empty weight of 254 lb (115 kg). It features a cable-braced hang glider-style high wing, weight-shift controls, a single-seat or two-seats-in-tandem open cockpit, floats and retractable tricycle landing gear and a single engine in pusher configuration.

The aircraft is made from bolted-together anodized 6061-T6 aluminum and 4130 steel tubing, with its single-surface wing covered in Dacron sailcloth. Its 35 ft (10.7 m) span wing is supported by a single tube-type kingpost and uses an "A" frame control bar. Buoyancy is provided by two Full Lotus inflatable floats. The wheels retract above the floats for water operations and in ground operations the nosewheel is fully steerable. The wing uses a unique hand crank mechanism to fold the wing in place on the frame and then to fold it down for storage or ground transportation.

The standard factory-supplied engine was the twin-cylinder, two-stroke, air-cooled Rotax 503 of 50 hp (37 kW), with the liquid-cooled Rotax 582 of 64 hp (48 kW) as an option. Standard fuel capacity is 5 U.S. gallons (19 L; 4.2 imp gal) with an additional tank available for optional installation to bring total capacity to 10 U.S. gallons (38 L; 8.3 imp gal).

Two examples had been completed and flown by February 2005, when the price was listed as US$16,500.

== Specifications (Seawing) ==
Data from Cliche and Kitplanes

General characteristics

- Crew: one
- Capacity: one passenger
- Length: 12 ft (3.7 m)
- Wingspan: 35 ft (11 m)
- Height: 10 ft (3.0 m)
- Wing area: 190 sq ft (18 m^{2})
- Empty weight: 350 lb (159 kg)
- Gross weight: 800 lb (363 kg)
- Fuel capacity: 5 U.S. gallons (19 L; 4.2 imp gal)
- Powerplant: 1 × Rotax 503 twin cylinder, two-stroke, air-cooled aircraft engine, 50 hp (37 kW)

Performance

- Maximum speed: 60 mph (97 km/h, 52 kn)
- Cruise speed: 35 mph (56 km/h, 30 kn)
- Stall speed: 25 mph (40 km/h, 22 kn)
- Range: 80 mi (130 km, 70 nmi)
- Rate of climb: 600 ft/min (3.0 m/s)

== See also ==
- J & J Ultralights
- J & J Ultralights Tukan
