= Raisner Graffiti =

American ultralight trike

Graffiti

General information
- Type: Ultralight trike
- National origin: United States
- Manufacturer: Raisner Aircraft Depot
- Designer: Bill Raisner
- Status: Production completed

History
- Introduction date: circa 1997

The Graffiti is an American ultralight trike that was designed by Bill Raisner and produced by Raisner Aircraft Depot, a division of Leading Edge Air Foils of Peyton, Colorado and introduced about 1997. When it was available the aircraft was supplied as a kit for amateur construction..

By 2004 the aircraft was no longer offered for sale by Leading Edge Air Foils.[4]

== Design and development ==
The Graffiti was designed with the goals of maximizing safety, performance and simplicity of construction. It was intended to comply with the US FAR 103 Ultralight Vehicles rules, as a two-seat trainer. It features a cable-braced hang glider-style high-wing, weight-shift controls, a two-seats-in-tandem open cockpit with a cockpit fairing, tricycle landing gear with wheel pants and a single engine in pusher configuration.

The aircraft is made from bolted-together aluminum tubing, with its double surface wing covered in Dacron sailcloth. Its 33.80 ft (10.3 m) span wing is supported by a single tube-type kingpost, uses an "A" frame weight-shift control bar and has a wing area of 160.0 sq ft (14.86 m^{2}). The acceptable power range is 41 to 64 hp (31 to 48 kW) and the standard powerplant used is a de-rated twin cylinder, air-cooled, two-stroke, dual-ignition 53 hp (40 kW) Rotax 582 engine, optimized for quiet operation.

The aircraft has an empty weight of 341 lb (155 kg) and a gross weight of 872 lb (396 kg), giving a useful load of 531 lb (241 kg).

The standard day, sea level, no wind, take off with a 53 hp (40 kW) engine is 100 ft (30 m) and the landing roll is 150 ft (46 m).

== Specifications (Graffiti) ==
Data from AeroCrafter

General characteristics

- Crew: one
- Capacity: one passenger
- Wingspan: 33.80 ft (10.30 m)
- Wing area: 160.0 sq ft (14.86 m^{2})
- Empty weight: 341 lb (155 kg)
- Gross weight: 872 lb (396 kg)
- Powerplant: 1 × Rotax 582 de-rated twin cylinder, liquid-cooled, two stroke aircraft engine, 53 hp (40 kW)
- Propellers: 4-bladed composite

Performance

- Maximum speed: 77 mph (124 km/h, 67 kn)
- Cruise speed: 56 mph (90 km/h, 49 kn)
- Stall speed: 31 mph (50 km/h, 27 kn)
- Range: 200 mi (320 km, 170 nmi)
- Service ceiling: 19,700 ft (6,000 m)
- Wing loading: 5.5 lb/sq ft (27 kg/m^{2})
