= Graffiti Junktion =

Florida restaurant chain

Graffiti Junktion, Inc.
- Company type: Independent company
- Industry: Restaurants
- Genre: Casual dining
- Area served: Florida, United States
- Parent: Independent (2008-present)
- Website: graffitijunktion.com

Graffiti Junktion is an American independent chain of restaurants located throughout Florida, USA, with 13 locations, since its founding in 2008. The restaurant contains the graffiti arts that drawn all over. The place serves American foods, such as burgers, hotdogs, chicken, etc. As of 2024, two locations remained in operation.
