= Piper PA-14 Family Cruiser =

Four-seat 1947 US light aircraft

PA-14 Family Cruiser
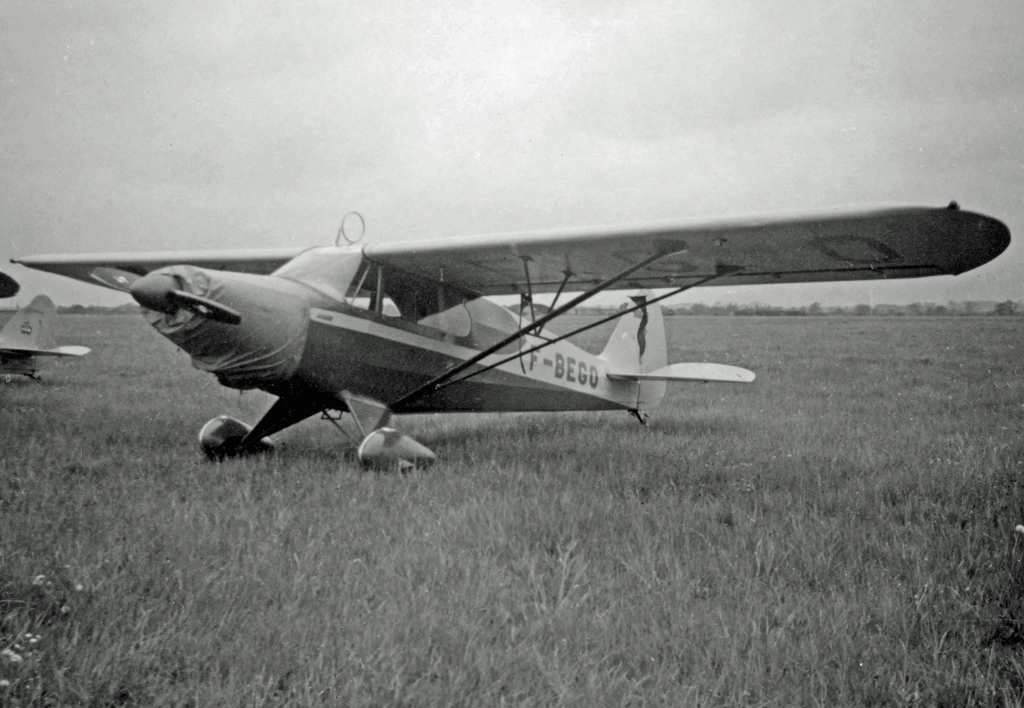
- French-registered PA-14 Family Cruiser at Sherburn-in-Elmet Airfield, Yorkshire in 1950

General information
- Type: Single-engined cabin monoplane
- National origin: United States
- Manufacturer: Piper Aircraft
- Number built: 238

History
- Manufactured: 1947–1949
- First flight: 21 March 1947
- Developed from: Piper PA-12 Super Cruiser

The Piper PA-14 Family Cruiser is an American-built small touring aircraft of the late 1940s.

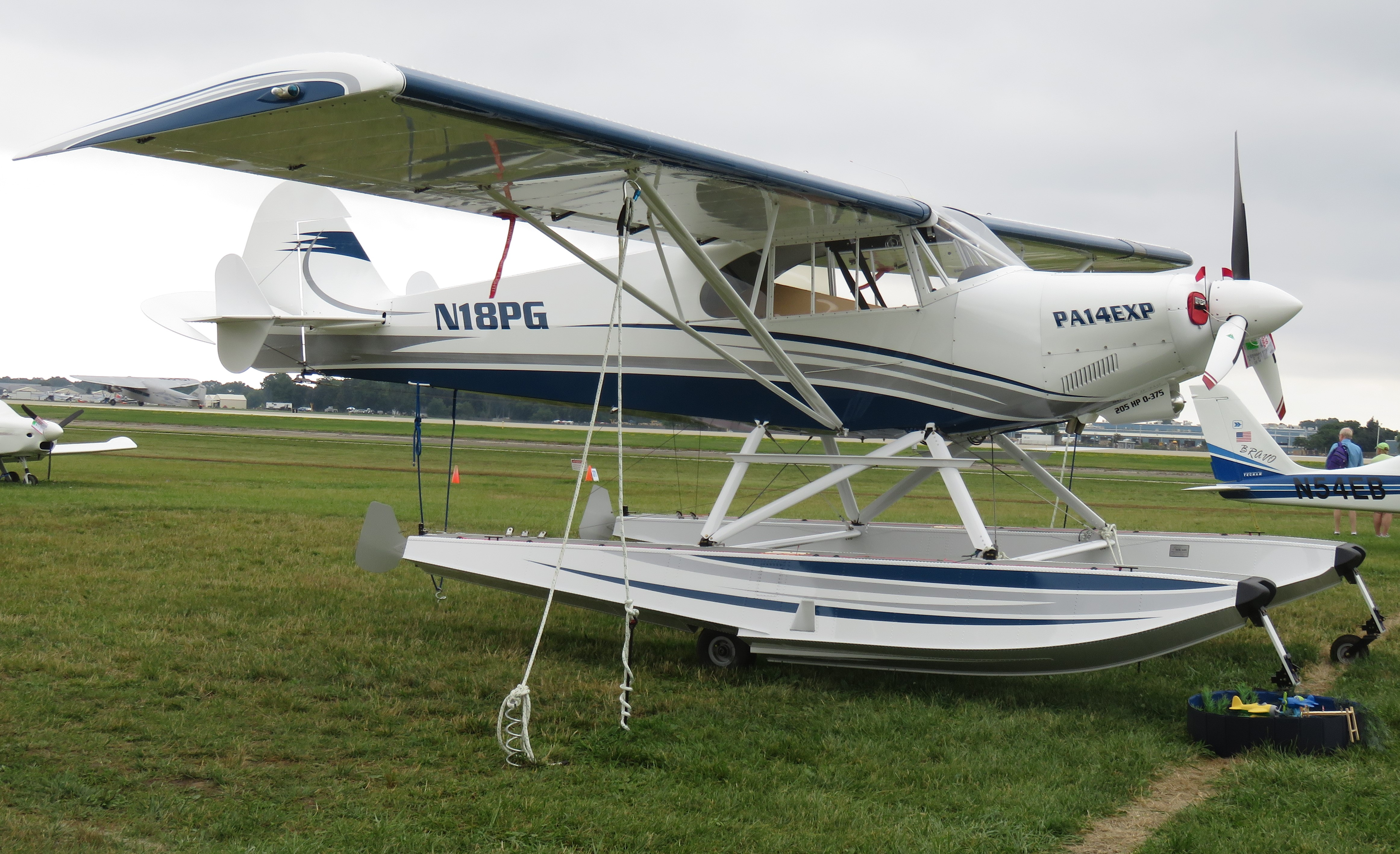
PA-14 experimental modification on amphibious floats

== Design and development ==
Piper Aircraft had built the PA-12 Super Cruiser three-seat touring aircraft between early 1946 and March 1948. In 1947, the PA-12 design was adapted to a four-seat layout by widening the cabin by five inches at the instrument panel and adding slotted flaps. The original high-wing and fixed tailwheel undercarriage layout features were retained. The PA-14 prototype made its first flight from the company's Lock Haven Pennsylvania factory on 21 March 1947.

== Production and operations ==
A second PA-14 was completed on 6 February 1948 and the first customer deliveries were made later that year. 238 examples were completed, most being sold to private owner pilots in the United States, but overseas sales included several to France. The aircraft was launched at a time of serious financial difficulty for the company, and indeed, soon after the release of the Family Cruiser, Piper was placed in receivership, from which it later successfully emerged. 126 examples remained registered in the United States in April 2011, of which 81 were based in Alaska and 13 aircraft were registered in Canada.

== Specifications ==
Data from Piper Aircraft and their forerunners

General characteristics

- Crew: 1
- Capacity: 3 passengers
- Length: 23 ft 2 in (7.06 m)
- Wingspan: 35 ft 6 in (10.82 m)
- Height: 6 ft 5 in (1.96 m)
- Wing area: 179.3 sq ft (16.66 m^{2})
- Airfoil: USA 35B
- Empty weight: 1,020 lb (463 kg)
- Max takeoff weight: 1,850 lb (839 kg)
- Powerplant: 1 × Lycoming O-235-C1 4-cylinder air-cooled horizontally-opposed piston engine, 115 hp (86 kW)
- Propellers: 2-bladed fixed-pitch propeller

Performance

- Maximum speed: 123 mph (198 km/h, 107 kn)
- Cruise speed: 110 mph (180 km/h, 96 kn)
- Stall speed: 44 mph (71 km/h, 38 kn) flaps down
- Range: 499 mi (803 km, 434 nmi)
- Rate of climb: 575 ft/min (2.92 m/s)
- Wing loading: 10.32 lb/sq ft (50.4 kg/m^{2})
- Power/mass: 0.062 hp/lb (0.102 kW/kg)

== See also ==
- Piper J-3

Related development

- Piper PA-12 Super Cruiser
- Piper PA-15 Vagabond

Aircraft of comparable role, configuration, and era

- Aeronca Sedan
- Wag-Aero CHUBy CUBy
