= Leading Edge Air Foils =

American aircraft parts supplier

Leading Edge Air Foils LLC
- Company type: Privately held company
- Industry: Aerospace
- Founded: 1980s
- Founder: Bill Raisner
- Headquarters: Lyons, Wisconsin, United States
- Products: Kit aircraft, aircraft parts, aircraft engines
- Owner: Bill Read and Mary Myers
- Parent: Wag-Aero
- Website: www.leadingedge-airfoils.com

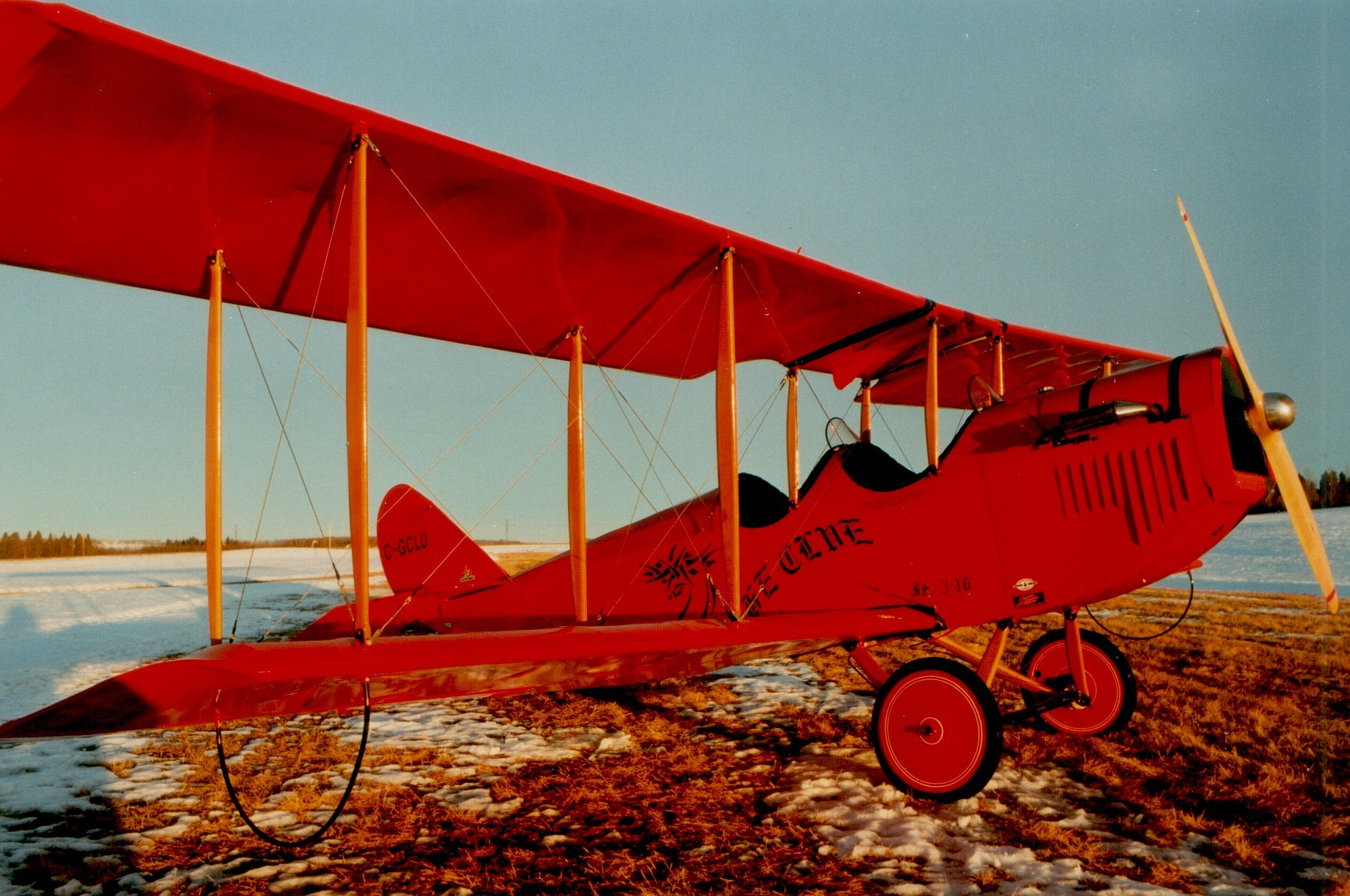
Early Bird Jenny

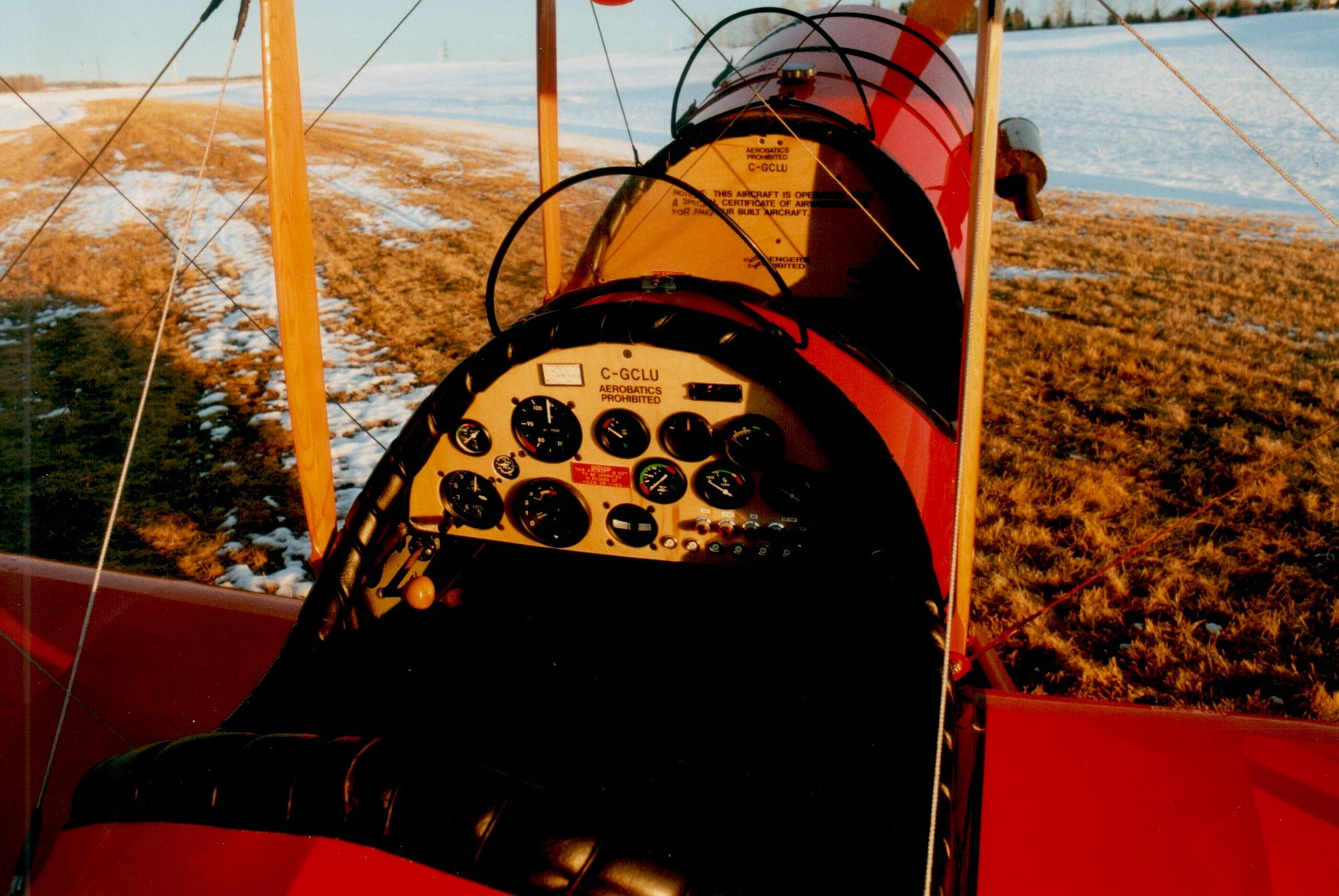
Early Bird Jenny instrument panel

Leading Edge Air Foils LLC (formerly Leading Edge Air Foils, Inc.), usually called LEAF, is an American aircraft parts supplier based in Lyons, Wisconsin. It is a US limited liability company.

The company was founded by Bill Raisner in Peyton, Colorado, in the 1980s and claims to be the oldest ultralight aircraft parts supplier. The company specializes in the provision of aircraft parts and aircraft engines and in the past supplied kit aircraft for amateur construction and ready-to-fly aircraft under the US FAR 103 Ultralight Vehicles rules.

The company is owned by Bill Read and Mary Myers and is part of the Wag-Aero group of companies. At one time a subsidiary, Raisner Aircraft Depot (RAD), sold the aircraft kits.

LEAF at one time offered kits and parts for other designer's aircraft, such as Dennis Wiley's Early Bird Jenny, Graham Lee's Circa Reproductions Nieuport, the J & J Ultralights Tukan and Antares MA-32 ultralight trikes, as well as two of Raisner's own designs, the Raisner Graffiti two seat trike and the LEAF Trike single seat trike. The company has long been a Rotax aircraft engine dealer and overhaul facility.

== Aircraft ==
Summary of aircraft built by LEAF
Model name	First flight	Number built	Type
Early Bird Jenny			Biplane kit aircraft
Circa Reproductions Nieuport			Biplane kit aircraft
J & J Ultralights Tukan			Two-seat ultralight trike
Antares MA-32		200 (as of 2005)	Two-seat ultralight trike
Raisner Graffiti	circa 1997		Two-seat ultralight trike
LEAF Trike	1980s		Single-seat ultralight trike
