= Antares MA-32 =

MA-32 series
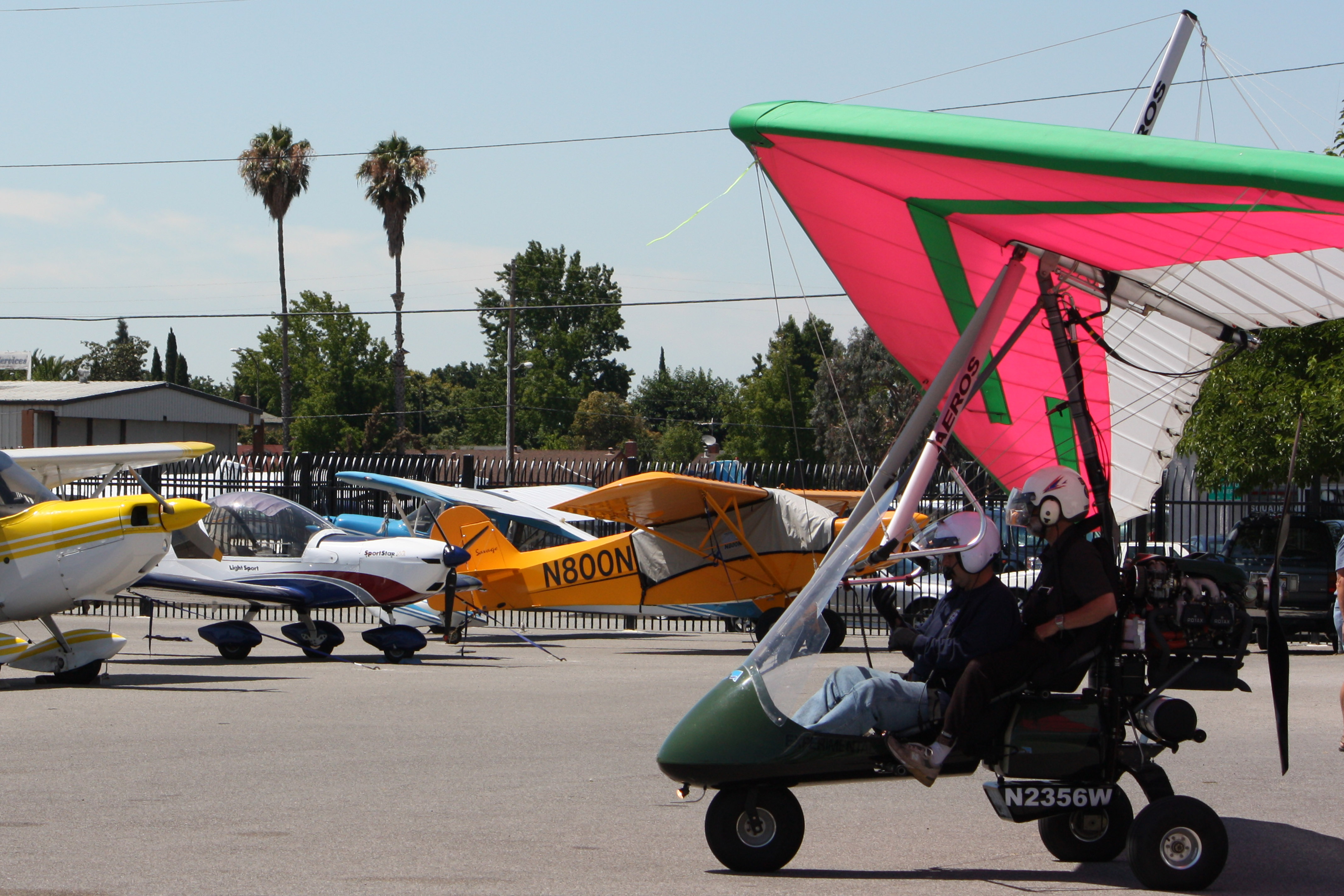
- Antares MA 34R 912 Ranger

General information
- Type: Ultralight trike
- National origin: Ukraine
- Manufacturer: Antares Aircraft
- Status: In production
- Number built: 200 (as of 2005)

History
- Variant: Antares A-10 Solo

The Antares MA-32 is the first model in a large family of Ukrainian ultralight trikes that is designed and produced by Antares Aircraft and at one time marketed by Leading Edge Air Foils as the LEAF Antares. The aircraft are supplied as kits for amateur construction.

== Design and development ==
The MA-32 is a two-seat design that was originally developed for European microlight competition flying. The aircraft has a standard empty weight of 321 lb (146 kg). It features a cable-braced hang glider-style high-wing, weight-shift controls, an open cockpit, tricycle landing gear and a single engine in pusher configuration.

The aircraft is made from bolted-together aluminum tubing, with titanium used on the carriage structure and wing attachment. The wing is covered in Dacron sailcloth. Its 33.8 ft (10.3 m) span wing is supported by a single tube-type kingpost and uses an "A" frame control bar. A number of single or double surface purpose-designed trike wings are optional, including the Aeros Still-17, Aeros Stream-16, Aeros Stranger 2, Aeros Profi, Aerossa Sprinter-15, Aerossa Stratos and the Aerossa Stratos-13. The landing gear uses a unique curved, slab-sided, main gear leg design made from fiberglass that reduces aerodynamic drag. All wheels have suspension and the steerable nose wheel also features a drum brake. A fiberglass cockpit fairing is optional. Series engines include the Rotax 447 two-stroke powerplant of 40 hp (30 kW), Rotax 503 of 50 hp (37 kW), the liquid-cooled Rotax 582 of 64 hp (48 kW), the Rotax 912 and 912S four-stroke powerplants of 80 hp (60 kW) and 100 hp (75 kW) and the HKS 700E of 60 hp (45 kW).

The aircraft can all be quickly folded for storage or ground transportation.

== Variants ==
A-10 R503 Solo
Base single-seat model with Rotax 503 of 50 hp (37 kW) and gross weight of 450 kg (992 lb). The model has the same undercarriage and other features of the MA-32. Wings that can be fitted include the Aero Stranger 2, Aeros Stranger 2M, Aeros Still 17, Aeros Stream 16 or the Aeros Profi.
MA-32
Base two-seat model with Rotax 447 two-stroke powerplant of 40 hp (30 kW)
MA-32 R503
Two-seat model with Rotax 503 of 50 hp (37 kW)
MA-32 R582 G
Two-seat model with Rotax 582 of 64 hp (48 kW), with optional twin floats
MA-33 and MA-33M R582
Two-seat model with Rotax 582 two-stroke powerplant of 64 hp (48 kW)
MA-33M R912
Two-seat model with Rotax 912 four-stroke powerplant of 80 hp (60 kW) or HKS 700E of 60 hp (45 kW)
MA-34 R912 Ranger
Two-seat model with Rotax 912 four-stroke powerplant of 80 hp (60 kW) and a 15 U.S. gallons (57 L; 12 imp gal) fuel tank
MA-34R912S Beaver
Two-seat model with Rotax 912ULS four-stroke powerplant of 100 hp (75 kW)
MA-34 Open Country
Two-seat model with Rotax 912ULS four-stroke powerplant of 100 hp (75 kW), tundra tires and an Aeros Stratos 15.5 wing
MA-34 R582XB Crop Duster
Two-seat model with Rotax 582 two-stroke powerplant of 64 hp (48 kW) and spray equipment for aerial application
LEAF Antares 503
Base model marketed by Leading Edge Air Foils, with the Aeros Stream-16 wing, circa 2000. Two-seat model with Rotax 503 of 50 hp (37 kW)
LEAF Antares 582
Model marketed by Leading Edge Air Foils, with the Aeros Stranger-15 wing, circa 2000. Two-seat model with Rotax 582 of 64 hp (48 kW)

== Specifications (MA-32) ==
Data from Cliche

General characteristics

- Crew: one
- Capacity: one passenger
- Wingspan: 10.3 m (33.8 ft)
- Wing area: 15.5 m^{2} (167 sq ft)
- Empty weight: 146 kg (321 lb)
- Gross weight: 250 kg (551 lb)
- Fuel capacity: 19 litres (4.2 imp gal; 5.0 US gal)
- Powerplant: 1 × Rotax 447 twin cylinder, two-stroke aircraft engine, 30 kW (40 hp)
- Propellers: 6-bladed composite

Performance

- Maximum speed: 124 km/h (77 mph, 67 kn)
- Cruise speed: 64 km/h (40 mph, 35 kn)
- Stall speed: 45 km/h (28 mph, 24 kn)
- Range: 320 km (200 mi, 170 nmi)
- Service ceiling: 6,000 m (19,700 ft)
