= Apollo Racer GT =

Hungarian ultralight trike

Racer GT

General information
- Type: Ultralight trike
- National origin: Hungary
- Manufacturer: Apollo Ultralight Aircraft
- Status: In production (2013)

The Apollo Racer GT is a Hungarian ultralight trike, designed and produced by Apollo Ultralight Aircraft of Eger. The aircraft is supplied as a kit for amateur construction or as a complete ready-to-fly-aircraft.

== Design and development ==
The Racer GT is a simplified and lighter derivative of the Apollo Jet Star, with a simplified cockpit fairing and no engine cowling. It was designed to comply with the Fédération Aéronautique Internationale microlight category. It features a cable-braced hang glider-style high-wing, weight-shift controls, a two-seats-in-tandem, open cockpit, tricycle landing gear with wheel pants and a single engine in pusher configuration. The main landing gear uses strut-type suspension, rather than the leaf-type suspension used on the Apollo Delta Jet series. A nose wheel brake is standard equipment.

The aircraft is made from bolted-together aluminum tubing, with its double surface wing covered in Dacron sailcloth. The aircraft uses an "A" frame weight-shift control bar. The powerplant options include the twin cylinder, liquid-cooled, two-stroke, dual-ignition 64 hp (48 kW) Rotax 582 engine and the four cylinder, air and liquid-cooled, four-stroke, dual-ignition 80 hp (60 kW) Rotax 912 engine.

The aircraft has an empty weight of 140 kg (309 lb) and a gross weight of 430 kg (948 lb), giving a useful load of 290 kg (639 lb). With full fuel of 55 litres (12 imp gal; 15 US gal) the payload is 250 kg (551 lb).

A number of different Apollo wings can be fitted to the basic carriage, including the C-15, C-15TN, C-17 and CXMD. Te Racer GT is the only aircraft built by Apollo that is approved to be fitted with floats. Optional equipment includes instructor training pedals, a hang glider towing system, ballistic parachute, windshield and main wheel brakes .

== Specifications (Racer GT) ==
Data from Bayerl

General characteristics

- Crew: one
- Capacity: one passenger
- Wingspan: 10 m (32 ft 10 in)
- Wing area: 15 m^{2} (160 sq ft)
- Empty weight: 140 kg (309 lb)
- Gross weight: 430 kg (948 lb)
- Fuel capacity: 55 litres (12 imp gal; 15 US gal)
- Powerplant: 1 × Rotax 582 two cylinder, liquid-cooled, two stroke aircraft engine, 48 kW (64 hp)
- Propellers: 3-bladed composite

Performance

- Maximum speed: 140 km/h (87 mph, 76 kn)
- Cruise speed: 100 km/h (62 mph, 54 kn)
- Stall speed: 55 km/h (34 mph, 30 kn)
- Rate of climb: 4 m/s (790 ft/min)
- Wing loading: 28.7 kg/m^{2} (5.9 lb/sq ft)
