= Antares A-10 Solo =

Ukrainian ultralight trike

A-10 Solo

General information
- Type: Ultralight trike
- National origin: Ukraine
- Manufacturer: Antares Aircraft
- Status: In production (2018)

History
- Developed from: Antares MA-32

The Antares A-10 Solo is a Ukrainian ultralight trike designed and produced by Antares Aircraft. The aircraft is supplied as a kit for amateur construction or complete and ready-to-fly.

== Design and development ==
The A-10 Solo is a single-seat derivative of the two-seat Antares MA-32. It was designed to comply with the Fédération Aéronautique Internationale microlight category, including the category's maximum gross weight of 450 kg (992 lb). The aircraft has a maximum gross weight of 450 kg (992 lb). The A-10 is distributed as a kit in the United States where it is approved for the Experimental - Amateur-built category.

The aircraft design features a cable-braced hang glider-style high-wing, weight-shift controls, a single-seat open cockpit with a cockpit fairing, tricycle landing gear with wheel pants and a single engine in pusher configuration.

The aircraft is made from bolted-together aluminum tubing, with a single-piece composite mainwheel spring system and a titanium front wheel fork for off-airport landings. The double surface wing covered in Dacron sailcloth. Its 10 m (32.8 ft) span wing is supported by a single tube-type kingpost and uses an "A" frame weight-shift control bar. Optionally a "topless" wing, lacking the kingpost, can be fitted. The powerplant is a twin cylinder, air-cooled, two-stroke, dual-ignition 50 hp (37 kW) Rotax 503 engine or optionally a 40 hp (30 kW) Rotax 447 engine.

The aircraft has an empty weight of 170 kg (375 lb) and a gross weight of 450 kg (992 lb), giving a useful load of 280 kg (617 lb). With full fuel of 19 litres (4.2 imp gal; 5.0 US gal) the payload is 266 kg (586 lb).

A number of different wings can be fitted to the basic carriage, including the standard Aeros Stranger 2, or Aeros Still 17. Optional wings include the Aeros Stranger 2M, Aeros Stream 16 or Aeros Profi

== Specifications (A-10 Solo) ==
Data from Tacke and Antares USA

General characteristics

- Crew: one
- Length: 2.51 m (8 ft 3 in)
- Wingspan: 10 m (32 ft 10 in)
- Wing area: 14 m^{2} (150 sq ft)
- Empty weight: 170 kg (375 lb)
- Gross weight: 450 kg (992 lb)
- Fuel capacity: 19 litres (4.2 imp gal; 5.0 US gal)
- Powerplant: 1 × Rotax 503 twin cylinder, air-cooled, two stroke aircraft engine with "E" gearbox with a reduction ratio of 2.62:1, 37 kW (50 hp)
- Propellers: 3-bladed ground adjustable

Performance

- Maximum speed: 140 km/h (87 mph, 76 kn)
- Cruise speed: 83 km/h (52 mph, 45 kn)
- Stall speed: 43 km/h (27 mph, 23 kn)
- Service ceiling: 6,200 m (20,300 ft)
- g limits: +6/-2
- Rate of climb: 5 m/s (980 ft/min)
