= Aeros del Sur Manta =

Manta

General information
- Type: Ultralight trike
- National origin: Argentina
- Manufacturer: Aeros del Sur
- Status: In production (2013)

The Aeros del Sur Manta is an Argentine ultralight trike, designed and produced by Aeros del Sur. The aircraft is supplied as a complete ready-to-fly-aircraft.

== Design and development ==
Aeros del Sur is the importer of Aeros products for Argentina. The Manta was designed by mating the Aeros Profi trike wing with a new, locally designed carriage. The Manta was designed to comply with the Fédération Aéronautique Internationale microlight category, including the category's maximum gross weight of 472.5 kg (1,042 lb), with a ballistic parachute. The Manta has a maximum gross weight of 472.5 kg (1,042 lb). It features a cable-braced hang glider-style high-wing, weight-shift controls, a two-seats-in-tandem, open cockpit, tricycle landing gear with wheel pants and a single engine in pusher configuration.

The aircraft is made from a mix of bolted-together aluminium and steel tubing, with its double surface wing covered in Dacron sailcloth. Its 10 m (32.8 ft) span wing is supported by a single tube-type kingpost and uses an "A" frame weight-shift control bar. The standard powerplant is a twin cylinder, liquid-cooled, two-stroke, dual-ignition 64 hp (48 kW) Rotax 582 engine, but the HKS 700E four-stroke, dual-ignition 60 hp (45 kW) engine is optional, as are Hirth and Simonini powerplants.

== Specifications (Manta) ==
Data from Bayerl

General characteristics

- Crew: one
- Capacity: one passenger
- Wingspan: 10 m (32 ft 10 in)
- Wing area: 15.4 m^{2} (166 sq ft)
- Gross weight: 472.5 kg (1,042 lb)
- Fuel capacity: 50 litres (11 imp gal; 13 US gal)
- Powerplant: 1 × Rotax 582 two cylinder, liquid-cooled, two stroke aircraft engine, 48 kW (64 hp)
- Propellers: 3-bladed composite

Performance

- Wing loading: 30.68 kg/m^{2} (6.28 lb/sq ft)
