= M25 =

M25 or M-25 may be:

== Aerospace ==
- M-25 Dromader Mikro, a variant of the Polish PZL-Mielec M-18 Dromader agricultural aircraft
- Cors-Air M25Y Black Devil, an Italian aircraft engine
- Shvetsov M-25, an aircraft radial engine produced in the Soviet Union (USSR) in the 1930s and 1940s

== Vehicles ==
- M25 tank transporter, a US Army World War II tractor-trailer combination used for transporting/recovering tanks
- M25 (tram), a class of tram used in Gothenburg, in Sweden, and Oslo, in Norway
- M25, the engine of the Mercedes-Benz W25 GP race car (1934–1936)
- M25, a Nissan-based car by Tommy Kaira
- McLaren M25, a racing car

== People ==
- M25 cat killer, alleged killer of 50+ cats in the Croydon, England area

== Roads ==
- M-25 (Michigan highway), a road connecting Port Huron and Bay City
- M25 highway (Russia), a federal road in Russia that connects Novorossiysk with the ferry at Simferopol to Crimea
- M25 (East London), a Metropolitan Route in East London, South Africa
- M25 (Cape Town), a Metropolitan Route in Cape Town, South Africa
- M25 (Pretoria), a Metropolitan Route in Pretoria, South Africa
- M25 (Durban), a Metropolitan Route near Durban, South Africa
- M25 motorway, orbital road around Greater London
- M25 expressway (Hungary), an expressway in Hungary

== Space ==
- Messier 25, an open star cluster in the constellation Sagittarius

== Vessels ==
- HMS M25, a British warship launched in 1915 and scuttled in 1919
- Mälar 25, sailboat class
- Miles M.25 Martinet, a 1942 target tug aircraft of the Royal Air Force

== Weapons ==
- M25 sniper rifle, a sniper rifle
- M25A1 grenade, a U.S. riot control hand grenade
- XM25 CDTE, an airburst grenade launcher

== See also ==
- Model 25 (disambiguation)
