= List of Ukrainian gliders =

This is a list of gliders/sailplanes of the world, (this reference lists all gliders with references, where available) Note: Any aircraft can glide for a short time, but gliders are designed to glide for longer.

== Ukrainian miscellaneous constructors ==
- Aerola AL-12
- Aerola AL-12M
- Aerola Alatus
- Aerola Alatus-M
