= AG1 =

AG1 and AG-1 may refer to:

- AG1 (company), an American company
- Apollo Gyro AG1, a Hungarian autogyro
- Christopher AG-1, a proposed Second World War American assault glider
- Hispasat AG1, a Spanish communications satellite
- Texas A&M College Ag-1, a prototype single seat, single engine aircraft
