= Aeros Cross Country =

Ukrainian ultralight trike

Cross Country

General information
- Type: Ultralight trike
- National origin: Ukraine
- Manufacturer: Aeros
- Status: In production

The Aeros Cross Country, sometimes called the Aeros Cross-Country, is a Ukrainian ultralight trike, designed and produced by Aeros of Kyiv. The aircraft is supplied as a complete ready-to-fly aircraft or as kit for amateur construction.

== Design and development ==
Intended as a more basic model than the Aeros-2 for off-airport use, the Cross Country features a cable-braced hang glider-style high-wing, weight-shift controls, a two-seats-in-tandem open cockpit, tricycle landing gear and a single engine in pusher configuration.

The aircraft is made from tubing, with its wing covered in Dacron sailcloth. Its 10.3 m (33.8 ft) span wing is supported by a single tube-type kingpost and uses an "A" frame control bar. Unlike the Aeros-2 the Cross Country does not have a cockpit fairing and sports heavy duty main wheel suspension for rough fields.

Engines available include the twin cylinder, two-stroke, air-cooled 50 hp (37 kW) Rotax 503, the liquid-cooled 64 hp (48 kW) Rotax 582, the four cylinder four-stroke 80 hp (60 kW) Rotax 912UL and 100 hp (75 kW) 912ULS or the certified 912A or S. The BMW K-1100 ULS powerplant is also optional. Available wings to be mated to the carriage are the Aeros Profi, Aeros Stranger, Aeros Stream and Aeros Still.

An aerial application kit to allow crop spraying was available as an option.

== Specifications (Cross Country 912) ==
Data from Aeros

General characteristics

- Crew: one
- Capacity: one passenger
- Wing area: 14.5 m^{2} (156 sq ft)
- Empty weight: 222 kg (489 lb)
- Gross weight: 472.5 kg (1,042 lb)
- Fuel capacity: 53 litres (12 imp gal; 14 US gal)
- Powerplant: 1 × Rotax 912UL four cylinder, four stroke aircraft engine, 60 kW (80 hp)

Performance

- Cruise speed: 90 km/h (56 mph, 49 kn)
- Stall speed: 52 km/h (32 mph, 28 kn)
- Never exceed speed: 130 km/h (81 mph, 70 kn)
- Service ceiling: 3,500 m (11,500 ft)
- g limits: +4/-2
- Maximum glide ratio: 5:1
- Rate of climb: 5 m/s (980 ft/min) at 450 kg take-off weight
