= Powrachute =

Powrachute, LLC
- Type: Privately held company
- Industry: Aerospace
- Founded: January 1999
- Founder: Bill Amyx
- Headquarters: Hastings, Michigan, United States
- Key people: Owners since 2005 - Jeff and Deb Williams
- Products: Powered parachutes
- Website: www.powrachute.com

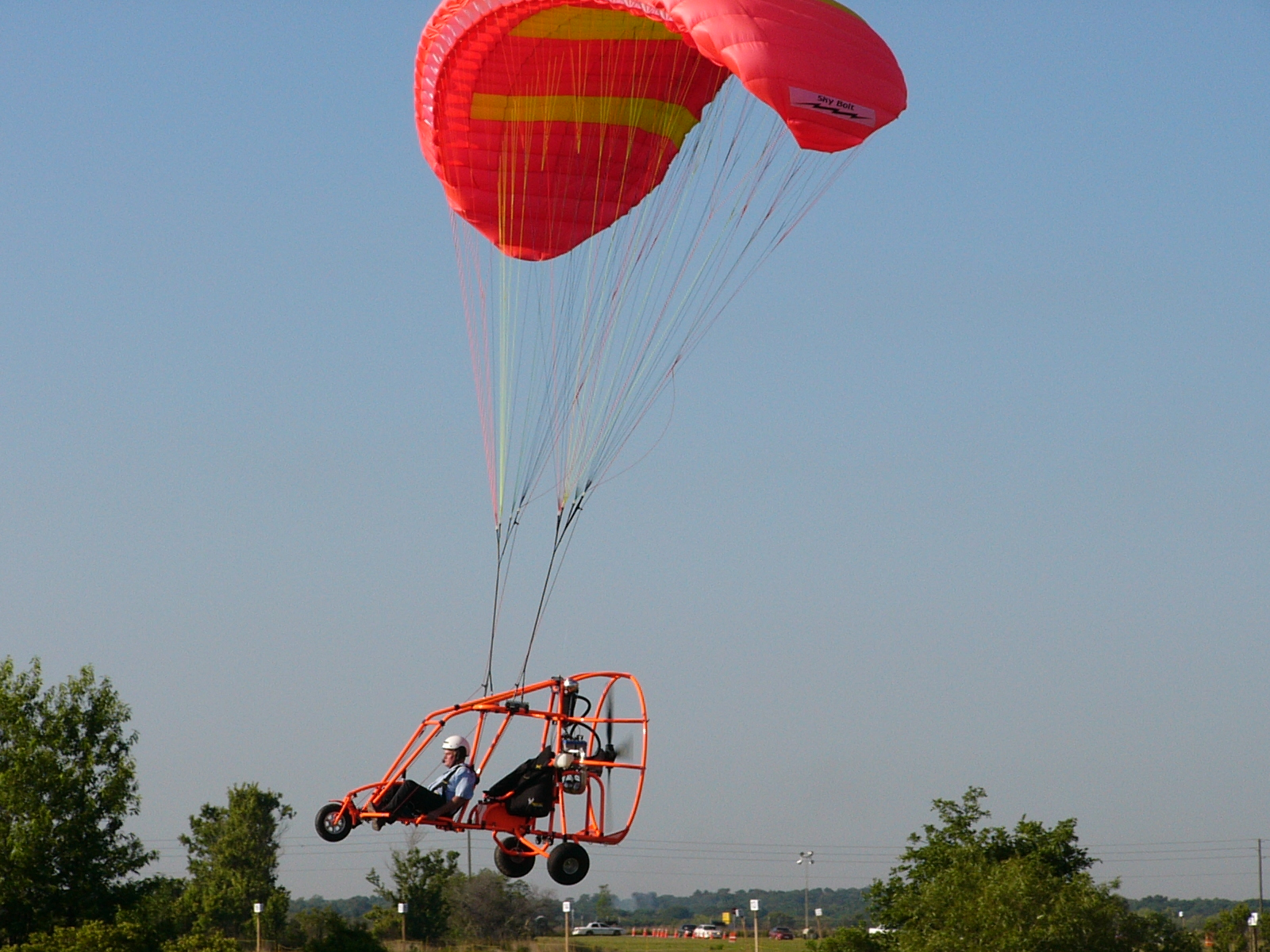
Powrachute Pegasus powered parachute in flight

Powrachute, LLC is an American aircraft manufacturer, based in Hastings, Michigan. The company specializes in the design and production of powered parachutes.

The company was formed in January 1999 in Columbus, Kansas by Bill Amyx. He retired in 2005 and sold the company to Jeff and Deb Williams who relocated it to Middleville, Michigan, then later moved the operation to Hastings, Michigan.

The company also builds the Evolution Revo ultralight trike under contract.

== Aircraft ==
Summary of aircraft built by Powrachute
Model name	First flight	Number built	Type
Powrachute 912 Airwolf			powered parachute
Powrachute PC 2000			powered parachute
Powrachute Pegasus		360 (by 2005)	powered parachute
Powrachute Sky Rascal			powered parachute
Powrachute Voyager			powered parachute
