= Exkluziv Joker =

Slovak ultralight trike

Joker

General information
- Type: Ultralight trike
- National origin: Slovakia
- Manufacturer: Exkluziv sro
- Designer: Jindrich Zahumensky
- Status: In production (2013)

The Exkluziv Joker is a Slovak ultralight trike that was designed by Jindrich Zahumensky and produced by Exkluziv sro of Topoľčany. The aircraft is supplied as a complete ready-to-fly-aircraft.

== Design and development ==
Zahumensky intended the Joker as a clean-sheet attempt to rethink how ultralight trikes are designed, including styling and pilot seating. The resulting aircraft was designed to comply with the Fédération Aéronautique Internationale microlight category, including the category's maximum gross weight of 450 kg (992 lb). The aircraft has a maximum gross weight of 450 kg (992 lb). It features a strut-braced hang glider-style high-wing with electric trim, weight-shift controls, a two-seats-in-tandem open cockpit with a non-structural fibreglass cockpit fairing, tricycle landing gear with wheel pants and a single engine in pusher configuration.

The aircraft is made from bolted-together aluminum tubing, with its double surface wing covered in Dacron sailcloth. The Bautek Pico S "topless" wing has a span of 12.2 m (40.0 ft), is supported by struts and uses an "A" frame weight-shift control bar. The powerplant is a four-cylinder, air and liquid-cooled, four-stroke, dual-ignition 80 hp (60 kW) Rotax 912S engine or a twin cylinder, air-cooled, two-stroke, dual-ignition 55 hp (41 kW) Hirth 2703 engine.

The aircraft has an empty weight of 219 kg (483 lb) and a gross weight of 450 kg (992 lb), giving a useful load of 231 kg (509 lb). With full fuel of 50 litres (11 imp gal; 13 US gal) the payload is 195 kg (430 lb).

A number of different strut-braced wings can be fitted to the basic carriage, including the Bautek Pico S and the Aeros Profi TL.

== Specifications (Joker with Bautek Pico S wing) ==
Data from Bayerl

General characteristics

- Crew: one
- Capacity: one passenger
- Wingspan: 12.2 m (40 ft 0 in)
- Wing area: 9.5 m^{2} (102 sq ft)
- Empty weight: 219 kg (483 lb)
- Gross weight: 450 kg (992 lb)
- Fuel capacity: 50 litres (11 imp gal; 13 US gal)
- Powerplant: 1 × Rotax 912UL four cylinder, liquid and air-cooled, four stroke aircraft engine, 60 kW (80 hp)
- Propellers: 3-bladed composite

Performance

- Maximum speed: 150 km/h (93 mph, 81 kn)
- Cruise speed: 120 km/h (75 mph, 65 kn)
- Stall speed: 60 km/h (37 mph, 32 kn)
- Rate of climb: 5 m/s (980 ft/min)
- Wing loading: 47.4 kg/m^{2} (9.7 lb/sq ft)
