= Aeros =

- Company type: Private company
- Industry: Aerospace
- Headquarters: Kyiv, Ukraine
- Products: Hang gliders, paragliders, ultralight trikes, trike wings, ultralight aircraft, sailplanes
- Website: aeros.com.ua

Aeros is a Ukrainian aircraft manufacturer founded by a group of ex-Antonov engineers in the early 1990s to build hang gliders. It is located in Kyiv.

The firm manufactures and distributes the French Best Off Sky Ranger ultralight under licence.

In the 2010s the company introduced a nanotrike, a lightweight, simple folding ultralight trike design, called the Aeros ANT, that can be packed into a carrying case.

== Aircraft ==
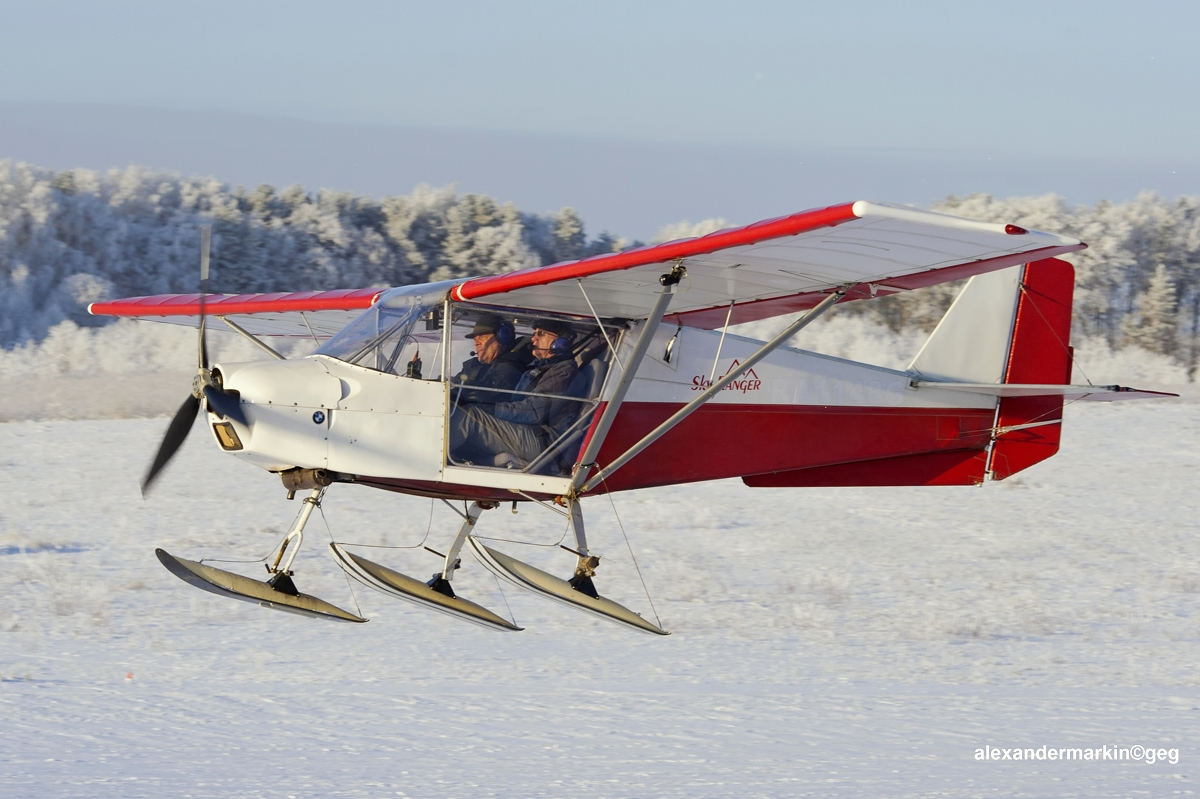
Aeros Sky Ranger

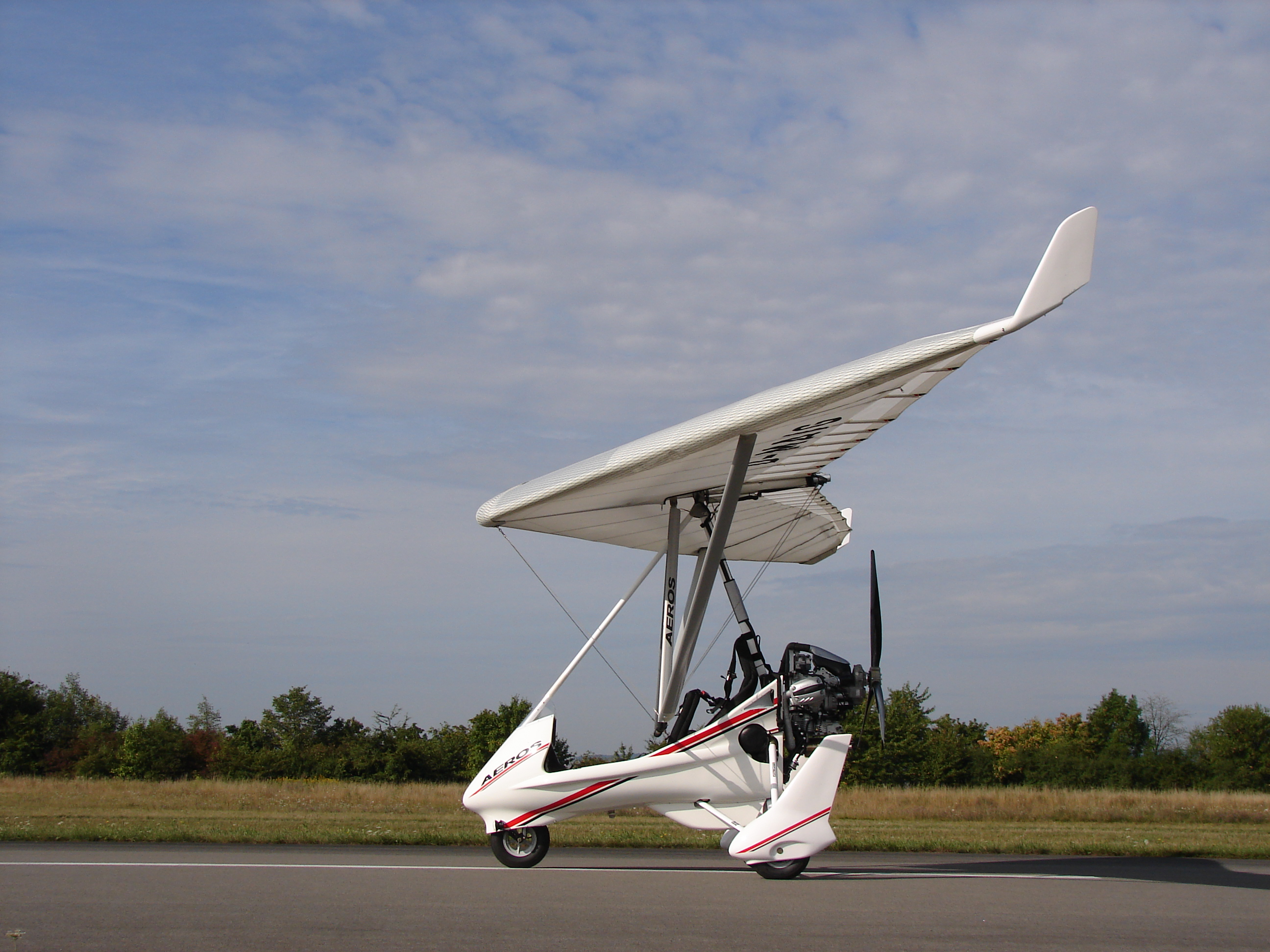
Aeros-2

- Aeros-1
- Aeros-2
- Aeros AC-21
- Aeros AL-12
- Aeros Accent
- Aeros Amigo
- Aeros ANT
- Aeros Combat
- Aeros Cross Country
- Aeros Discus
- Aeros Fox
- Aeros Fuego
- Aeros Mister X
- Aeros Phaeton
- Aeros Rival
- Aeros Sky Ranger
- Aeros Stealth
- Aeros Stalker
- Aeros Target
- Aeros Style
- Aeros Virtuoso
- Aeros Vitamin
- Aeros Zig-Zag

== Wings ==
- Aeros Combat
- Aeros Discus T
- Aeros Fox T
- Aeros Profi
- Aeros Stranger
- Aeros Stream
- Aeros Still

== See also ==
- Aero Nord
