= Evolution Revo =

American ultralight trike

Revo
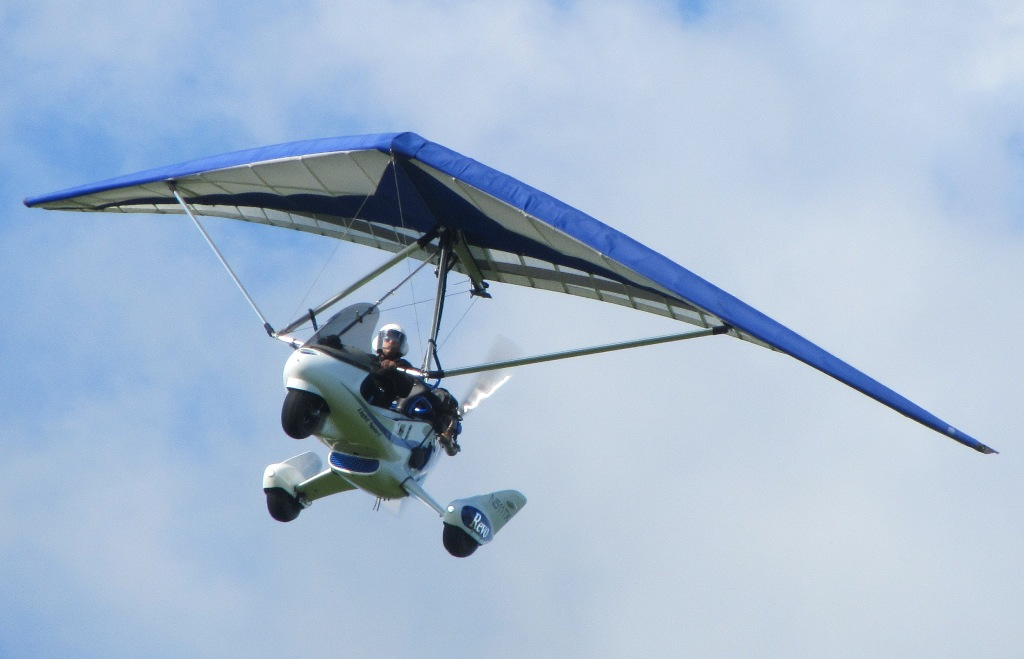

General information
- Type: Ultralight trike
- National origin: United States
- Manufacturer: Evolution Trikes
- Status: In production (2013)

History
- Developed from: Apollo Monsoon

The Evolution Revo is an American ultralight trike, designed by Evolution Trikes of Zephyrhills, Florida. The aircraft is supplied as a complete ready-to-fly-aircraft.

The Revo was derived from the Hungarian Apollo Monsoon and is built under sub-contract in the United States by Powrachute of Middleville, Michigan. It was designed specifically to compete with the British Pegasus Quik.

== Design and development ==
The Revo was designed to comply with the American light-sport aircraft category and has been accepted as an S-LSA.

The aircraft features a strut-braced hang glider-style high-wing, weight-shift controls, a two-seats-in-tandem open cockpit with a cockpit fairing, tricycle landing gear with wheel pants and a single engine in pusher configuration.

The Revo is made from welded steel tubing, with its double surface wing covered in Dacron sailcloth. Its 30 ft (9.1 m) span North Wing Reflex wing has no kingpost and uses an "A" frame weight-shift control bar. The powerplant is a four-cylinder, air and liquid-cooled, four-stroke, dual-ignition 100 hp (75 kW) Rotax 912ULS engine or 80 hp (60 kW) Rotax 912UL. The aircraft has an empty weight of 530 lb (240 kg) and a gross weight of 1,037 lb (470 kg), giving a useful load of 506 lb (230 kg). With full fuel of 15 U.S. gallons (57 L; 12 imp gal) the payload is 416 lb (189 kg).

A number of different wings can be fitted to the basic carriage, including the Reflex 11 and 13.

== Specifications (Revo) ==
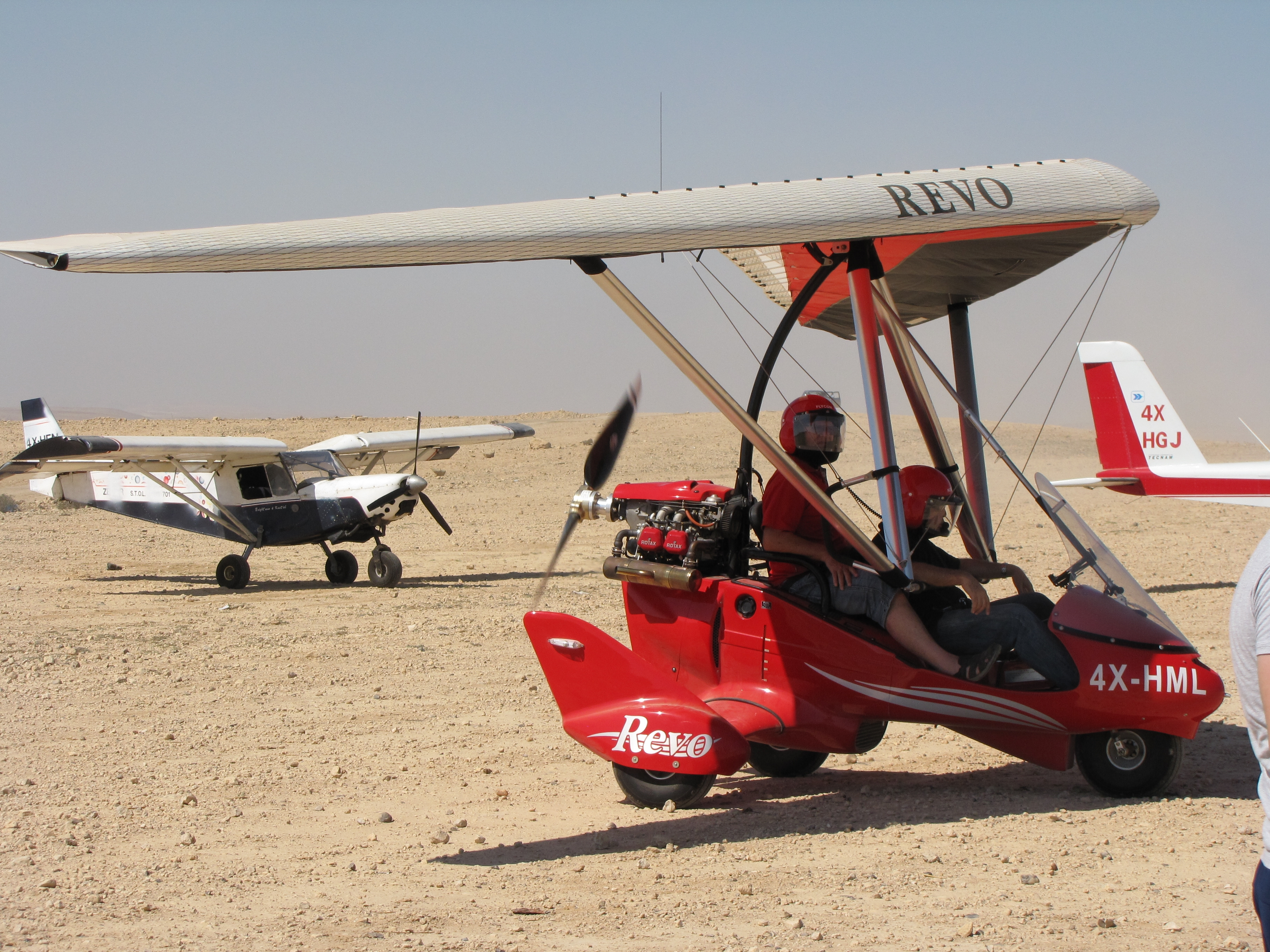
Evolution Revo

Data from Bayerl

General characteristics

- Crew: one
- Capacity: one passenger
- Wingspan: 30 ft 2 in (9.2 m)
- Wing area: 145 sq ft (13.5 m^{2})
- Empty weight: 529 lb (240 kg)
- Gross weight: 1,036 lb (470 kg)
- Fuel capacity: 15 U.S. gallons (57 L; 12 imp gal)
- Powerplant: 1 × Rotax 912ULS four cylinder, liquid and air-cooled, four stroke aircraft engine, 100 hp (75 kW)
- Propellers: 2 or 3-bladed composite

Performance

- Maximum speed: 62 mph (100 km/h, 54 kn)
- Cruise speed: 50 mph (80 km/h, 43 kn)
- Stall speed: 22 mph (35 km/h, 19 kn)
- Rate of climb: 1,140 ft/min (5.8 m/s)
- Wing loading: 7.1 lb/sq ft (34.8 kg/m^{2})
