= Electric Ride E-Bird =

German ultralight trike

E-Bird

General information
- Type: Ultralight trike
- National origin: Germany
- Manufacturer: Electric Ride GmbH
- Status: In production (2018)

History
- Developed from: Aeros ANT

The Electric Ride E-Bird is a German electric ultralight trike developed and produced by Electric Ride of Baierbrunn. The aircraft is supplied complete and ready-to-fly.

== Design and development ==
The E-Bird is an electric-powered development of the Aeros ANT. It was designed to comply with the Fédération Aéronautique Internationale microlight category, German 120 kg class and the US FAR 103 Ultralight Vehicles rules.

The aircraft design features a cable-braced hang glider-style high-wing, weight-shift controls, a single-seat open cockpit without a cockpit fairing, tricycle landing gear and a single electric motor in pusher configuration.

The aircraft is made from bolted-together aluminum tubing, with its double surface "topless" Aeros Combat wing covered in Dacron sailcloth. Its 10 m (32.8 ft) span wing uses an "A" frame weight-shift control bar. The powerplant is an electric motor rated at 16 kW (21 hp) for take-off and 12 kW (16 hp) continuous, powered by a 5.85 kWh battery. The maximum sound in flight is under 47 dB.

The aircraft has an empty weight of 106 kg (234 lb) and a gross weight of 194 kg (428 lb), giving a useful load of 88 kg (194 lb). Like the ANT it is based upon the E-Bird van be folded up and transported and carried in an automobile trunk.

== Specifications (E-Bird) ==
Data from Tacke

General characteristics

- Crew: one
- Wingspan: 10 m (32 ft 10 in)
- Wing area: 12.8 m^{2} (138 sq ft)
- Empty weight: 106 kg (234 lb)
- Gross weight: 194 kg (428 lb)
- Powerplant: 1 × electric motor with a 5.85 kWh battery, 16 kW (21 hp)
- Propellers: 2-bladed folding, carbon fibre

Performance

- Wing loading: 15.15 kg/m^{2} (3.10 lb/sq ft)
