= Powrachute Sky Rascal =

American powered parachute

Sky Rascal

General information
- Type: Powered parachute
- National origin: United States
- Manufacturer: Powrachute
- Status: In production

The Powrachute Sky Rascal is an American powered parachute, designed and produced by Powrachute.

== Design and development ==
The aircraft was designed to comply with the FAI Microlight rules it features a parachute-style high-wing and single-seat in an open framed structure, tricycle landing gear and a single 54 hp (40 kW) Rotax 503 engine in pusher configuration. A version with a Rotax 447 to meet the FAR 103 Ultralight rules is also available.

== Specifications (Rotax 503) ==
Data from World Directory of Leisure Aviation 2004/2005

General characteristics

- Crew: one
- Wingspan: 32 ft 10 in (10 m)
- Wing area: 430 sq ft (40 m^{2})
- Empty weight: 254 lb (115 kg)
- Gross weight: 772 lb (350 kg)
- Powerplant: 1 × Rotax 503 twin cylinder, two-stroke, liquid-cooled aircraft engine, 54 hp (40 kW)
- Propellers: 3-bladed

Performance

- Maximum speed: 36 mph (58 km/h, 31 kn)
- Wing loading: 1.6 lb/sq ft (7.8 kg/m^{2})
