= Apollo Ultralight Aircraft =

Hungarian aircraft manufacturer

- Company type: Privately held company
- Industry: Aerospace
- Headquarters: Eger, Hungary
- Products: Kit aircraft, ultralight trikes, gyroplanes, light-sport aircraft
- Website: apollo-aircraft.com

Apollo Ultralight Aircraft is a Hungarian aircraft manufacturer based in Eger. The company specializes in the design and manufacture of ultralight aircraft, gyroplanes and ultralight trikes, in the form of kits for amateur construction and ready-to-fly aircraft for the European Fédération Aéronautique Internationale microlight and the American light-sport aircraft categories.

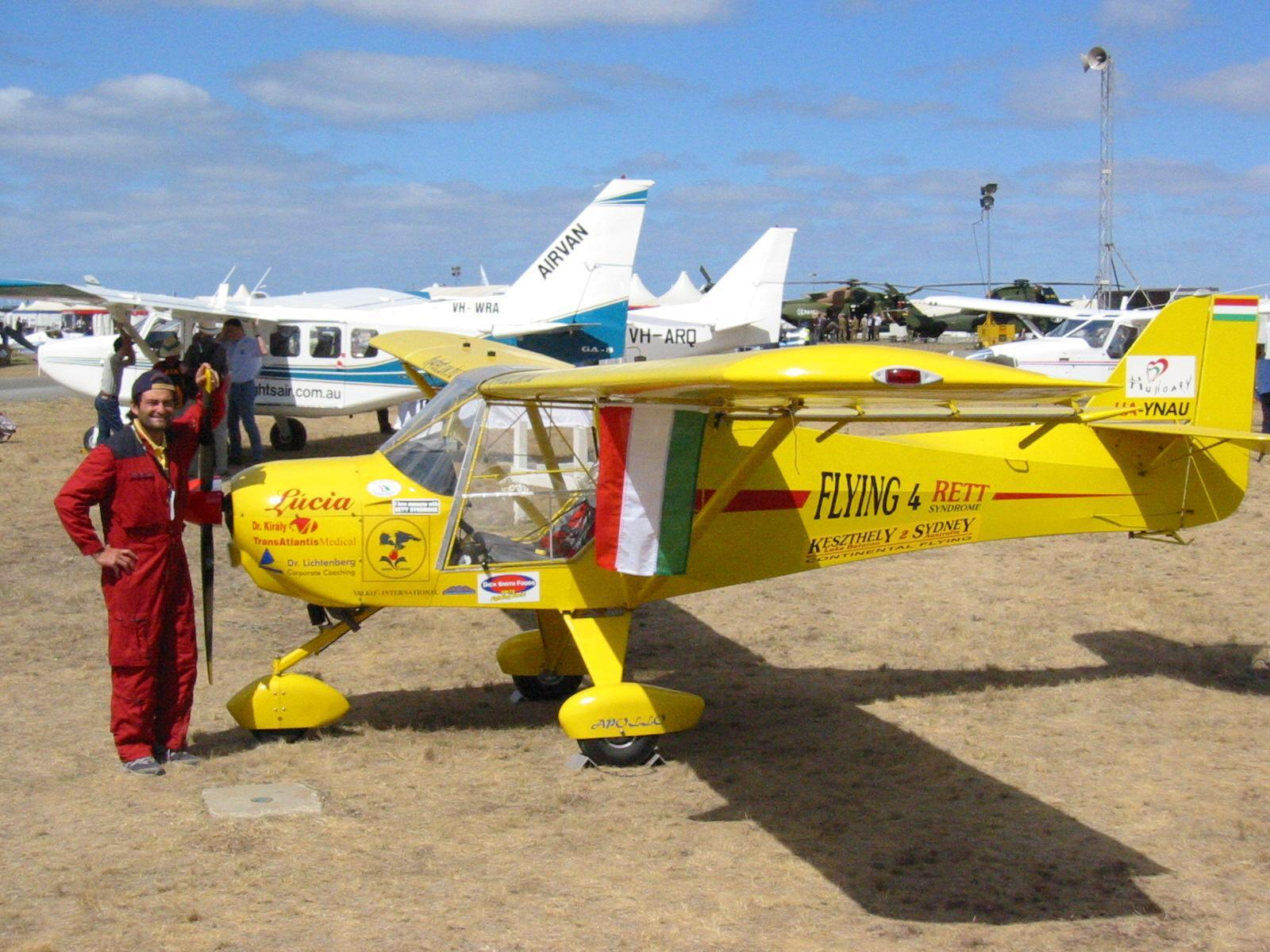
Apollo Fox

The company produces a wide variety of aircraft including five ultralight trike models, the Delta Jet, Jet Star, Monsoon, Racer GT, C15D Toples and the Classic. Apollo also makes a single fixed wing microlight, the Fox which is a copy of the Denney Kitfox and a gyroplane, the Gyro AG1.

The company has an American distributor, Apollo Aircraft, which has completed US Federal Aviation Administration light-sport aircraft certification for the Fox fixed wing microlight as well as the Delta Jet, Jet Star and Monsoon trikes.

Apollo exhibited at AERO Friedrichshafen in 2013 as well as the Al Ain airshow in the United Arab Emirates.

== Aircraft ==
Summary of aircraft built by Apollo Ultralight Aircraft
| Model name | First flight | Number built | Type |
|---|---|---|---|
| Apollo Fox | | | Two seat, fixed wing, microlight aircraft |
| Apollo Delta Jet | | | Two seat, flex wing, ultralight trike |
| Apollo Jet Star | | | Two seat, flex wing, ultralight trike |
| Apollo Monsoon | | | Two seat, flex wing, ultralight trike |
| Apollo Racer GT | | | Two seat, flex wing, ultralight trike |
| Apollo C15D Toples | | | Two seat, flex wing, ultralight trike |
| Apollo Classic | | | Two seat, flex wing, ultralight trike |
| Apollo Gyro AG1 | | | Two seat gyroplane |
