= Aeros ANT =

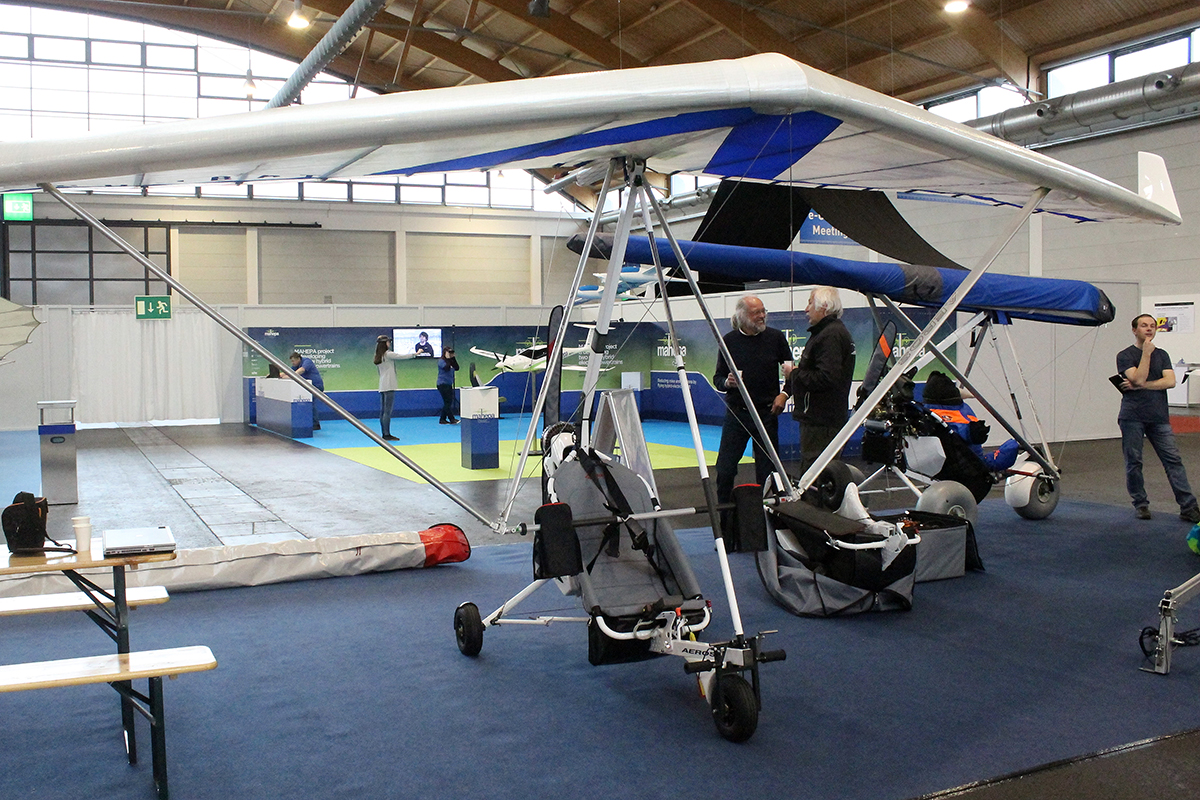

General information
- Type: Ultralight trike
- National origin: Ukraine
- Manufacturer: Aeros
- Status: In production (2018)

History
- Variant: Electric Ride E-Bird

The Aeros ANT (Aeros Nanolight Trike) is a Ukrainian ultralight trike, designed and produced by Aeros of Kyiv. The aircraft is supplied complete and ready-to-fly.

== Design and development ==
The aircraft was designed in the mid-2010s to comply with the Fédération Aéronautique Internationale microlight category, including the category's maximum gross weight of 450 kg (992 lb). The aircraft has a maximum gross weight of 185 kg (408 lb). The design meets the US FAR 103 Ultralight Vehicles rules, including the category's maximum empty weight of 254 lb (115 kg) and has also been certified in the German 120 kg class.

The ANT is a nanotrike, with an emphasis on lightness, simplicity and low-cost. It features a cable-braced hang glider-style high-wing, weight-shift controls, a single-seat open cockpit without a cockpit fairing, tricycle landing gear without wheel pants and a single engine in pusher configuration.

The ANT is supplied with a carrying bag into which the aircraft fuselage frame can be stowed for ground transport by automobile, after folding up the airframe. A separate bag holds the hang glider wing. The aircraft can be derigged for ground transportation in 6 minutes and can be set up to fly in 30 minutes.

The aircraft is made from bolted-together aluminium tubing, with its single surface, or optionally double surface wing covered in Dacron sailcloth. The wing is supported by a single tube-type kingpost and uses an "A" frame weight-shift control bar. The powerplant is a single-cylinder, air-cooled, two-stroke, single-ignition 25 hp (19 kW) Cors-Air M25Y engine, normally used for powered paragliders. The Cors-Air M25Y engine is equipped with a clutch that allows the propeller to stop at idle engine speeds. A Bailey engine is optional.

With the Cors-Air engine and a single surface wing, the ANT has an empty weight of 76 kg (168 lb) and a gross weight of 185 kg (408 lb), giving a useful load of 109 kg (240 lb). With full fuel of 19 litres (4.2 imp gal; 5.0 US gal) the payload is 95 kg (209 lb).

A number of different wings can be fitted to the basic carriage, including the basic Aeros Discus T, a version of the Discus hang glider wing for nanotrikes, that comes in two sizes, Discus 14T and 15T. The Fox T wing is a slow and maneuverable wing that can also be fitted. Higher performance can be obtained with the Combat T wing, a topless hang glider wing adapted for nanotrikes.

== Specifications (ANT) ==
Data from Tacke

General characteristics

- Crew: one
- Wing area: 9.6 m^{2} (103 sq ft)
- Empty weight: 76 kg (168 lb)
- Gross weight: 185 kg (408 lb)
- Fuel capacity: 19 litres (4.2 imp gal; 5.0 US gal)
- Powerplant: 1 × Cors-Air M25Y single-cylinder, air-cooled, two stroke aircraft engine, 19 kW (25 hp)
- Propellers: 2-bladed fixed pitch

Performance

- Maximum speed: 80 km/h (50 mph, 43 kn)
- Cruise speed: 50 km/h (31 mph, 27 kn)
- Stall speed: 35 km/h (22 mph, 19 kn)
- Rate of climb: 3.5 m/s (690 ft/min)
- Wing loading: 19.3 kg/m^{2} (4.0 lb/sq ft)
