= Apollo Fox =

Hungarian ultralight aircraft

Fox
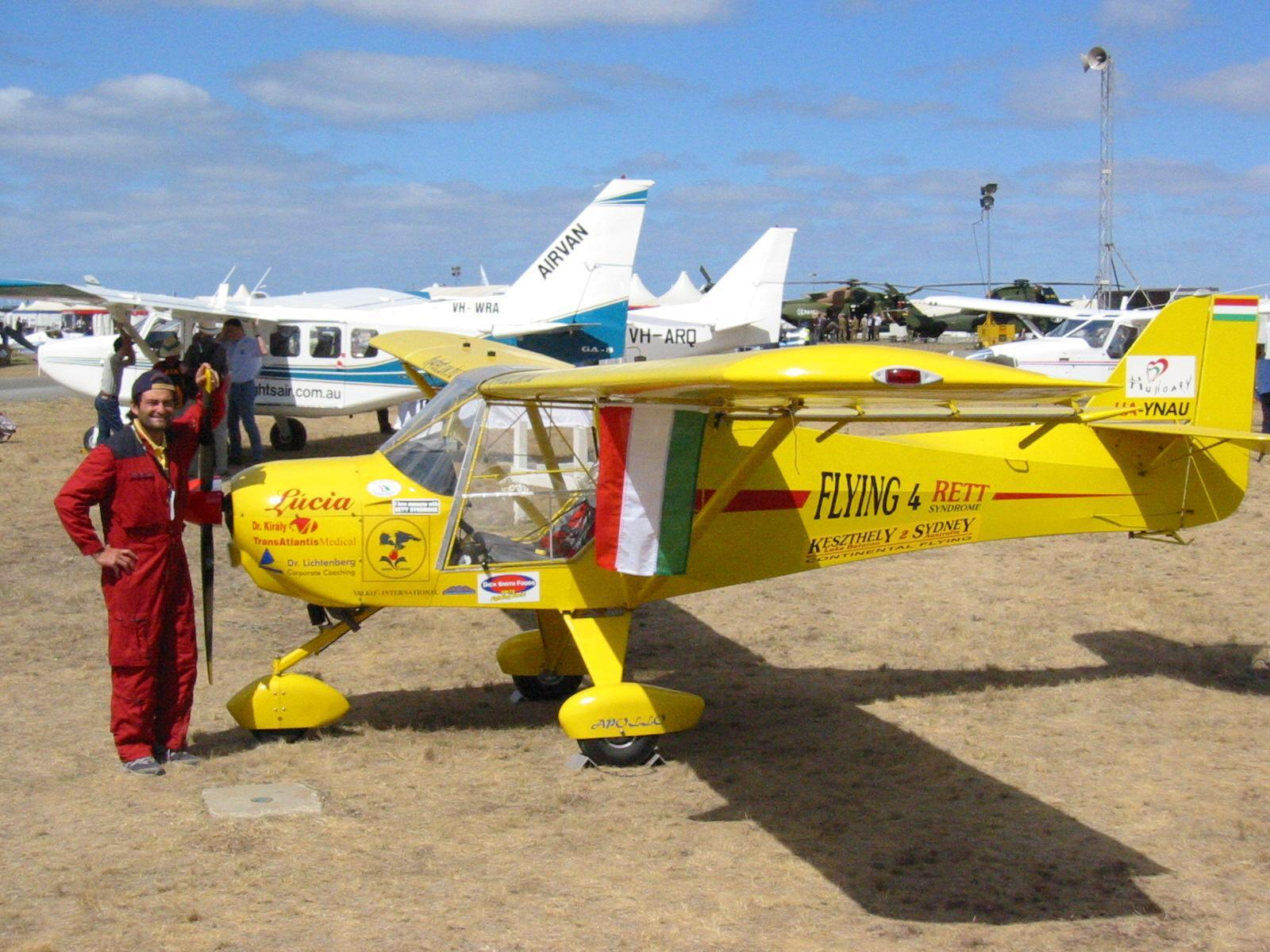

General information
- Type: Ultralight aircraft and Light-sport aircraft
- National origin: Hungary
- Manufacturer: Apollo Ultralight Aircraft
- Status: In production

History
- Developed from: Denney Kitfox

The Apollo Fox is a Hungarian ultralight and light-sport aircraft produced by Apollo Ultralight Aircraft, of Eger. The aircraft is supplied complete ready-to-fly.

== Design and development ==
The Apollo Fox was derived from the Aeropro Eurofox, which itself was a metric adaptation of the Denney Kitfox. The Kitfox in turn is a derivative of the Avid Flyer. The Apollo Fox was adapted to comply with the Fédération Aéronautique Internationale microlight rules and US light-sport aircraft rules. It features a strut-braced high-wing, a two-seats-in-side-by-side configuration enclosed cockpit, fixed tricycle landing gear or optionally conventional landing gear and a single engine in tractor configuration.

The aircraft fuselage is made from welded steel tubing, while the wing is built with aluminum spars and ribs. The fuselage and flying surfaces are covered in doped aircraft fabric. Its 9.15 m (30.0 ft) span wing is supported by V-struts and jury struts and features Junkers-style ailerons. Standard engines available are the 64 hp (48 kW) Rotax 582 two-stroke, the 80 hp (60 kW) Rotax 912UL and the 100 hp (75 kW) Rotax 912ULS four-stroke powerplant. The cabin width is 110 cm (43 in).

The aircraft's wings fold for storage or ground transportation and can be folded by one person in ten minutes.

== Operational history ==
In 2003 a 100 hp (75 kW) Rotax 912ULS-equipped Fox was flown by Andor Kántás and Csongor Lathky from Sármellék, Hungary to Sydney, Australia, a distance of 25,000 km (15,534 mi).

== Specifications (Fox) ==
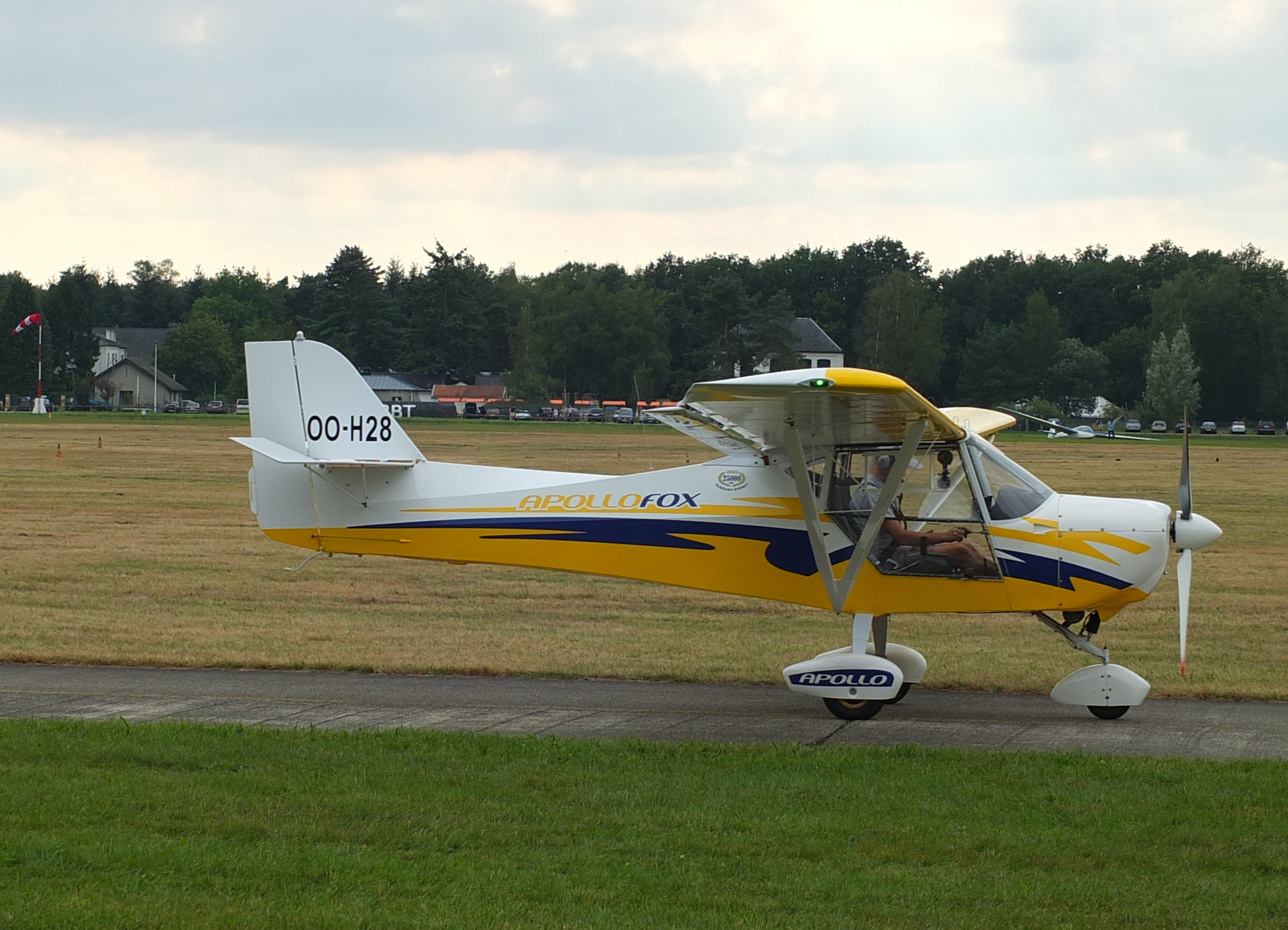
Apollo Fox

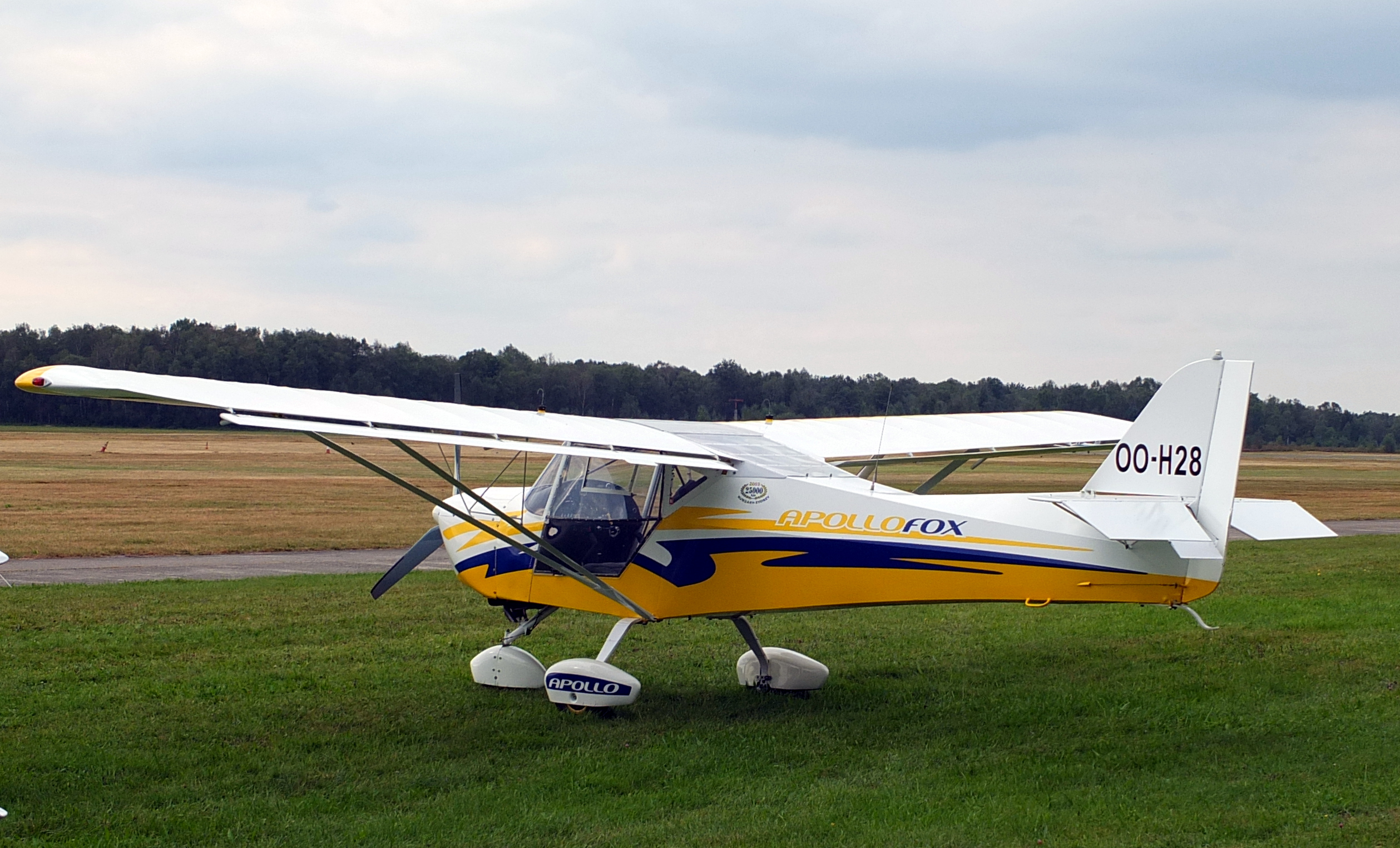
Apollo Fox

Data from Bayerl and Apollo

General characteristics

- Crew: one
- Capacity: one passenger
- Length: 5.80 m (19 ft 0 in)
- Wingspan: 9.15 m (30 ft 0 in)
- Height: 1.7 m (5 ft 7 in)
- Wing area: 11.4 m^{2} (123 sq ft)
- Empty weight: 284 kg (626 lb)
- Gross weight: 450 kg (992 lb)
- Fuel capacity: 60 litres (13 imp gal; 16 US gal)
- Powerplant: 1 × Rotax 912ULS four cylinder, liquid and air-cooled, four stroke, 75 kW (101 hp)

Performance

- Maximum speed: 200 km/h (120 mph, 110 kn)
- Cruise speed: 150 km/h (93 mph, 81 kn)
- Stall speed: 64 km/h (40 mph, 35 kn)
- Range: 800 km (500 mi, 430 nmi)
- g limits: +4/-2
- Rate of climb: 5 m/s (980 ft/min)
- Wing loading: 39.47 kg/m^{2} (8.08 lb/sq ft)
