= Apollo Monsoon =

Monsoon

General information
- Type: Ultralight trike
- National origin: Hungary
- Manufacturer: Apollo Ultralight Aircraft
- Status: In production (2013)

History
- Variant: Evolution Revo

The Apollo Monsoon is a Hungarian ultralight trike, designed and produced by Apollo Ultralight Aircraft of Eger. The aircraft is supplied as a kit for amateur construction or as a complete ready-to-fly-aircraft.

== Design and development ==
Designed especially for the American market in conjunction with their US distributor, the Monsoon was intended to comply with the Fédération Aéronautique Internationale microlight category as well as the US light-sport aircraft category. It features a cable-braced or strut-braced hang glider-style high-wing, weight-shift controls, a two-seats-in-tandem, open cockpit, tricycle landing gear with wheel pants and a single engine in pusher configuration.

The Monsoon is accepted in the United States as both an Experimental and Special Light-sport aircraft.

The aircraft is made from bolted-together aluminum tubing, with its double surface wing covered in Dacron sailcloth. The aircraft uses an "A" frame weight-shift control bar. The landing gear has all three wheels independently suspended and each wheel is equipped with disc brakes. A parking brake is also fitted. The powerplant options include the twin cylinder, liquid-cooled, two-stroke, dual-ignition 64 hp (48 kW) Rotax 582 engine, the four cylinder, air and liquid-cooled, four-stroke, dual-ignition 80 hp (60 kW) Rotax 912 or 100 hp (75 kW) Rotax 912S engine. Engine air-cooling is facilitated by an under-fuselage air scoop.

In its AS-IV model the aircraft has an empty weight of 249 kg (549 lb) and a gross weight of 450 kg (992 lb), giving a useful load of 201 kg (443 lb). With full fuel of 57 litres (13 imp gal; 15 US gal) the payload is 160 kg (353 lb).

A number of different wings can be fitted to the basic carriage, including the cable-braced Aeros Profi, the strut-braced Aeros Profi TL and the North Wing Reflex 11 or 13. Early examples were provided with the strut-braced Gibbogear Manta Ray 12.5 wing. Available options include the Ballistic Recovery Systems 1050 ballistic parachute and an Enigma colour glass combination EFIS/GPS system.

== Specifications (Monsoon AS-IV) ==
Data from Bayerl

General characteristics

- Crew: one
- Capacity: one passenger
- Wingspan: 7.9 m (25 ft 11 in)
- Wing area: 12.5 m^{2} (135 sq ft)
- Empty weight: 249 kg (549 lb)
- Gross weight: 450 kg (992 lb)
- Fuel capacity: 57 litres (13 imp gal; 15 US gal)
- Powerplant: 1 × Rotax 912ULS four cylinder, liquid and air-cooled, four stroke aircraft engine, 75 kW (101 hp)
- Propellers: 3-bladed composite

Performance

- Maximum speed: 130 km/h (81 mph, 70 kn)
- Cruise speed: 108 km/h (67 mph, 58 kn)
- Stall speed: 55 km/h (34 mph, 30 kn)
- Wing loading: 36 kg/m^{2} (7.4 lb/sq ft)
