= Apollo Jet Star =

Jet Star

General information
- Type: Ultralight trike
- National origin: Hungary
- Manufacturer: Apollo Ultralight Aircraft
- Status: In production (2013)

The Apollo Jet Star is a Hungarian ultralight trike, designed and produced by Apollo Ultralight Aircraft of Eger. The aircraft is supplied as a kit for amateur construction or as a complete ready-to-fly-aircraft.

== Design and development ==
The Jet Star was designed to comply with the Fédération Aéronautique Internationale microlight category as well as the US light-sport aircraft category. It features a cable-braced or strut-braced hang glider-style high-wing, weight-shift controls, a two-seats-in-tandem, open cockpit, tricycle landing gear with wheel pants and a single engine in pusher configuration.

The Jet Star is accepted in the United States as both an Experimental and Special Light-sport aircraft.

The aircraft is made from bolted-together aluminum tubing, with its double surface wing covered in Dacron sailcloth. The aircraft uses an "A" frame weight-shift control bar. The main landing gear uses strut-type suspension, rather than the leaf-type suspension used on the Apollo Delta Jet series. The powerplant options include the twin cylinder, liquid-cooled, two-stroke, dual-ignition 64 hp (48 kW) Rotax 582 engine, the four cylinder, air and liquid-cooled, four-stroke, dual-ignition 80 hp (60 kW) Rotax 912 or 100 hp (75 kW) Rotax 912S engine.

The aircraft has an empty weight of 180 kg (397 lb) and a gross weight of 430 kg (948 lb), giving a useful load of 250 kg (551 lb). With full fuel of 45 litres (9.9 imp gal; 12 US gal) the payload is 218 kg (481 lb).

A number of different wings can be fitted to the basic carriage, including the cable-braced Aeros Profi, the cable-braced Air Creation iXess, the strut-braced Aeros Profi TL or the strut-braced Gibbogear Manta Ray 12.5.

== Specifications (Jet Star) ==
Data from Bayerl

General characteristics

- Crew: one
- Capacity: one passenger
- Wingspan: 9.5 m (31 ft 2 in)
- Wing area: 15 m^{2} (160 sq ft)
- Empty weight: 180 kg (397 lb)
- Gross weight: 430 kg (948 lb)
- Fuel capacity: 45 litres (9.9 imp gal; 12 US gal)
- Powerplant: 1 × Rotax 912UL four cylinder, liquid and air-cooled, four stroke aircraft engine, 60 kW (80 hp)
- Propellers: 3-bladed composite

Performance

- Maximum speed: 125 km/h (78 mph, 67 kn)
- Cruise speed: 110 km/h (68 mph, 59 kn)
- Stall speed: 55 km/h (34 mph, 30 kn)
- Rate of climb: 4 m/s (790 ft/min)
- Wing loading: 28.7 kg/m^{2} (5.9 lb/sq ft)
