= Model 25 =

Model 25 may refer to:

== Aircraft ==
- Mitsubishi G4M2b Model 25, an experimental model of the Mitsubishi G4M medium bomber
- Consolidated Model 25, a predecessor to the Consolidated P-30 fighter aircraft
- Bellanca Model 25 Skyrocket, a prototype light airplane

== Firearms ==
- Daisy Model 25, a BB gun
- CZ Model 25, a submachine gun
- Smith & Wesson Model 25, a double-action revolver

== Other ==
- IBM PS/2 Model 25, a low-end member of the PS/2 family of personal computers
- IBM System/360 Model 25, a low-end member of the System/360 family of mainframe computers

== See also ==
- M25 (disambiguation)
