= Aero Nord =

French aircraft manufacturer

Aero Nord ULM
- Company type: Privately held company
- Industry: Aerospace
- Headquarters: Bénifontaine, France
- Key people: Frédéric Bastien
- Products: paramotors, flight training
- Website: nordulm.free.fr

Aero Nord ULM (ultra-léger motorisé, English: motorized ultralight) was a French aircraft manufacturer based in Lorgies, and later in Bénifontaine. The company specialized in the design and manufacture of paramotors in the form of ready-to-fly aircraft in the US FAR 103 Ultralight Vehicles rules and the European microlight category.

While no longer an aircraft manufacturer, the company continues as an ultralight aircraft flight school using autogyros and ultralight trikes, as well as a dealer for Aeros products, with Frédéric Bastien as chief instructor.

In the mid-2000s the company manufactured a line of paramotors called the Aero Nord AIR. Reviewer Rene Coulon wrote in 2003 that the design "shows good understanding of the market and skill in the production" and noted that the series had attracted "considerable attention".

== Aircraft ==
Summary of aircraft built by Aero Nord
Model name	First flight	Number built	Type
Aero Nord AIR	mid-2000s		Single-place paramotor
