= Apollo Gyro AG1 =

Gyro AG1
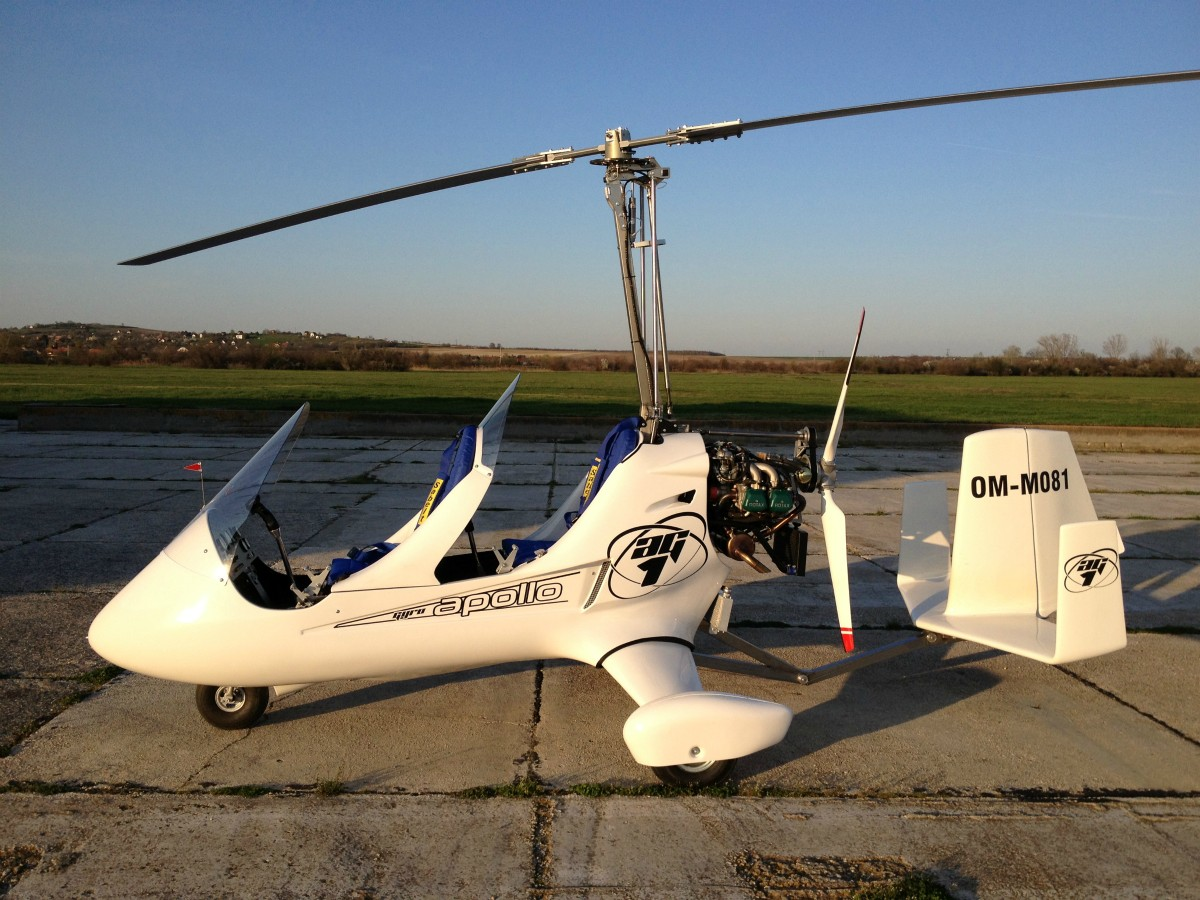

General information
- Type: Ultralight autogyro
- National origin: Hungary
- Manufacturer: Apollo Ultralight Aircraft

History
- Manufactured: 2012-present
- Introduction date: 2012

The Apollo Gyro AG1 is a Hungarian autogyro produced by Apollo Ultralight Aircraft of Eger and introduced in 2012. The aircraft is supplied ready-to-fly.

== Design and development ==
The aircraft features a carriage built on a welded stainless steel frame, with a fiberglass composite streamlined fairing, dual-controls, a two-seats-in-tandem, open cockpit, tricycle landing gear with wheel pants and a single engine in pusher configuration. The rotor is of aluminum alloy and includes a pneumatic pre-rotator.

The powerplant options include the four cylinder, liquid-cooled, four-stroke, dual-ignition 100 hp (75 kW) Rotax 912ULS engine, or the 115 hp (86 kW) turbo-charged Rotax 914 engine.

Originally an open-cockpit design with dual windshields, in 2013 a bubble canopy was introduced as an option. It weighs 20 kg (44 lb) and can be installed in five minutes.

== Specifications (AG1) ==
Data from Tacke and manufacturer

General characteristics

- Crew: 1
- Capacity: 1 passenger
- Empty weight: 256 kg (564 lb)
- Gross weight: 500 kg (1,102 lb)
- Fuel capacity: 60 L (16 US gal; 13 imp gal)
- Powerplant: 1 × Rotax 912ULS 4 cylinder horizontally-opposed piston engine, 75 kW (100 hp)
- Main rotor diameter: 8.4 m (27 ft 7 in)
- Main rotor area: 55.4 m^{2} (596 sq ft) teetering head rotor
- Propellers: 3-bladed composite fixed pitch

Performance

- Maximum speed: 160 km/h (99 mph, 86 kn)
- Cruise speed: 160 km/h (99 mph, 86 kn)
- Stall speed: 30 km/h (19 mph, 16 kn)
- Never exceed speed: 180 km/h (110 mph, 97 kn)
- Rate of climb: 5 m/s (980 ft/min) at gross weight
