= Cors-Air M25Y Black Devil =

Italian aircraft engine

M25Y Black Devil
- Type: Aircraft engine
- National origin: Italy
- Manufacturer: Cors-Air srl

The Cors-Air M25Y Black Devil is an Italian aircraft engine, designed and produced by Cors-Air of Barco di Bibbiano for use in powered parachutes and very small ultralight trikes flown by heavy pilots.

== Design and development ==
The M25Y is a single-cylinder two-stroke, 173 cc (10.6 cu in) displacement, air-cooled, petrol engine design, with a poly V belt reduction drive. The reduction drive has optional reduction ratios of 2.2:1, 2.3:1, 2.5:1, 2.6:1, 2.7:1 and 2.88:1. The M25Y employs a single capacitor discharge ignition, a WB37 diaphragm carburettor and produces 21 hp (16 kW) at 7900 rpm. The weight is 14.4 kg (31.7 lb) including the exhaust system.

The engine has a centrifugal clutch that stops the propeller spinning when the engine is operated at low RPM, a safety feature for use in powered paraglider applications.

== Applications ==
- Aeros ANT
- Aerola Alatus

== Specifications (MY25 Black Devil) ==
Data from Tacke

=== General characteristics ===
- Type: Single-cylinder, two stroke aircraft engine
- Bore: 65 mm (2.6 in)
- Stroke: 52 mm (2.0 in)
- Displacement: 173 cc (10.6 cu in)
- Length: 240 mm (9.4 in)
- Width: 250 mm (9.8 in)
- Height: 330 mm (13.0 in)
- Dry weight: 14.4 kg (31.7 lb) including the exhaust system

=== Components ===
- Fuel system: WB37 diaphragm carburettor
- Fuel type: petrol
- Cooling system: air

=== Performance ===
- Power output: 21 hp (16 kW)
- Compression ratio: 11:1

== See also ==
Related lists

- List of aircraft engines
