= Aeros-2 =

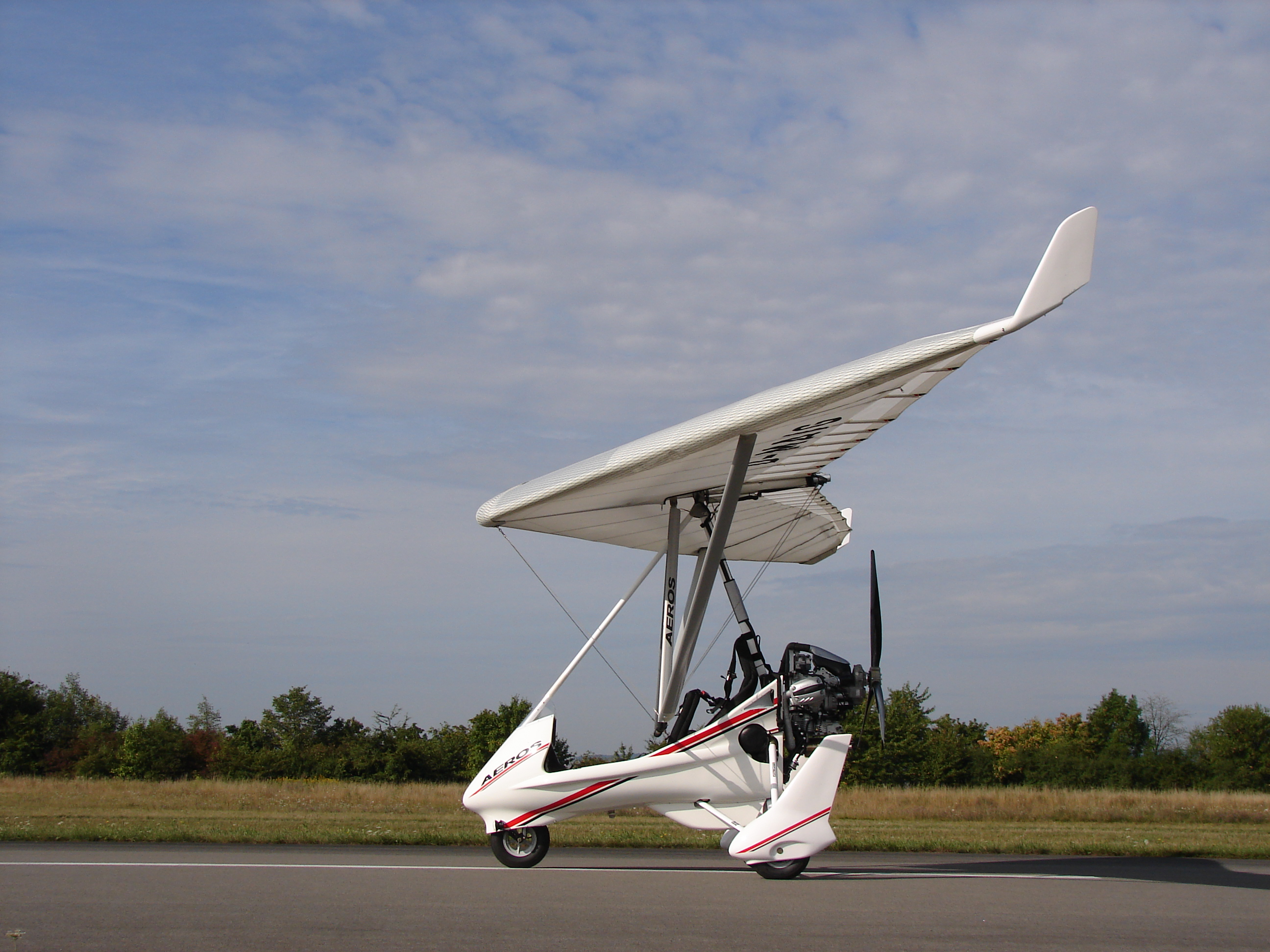
- Aeros-2 with the Aeros Profi TL wing

General information
- Type: Ultralight trike
- National origin: Ukraine
- Manufacturer: Aeros
- Status: In production

History
- Developed from: Aeros-1

The Aeros-2 is a Ukrainian ultralight trike, designed and produced by Aeros of Kyiv. The aircraft is supplied as a complete ready-to-fly aircraft or as kit for amateur construction.

In the United States the design is marketed as the Venture and Velocity.

== Design and development ==
Developed from the earlier Aeros-1, the Aeros-2 features a cable-braced hang glider-style high-wing, weight-shift controls, a two-seats-in-tandem open cockpit, tricycle landing gear and a single engine in pusher configuration.

The aircraft is made from square tubing, with its wing covered in Dacron sailcloth. Its 10 m (32.8 ft) span wing is supported by a single tube-type kingpost and uses an "A" frame control bar. The occupants are housed in streamlined fibreglass cockpit fairing. Engines available include the twin cylinder, two-stroke, liquid-cooled 64 hp (48 kW) Rotax 582 and the four cylinder four-stroke 80 hp (60 kW) Rotax 912UL and 100 hp (75 kW) 912ULS. Engine mounts for BMW and Subaru engines are also available. Available wings to be mated to the carriage are the Aeros Profi, Aeros Stranger, Aeros Stream and Aeros Still. The wing-mounting pylon is foldable, allowing the wing to be installed by one person. Floats and ski landing gear are optional.

== Variants ==
Venture 500
Aeros-2 equipped with the Rotax 503 for the US market.
Venture 600
Aeros-2 equipped with the Rotax 582 for the US market.

== Specifications (Aeros-2 912) ==
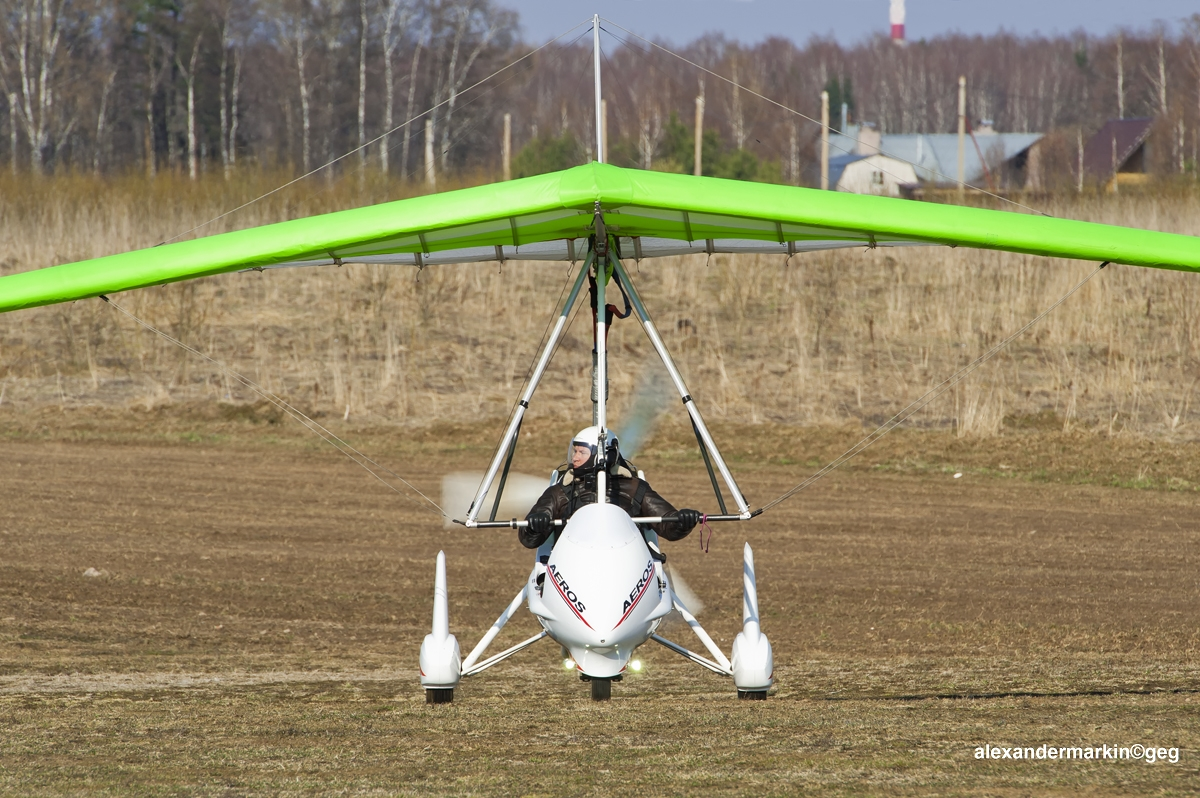
Aeros-2

Data from Aeros

General characteristics

- Crew: one
- Capacity: one passenger
- Wing area: 14.5 m^{2} (156 sq ft)
- Empty weight: 229.5 kg (506 lb)
- Gross weight: 472.5 kg (1,042 lb)
- Fuel capacity: 53 litres (12 imp gal; 14 US gal)
- Powerplant: 1 × Rotax 912UL four cylinder, four stroke aircraft engine, 60 kW (80 hp)

Performance

- Cruise speed: 90 km/h (56 mph, 49 kn)
- Stall speed: 52 km/h (32 mph, 28 kn)
- Never exceed speed: 130 km/h (81 mph, 70 kn)
- Service ceiling: 3,500 m (11,500 ft)
- g limits: +4/-2
- Maximum glide ratio: 6:1
- Rate of climb: 5 m/s (980 ft/min) at 450 kg take-off weight
