= Apollo Delta Jet =

Hungarian ultralight aircraft

Delta Jet

General information
- Type: Ultralight trike
- National origin: Hungary
- Manufacturer: Apollo Ultralight Aircraft
- Status: In production (2013)

The Apollo Delta Jet is a Hungarian ultralight trike, designed and produced by Apollo Ultralight Aircraft of Eger. The aircraft is supplied as a kit for amateur construction or as a complete ready-to-fly-aircraft.

== Design and development ==
The aircraft was designed to comply with the Fédération Aéronautique Internationale microlight category and the US light-sport aircraft category. It features a cable-braced or strut-braced hang glider-style high-wing, weight-shift controls, a two-seats-in-tandem, open cockpit, tricycle landing gear with wheel pants and a single engine in pusher configuration.

The Delta Jet is accepted in the United States as both an Experimental and Special Light-sport aircraft.

The aircraft is made from bolted-together aluminum tubing, with its double surface wing covered in Dacron sailcloth. The aircraft uses an "A" frame weight-shift control bar. The powerplant options include the twin cylinder, liquid-cooled, two-stroke, dual-ignition 64 hp (48 kW) Rotax 582 engine, the four cylinder, air and liquid-cooled, four-stroke, dual-ignition 80 hp (60 kW) Rotax 912 or 100 hp (75 kW) Rotax 912S engine. In its AS-III model the aircraft has an empty weight of 236 kg (520 lb) and a gross weight of 472.5 kg (1,042 lb), giving a useful load of 236.5 kg (521 lb). With full fuel of 55 litres (12 imp gal; 15 US gal) the payload is 196.5 kg (433 lb).

A number of different wings can be fitted to the basic carriage, including the cable-braced Aeros Profi, the strut-braced Aeros Profi TL and the Apollo Reflex 11 or 13.

== Variants ==
Delta Jet
Base model with an empty weight of 180 kg (397 lb)
Delta Jet AS-III
Equipped model with an empty weight of 236 kg (520 lb)
Delta Jet 2
Improved and fully equipped model

== Specifications (AS-III) ==
Data from Bayerl

General characteristics

- Crew: one
- Capacity: one passenger
- Wingspan: 10.0 m (32 ft 10 in)
- Wing area: 14.5 m^{2} (156 sq ft)
- Empty weight: 236 kg (520 lb)
- Gross weight: 472.5 kg (1,042 lb)
- Fuel capacity: 55 litres (12 imp gal; 15 US gal)
- Powerplant: 1 × Rotax 912ULS four cylinder, liquid and air-cooled, four stroke aircraft engine, 75 kW (101 hp)
- Propellers: 3-bladed composite

Performance

- Maximum speed: 160 km/h (99 mph, 86 kn)
- Cruise speed: 130 km/h (81 mph, 70 kn)
- Stall speed: 64 km/h (40 mph, 35 kn)
- Rate of climb: 7 m/s (1,400 ft/min)
- Wing loading: 32.6 kg/m^{2} (6.7 lb/sq ft)
