= Aeros Still =

Still

General information
- Type: Ultralight trike wing
- National origin: Ukraine
- Manufacturer: Aeros
- Status: In production (2013)

The Aeros Still is a Ukrainian single-surface ultralight trike wing, designed and produced by Aeros of Kyiv. The wing is widely used on Aeros trikes as well as by other ultralight aircraft manufacturers.

== Design and development ==
The Still wing is a cable-braced, king post-equipped hang glider-style wing designed as a docile beginner and flight training wing for two-place trikes. It comes in one size, the Still-17, named for its metric wing area of 17.4 m^{2} (187 sq ft).

The wing is made from bolted-together aluminium tubing, with its single surface wing covered in Dacron sailcloth. The wing's crosstube is exposed and is of a floating design. Its 10.3 m (33.8 ft) span wing has a nose angle of 122°, an aspect ratio of 6.1:1 and uses an "A" frame weight-shift control bar.

== Applications ==
- Aeros-2
- Aeros Cross Country

== Specifications (Still-17) ==
Data from Bayerl and Aeros

General characteristics

- Wingspan: 10.3 m (33 ft 10 in)
- Wing area: 17.4 m^{2} (187 sq ft)
- Aspect ratio: 6.1:1
- Empty weight: 45 kg (99 lb) wing weight
- Gross weight: 450 kg (992 lb) maximum aircraft gross weight allowed

Performance

- Cruise speed: 80 km/h (50 mph, 43 kn)
- Stall speed: 50 km/h (31 mph, 27 kn)
- Never exceed speed: 105 km/h (65 mph, 57 kn)
- g limits: +4/-2
- Wing loading: 25.9 kg/m^{2} (5.3 lb/sq ft) maximum
