= Aerola Alatus =

Ukrainian glider

Alatus

General information
- Type: Glider
- National origin: Ukraine
- Manufacturer: Aerola
- Status: In production (2012)

The Aerola Alatus is a Ukrainian mid-wing, single-seat, glider and motor glider, designed and produced by Aerola of Kyiv.

== Design and development ==
A manufacturer of rigid wing hang gliders, Aerola decided to produce an ultralight sailplane along similar concept lines. The resulting aircraft is offered with and without a retractable engine. The prototype glider was known as the AL-12, with the motorized prototype designated as the AL-12M. The production versions are the Alatus and Alatus-M, respectively.

The aircraft is made from composites. Its 13.1 m (43.0 ft) span, slightly forward-swept wing has an area of 13.2 m^{2} (142 sq ft). The landing gear is of a bicycle design, with a main wheel and a nose wheel, plus wing tip skids. The bubble canopy is in one piece and is removable. The light wing loading and low stall speed mean that the aircraft can be flown in the smallest thermals. The wings can be removed for ground transport on top of an automobile, while the fuselage is small enough to fit inside a van or to be secured to a small trailer.

== Variants ==
AL-12
Initial unpowered prototype
AL-12M
Initial powered prototype
Alatus
Production model pure glider with an empty weight of 80 kg (176 lb) and a gross weight of 200 kg (441 lb). Conforms to German LTF and LFG requirements.
Alatus-M
Production model motor glider with an empty weight of 115 kg (254 lb) and a gross weight of 235 kg (518 lb). Conforms to German LTF and LFG requirements, as well as US FAR 103 Ultralight Vehicles rules. Powered by a pylon-mounted retractable 20 hp (15 kW) CorsAir M25Y ES engine that produces a climb rate of 2.0 m/s (400 fpm) and gives an endurance of 1.5 hours. An electric powerplant is also available which provides a half-hour endurance. The Alatus-M can be converted back to the Alatus by removing the powerplant pylon and engine.

== Specifications (Alatus) ==
Data from Bayerl and Aerola

General characteristics

- Crew: one
- Empty weight: 80 kg (176 lb)
- Gross weight: 200 kg (441 lb)

Performance

- Stall speed: 41 km/h (25 mph, 22 kn)
- Never exceed speed: 140 km/h (87 mph, 76 kn)
- Maximum glide ratio: 27:1 at 70 km/h (43 mph)
- Rate of sink: 0.6 m/s (120 ft/min) at 50 km/h (31 mph)
- Wing loading: 15.2 kg/m^{2} (3.1 lb/sq ft)

== See also ==
Related lists

- List of gliders
