= Aeros Profi =

Profi
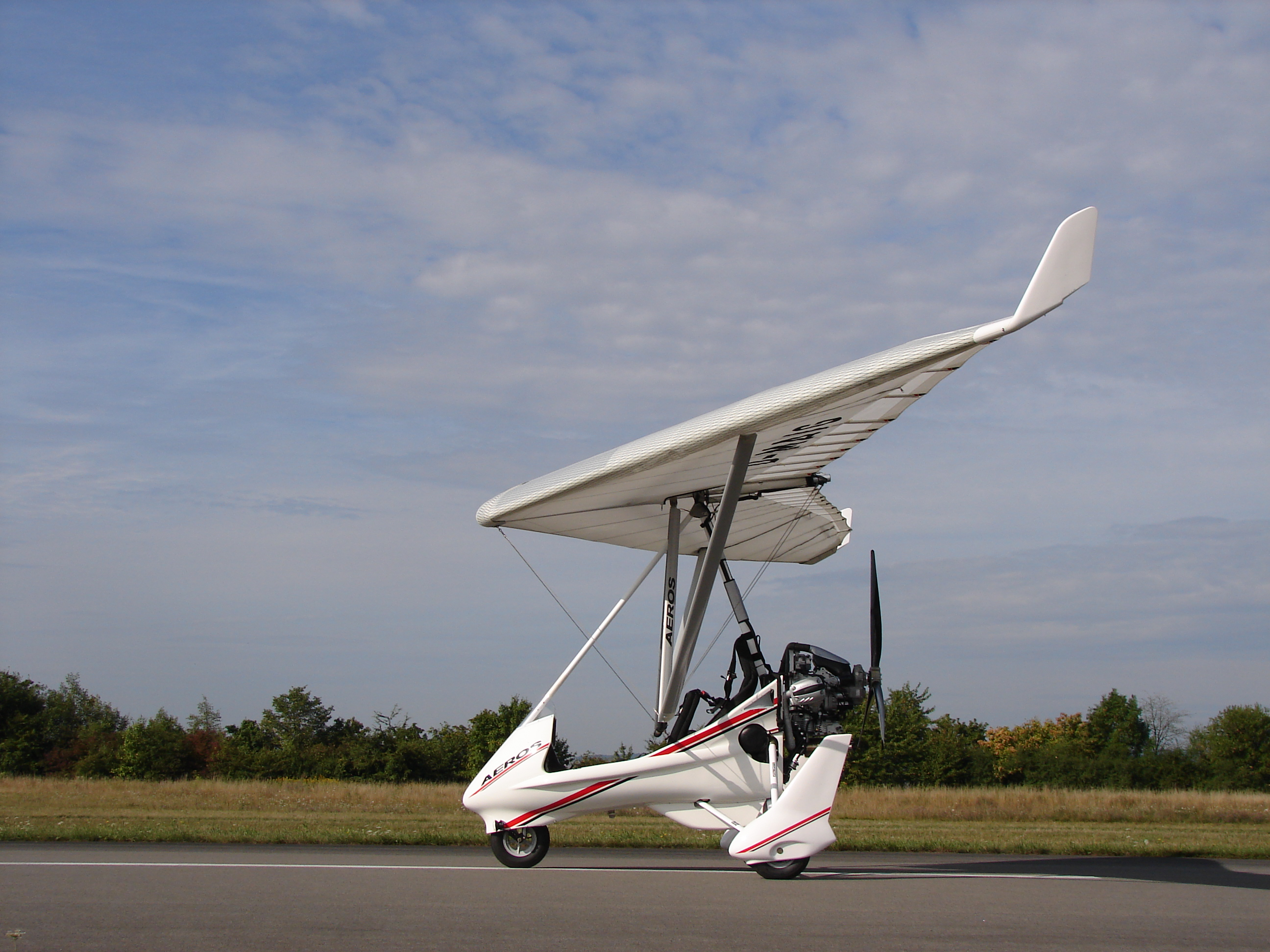
- A Profi TL wing mounted on an Aeros-2 trike

General information
- Type: Ultralight trike wing
- National origin: Ukraine
- Manufacturer: Aeros
- Status: In production (2013)

The Aeros Profi is a Ukrainian high-performance ultralight trike wing, designed and produced by Aeros of Kyiv. The wing is widely used on Aeros trikes as well as by other ultralight aircraft manufacturers.

== Design and development ==
The base model Profi wing is a cable-braced, king post-equipped hang glider-style wing for two-place trikes, while the Profi TL is a "topless" design, lacking the king post and using streamlined lower lift struts instead of wires. The topless design lowers the overall height of the wing and allows storage in lower-roofed hangars. A carbon fibre leading edge insert is optional, while winglets are standard on the TL model.

The wing is made from bolted-together aluminium tubing, with its double surface wing covered in Dacron sailcloth. Its 10 m (32.8 ft) span wing has an area of 14.5 m^{2} (156 sq ft), a nose angle of 128° and uses an "A" frame weight-shift control bar. An electro-mechanical trim is optional.

== Variants ==
Profi
Base model with a king post and cable bracing.
Profi TL
Topless model, lacking the king post, using streamlined lift struts and with standard winglets.

== Applications ==
- Aeros-2
- Aeros Cross Country
- Aeros del Sur Manta
- Apollo Delta Jet
- Apollo Jet Star
- Apollo Monsoon
- Exkluziv Joker

== Specifications (Profi TL) ==
Data from Bayerl and Aeros

General characteristics

- Wingspan: 10 m (32 ft 10 in)
- Wing area: 14.5 m^{2} (156 sq ft)
- Aspect ratio: 6.9:1
- Empty weight: 52 kg (115 lb) wing weight
- Gross weight: 450 kg (992 lb) maximum aircraft gross weight allowed

Performance

- Cruise speed: 125 km/h (78 mph, 67 kn) with trim installed
- Stall speed: 52 km/h (32 mph, 28 kn)
- Never exceed speed: 140 km/h (87 mph, 76 kn)
- g limits: +4/-2
