= Kolb Kolbra =

Kolb Kolbra & King Kolbra

General information
- Type: Ultralight aircraft
- National origin: United States
- Manufacturer: New Kolb Aircraft
- Status: In production
- Number built: King Kolbra - 2 (2003); Kolbra - 2 (2003)

History
- Introduction date: 2000
- First flight: 2000
- Developed from: Kolb Firefly, Kolb Slingshot

The Kolb Kolbra and King Kolbra are a family of American tandem two seater, high wing, strut-braced, pusher configuration, conventional landing gear-equipped ultralight aircraft that are produced in kit form by New Kolb Aircraft of London, Kentucky and intended for amateur construction.

== Design and development ==
The Kolbra was intended as a dual control, ultralight trainer and was created by combining the front half of a Firefly fuselage with the rear fuselage cage of the Slingshot. The front fuselage was then widened by 10.5 in (27 cm) to allow more room for the pilot's feet. The King Kolbra has a wide fuselage front, similar to the Mark III whereas the Kolbra has a pointed nose.

The Kolbra's factory standard engine was the 64 hp (48 kW) Rotax 582 engine, placing it in the Ultralight Trainer category, but it could be equipped with the 80 hp (60 kW) Rotax 912UL or the 80 hp (60 kW) Jabiru 2200 in the Experimental - Amateur-built category. The King Kolbra's standard engine was the Jabiru 2200.

Both aircraft feature a forward fuselage of welded 4130 steel tubing, mated to an aluminum tailboom. The horizontal stabilizer, tail fin and wings are also constructed of riveted aluminum tubing and feature full-span flaperons. All flying surfaces are covered in doped aircraft fabric. The wings and horizontal tail are quick-folding for storage and ground transport. The landing gear is sprung tubing for the main gear, with a steerable sprung tailwheel.

== Variants ==
Kolbra
Two seats in tandem configuration, high wing ultralight, powered by a 64 hp (48 kW) Rotax 582, 80 hp (60 kW) Jabiru 2200 or 80 hp (60 kW) Rotax 912UL engine. Aircraft has a highly pointed nose.
King Kolbra
Two seats in tandem configuration, high wing ultralight, powered by an 80 hp (60 kW) Jabiru 2200 engine. Aircraft has a broad nose.

== Specifications (Kolbra) ==
Data from Kitplanes and Bethea

General characteristics

- Crew: one
- Capacity: one passenger
- Length: 24 ft 0 in (7.32 m)
- Wingspan: 29 ft 0 in (8.84 m)
- Height: 6 ft 10 in (2.08 m)
- Wing area: 156 sq ft (14.5 m^{2})
- Empty weight: 496 lb (225 kg)
- Gross weight: 1,000 lb (454 kg)
- Fuel capacity: 10 US gallons (38 litres)
- Powerplant: 1 × Rotax 582 twin cylinder, two-stroke aircraft engine, 64 hp (48 kW)

Performance

- Maximum speed: 100 mph (160 km/h, 87 kn)
- Cruise speed: 75 mph (121 km/h, 65 kn)
- Stall speed: 35 mph (56 km/h, 30 kn)
- Never exceed speed: 110 mph (180 km/h, 96 kn)
- Range: 180 mi (300 km, 160 nmi)
- g limits: +4/-2
- Rate of climb: 1,000 ft/min (5.1 m/s)

Avionics

- none

== See also ==
Aircraft of comparable role, configuration, and era

- Excalibur Aircraft Excalibur
- Quad City Challenger II
