= Kolb Firestar =

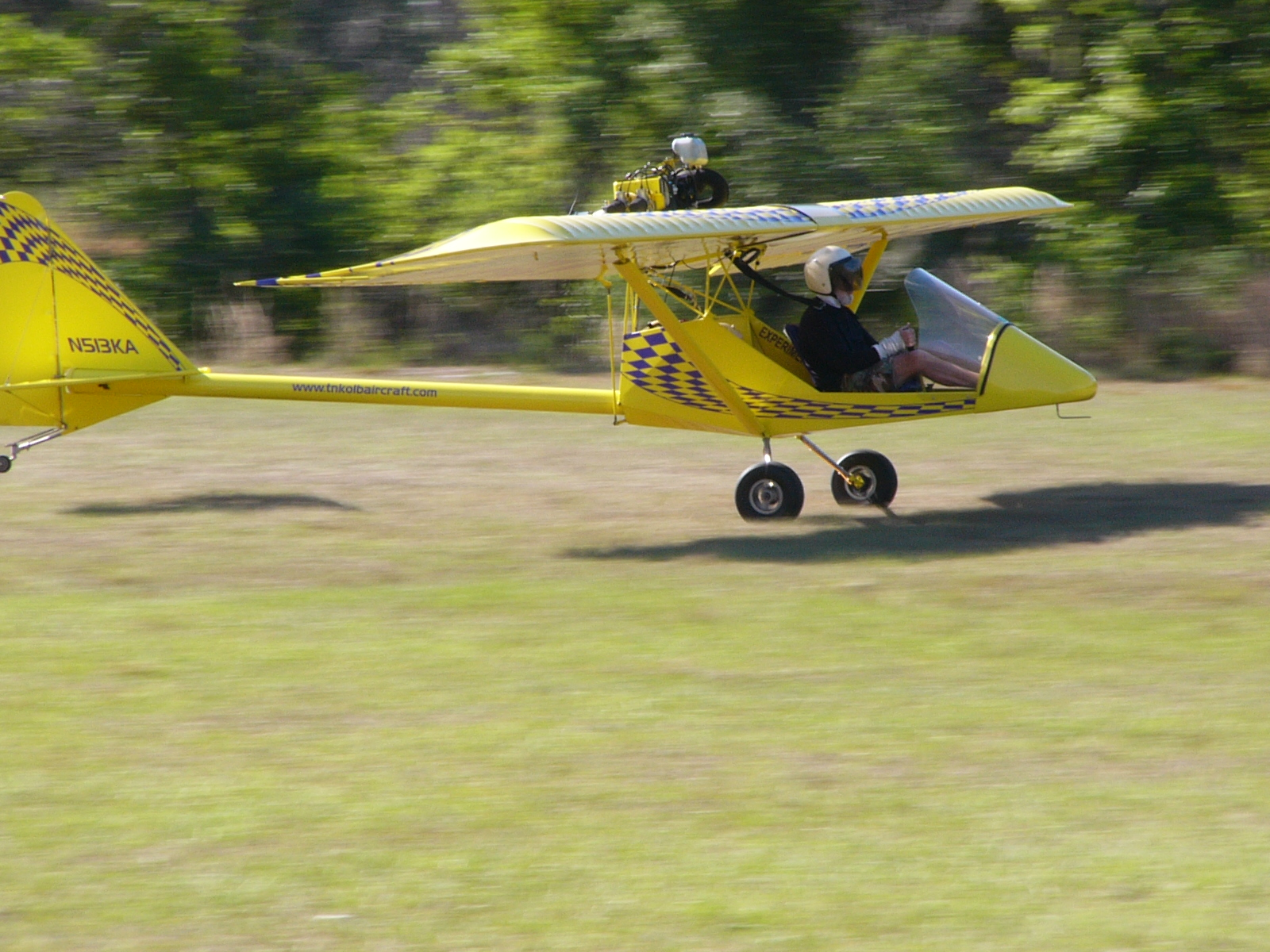
- Kolb Firestar I

General information
- Type: Ultralight aircraft
- National origin: United States
- Manufacturer: New Kolb Aircraft
- Status: In production
- Number built: 3500 (Dec 2011)

History
- Introduction date: 1985
- Variants: Kolb Firefly; Vol Xerpa ULM Pulsar

The Kolb Firestar is a family of American open cockpit, high wing, pusher configuration, conventional landing gear-equipped ultralight aircraft that was produced in kit form by Kolb Aircraft of Phoenixville, Pennsylvania and intended for amateur construction.

The Firestar was designed to comply with the American FAR 103 ultralight regulations, including that category's maximum 254 lb (115 kg) empty weight and was later a developed into the current production Kolb Firefly.

== Design and development ==
The Firestar was intended to be a FAR 103 legal ultralight when powered by the 28 hp (21 kW) Rotax 277 engine. The 40 hp (30 kW) Rotax 447 or the 50 hp (37 kW) Rotax 503 were optional engines, although the aircraft then falls into the US Experimental - amateur-built category.

The design features a forward fuselage of welded 4130 steel tubing, mated to an aluminum tailboom. The horizontal stabilizer, tail fin and wings are also constructed of riveted aluminum tubing with all flying surfaces covered in doped aircraft fabric. The wings are quick-folding for storage and ground transport. The aircraft can be made ready to fly from trailering in eight minutes by one person, without the use of tools.

The landing gear is sprung tubing for the main gear, with a steerable sprung tailwheel.

Factory options originally included removable doors for cool weather flying.

The Firestar II was created using the same fuselage but adding a small jump seat in the baggage area. The seating is very restricted for the rear seat passenger and their legs are placed beside the front seat pilot. There are no dual controls. The wing used on the Firestar II is taken from the Kolb Twinstar Mk III. In 1999 the two seat option added only US$216 to the Firestar I base price.

The Firestar II was developed into the Tandem ultralight trainer, which was introduced in 2000. The Tandem incorporated dual controls to facilitate flight instruction.

In 2012 the company introduced the Firestar II SS, with side-by-side configuration seating.

== Operational history ==
Reviewer Andre Cliche said of the Firestar I: "the Firestar is a well proven ultralight that is held in high esteem by pilots and non-pilots alike. lt probably has something to do with its charming clean lines. It has exceptionally clean aerodynamics and can fly with little power."

Kit builder Woody Spurlock of Percival, Iowa stated: "building the little jewel has been a fun project...we are very pleased with the flying characteristics, it handles beautifully".

== Variants ==
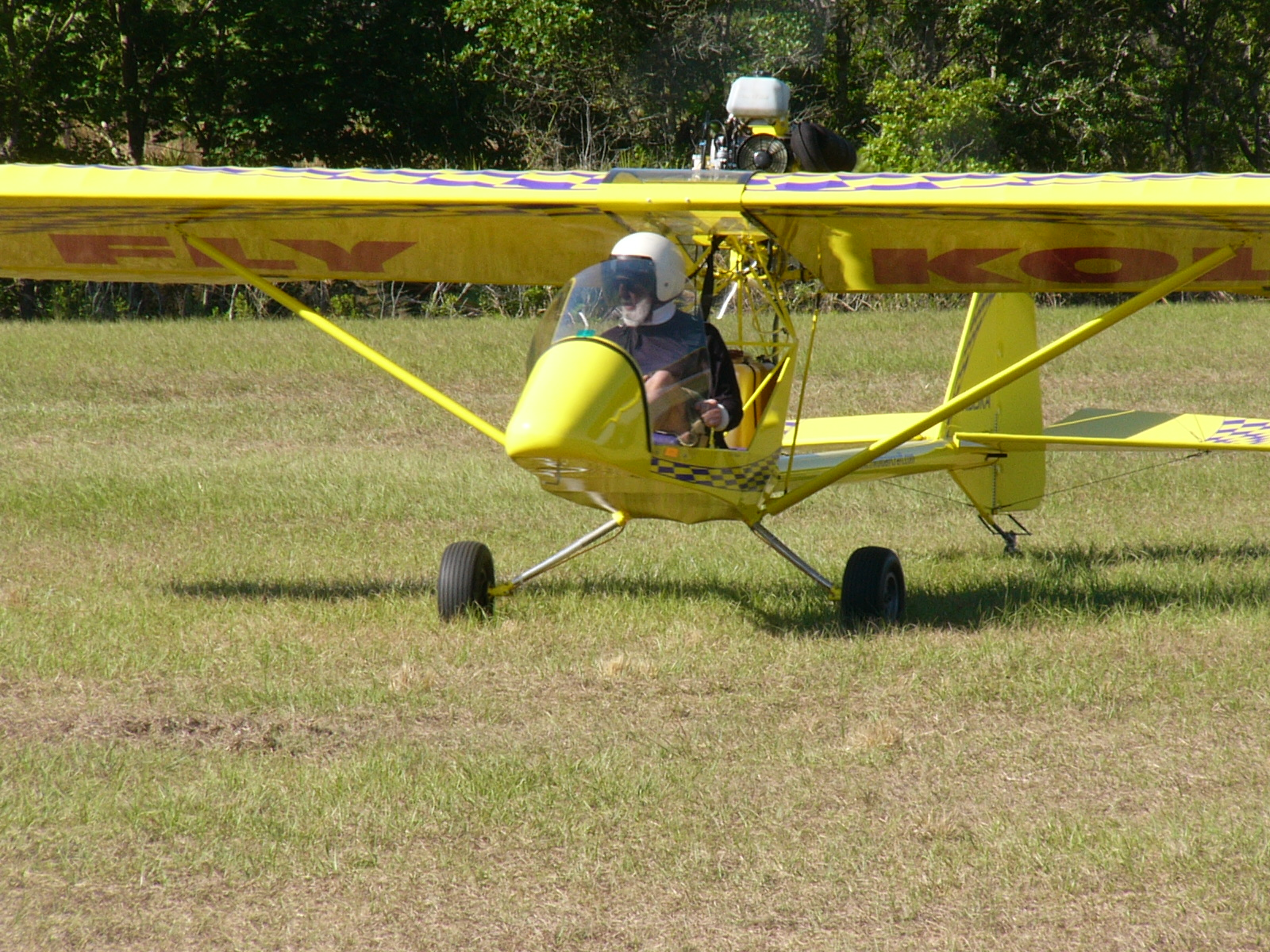
Kolb Firestar I at Sun 'n Fun 2006

Firestar I
Single seat, high wing ultralight, powered by a 28 hp (21 kW) Rotax 277 engine or optionally a 40 hp (30 kW) Rotax 447 or a 50 hp (37 kW) Rotax 503 two stroke engine.
Firestar II
Two seat, high wing ultralight, powered by a 40 hp (30 kW) Rotax 447 or a 50 hp (37 kW) Rotax 503 two stroke engine.
Tandem
Two seat, high wing ultralight trainer, powered by a 64 hp (48 kW) Rotax 582 two stroke, liquid-cooled engine.
Firestar II SS
Two seat side-by-side configuration seating and 50 hp (37 kW) Rotax 503 two stroke engine or optionally a 64 hp (48 kW) Rotax 582 two stroke engine. Introduced in 2012.

== Specifications (Firestar I) ==
Data from Kitplanes, Cliche and Purdy

General characteristics

- Crew: one
- Length: 20 ft 3 in (6.17 m)
- Wingspan: 27 ft 8 in (8.43 m)
- Height: 5 ft 10 in (1.78 m)
- Wing area: 143 sq ft (13.3 m^{2})
- Empty weight: 254 lb (115 kg)
- Gross weight: 550 lb (249 kg)
- Fuel capacity: 5 US gallons (19 litres)
- Powerplant: 1 × Rotax 277 single cylinder, two-stroke aircraft engine, 28 hp (21 kW)

Performance

- Maximum speed: 63 mph (101 km/h, 55 kn)
- Cruise speed: 53 mph (85 km/h, 46 kn)
- Stall speed: 27 mph (43 km/h, 23 kn)
- Never exceed speed: 80 mph (130 km/h, 70 kn)
- Range: 130 mi (210 km, 110 nmi)
- g limits: +4/-2

Avionics

- none

== See also ==
Aircraft of comparable role, configuration, and era

- Capella Javelin
- TEAM Airbike
