= SkyReach BushCat =

South African light-sport aircraft

BushCat
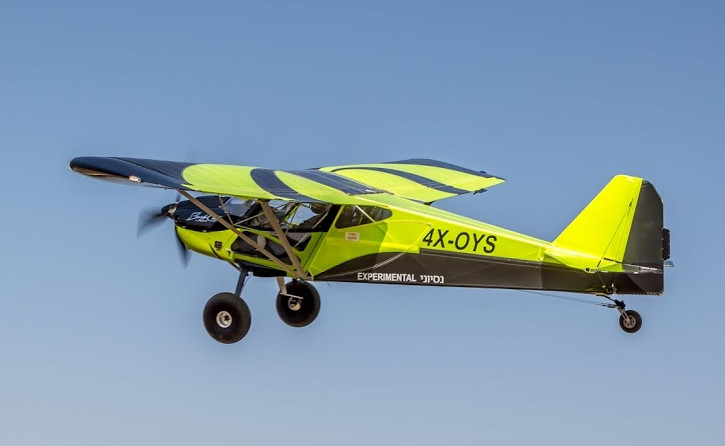

General information
- Type: Light-sport aircraft
- National origin: South Africa
- Manufacturer: SkyReach Aircraft
- Designer: Vladimir Chechin

History
- Developed from: Rainbow Cheetah

The SkyReach BushCat is a South African light-sport aircraft developed from the Rainbow Aircraft Cheetah by Vladimir Chechin of SkyReach Aircraft. The aircraft is supplied as a kit for amateur construction or as a complete ready-to-fly-aircraft.

== Design ==
The BushCat is a two-place side-by-side configuration, strut-braced, high-wing monoplane. The main upgrades from the earlier Cheetah XLS are the use of sprung aluminum landing gear, cockpit ergonomic changes to the location of the stick and throttle and hydraulic disc brakes in place of mechanical drum brakes.

The BushCat's structure is fabric-covered aluminum tube construction. The standard engines used are the 80 hp (60 kW) Rotax 912UL and the 100 hp (75 kW) Rotax 912ULS powerplants. The plane features dual throttles, a single center-mounted control stick and flaps controlled by a ceiling-mounted bar. Landing gear options are tricycle gear, conventional landing gear and floats.

The design is a US Federal Aviation Administration accepted special light-sport aircraft with the Rotax 912UL, Rotax 912ULS, the 85 hp (63 kW) Jabiru 2200 and 64 hp (48 kW) Rotax 582 engines fitted.

== Operational history ==
In April 2018 there were 26 BushCats registered in the United States with the Federal Aviation Administration.

== Specifications (BushCat) ==
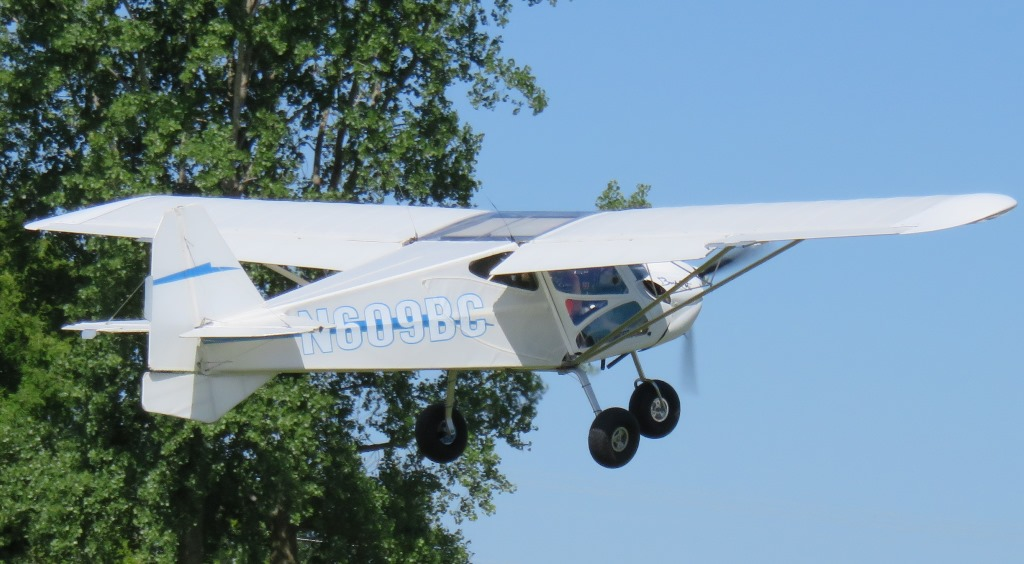
Rainbow Skyreach BushCat

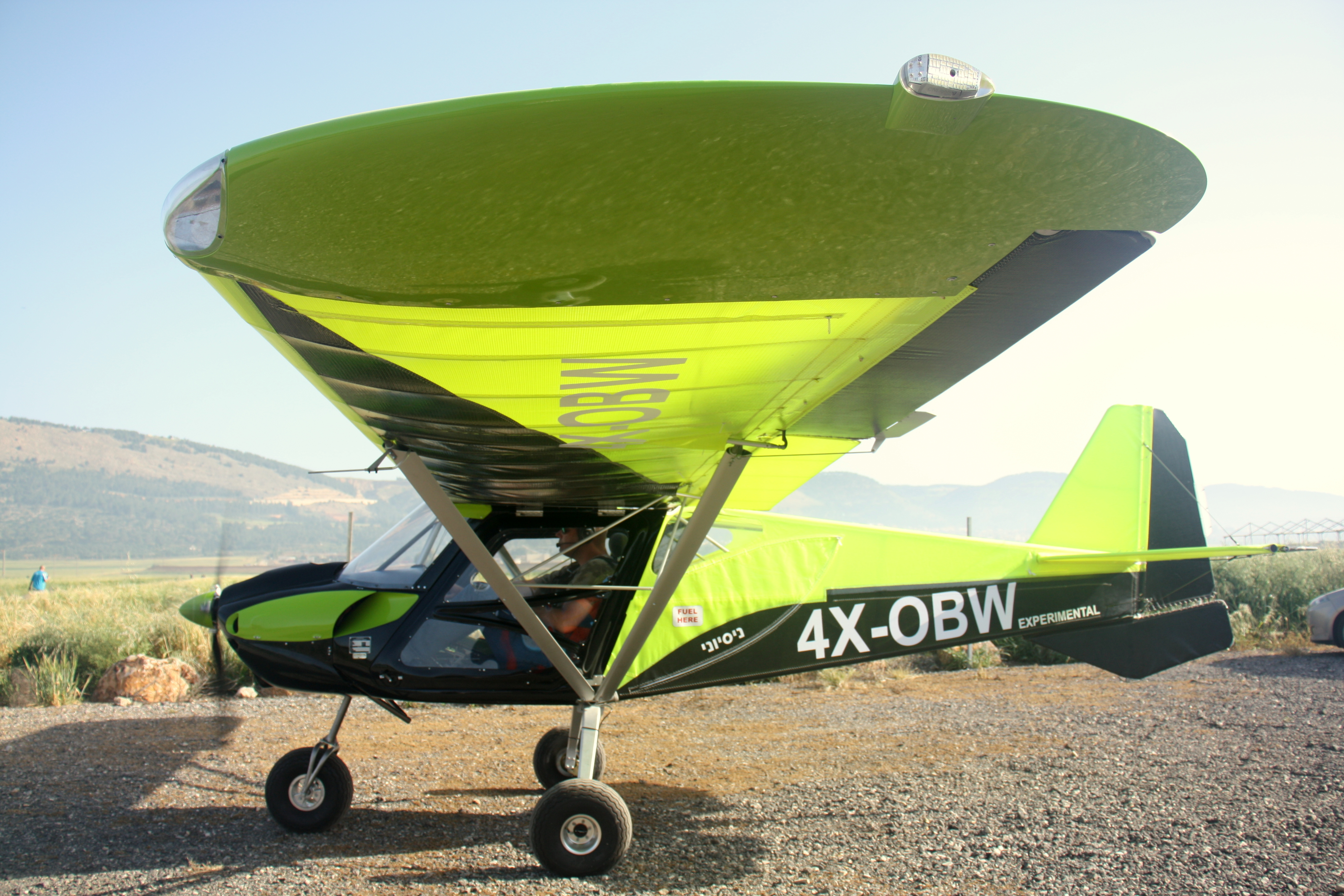
A tricycle landing gear-equipped BushCat

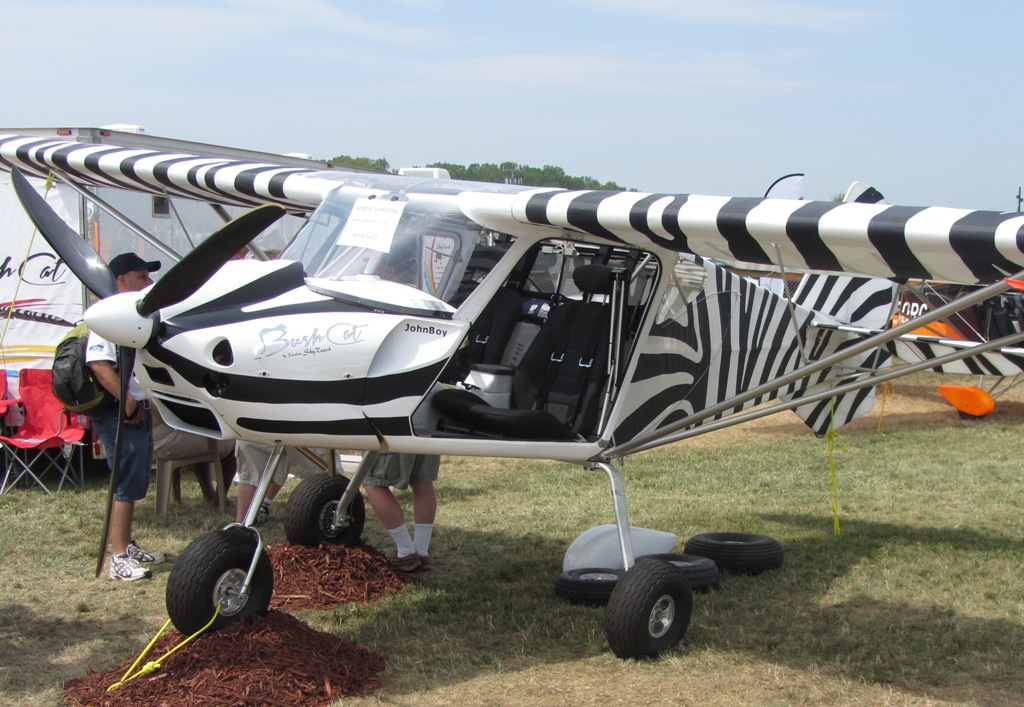
Rainbow Skyreach BushCat on display

Data from Tacke and manufacturer

General characteristics

- Crew: 1
- Capacity: 1 passenger
- Length: 5.7 m (18 ft 8 in)
- Wingspan: 9.6 m (31 ft 6 in)
- Height: 2.3 m (7 ft 7 in)
- Wing area: 13.58 m^{2} (146.2 sq ft)
- Aspect ratio: 6.8:1
- Empty weight: 320 kg (705 lb)
- Gross weight: 560 kg (1,235 lb)
- Fuel capacity: 94 L (25 US gal)
- Powerplant: 1 × Rotax 912ULS , 75 kW (100 hp)
- Propellers: 3-bladed Warp Drive Inc

Performance

- Cruise speed: 137 km/h (85 mph, 76 kn)
- Stall speed: 61 km/h (38 mph, 34 kn) First stage of flaps
- Never exceed speed: 160 km/h (100 mph, 89 kn)
- Range: 1,080 km (670 mi, 580 nmi)
- Service ceiling: 4,300 m (14,000 ft)
- g limits: +6/-4G (ultimate)
- Maximum glide ratio: 10:1
- Rate of climb: 6.1 m/s (1,200 ft/min)
- Wing loading: 41.2 kg/m^{2} (8.4 lb/sq ft)

== See also ==
Related development

- Rainbow Cheetah XLS
