= Rainbow Aerotrike =

Aerotrike

General information
- Type: Ultralight trike
- National origin: South Africa
- Manufacturer: Rainbow Aircraft
- Status: In production
- Number built: 70 (Aerotrike Cobra, 2005)

The Rainbow Aerotrike is a family of South African two-seat ultralight trikes, made by Rainbow Aircraft of Edenvale, Gauteng and available in kit form for amateur construction or fully assembled. The type has been noted for its long-distance flights.

== Design and development ==
The current Aerotrike series comprises two variants of the same basic design, the Scout and Cobra. Both share the same basic design, including the two-seat carriage frame, suspension, steering and folding inverted "V" mast assembly. The Scout is equipped minimally, while the Cobra has many options as standard equipment, including a cockpit pod fairing, windshield, instrument panel, saddle bags and wheel pants.

Both models require 30–40 hours to assemble from the supplied kit.

== Operational history ==
The Aerotrike series were the choice of Mike Blyth for his record long-distance flights. The first in 1995 was from Cape Town, South Africa to North Cape, Norway a distance of 10,255 mi (16,504 km) and the second was an around-the-world flight of 29,000 mi (46,671 km).

== Variants ==
Cobra
Fully equipped version with full cockpit fairing. Standard engine is 80 hp (60 kW) Rotax 912UL four-stroke with the 100 hp (75 kW) Rotax 912ULS optional. It was previously available with the 64 hp (48 kW) Rotax 582 two-stroke powerplant. The standard wing is the Aeros Stream 16.2, with the Aeros Proto 15.5 and La Mouette wings as optional. Standard fuel is 21 U.S. gallons (79 L; 17 imp gal). Still in production, 70 had been completed and flown by 2005.
Naked Cobra
Cobra trike, but without the cockpit fairing included, making the aircraft lighter and less expensive.
Safari
Very basic model without cockpit fairing. Standard engine is 50 hp (37 kW) Rotax 503 with the 64 hp (48 kW) Rotax 582 two-stroke optional. When it was still in production the 74 hp (55 kW) Rotax 618 was available. The standard wing is the Aerotrike Spirit 14.8. Out of production, 45 had been completed and flown as of 2000.
Scout
Basic-equipped version without cockpit fairing, but with suspension. Standard engine is 50 hp (37 kW) Rotax 503 with the 64 hp (48 kW) Rotax 582 two-stroke or 60 hp (45 kW) HKS 700E four-stroke engine optional. When it was still in production the 74 hp (55 kW) Rotax 618 was available as well. The standard wing is the Aerotrike Spirit 14.8, with the Aerotrike Spirit 16.2, La-Mouette Ghost 12.9, La Mouette Ghost 14.9 and La-Mouette Chronos 16 wings as optional. Standard fuel is 13 U.S. gallons (49 L; 11 imp gal). Still in production, 45 had been completed and flown as of 2000.
Spirit
Fully equipped version with full cockpit fairing. Standard engine is 64 hp (48 kW) Rotax 582 two-stroke. Standard fuel is 14 U.S. gallons (53 L; 12 imp gal). No longer in production.

== Specifications (Scout with Spirit 14.8 wing) ==
Data from Cliche and Rainbow Aircraft

General characteristics

- Crew: one
- Capacity: one passenger
- Wingspan: 10.2 m (33 ft 6 in)
- Height: 3.8 m (12 ft 6 in)
- Wing area: 14.8 m^{2} (159 sq ft)
- Empty weight: 154 kg (340 lb)
- Gross weight: 400 kg (882 lb)
- Fuel capacity: 13 U.S. gallons (49 L; 11 imp gal)
- Powerplant: 1 × Rotax 503 , 37 kW (50 hp)
- Propellers: 3-bladed Powerfin

Performance

- Maximum speed: 115 km/h (71 mph, 62 kn)
- Cruise speed: 100 km/h (62 mph, 54 kn)
- Stall speed: 56 km/h (35 mph, 30 kn)
- Never exceed speed: 140 km/h (87 mph, 76 kn)
- Range: 325 km (202 mi, 175 nmi) at 80 km/h
- Service ceiling: 3,000 m (10,000 ft)
- Maximum glide ratio: 8:1
- Rate of climb: 4 m/s (790 ft/min)
- Wing loading: 27 kg/m^{2} (5.5 lb/sq ft)

== See also ==
Aircraft of comparable role, configuration, and era

- Air Creation Racer
