= Microleve ML 450 =

Brazilian ultralight aircraft

ML 450

General information
- Type: Microlight aircraft
- National origin: Brazil
- Manufacturer: Microleve
- Status: Production completed
- Number built: 250 (1998)

The Microleve ML 450 (sometimes ML450) is a Brazilian microlight aircraft that was designed and produced by Microleve of Rio de Janeiro. When it was available the aircraft was supplied as a complete ready-to-fly-aircraft or as a kit for amateur construction.

== Design and development ==
The aircraft features a strut-braced parasol wing, a two-seats-in-side-by-side configuration open or optionally enclosed cockpit, cruciform tail, fixed tricycle landing gear with wheel pants and a small tail skid, and a single engine in pusher configuration.

The aircraft is made from aluminum tubing and composites, with its flying surfaces covered in doped aircraft fabric. Its 10.30 m (33.8 ft) span wing mounts flaps and has a wing area of 16.48 m^{2} (177.4 sq ft). The wing is supported by "V" struts, jury struts and cabane struts. The acceptable power range is 50 to 74 hp (37 to 55 kW) and the standard engines used are the 50 hp (37 kW) Rotax 503, 64 hp (48 kW) Rotax 582 or the 74 hp (55 kW) Rotax 618 powerplant.

The aircraft has a typical empty weight of 220 kg (490 lb) and a gross weight of 445 kg (981 lb), giving a useful load of 225 kg (496 lb). With full fuel of 64 litres (14 imp gal; 17 US gal) the payload for the pilot, passenger and baggage is 179 kg (395 lb).

The manufacturer estimated the construction time from the supplied kit as 250 hours.

== Operational history ==
By 1998 the company reported that 250 aircraft were completed and flying.

Even though the aircraft was marketed in the United States, by January 2014 no examples were registered with the Federal Aviation Administration.

== Specifications (ML 450) ==
Data from AeroCrafter

General characteristics

- Crew: one
- Capacity: one passenger
- Length: 6.84 m (22.44 ft)
- Wingspan: 10.30 m (33.80 ft)
- Wing area: 16.48 m^{2} (177.4 sq ft)
- Empty weight: 220 kg (484 lb)
- Gross weight: 980 kg (2,161 lb)
- Fuel capacity: 64 litres (14 imp gal; 17 US gal)
- Powerplant: 1 × Rotax 618 twin cylinder, liquid-cooled, two stroke aircraft engine, 55 kW (74 hp)
- Propellers: 3-bladed composite, ground adjustable

Performance

- Maximum speed: 160 km/h (100 mph, 87 kn)
- Cruise speed: 110 km/h (70 mph, 61 kn)
- Stall speed: 32 km/h (20 mph, 17 kn)
- Range: 357 km (222 mi, 193 nmi)
- Service ceiling: 3,000 m (10,000 ft)
- Rate of climb: 5.1 m/s (1,000 ft/min)
