= Capella Aircraft =

American homebuilt aircraft manufacturer

Capella Aircraft Corporation
- Company type: Privately held company
- Industry: Aerospace
- Founded: circa 1988
- Defunct: circa 2007
- Fate: Out of business
- Headquarters: Austin, Texas, United States
- Products: Kit aircraft

Capella Aircraft Corporation was an American aircraft manufacturer based in Austin, Texas. Formed about 1988, the company specialized in the design and manufacture of light aircraft in the form of kits for amateur construction, including for the US FAR 103 Ultralight Vehicles rules. The company went out of business about 2007.

Capella produced a number of aircraft designs, all of a strut-braced, high wing configuration. The first series were all enclosed cockpit designs, starting with the Capella SS, a single seat model introduced in 1988. In 1990 the Capella XS two-seat conventional landing gear model followed, along with a tricycle gear model, the Capella XLS. The Capella Fastback was introduced in 1995.

In 1998 the open cockpit single-seat Capella Javelin I was introduced as a FAR 103 ultralight. This was followed by the Capella Javelin II the same year and finally the Capella T-Raptor, all variants of the basic Javelin design.

== Aircraft ==
Summary of aircraft built by Capella Aircraft
Model name	First flight	Number built	Type
Capella SS	1988		Single seat enclosed cockpit homebuilt aircraft
Capella XS	1990		Two seat enclosed cockpit, conventional landing gear, homebuilt aircraft
Capella XLS	1990		Two seat enclosed cockpit, tricycle landing gear, homebuilt aircraft
Capella Fastback	1995		Two seat enclosed cockpit, conventional landing gear, homebuilt aircraft
Capella Javelin I	1998		Single seat open cockpit, conventional landing gear, ultralight aircraft
Capella Javelin II	1998		Two seat open cockpit, conventional landing gear, ultralight trainer
Capella T-Raptor			Two seat semi-open cockpit, conventional landing gear, homebuilt aircraft
