= Acrolite =

Family of Canadian homebuilt aircraft

General information
- Type: Amateur-built aircraft
- National origin: Canada
- Manufacturer: Acrolite Aircraft
- Designer: Ron Wilson
- Status: Plans available (2021)

History
- First flight: October 1986

The Acrolite is a family of Canadian amateur-built aircraft, designed by Ron Wilson and produced by Acrolite Aircraft of Kakabeka Falls, Ontario, in the form of plans for amateur construction.

== Design and development ==
The aircraft in the series all feature one or two seats, fixed conventional landing gear and a single engine in tractor configuration. The Acrolite fuselages are all made from welded 4130 steel tubing, with wooden structure wings covered in hot laminated plywood and control surfaces made from aluminum sheet. All other surfaces are covered in doped aircraft fabric. Wing arrangements, cockpit and engines vary by model.

Aircraft Spruce & Specialty Co supplies plans and materials kits for the Acrolite 1C. The company claims that the 16 airframe-only materials packages cost under US$10,000.

== Operational history ==
The Acrolite 1A won a Canadian Owners and Pilots Association "Good Show" award in 1998 and the Acrolite 1B was chosen as one of two finalists in the 1995 Aircraft Spruce & Speciality Scratchbuild Design Contest.

In March 2017, five examples were registered with Transport Canada, although a total of seven had been once registered.

== Variants ==
Acrolite 1A
Single-seat biplane for the Canadian basic ultralight category, first flown in October 1986. Plans no longer available. The prototype was originally powered by a 38 hp (28 kW) Kawasaki 440 and later by a 40 hp (30 kW) Rotax 447 two-strokes powerplant.
Acrolite 1B
Single-seat biplane for sportsman aerobatics. In addition to the standard wooden wing, optional 2024-T3 aluminum sheet wings can be built. The recommended engine is the 80 hp (60 kW) Rotax 912UL, although the 64 hp (48 kW) Rotax 582or the 120 hp (89 kW) Rotax 618 two-strokes can be used as well.
Acrolite 1C
Single-seat biplane for sportsman aerobatics, with performance improvements over the 1B. Engines include 64 hp (48 kW) Rotax 582, 74 hp (55 kW), Hirth F30 120 hp (89 kW) Rotax 618 two-strokes and the 80 hp (60 kW) Rotax 912UL, the 100 hp (75 kW) Rotax 912ULS four-stroke powerplant.
Acrolite 1M
Single-seat high-wing, strut-braced monoplane. Engines include 40 hp (30 kW) Rotax 447, 50 hp (37 kW) Rotax 503 and the 64 hp (48 kW) Rotax 582 two-strokes or other similar powerplants. Acrolight Aircraft reports that no prototype has been completed or flown by September 2012.
Acrolite 1T
Single-seat triplane for sportsman aerobatics, with wings covered with epoxy fiberglass sheet or optionally plywood. Ailerons are only fitted to the middle wing. Engines include 40 hp (30 kW) Rotax 447, 50 hp (37 kW) Rotax 503 and the 64 hp (48 kW) Rotax 582 two-stroke powerplants.
Acrolite 2M
Two seats in tandem, high-wing strut-braced monoplane intended for the Canadian advanced ultralight category and American light-sport aircraft category, first flown in June 1994. Engines include 64 hp (48 kW) Rotax 582, 74 hp (55 kW) Rotax 618 two-strokes and the 80 hp (60 kW) Rotax 912UL and 85 hp (63 kW) Jabiru 2200 four-stroke powerplants. As of August 2012, the design does not appear on the Federal Aviation Administration's list of approved special light-sport aircraft or on Transport Canada's list of advanced ultralights.

== Specifications (Acrolite 1C) ==
Data from Bayerl and Acrolite Aircraft

General characteristics

- Crew: one
- Length: 5.2 m (17 ft)
- Wingspan: 6.09 m (20 ft 0 in)
- Height: 1.8 m (6 ft)
- Wing area: 12.36 m^{2} (133.0 sq ft)
- Aspect ratio: 8:1
- Airfoil: GA30U-212 semi-symmetrical airfoil or, optionally a GA30U-012 fully symmetrical
- Empty weight: 205 kg (452 lb)
- Gross weight: 362 kg (798 lb)
- Fuel capacity: 34 litres (7.5 imp gal; 9.0 US gal)
- Powerplant: 1 × Rotax 912UL four cylinder, liquid and air-cooled, four stroke aircraft engine, 60 kW (80 hp)

Performance

- Maximum speed: 210 km/h (130 mph, 110 kn)
- Cruise speed: 176 km/h (109 mph, 95 kn)
- Stall speed: 72 km/h (45 mph, 39 kn)
- Never exceed speed: 260 km/h (160 mph, 140 kn)
- Range: 400 km (250 mi, 220 nmi)
- g limits: +6/-4
- Rate of climb: 9 m/s (1,800 ft/min)
- Wing loading: 29.3 kg/m^{2} (6.0 lb/sq ft)
