= Microleve ML 500 =

Brazilian ultralight aircraft

ML 500

General information
- Type: Ultralight aircraft
- National origin: Brazil
- Manufacturer: Microleve
- Designer: Hans Gygax
- Status: Production completed

The Microleve ML 500 is a Brazilian ultralight aircraft that was designed by Swiss engineer Hans Gygax and produced by Microleve of Rio de Janeiro. The aircraft was supplied as a kit for amateur construction or as a complete ready-to-fly-aircraft.

The company appears to be out of business and the aircraft no longer available.

== Design and development ==
The ML 500 complies with the Fédération Aéronautique Internationale microlight rules. It features a strut-braced parasol wing, a two-seats-in-side-by-side configuration enclosed cockpit, fixed tricycle landing gear and a single engine in pusher configuration.

The aircraft is made from bolted-together aluminum tubing, with its flying surfaces covered in Dacron sailcloth and the cockpit enclosure is built from fibreglass. Its 10.3 m (33.8 ft) span wing has an area of 14.7 m^{2} (158 sq ft) and is supported by V-struts and jury struts. The tail is mounted to a small diameter aluminium tube. The standard engine available was the 64 hp (48 kW) Rotax 582 two-stroke powerplant, mounted on the wing trailing edge. The landing gear can be equipped with optional wheel pants.

== Specifications (ML 500) ==
Data from Bayerl and Tacke

General characteristics

- Crew: one
- Capacity: one passenger
- Wingspan: 10.3 m (33 ft 10 in)
- Wing area: 14.7 m^{2} (158 sq ft)
- Empty weight: 225 kg (496 lb)
- Gross weight: 449 kg (990 lb)
- Fuel capacity: 70 litres (15 imp gal; 18 US gal)
- Powerplant: 1 × Rotax 582 twin cylinder, liquid-cooled, two stroke aircraft engine, 48 kW (64 hp)

Performance

- Maximum speed: 140 km/h (87 mph, 76 kn)
- Cruise speed: 90 km/h (56 mph, 49 kn)
- Stall speed: 60 km/h (37 mph, 32 kn)
- Wing loading: 30.5 kg/m^{2} (6.2 lb/sq ft)
