= Rainbow Cheetah XLS =

Cheetah XLS
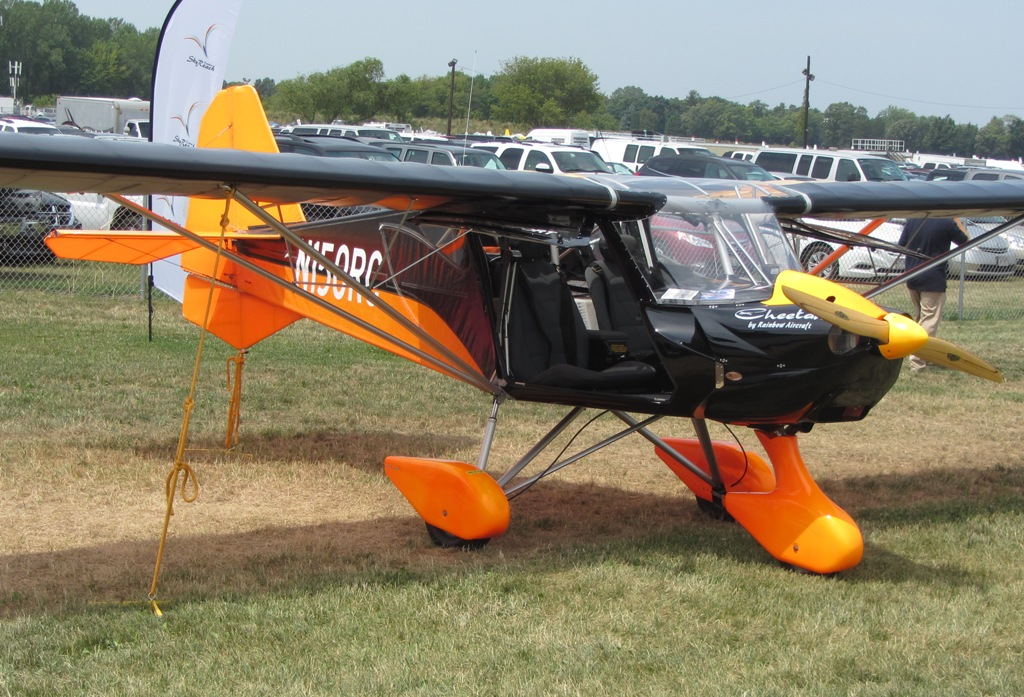

General information
- Type: Light-sport aircraft
- National origin: South Africa
- Manufacturer: Rainbow Aircraft
- Designer: Vladimir Chechin

History
- Developed from: Rainbow Aircraft Cheetah

The Rainbow Cheetah XLS is a light sport aircraft developed from the Rainbow Aircraft Cheetah

== Design ==
The Cheetah XLS is a two-place side-by-side strut braced high-wing monoplane with tricycle landing gear. The fuselage is constructed of aluminum tubing with fabric covering. The aircraft is configured for a Rotax 582, Rotax 912UL, Rotax 912ULS, or Jabiru 2200 engine installation.

== Specifications (Cheetah XLS) ==
Data from Manufacturer

General characteristics

- Crew: 1
- Capacity: 1 passenger
- Fuel capacity: 94l

Performance

== See also ==
Related development

- Rainbow Skyreach Bush Cat
