= Capella XS =

American ultralight aircraft

Capella XS family

General information
- Type: Kit aircraft
- National origin: United States
- Manufacturer: Capella Aircraft Corporation
- Status: Production completed

History
- Introduction date: 1988

The Capella XS is a family of American high wing, tractor configuration, cabin aircraft that were produced in kit form by Capella Aircraft of Austin, Texas and intended for amateur construction.

Capella Aircraft went out of business in late 2007, and the series is no longer in production.

== Design and development ==
The single seat SS model was introduced in 1988. All members of the design family were available as optionally conventional landing gear or tricycle gear-equipped aircraft.

The family of aircraft all share common design features, including an enclosed cabin-style fuselage, horizontal stabilizer and tail fin all constructed of welded 4130 steel tubing. The wing is framed from riveted aluminium tubing with all surfaces covered in doped aircraft fabric. The wing includes flaps and has an optional folding system for transport and storage.

The landing gear arrangement includes sprung-steel main gear and a similarly sprung steerable tail wheel or optional sprung-steel nose wheel.

The single-seat SS model was developed into a line of side-by-side two seaters with different engine and fuselage designs.

== Variants ==
SS
Single seat cabin light aircraft with a gross weight of 625 lb (283 kg) and powered by a 40 hp (30 kW) Rotax 447 or a 50 hp (37 kW) Rotax 503 engine. The fuselage incorporates a rear window. First flown in 1988.
XS
Two seats in side-by-side configuration cabin light aircraft with a gross weight of 1,200 lb (544 kg) and powered by a 64 hp (48 kW) Rotax 582 engine. The fuselage incorporates a rear window. First flown in 1990.
XLS
Two seats in side-by-side configuration cabin light aircraft with a gross weight of 1,200 lb (544 kg) and powered by an 80 hp (60 kW) Rotax 912 four-stroke engine. The fuselage incorporates a rear window. First flown in 1990.
XLS Super 100
Two seats in side-by-side configuration cabin light aircraft with a gross weight of 1,270 lb (576 kg) and powered by a 100 hp (75 kW) Rotax 912S four-stroke engine. Available in TR tricycle gear and TD taildragger models. The fuselage incorporates a rear window.
Fastback
Two seats in side-by-side configuration cabin light aircraft with a gross weight of 1,200 lb (544 kg) and powered by an 80 hp (60 kW) Rotax 912 four-stroke engine. First flown in 1995. Fuselage differs from the XS in that the rear window is eliminated and replaced with a high rear turtle deck, rendering the aircraft similar in appearance to a Piper J-3 Cub, Aeronca Champ or Taylorcraft B.

== Specifications (XS) ==
Data from Kitplanes and Purdy

General characteristics

- Crew: one
- Capacity: one passenger
- Length: 18 ft 5 in (5.61 m)
- Wingspan: 28 ft 6 in (8.69 m)
- Height: 5 ft 8 in (1.73 m)
- Wing area: 114 sq ft (10.6 m^{2})
- Empty weight: 480 lb (218 kg)
- Gross weight: 1,200 lb (544 kg)
- Fuel capacity: 11 US gallons (42 litres)
- Powerplant: 1 × Rotax 582 twin cylinder, two-stroke aircraft engine, 64 hp (48 kW)

Performance

- Maximum speed: 135 mph (217 km/h, 117 kn)
- Cruise speed: 111 mph (179 km/h, 96 kn)
- Stall speed: 41 mph (66 km/h, 36 kn) 36 mph in landing configuration, flaps down.
- Range: 275 mi (443 km, 239 nmi)
- Service ceiling: 10,000 ft (3,000 m)
- Rate of climb: 1,200 ft/min (6.1 m/s)

== See also ==
Aircraft of comparable role, configuration, and era

- Murphy Rebel
