= Microleve Corsario =

Brazilian amphibious ultralight flying boat

Corsario
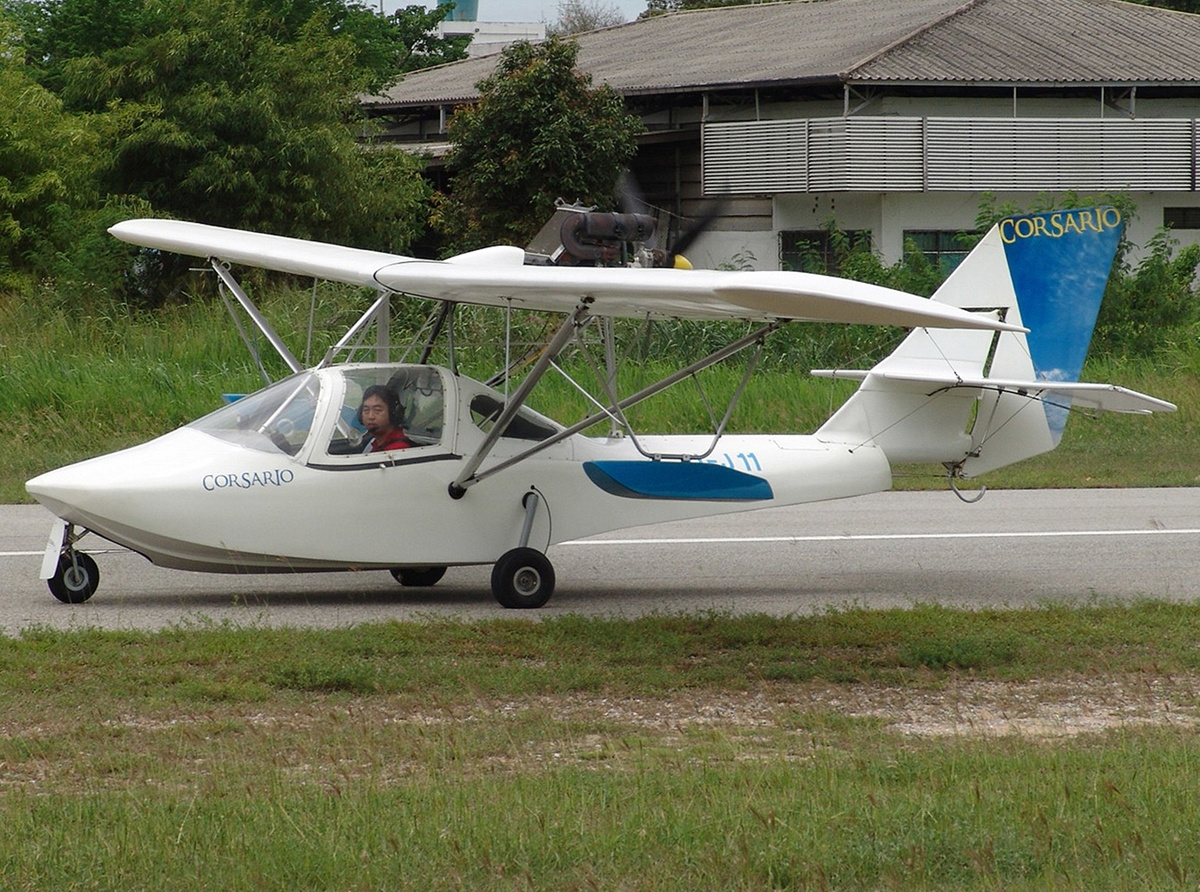

General information
- Type: Ultralight flying boat
- National origin: Brazil
- Manufacturer: Microleve
- Status: Production completed

History
- Introduction date: 1988

The Microleve Corsario (English: Corsair) is a Brazilian amphibious ultralight flying boat that was designed and produced by Microleve of Rio de Janeiro. The aircraft was supplied as a kit for amateur construction.

The company appears to be out of business and the aircraft no longer available.

== Design and development ==
The Corsario complies with the Fédération Aéronautique Internationale microlight rules. It features a strut-braced parasol wing, a two-seats-in-side-by-side configuration enclosed cockpit, retractable conventional landing gear and a single engine in pusher configuration. The landing gear is manually retracted.

The aircraft fuselage and hull are made from composites. The Mark 5 version of the Corsario offered two alternative wings. An all-composite wing of 10.3 m (33.8 ft) span could be ordered with two 25 litres (5.5 imp gal; 6.6 US gal) fuel tanks fitted behind the seats in the fuselage or an aluminum tubing and aircraft fabric wing of similar span was available with two 35 litres (7.7 imp gal; 9.2 US gal) wing mounted fuel tanks. Standard engines available from the factory were the 64 hp (48 kW) Rotax 582 or 74 hp (55 kW) Rotax 618 two-strokes or the 80 hp (60 kW) Rotax 912UL four-stroke powerplant.

== Specifications (Corsario Mark 5, tube and fabric wings) ==
Data from Bayerl & Tacke

General characteristics

- Crew: one
- Capacity: one passenger
- Wingspan: 10.3 m (33 ft 10 in)
- Empty weight: 247 kg (545 lb)
- Gross weight: 525 kg (1,157 lb)
- Fuel capacity: two 35 litres (7.7 imp gal; 9.2 US gal) wing mounted fuel tanks, a total of 70 litres (15 imp gal; 18 US gal)
- Powerplant: 1 × Rotax 912UL four cylinder, liquid and air-cooled, four stroke aircraft engine, 60 kW (80 hp)
- Propellers: 3-bladed composite

Performance

- Maximum speed: 160 km/h (99 mph, 86 kn)
- Cruise speed: 120 km/h (75 mph, 65 kn)
- Stall speed: 48 km/h (30 mph, 26 kn)
