= Vol Xerpa ULM Pulsar =

Spanish ultralight aircraft

ULM Pulsar

General information
- Type: Ultralight aircraft
- National origin: Spain
- Manufacturer: Vol Xerpa
- Status: In production (2015)

History
- Developed from: Kolb Firestar II

The Vol Xerpa ULM Pulsar is a Spanish ultralight aircraft produced by Vol Xerpa of Barcelona. The aircraft is supplied as a kit for amateur construction or as a complete ready-to-fly-aircraft.

== Design and development ==
The Pulsar is a development of the conventional landing gear-equipped Kolb Firestar II and was designed to comply with the Fédération Aéronautique Internationale microlight rules. It features a strut-braced high-wing, a two-seats-in-side-by-side configuration enclosed or open cockpit, fixed tricycle landing gear with wheel pants and a single engine in tractor configuration.

The aircraft is made from bolted-together aluminum tubing, with its flying surfaces covered in doped aircraft fabric. Its 9.2 m (30.2 ft) span wing has an area of 14.75 m^{2} (158.8 sq ft) and includes a folding feature to facilitate ground transportation or storage. The standard engine available is the 64 hp (48 kW) Rotax 582 two-stroke powerplant.

The standard version has only a windshield, but a fully enclosed cockpit fairing is available.

== Specifications (Pulsar) ==
Data from Bayerl and Tacke

General characteristics

- Crew: one
- Capacity: one passenger
- Wingspan: 9.2 m (30 ft 2 in)
- Wing area: 14.75 m^{2} (158.8 sq ft)
- Empty weight: 205 kg (452 lb)
- Gross weight: 450 kg (992 lb)
- Fuel capacity: 60 litres (13 imp gal; 16 US gal)
- Powerplant: 1 × Rotax 582 two cylinder, liquid-cooled, two stroke aircraft engine, 48 kW (64 hp)

Performance

- Maximum speed: 165 km/h (103 mph, 89 kn)
- Cruise speed: 120 km/h (75 mph, 65 kn)
- Stall speed: 55 km/h (34 mph, 30 kn)
- Rate of climb: 6 m/s (1,200 ft/min)
- Wing loading: 30.5 kg/m^{2} (6.2 lb/sq ft)
