= Precision Tech Fergy =

Precision Tech Fergy F-II B

General information
- Type: Ultralight aircraft
- National origin: United States
- Manufacturer: Ferguson Aircraft; Precision Tech Aircraft
- Designer: Bill Ferguson
- Status: No longer in production
- Number built: 40 (2001)

History
- Manufactured: 1991-c2002
- Introduction date: 1991
- Developed from: Kolb Mark III

The Precision Tech Fergy F-II B is a two-seat side-by-side, conventional landing gear, strut-braced, high-wing, pusher configuration ultralight aircraft that was manufactured by Ferguson Aircraft and later Precision Tech Aircraft in kit form for amateur construction. The aircraft is out of production and no longer available.

== Design and development ==
The Fergy was developed from the Kolb Mark III and introduced to the market in 1991. Reviewer Andre Cliche describes it as a "clone", whilst Noel Bertrand et al. claim it was "inspired by the Kolb Twinstar". The aircraft differs from the Kolb design in that it has a revised cockpit pod, with centerline-hinged doors and a square-tipped rudder. The horizontal stabilizer was also raised a few inches to give better ground clearance.

The aircraft is constructed from aluminium tubing, covered with aircraft fabric. The wings fold for storage or trailering. The standard engine supplied with the kit was the 50 hp (37 kW) Rotax 503, with the liquid-cooled 64 hp (48 kW) Rotax 582 optional, although the Fergie can accept engines that range in output from 50 to 80 hp (37 to 60 kW).

The average construction time from the kit was reported by the manufacturer as 350 hours and 40 had been completed by 2001.

== Operational history ==
The Fergie won the Grand Champion title at Sun 'n Fun in 1991.

== Specifications (Precision Tech Fergy) ==
Data from Kitplanes and Cliche

General characteristics

- Crew: one
- Capacity: one passenger
- Length: 18 ft 8 in (5.7 m)
- Wingspan: 29 ft 6 in (8.99 m)
- Wing area: 140 sq ft (13 m^{2})
- Empty weight: 400 lb (181 kg)
- Gross weight: 1,000 lb (454 kg)
- Fuel capacity: 12.5 US gallons (47 litres)
- Powerplant: 1 × Rotax 503 twin-cylinder, two-stroke aircraft engine, 50 hp (37 kW)
- Propellers: 3-bladed ground adjustable

Performance

- Maximum speed: 90 mph (140 km/h, 78 kn)
- Cruise speed: 75 mph (121 km/h, 65 kn)
- Stall speed: 28 mph (45 km/h, 24 kn)
- Range: 220 mi (350 km, 190 nmi)
- Rate of climb: 1,000 ft/min (5.1 m/s)
- Wing loading: 7.14 lb/sq ft (34.9 kg/m^{2})

Avionics

- none

== See also ==
Related development

- Kolb Mark III
