= SkyReach Aircraft =

South African light sport aircraft manufacturer

Rainbow SkyReach (Pty) Ltd
- Company type: Private company
- Industry: Aerospace
- Founder: Mike Blyth
- Headquarters: Dal Fouche, Springs, Gauteng, South Africa
- Key people: Former Chief Engineer & Designer: Vladimir Chechin
- Products: Light-sport aircraft Ultralight aircraft
- Website: www.fly-skyreach.com

Original Rainbow Aircraft company logo

Rainbow SkyReach (Pty) Ltd is a South African aircraft manufacturer based at the Springs Airfield in Dal Fouche, Springs, Gauteng. It was formerly known as Rainbow Aircraft (Pty) Ltd. The company specialises in the design and manufacture of fixed-wing Light-sport aircraft.

The company was founded by Mike Blyth in South Africa as Rainbow Aircraft (Pty) Ltd. Vladimir Chechin came as a visitor to the country from Russia in 1994 and decided to immigrate, finding work at Blyth's company. In 2002 Chechin purchased the company from Blyth.

The company's name was changed to Rainbow SkyReach (Pty) Ltd in the 2010s and the Rainbow Cheetah was developed into the SkyReach BushCat.

In May 2024, the company announced that it would stop manufacturing new aircraft. However, it would continue on as a maintenance organisation to service the existing fleet, both locally as well as supplying parts internationally. In November of the same year, it was announced that the company would cease trading, and the company Inteliectual Property and manufacturing rights had been bought by Bushcat Aircraft Australia.

== Aircraft ==
Summary of aircraft built by Rainbow Aircraft and SkyReach
Model name	First flight	Number built	Type
Rainbow Aerotrike Cobra		70 (2005)	Ultralight trike
Rainbow Aerotrike Safari		45 (2000)	Ultralight trike
Rainbow Aerotrike Scout		45 (2000)	Ultralight trike
Rainbow Aerotrike Spirit			Ultralight trike
Rainbow Cheetah			Fixed-wing Light-sport aircraft
Rainbow Cheetah XLS	2012		Fixed-wing light-sport aircraft
SkyReach BushCat	2014		Fixed-wing light-sport aircraft
