= Kolb Aircraft Company =

American aircraft manufacturer

- Company type: Private company
- Industry: Aerospace
- Founded: 1980
- Founder: Homer Kolb
- Headquarters: London, Kentucky, United States
- Key people: CEO, Charles May
- Products: Kit aircraft
- Website: kolbaircraft.com

Kolb Aircraft Company is an American aircraft manufacturer that produces kitplanes for amateur construction.

== History ==
Homer Kolb first flew his initial commercial design, the Kolb Flyer, in 1970. The aircraft was ahead of its time and so Kolb waited until the ultralight aircraft boom of 1980 to incorporate his company, The Kolb Aircraft Company. Initially located in Phoenixville, Pennsylvania the company marketed a wide range of kit aircraft and achieved considerable commercial success, delivering over 3000 aircraft.

In 1999 the company was sold to a group of investors, moved to London, Kentucky and renamed The New Kolb Aircraft Company. The new company introduced a powered parachute model for a short time, the Kolb Flyer Powered Parachute.

In 2003 New Kolb Aircraft introduced the Canadian-designed Ultravia Pelican Sport 600 into the US market in partnership with Ultravia Aero from Canada and Brazil's Flyer Indústria Aeronáutica. When Ultravia went out of business in 2006 Kolb purchased Ultravia's assets, including the Pelican design. The company then improved and developed the Pelican into the Kolb Flyer Super Sport.

In March 2012 the company was sold to Bryan Melborn and renamed Kolb Aircraft Company, LLC.

== Aircraft ==
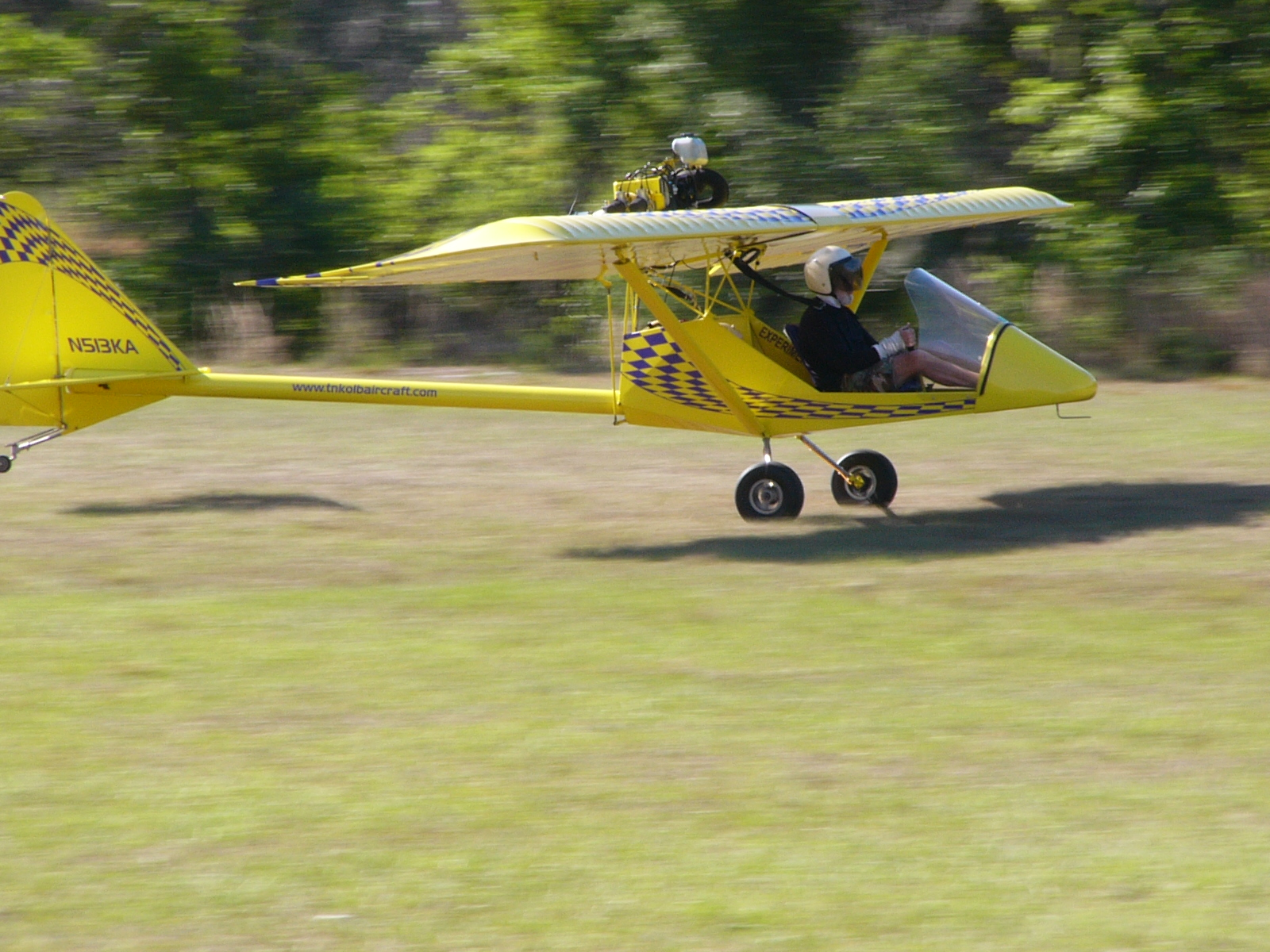
Kolb Firestar

Model name	First flight	Number built	Type
Flyer	1970		Single seat ultralight aircraft
Ultrastar	1982		Single seat ultralight aircraft
Firefly			Single seat ultralight aircraft
Firestar			Single seat ultralight aircraft
Mark III			Two seat ultralight aircraft
Mark III Xtra			Two seat ultralight aircraft
Slingshot			Two seat ultralight aircraft
Kolbra	2000		Two seat ultralight aircraft
King Kolbra	2000		Two seat ultralight aircraft
Flyer Powered Parachute	2001		Single seat powered parachute
Kolb Pelican	2003	over 700	Two seat light sport aircraft
Kolb Flyer Super Sport	2006		Two seat light sport aircraft
