= Rotax 618 =

Austrian two-stroke aircraft engine

618
- Type: Piston aero-engine
- National origin: Austria
- Manufacturer: Rotax
- Major applications: Murphy Renegade; Blue Yonder Merlin

The Rotax 618 is a 73.8 hp (55 kW) two-stroke, two-cylinder, liquid cooled, gear reduction-drive engine that was formerly manufactured by BRP-Rotax GmbH & Co. KG. It was designed for use on ultralight aircraft.

== Development ==
The 618 features liquid-cooled cylinder heads and cylinders with a rotary valve inlet and an exhaust valve. Cooling is via one or two externally mounted radiators. Lubrication is by use of pre-mixed fuel and oil at 50:1 or oil injection. The 618 has dual Ducati capacitor discharge ignition systems and is equipped with two piston-type carburetors. It uses a manifold-driven pneumatic fuel pump to provide fuel pressure.

The engine's propeller drive is via a Rotax type C or E style gearbox. The standard engine includes a muffler exhaust system and an intake silencer and filter, with an after muffler also available to further reduce engine noise. The standard starter is an electric starter. An integral alternating current generator produces 12 volts and 200 watts.

The Rotax 618 is no longer in production.

== Applications ==
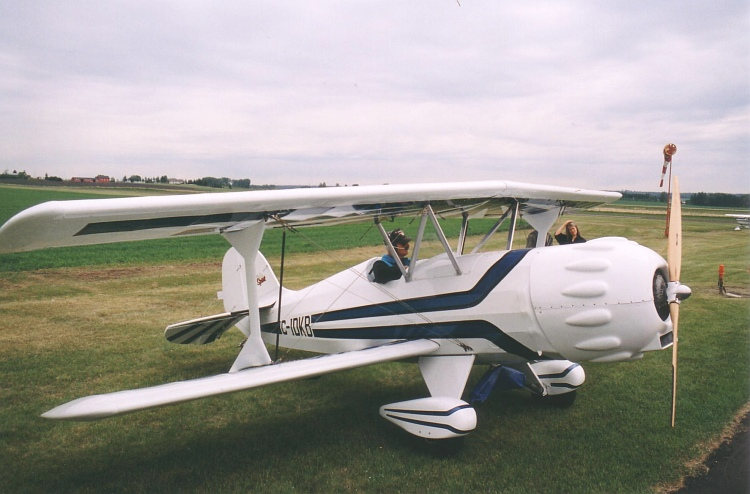
Murphy Renegade Spirit biplane powered by a Rotax 618

- Acrolite
- ARV Griffin
- Bede BD-5
- Blue Yonder Merlin
- Earthstar Thunder Gull JT2
- Early Bird Jenny
- Fletcher Hercules
- Joplin Tundra
- Kolb Mark III
- Kolb Slingshot
- Laron Wizard
- Microleve Corsario
- Microleve ML 450
- M-Squared Breese
- Murphy Renegade
- Quicksilver GT500
- Rainbow Aerotrike
- Sea-Bow International Sea-Bow
- Titan Tornado

== Specifications (Rotax 618) ==
=== General characteristics ===
- Type: 2-cylinder, 2-stroke, rotary valve, oil-in-fuel or oil-injected lubrication, dual carburetors, dual ignition
- Bore: 76 mm (2.99 in)
- Stroke: 68 mm (2.68 in)
- Displacement: 617 cm³ (37.65 cu in)
- Dry weight: 59.1 kg 130.4 lb with electric starter, two carburetors, radiator, intake silencer, exhaust system and E gearbox

=== Components ===
- Valvetrain: rotary inlet valve, exhaust valve
- Fuel type: premium unleaded: RON 90 octane or higher leaded or unleaded or AVGAS 100 LL
- Oil system: oil-in-fuel (pre-mix) at 50:1
- Cooling system: liquid cooled

=== Performance ===
- Power output: 55 kW 73.4 HP SAE @ 6750 RPM
- Power-to-weight ratio: 0.56 hp/lb (1.07 kg/kW)

== See also ==
- Rotax aircraft engines
