= Microleve =

Brazilian aircraft manufacturer

- Company type: Private company
- Industry: Aerospace
- Founded: 1982
- Defunct: circa 2011
- Headquarters: Rio de Janeiro, Brazil
- Products: Ultralight aircraft

Microleve was a Brazilian aircraft manufacturer based in Rio de Janeiro. Founded in 1982 at the beginning of the ultralight boom years, the company appears to have gone out of business in about 2011. The company specialized in the design and manufacture of ultralight aircraft.

Microleve was the first microlight manufacturer in Brazil and for many years was the largest manufacturer of ultralight aircraft in Latin America. The company exported its own designs and also imported designs by other companies, notably those of Tecnam of Italy.

== Aircraft ==
Summary of aircraft built by Microleve
Model name	First flight	Number built	Type
Microleve Corsario			amphibious flying boat
Microleve ML 450			ultralight aircraft
Microleve ML 500			ultralight aircraft
