= Capella Javelin =

American ultralight aircraft

General information
- Type: Ultralight aircraft
- National origin: United States
- Manufacturer: Capella Aircraft Corporation
- Status: Production completed

History
- Introduction date: 1999

The Capella Javelin is a family of American open cockpit, high wing, tractor configuration, conventional landing gear-equipped ultralight aircraft that were produced in kit form by Capella Aircraft of Austin, Texas and intended for amateur construction.

The single seat Javelin I was designed to comply with the American FAR 103 ultralight regulations, including that category's maximum 254 lb (115 kg) empty weight.

Capella Aircraft went out of business in late 2007, and the type is no longer in production.

== Design and development ==
The Javelin was introduced circa 1999 and was intended to appeal to pilots who wanted to experience totally open-air flight.

The design features an open frame fuselage of welded 4130 steel tubing, with the pilot's and passenger's seats bolted to the frame. The horizontal stabilizer and tail fin are also constructed of welded steel tubes. The wing is framed from riveted aluminium tubing with all flying surfaces covered in doped aircraft fabric. The wing is equipped with full span ailerons.

The conventional landing gear includes sprung-steel main gear and a similarly sprung steerable tail wheel. The open cockpit design provides good visibility while taxiing.

The standard engine supplied by the manufacturer for the single seat version was the 28 hp (21 kW) Rotax 277, but it was reported that the aircraft was underpowered with that engine installed. The throttle control is of a unique motorcycle grip type.

Original factory kit options included a cockpit pod and windshield, brakes and steel tube powder coating.

The single-seat Javelin was developed into a tandem two seater, designated the Javelin II and then further developed into the T-Raptor ultralight trainer. The T-Raptor uses a wider and more enclosed fuselage, with optional bubble-windowed doors, to allow cool weather flying and was intended to be marketed to ultralight schools.

== Variants ==
Javelin I
Single seat open cockpit ultralight powered by a 28 hp (21 kW) Rotax 277 engine.
Javelin II
Two seats-in-tandem open cockpit ultralight trainer powered by a 50 hp (37 kW) Rotax 503 engine. It was reported as being in development in 1998 and forecast to be available at the end of 1998.
T-Raptor
Two seats-in-tandem ultralight trainer powered by a 50 hp (37 kW) Rotax 503, 64 hp (48 kW) Rotax 582 or 60 hp (45 kW) HKS 700E four stroke engine. The T-Raptor has an expanded-width steel cage to provide a more enclosed cockpit and is a development of the Javelin II.

== Specifications (Javelin I) ==
Data from Cliche, Kitplanes and Purdy

General characteristics

- Crew: one
- Length: 18 ft 0 in (5.49 m)
- Wingspan: 28 ft 0 in (8.53 m)
- Height: 6 ft 0 in (1.83 m)
- Wing area: 112 sq ft (10.4 m^{2})
- Empty weight: 240 lb (109 kg)
- Gross weight: 575 lb (261 kg)
- Fuel capacity: 5 US gallons (19 litres)
- Powerplant: 1 × Rotax 277 single cylinder, two-stroke aircraft engine, 28 hp (21 kW)

Performance

- Maximum speed: 63 mph (101 km/h, 55 kn)
- Cruise speed: 60 mph (97 km/h, 52 kn)
- Stall speed: 26 mph (42 km/h, 23 kn)
- Range: 140 mi (220 km, 120 nmi)
- Service ceiling: 12,500 ft (3,800 m)
- Rate of climb: 400 ft/min (2.0 m/s)

Avionics
none

== See also ==
Aircraft of comparable role, configuration, and era

- Kolb Firefly
- Kolb Firestar
- TEAM Airbike
