= Kolb Firefly =

American ultralight airplane

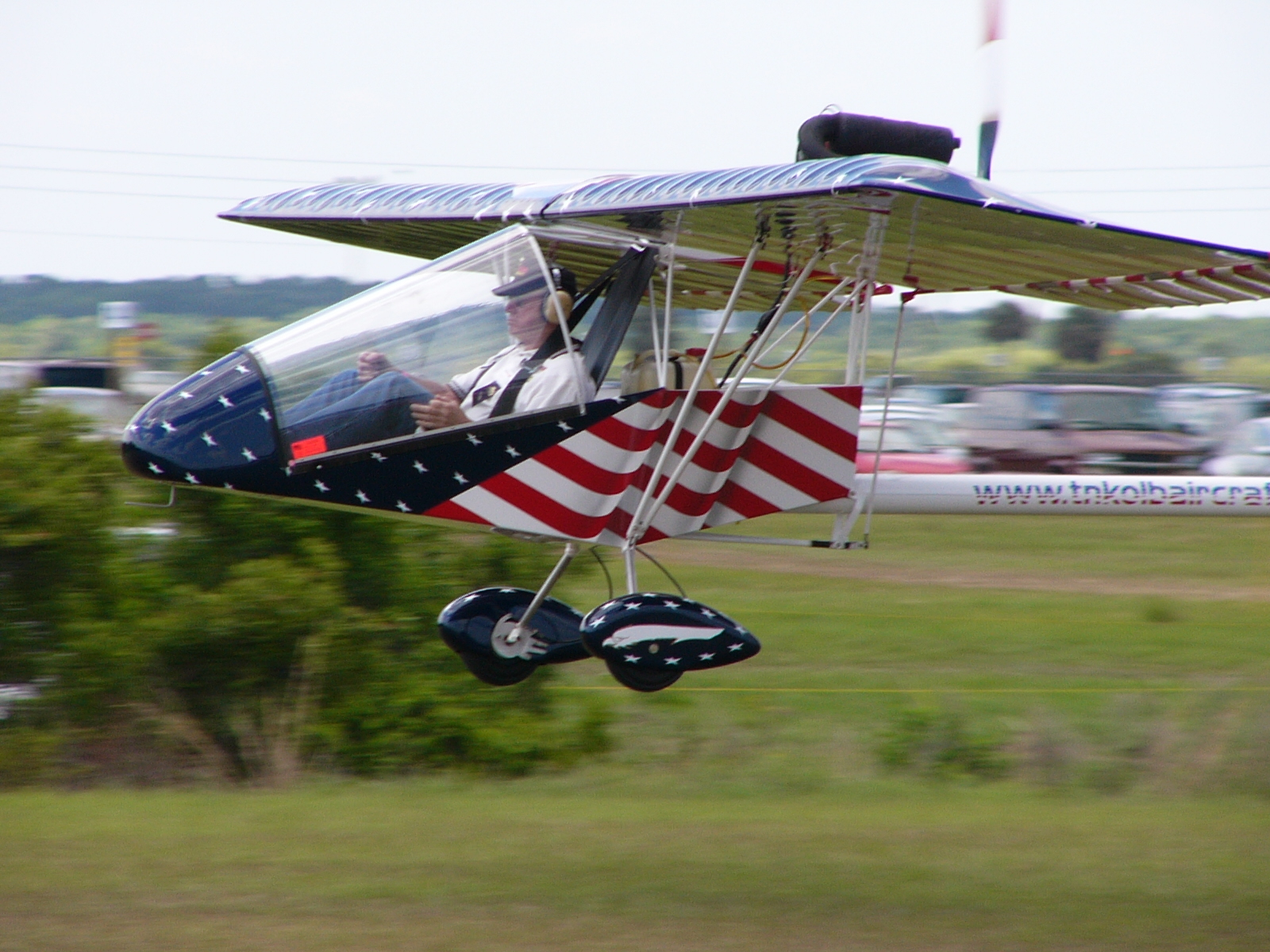
- Kolb Firefly

General information
- Type: Ultralight aircraft
- National origin: United States
- Manufacturer: New Kolb Aircraft
- Status: In production
- Number built: 500 (Dec 2011)

History
- Introduction date: 1995
- Developed from: Kolb Firestar

The Kolb Firefly is an American open cockpit, single seat, high wing, pusher configuration, conventional landing gear-equipped ultralight aircraft that is produced in kit form by New Kolb Aircraft of London, Kentucky and intended for amateur construction. The aircraft was designed in 1995.

The Firefly is a development of the Kolb Firestar and was designed to comply with the American FAR 103 ultralight regulations, including that category's maximum 254 lb (115 kg) empty weight.

== Design and development ==
The Firefly was intended to be a FAR 103 legal ultralight that was powered by the heavier 40 hp (30 kW) Rotax 447 engine. The 28 hp (21 kW) Rotax 277 engine was also an option when the aircraft was first offered.

The design features a forward fuselage of welded 4130 steel tubing, mated to an aluminum tailboom. The horizontal stabilizer, tail fin and wings are also constructed of riveted aluminum tubing with all flying surfaces covered in doped aircraft fabric. The wings are quick-folding for storage and ground transport.

The factory kit options include a complete cockpit enclosure, brakes, quick build option, Ballistic Recovery Systems parachute and steel tube powder coating.

== Specifications (Firefly) ==
Data from Cliche and Kitplanes

General characteristics

- Crew: one
- Length: 19 ft 6 in (5.94 m)
- Wingspan: 22 ft 0 in (6.71 m)
- Height: 5 ft 10 in (1.78 m)
- Wing area: 117 sq ft (10.9 m^{2})
- Empty weight: 253 lb (115 kg)
- Gross weight: 500 lb (227 kg)
- Fuel capacity: 5 US gallons (19 litres)
- Powerplant: 1 × Rotax 447 twin cylinder, two-stroke aircraft engine, 40 hp (30 kW)

Performance

- Maximum speed: 70 mph (110 km/h, 61 kn)
- Cruise speed: 60 mph (97 km/h, 52 kn)
- Stall speed: 26 mph (42 km/h, 23 kn)
- Rate of climb: 1,000 ft/min (5.1 m/s)

Avionics

- none

== See also ==
Aircraft of comparable role, configuration, and era

- Capella Javelin
- TEAM Airbike
