= Rainbow Cheetah =

South African ultralight aircraft

Cheetah
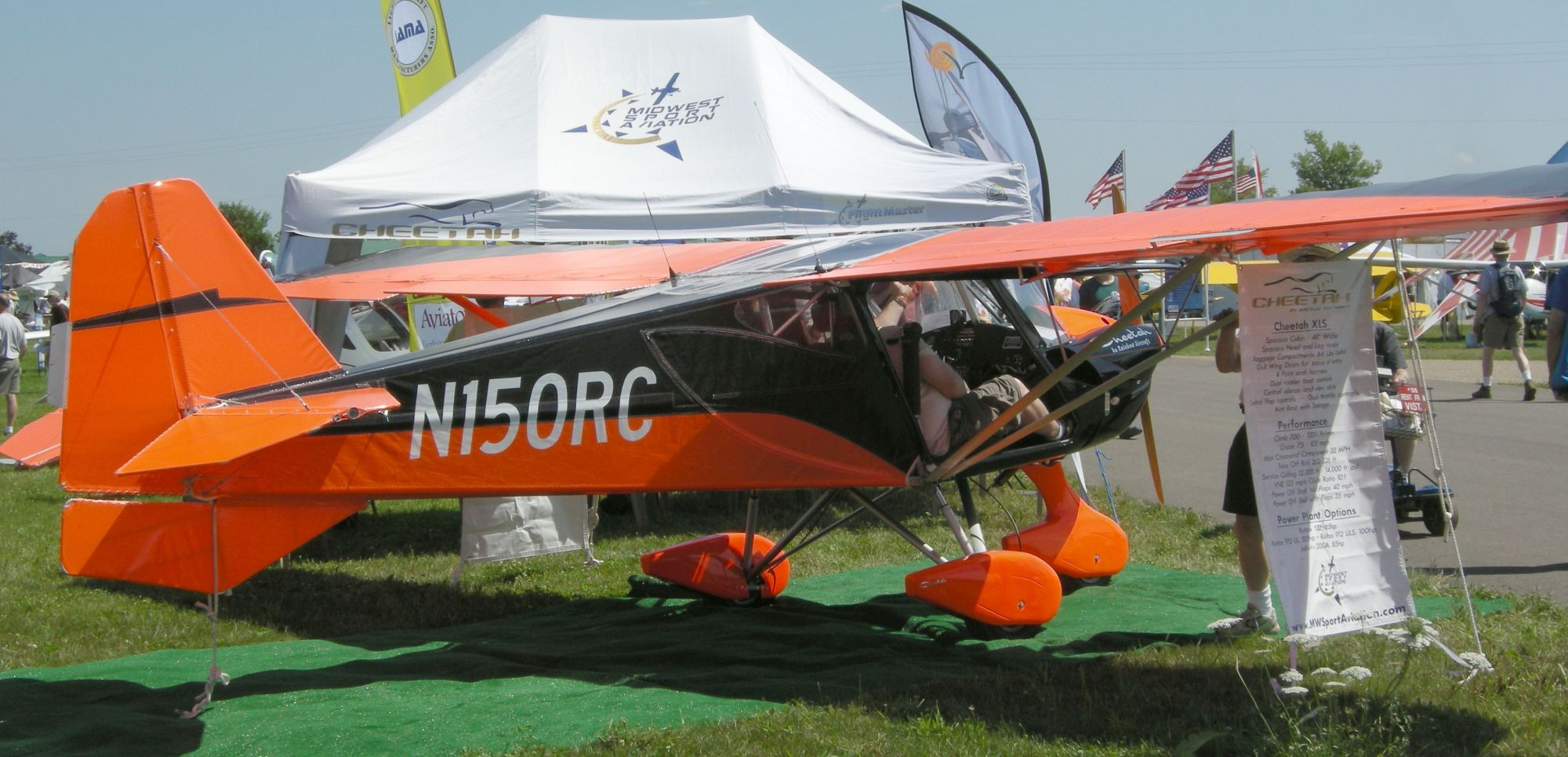

General information
- Type: Ultralight aircraft and Light-sport aircraft
- National origin: South Africa
- Manufacturer: Rainbow Aircraft
- Designer: Vladimir Chechin
- Status: In production (2012)

History
- Developed from: Best Off Skyranger
- Variant: Rainbow Cheetah XLS

The Rainbow Cheetah is a South African ultralight and light-sport aircraft, designed by Vladimir Chechin and produced by Rainbow Aircraft. The aircraft is supplied as a kit for amateur construction or as a complete ready-to-fly-aircraft.

== Design and development ==
The aircraft was derived from the Best Off Skyranger and designed to comply with Canadian Advanced Ultralight criteria and the US light-sport aircraft rules. It features a strut-braced high-wing, a two-seats-in-side-by-side configuration enclosed cockpit with optional doors for access, fixed tricycle landing gear or optionally conventional landing gear and a single engine in tractor configuration.

The aircraft is made from bolted-together aluminum tubing, with its flying surfaces covered in Dacron sailcloth. Its 9.6 m (31.5 ft) span wing has an area of 13.25 m^{2} (142.6 sq ft) and mounts flaps. Standard engines available are the 64 hp (48 kW) Rotax 582 two-stroke, the 80 hp (60 kW) Rotax 912UL and the 100 hp (75 kW) Rotax 912ULS four-stroke powerplants.

The Cheetah XLS has been accepted by Transport Canada as an Advanced Ultralight as both a land plane and seaplane, powered by the Rotax 582 two-stroke, the Rotax 912UL, the Rotax 912ULS, the Verner VM133 and the 85 hp (63 kW) Jabiru 2200A engines.

== Operational history ==
By August 2012 there were three Cheetahs on the Federal Aviation Administration registry and two on the Transport Canada Civil Aircraft Register.

== Variants ==
Cheetah XLS
Current production model (2012) with tricycle landing gear.
Cheetah XLS Taildragger
Current production model (2012) with conventional landing gear.

== Specifications (Cheetah XLS) ==
Data from Bayerl and manufacturer

General characteristics

- Crew: one
- Capacity: one passenger
- Length: 5.67 m (18 ft 7 in)
- Wingspan: 9.6 m (31 ft 6 in)
- Height: 1.9 m (6 ft 3 in) to top of wing
- Wing area: 13.25 m^{2} (142.6 sq ft)
- Aspect ratio: 7.01
- Empty weight: 248 kg (547 lb)
- Gross weight: 560 kg (1,235 lb)
- Fuel capacity: 100 litres (22 imp gal; 26 US gal)
- Powerplant: 1 × Rotax 912UL four cylinder, liquid and air-cooled, four stroke aircraft engine, 60 kW (80 hp)

Performance

- Maximum speed: 177 km/h (110 mph, 96 kn)
- Cruise speed: 135 km/h (84 mph, 73 kn)
- Stall speed: 56 km/h (35 mph, 30 kn) flaps down
- Never exceed speed: 201 km/h (125 mph, 109 kn)
- Range: 1,080 km (670 mi, 580 nmi) with reserves
- Endurance: 7.5 hours
- g limits: +6g/-4g
- Maximum glide ratio: 10:1
- Rate of climb: 5.3 m/s (1,040 ft/min)
- Wing loading: 42.3 kg/m^{2} (8.7 lb/sq ft)
