= Kolb Slingshot =

American ultralight airplane

General information
- Type: Ultralight aircraft
- National origin: United States
- Manufacturer: New Kolb Aircraft
- Status: Production completed (2014)

The Kolb Slingshot is an American tandem two seat, high wing, strut-braced, pusher configuration, conventional landing gear-equipped ultralight aircraft, that was produced in kit form by New Kolb Aircraft of London, Kentucky and intended for amateur construction.

By mid-2014, the company was no longer offering the model for sale and production had ended.

== Design and development ==
The Slingshot was designed as a two-seat ultralight with a small wing and high cruise speed for the installed power, capable of delivering speeds comparable to a general aviation aircraft without the associated cost or complexity. The standard engine was originally the 64 hp (48 kW) Rotax 582 engine, but the 50 hp (37 kW) Rotax 503, 74 hp (55 kW) Rotax 618, 80 hp (60 kW) Rotax 912UL and 80 hp (60 kW) or 2si twin engine packs have been installed. In its home country the aircraft is normally licensed in the Experimental - amateur-built category.

The design features a forward fuselage of welded 4130 steel tubing, mated to an aluminum tailboom. The horizontal stabilizer, tail fin and wings are also constructed of riveted aluminum tubing with all flying surfaces covered in doped aircraft fabric. The wings and horizontal tail are quick-folding for storage and ground transport. The Slingshot can be made ready to fly from trailering in 15 minutes.

The long conventional landing gear consist of sprung tubing for the main gear, with a steerable sprung tailwheel.

The company described the Slingshot's two seat capabilities, "the rear passenger seat is designed for average size people, up to 175 pounds. The seating arrangement has the passenger's legs overlapping the pilot's seat. This allows the fuselage to be shorter and more compact. It also saves a lot of weight.".

== Operational history ==
In reviewing the aircraft Andre Cliche said:

This tandem two-seater is a really hot little racer with a short speedwing and an oversized engine.

== Specifications (Slingshot) ==
Data from Kitplanes, Cliche and Purdy

General characteristics

- Crew: one
- Capacity: one passenger
- Length: 19 ft 0 in (5.79 m)
- Wingspan: 22 ft 0 in (6.71 m)
- Height: 6 ft 9 in (2.06 m)
- Wing area: 110 sq ft (10 m^{2})
- Empty weight: 345 lb (156 kg)
- Gross weight: 850 lb (386 kg)
- Fuel capacity: 10 US gallons (38 litres)
- Powerplant: 1 × Rotax 582 twin cylinder, two-stroke aircraft engine, 64 hp (48 kW)

Performance

- Maximum speed: 100 mph (160 km/h, 87 kn)
- Cruise speed: 87 mph (140 km/h, 76 kn)
- Stall speed: 39 mph (63 km/h, 34 kn)
- Never exceed speed: 125 mph (201 km/h, 109 kn)
- g limits: +4/-2
- Rate of climb: 1,300 ft/min (6.6 m/s)

Avionics

- none

== See also ==
Aircraft of comparable role, configuration, and era

- Excalibur Aircraft Excalibur
- Quad City Challenger II
