= Kolb Mark III =

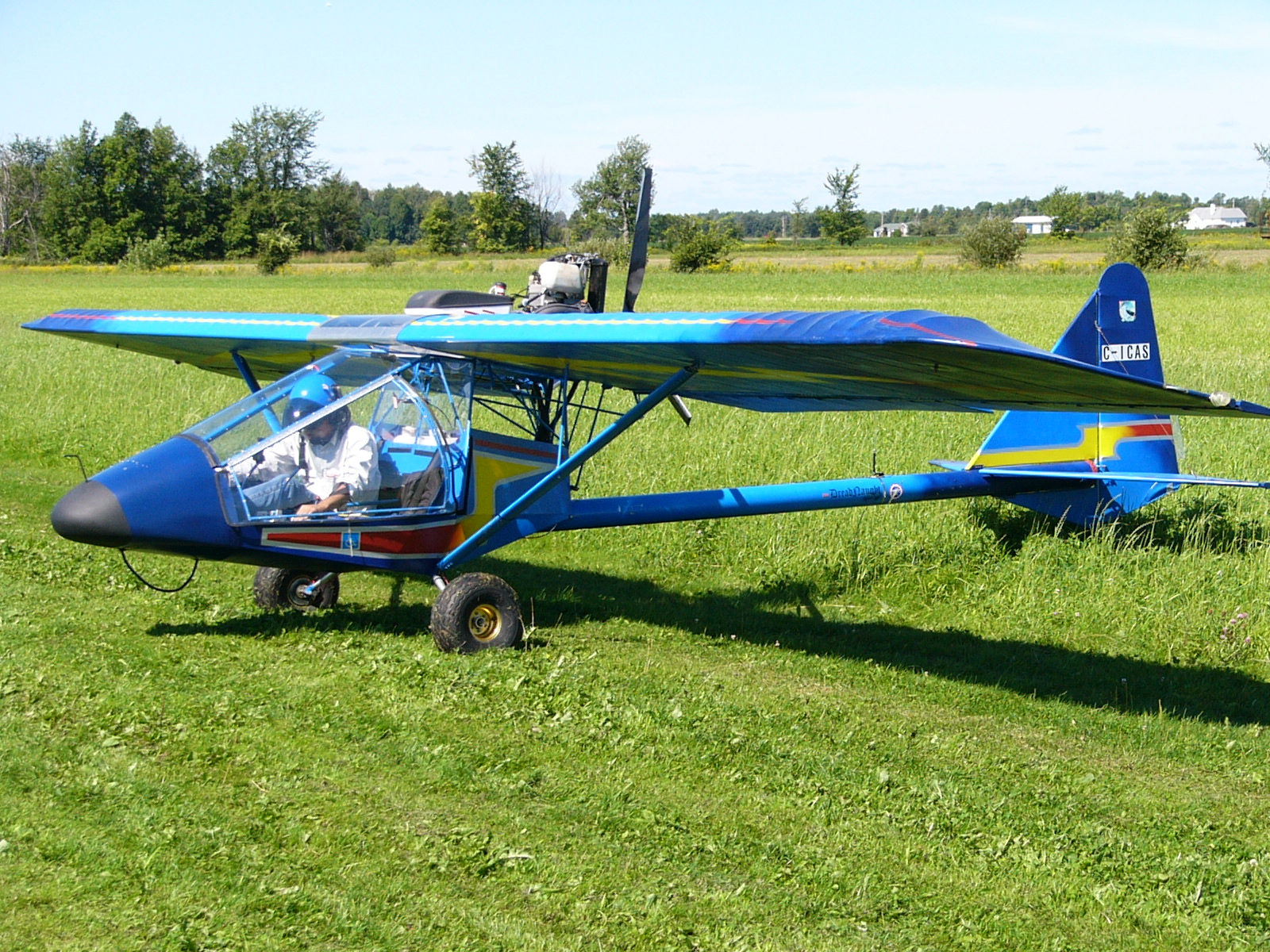
- Kolb Mark III

General information
- Type: Ultralight aircraft
- National origin: United States
- Manufacturer: New Kolb Aircraft
- Status: In production
- Number built: 100 (Dec 2011)

History
- Variant: Precision Tech Fergy

The Kolb Mark III is a family of American side-by-side two seater, high wing, strut-braced, pusher configuration, conventional landing gear-equipped ultralight aircraft that is produced in kit form by New Kolb Aircraft of London, Kentucky, and intended for amateur construction.

== Design and development ==
The Mark III's standard engine was originally the 64 hp (48 kW) Rotax 582 engine, but the current engines offered are the 80 hp (60 kW) Rotax 912UL or the 100 hp (75 kW) Rotax 912ULS. In its home country the aircraft is normally licensed in the Experimental - amateur-built category.

The design features a forward fuselage of welded 4130 steel tubing, mated to an aluminum tailboom. The horizontal stabilizer, tail fin and wings are also constructed of riveted aluminum tubing with all flying surfaces covered in doped aircraft fabric. The wings and horizontal tail are quick-folding for storage and ground transport. The original Mark III can be made ready to fly from trailering in eight minutes by one person without the use of tools, while the newer M3X variant is rated at 15 minutes to assemble for flight.

The landing gear is sprung tubing for the main gear, with a steerable sprung tailwheel and the cabin is 45 in (114 cm) in width.

Factory options include brakes, Ballistic Recovery Systems airframe parachute and powder coating of the steel parts. The manufacturer describes the aircraft as STOL, with a 200 ft (61 m) take-off run.

== Operational history ==
In reviewing the aircraft Andre Cliche said:

The Twinstar Mk III is a very clean and aerodynamic design. lt looks fast and flies fast. With standard dual controls, it can be used as a trainer, but it is most often used as a cross-country cruiser. It is especially desirable for its folding wings.

== Variants ==
Mark III
Two seats in side-by-side configuration, high wing ultralight, powered by a 50 hp (37 kW) Rotax 503, 64 hp (48 kW) Rotax 582, 74 hp (55 kW) Rotax 618 or 80 hp (60 kW) Rotax 912UL engine. Variously marketed at different times as the Mark III, Twinstar and Mark III Classic.
Mark III Xtra
Two seats in side-by-side configuration, high wing ultralight, powered by an 80 hp (60 kW) Rotax 912UL engine, the 100 hp (75 kW) Rotax 912ULS or the 85 hp (63 kW) Jabiru 2200. The Xtra underwent an aerodynamic cleanup by aerodynamicist Barnaby Wainfan and was introduced in 1999. Variously marketed as the Mark III Xtra and the M3X.

== Specifications (Mark III) ==
Data from Kitplanes, Cliche and Purdy

General characteristics

- Crew: one
- Capacity: one passenger
- Length: 22 ft 6 in (6.86 m)
- Wingspan: 30 ft 0 in (9.14 m)
- Height: 6 ft 2 in (1.88 m)
- Wing area: 160 sq ft (15 m^{2})
- Empty weight: 450 lb (204 kg)
- Gross weight: 1,000 lb (454 kg)
- Fuel capacity: 10 US gallons (38 litres)
- Powerplant: 1 × Rotax 582 twin cylinder, two-stroke aircraft engine, 64 hp (48 kW)

Performance

- Maximum speed: 85 mph (137 km/h, 74 kn)
- Cruise speed: 75 mph (121 km/h, 65 kn)
- Stall speed: 33 mph (53 km/h, 29 kn)
- Never exceed speed: 90 mph (140 km/h, 78 kn)
- Range: 130 mi (210 km, 110 nmi)
- Rate of climb: 950 ft/min (4.8 m/s)

Avionics

- none

== See also ==
Related development

- Precision Tech Fergy

Aircraft of comparable role, configuration, and era

- Quad City Challenger II
