= Warner (surname) =

Warner is an English surname which was brought from the Norman French Warnier, and derived from the Old Norse Verner or Wærn. The name ultimately derived from the Germanic name Warinheri which composes of the elements warin meaning 'guard' and heri meaning 'army'. Notable people with this surname include the following:

== Surname ==
- Aidan Warner, American football player
- Albert Warner (1884–1967), American film executive, one of the founders of Warner Bros. Studios
- Albert Warner (umpire) (1921–?), South African cricket umpire
- Alexander Warner (1827–1914), American businessman and politician
- Alf Warner (born 1979), English footballer
- Amelia Warner (born 1982), British actress
- Amos Griswold Warner (1861–1900), American social worker
- Andrew S. Warner (1819–1887), American politician from New York
- Annette Warner, German historian of ancient Egyptian mathematics
- Arthur Warner (1899–1966), English-born Australian businessman and politician
- Augustine Warner (1611–1674), Virginia colonial politician and farmer
- Augustine Warner Jr. (c. 1642 – 1681), Virginia colonial politician
- Bill Warner (American football) (1881–1944), American college football player and coach
- Bill Warner (motorcycle racer) (1969–2013), American motorcycle racer and land speed record holder
- Brian Warner (astronomer) (1939–2023), British astronomer
- Brian Hugh Warner (born 1969), musician, author, and director better known as Marilyn Manson
- Carolyn Warner (1930–2018), American politician
- Charles Warner (1846–1909), English actor
- Charles Dudley Warner (1829–1900), American essayist and novelist
- Corey Warner (born 2003), Australian rules footballer
- Curt Warner (born 1961), American football player
- Sir Courtenay Warner, 1st Baronet (1857–1934), British politician
- Darius B. Warner (1832–1917), American brigadier general
- David Warner (disambiguation) or Dave Warner, multiple people
- Deborah Warner (born 1959), British director of theatre and opera
- Earle S. Warner (1880–1971), New York politician and judge
- Ed Warner (1889–1954), American baseball player
- Ed Warner (basketball) (1929–2002), American basketball player
- Edward Warner (disambiguation), multiple people
- Emily Howell Warner (1939–2020), American aviator
- Ezra Warner (disambiguation), multiple people
- Frank Warner (disambiguation), multiple people
- Fred M. Warner (1865–1923), American politician from Michigan
- Frederick Warner (disambiguation), multiple people
- Fred Warner (American football) (born 1996), American football player
- Glenn Scobey Warner (Pop Warner) (1871–1954), American football coach
- Gordon Warner (1913–2010), American martial arts expert
- H. B. Warner (1875–1958), English actor
- Hans Warner (1844–1896), American politician
- Harry Warner (disambiguation), multiple people
- Hiram B. Warner (1802–1881), Georgia politician
- Horace B. Warner (1876–1915), American politician from New York
- Ivan Warner (1919–1994), American politician politician and judge from New York
- Jack Warner (disambiguation), multiple people
- Jackie Warner (disambiguation), multiple people
- John Warner (disambiguation), multiple people
- Kade Warner (born 1998), American football player
- Kathleen Warner née Kathleen Davis (1903–1996), Trinidadian actress and radio personality
- Ken Warner (1902–1988), British dance band musician
- Kenneth Warner (1891–1983), Bishop of Edinburgh
- Kirsten Warner (born 1956), New Zealand novelist, poet and journalist
- Kurt Warner (born 1971), American football player
- Larry Warner (1945–2022), American politician
- LeeAnna Warner (born 1998), American girl who disappeared in 2003
- Levinus Warner (1618–1665), orientalist
- Malcolm-Jamal Warner (1970–2025), American actor, producer and director
- Mark Warner (film editor) (born 1954), American film editor
- Mark Warner (born 1954), American politician from Virginia
- Marina Warner (born 1956), British novelist
- Martin Warner (born 1972), British businessman
- Martin Warner (bishop) (born 1958), English cleric
- Michael Warner (born 1958), American literary critic
- Nick Warner (born 1950), Australian diplomat and intelligence official
- Oliver Warner (1903–1976), British naval historian and writer
- Owen Warner (born 1999), English actor
- Pelham Warner (Sir Pelham Francis "Plum" Warner, 1873–1963), English cricketer
- Peter Warner (1931–2021), Australian seafarer and ship's captain
- Rex Warner (1905–1986), English classicist, writer and translator
- Ron Warner (baseball) (born 1968), American baseball coach
- Ross Warner (disambiguation), multiple people
- Sam Warner (1887–1927), one of the founders of Warner Bros. Studios
- Samuel Warner (disambiguation), multiple people
- Seth Warner (1743–1784), huntsman
- Susan Warner (1819–1885), American writer of religious fiction for young people
- Sylvia Townsend Warner (1893–1978), English novelist and poet
- Thomas Warner (disambiguation), multiple people
- Valentine Warner (born 1972), chef and presenter
- Volney F. Warner (1926–2019), U.S. Army general
- William Warner (disambiguation), multiple people
- Worcester Reed Warner (1846–1929), American mechanical engineer

== See also ==
- Warner (disambiguation)
- Warner (given name)
