= Werner (name) =

Werner is a name of German origin and is common both as a given name and a surname. As is often the case with Germanic names, it is a dithematic name, meaning it is composed of two semantically unrelated word stems, in this case the Old High German waron ('to protect/preserve/uphold') and heri ('army', cf modern German Heer). Wernher is a variation on Werner. Cognate names in other languages include Warner (English), Guernier (French), and Verner (Nordic languages).

The name was popular in the Habsburg family.

- Werner I (bishop of Strasbourg) (c. 980–1028)
- Werner I, Count of Klettgau (c. 1025–1096)
- Werner II, Count of Habsburg (d. 1167)

== People with the surname ==
Werner
- Pronunciation: English: /ˈwɜːrnər/ German: [ˈvɛʁnɐ] Swedish: [ˈvæ̌ːɳər]

Origin
- Region of origin: Germanic

Other names
- Variant forms: Verner, Wernher, Warner, Wessel

=== A–H ===
- Abraham Gottlob Werner (1749–1817), German geologist
- Alfred Werner (1866–1919), Swiss Nobel Prize–winning chemist
- Alice Werner (1859–1935), German/English writer and poet
- André Werner (born 1960), German composer
- Andréa Werner (born 1975), Brazilian journalist and politician
- Annette Werner (born 1966), German mathematician
- Anton von Werner (1843–1915), German painter
- Axel Werner (born 1996), Argentine professional footballer
- Björn Werner (born 1990), German player of American football
- Brian Werner (born 1966), American Tiger Conservationist, founder of Tiger Missing Link Foundation
- Bruno E. Werner (1896–1964), German diplomat, writer, philologist and publicist
- Buddy (Wallace Jerold) Werner (1936–1964), American alpine skier
- C. W. Otto Werner (1879–1936), German physician, discoverer of the premature aging condition, Werner syndrome
- Carla Werner, New Zealander/Australian singer-songwriter
- E. T. C. Werner (Edward Theodore Chalmers Werner), (1864–1954), British diplomat and sinologist
- Eberhard Werner (artist) (1924–2002), German artist and landscapist
- Emmy Werner (1929–2017), American psychologist
- Éric Werner (born 1940), Swiss philosopher
- Ferdinand Werner (1876–1961), German civil servant and politician
- Franz von Werner (1836–1881), Austrian and Ottoman diplomat and writer, known as Murad Effendi
- Franz Werner (1867–1939), Austrian herpetologist and entomologist
- Friedrich Ludwig Zacharias Werner (1768–1823), German poet, dramatist and preacher
- Fritz Werner (1898–1977), German conductor and composer
- Georg Werner (1904–2002), Swedish swimmer
- Gerhard Werner (1921–2012), Austrian/American neuroscientist
- Götz Werner (1944–2022), German entrepreneur
- Gregor Werner (1693–1766), Austrian composer
- Heinrich Werner (composer) (1800–1833), German composer
- Heinrich Werner (physician) (1874–1946), German physician
- Hildegard Werner (1834–1911), Swedish musician

=== I–Z ===
- Gladys "Skeeter" Werner Walker (1933–2001), American alpine skier
- Ilse Werner (1921–2005), Dutch/German singer/actress
- Jan Werner (athlete) (1946–2014), Polish sprinter
- Jens Werner (1964–2024), Danish ballroom dancer
- Johannes Werner (1466–1528), German priest and cartographer, inventor of the Werner map projection
- Josiah Werner (born 1980), American rock musician
- Jürgen Werner (disambiguation), multiple people
- Karel Werner (1925–2019), Czech philosopher
- Karl Werner (disambiguation), multiple people
- Katrin Werner (born 1973), German politician
- Lars Werner (1935–2013), Swedish politician
- Laure Werner (born 1981), Belgian cyclist
- Marco Werner (born 1966), German car racer, two times winner of 24 Hours of Le Mans
- Mariano Werner (born 1988), Argentine motor racing driver
- Markus Werner (1944–2016), Swiss writer
- Mike Werner (born 1971), German footballer
- Oskar Werner (1922–1984), Austrian theatre and movie actor
- Pe Werner (born 1960), German singer
- Pete Werner (born 1999), American football player
- Pierre Werner (1913–2002), Luxembourgian politician
- Reinhold von Werner (1825–1909), German naval officer
- Sabine Werner (born 1960), German biochemist
- Stephanie C. Werner, German-Norwegian geologist and planetologist
- Susan Elizabeth Werner Kieffer (born 1942), American physical geologist and planetary scientist
- Susan Werner (born 1965), American singer/songwriter
- Theodore B. Werner (1892–1989), American politician
- Timo Werner (born 1996), German footballer
- Tom Preston-Werner (born 1979), American entrepreneur (GitHub)
- Tom Werner (born 1950), American television producer of Carsey-Werner Productions and owner of the Boston Red Sox
- Tommy Werner (born 1966), Swedish swimmer
- Wendelin Werner (born 1968), French mathematician, winner of the Fields medal in 2006
- Wilhelm Werner (1888–1945), German naval and SS officer
- William E. Werner (1855–1916), American judge from New York
- Yehudah Leopold Werner (born 1931), Israeli zoologist
- Zack Werner (born 1960), Canadian artist and producer; judge on Canadian Idol

== People with the given name ==
Werner
- Pronunciation: Werner, pronounced [ˈvɛʁnɐ]
- Gender: Male

Origin
- Region of origin: Germanic

Other names
- Related names: Verner, Wernher, Warner

=== Given name only ===
- Werner, Margrave of the Nordmark (died 1014), Margrave of the Nordmark 1003–1009

=== A–J ===
- Rainer Werner Fassbinder (1945–1982), German movie director, screenwriter and actor
- Werner Abrolat (1924–1997), German actor and voice actor
- Werner Aisslinger (born 1964), German furniture designer
- Werner Asam (1944–2026), German television actor, director and writer
- Werner Aspenström (1918–1997), Swedish poet
- Werner Best (1903–1989), high-ranking Nazi official during World War II
- Werner Bochmann (1900–1993), German composer
- Werner Braune (1909–1951), German Nazi SS officer, executed for war crimes
- Werner Bruschke (1898–1995), East German politician
- Werner Cabrera, Peruvian politician
- Werner Christie (born 1949), Norwegian Labour Party politician, former Minister of Social Affairs and Health and Social Affairs
- Werner D. Horn, American politician
- Werner Dankwort (1895–1986), German diplomat before and after the Nazi era
- Werner Erhard (born 1935), American founder of Erhard Seminars Training (EST) and The Landmark Forum
- Werner Faymann (born 1960), Austrian politician
- Werner Fenchel (1905–1988), German mathematician
- Werner Finck (1902–1978), German comedian
- Werner Forssmann, (1904–1979), German physician, received the Nobel Prize for cardiological studies
- Werner Franz (born 1972), Austrian alpine skier
- Werner Funck (1881–1951), German stage and film actor, singer, and film director
- Werner Günthör (born 1961), Swiss Olympic track and field athlete
- Werner Hamacher (1948–2017), German deconstructive literary critic and theorist
- Werner Heisenberg (1901–1976), German quantum physicist and Nobel laureate
- Werner Herzog (born 1942), German film and opera actor, director, and screenwriter
- Werner Heuser (1880–1964), German painter
- Werner Hippler (born 1970), plays American football in Germany for the Cologne Centurions, formerly played for Frankfurt Galaxy
- Werner Hoeger (born 1954), Venezuelan Olympic athlete
- Werner Hug (born 1952), Swiss chess player
- Werner Hüllen (1927–2008), German lexicographer
- Werner Iita (born 1963), Namibian politician
- Werner Jäger (born 1959), Austrian speed skater
- Werner Wolfgang Heubeck (1923–2009), German-British transport executive, former managing director of Ulsterbus and Citybus in Northern Ireland.
- Werner Z. Hirsch (1920–2009), German-born American economist

=== K–Z ===
- Hans Werner Olm (born Hans Olm, 1955), German television and film comedian
- Werner Kiem (born 1962), Italian biathlete
- Werner Klemperer (1920–2000), German actor
- Werner Koch (born 1961), German free-software author
- Werner Kohlmeyer (1924–1974), West German football (soccer) player
- Werner Krämer (1940–2010), West German football (soccer) player
- Werner Krauss (1884–1959), German film actor
- Werner Kutzelnigg (1933–2019), prominent Austrian-German theoretical chemist
- Werner Lička (born 1954), Czech football (soccer) player and manager
- Werner Liebrich (1927–1995), German football (soccer) player and coach
- Werner Mamugwe (1936–1998), Namibian politician
- Werner Marti (ski mountaineer) (born 1989), Swiss ski mountaineer
- Werner Mölders, Nazi German Luftwaffe fighter ace in World War II
- Werner Munter (1941–2007), Swiss mountaineering expert
- Werner of Oberwesel (1271–1287), Christian boy allegedly murdered by Jews but venerated as a saint and martyr
- Werner Otto (cyclist) (born 1948), East German track cyclist
- Werner Perathoner (born 1967), Italian alpine skier
- Werner Peter (born 1950), East German football (soccer) player
- Werner Ploberger (born 1956), Austrian econometrician
- Werner Potzernheim (1927–2014), German road bicycle and track cyclist
- Werner Rahn (1939–2022), German naval officer and naval historian
- Werner Reiterer (born 1968), Australian discus thrower
- Werner Rolevinck (1425–1502), Carthusian monk
- Werner Roth (comics) (1921–1973), American comic book artist
- Werner Roth (footballer, born 1925) (1925–2011), coach of Karlsruher SC in the 1960s
- Werner Roth (footballer, born 1948), American soccer player
- Werner S. Weiglhofer (1962–2003), Austrian mathematician and engineer
- Werner Schildhauer (born 1959), East German track and field athlete
- Werner Schmidt (1932–2024), Canadian politician
- Werner Schmidt-Boelcke (1903–1985), German composer
- Werner Schmieder (born 1926), German politician
- Werner Schnitzer (born 1942), German television actor
- Werner Schroeter (1945–2010), German film director
- Werner Sobek (born 1953), German architect and research engineer
- Werner Stengel (born 1936), German engineer and roller-coaster designer
- Werner Stocker (actor) (1955–1993), German film and television actor
- Werner Vogels (born 1958), Dutch-American Amazon CTO
- Werner von Blomberg (1878–1946) German General Staff officer and first Minister of War
- Werner von Fritsch (1880–1939), member of the German High Command and commander-in-chief of the German Army
- Werner von Siemens (1816–1892), German inventor and industrialist
- Werner von Urslingen (1308–1354), German mercenary
- Werner Voss (1897–1917), German World War I fighter ace
- Werner Weinhold (1949–2024), Former NVA soldier and defector to West Germany
- Werner Zorn (born 1942), German computer scientist

== Fictional characters ==
Werner Ziegler, a character from Better Call Saul

== See also ==
- Werner (disambiguation)
- Warner (given name)
- Warner (surname)
