= Garnier (surname) =

Garnier is a surname commonly found in France and Quebec, originally from the first name Garnier of Germanic etymology Warin-hari, like Werner. Garnier de Nablus was a master of the Knights Hospitalier, commander under Richard I in the Third Crusade. Local and dialectal French variations include Gasnier, Grenier, Guernier, Varnier, Vernier, Warnier, Warniez, Wargniez, Wargnier and Warnéry. Garnier is a common name in France, although not as much in Quebec. The name can also be found in the Netherlands. The name came to Maastricht through Wallonia in the 17th century and spread across the country from there.

== List of persons with the surname ==
- Anouk Garnier (born 1989/1990), French athlete, obstacle course runner and rope climber
- Charles Garnier (architect), 19th-century French architect
- Charles Garnier (missionary), Jesuit missionary martyred in Canada in 1649
- Claude Garnier (1535–1589), Renaissance-era printer of popular literature
- Edward Garnier, British politician
- Francis Garnier, French explorer
- Geoffrey Sneyd Garnier, English artist and printmaker
- Jacques Garnier (1755–1817/18), French revolutionary
- Jean Garnier (1612–1681), French patristic scholar
- Joseph Garnier (1813–1881), French economist and politician
- Joseph-François Garnier, French oboist and composer
- Laurent Garnier, French musician and DJ
- Mark Garnier, British politician
- Nelly Garnier (born 1985), French politician
- Octave Garnier, French anarchist
- Pablo Garnier, Argentine footballer
- Pierre Dominique Garnier (1756–1827), French general
- Robert Garnier, French poet
- Séan Garnier, French freestyle footballer
- Thierry Garnier, French businessman
- Tony Garnier (architect), French architect
- Tony Garnier (musician), American bassist
- Yamil Garnier, Argentine footballer
- Erawan Garnier, Thai footballer

== See also ==
- Garnier (disambiguation)
