= Warner (given name) =

Warner (English: /ˈwɔːrnər/; German: [ˈvaʁnɐ]) is an English, Finnish, Norwegian and Swedish given name that is an alternate form of Werner that is in use throughout North America, Australia, New Zealand, Papua New Guinea, the Philippines, Peninsular Malaysia, India, Pakistan, the British Isles, Norway, Finland, Sweden, the Republic of Karelia, Estonia, Guyana, Liberia, Sierra Leone, Ghana, Namibia, South Africa, Botswana, Zimbabwe, Zambia, Malawi, Tanzania, Uganda, Kenya, Sudan, South Sudan, Ethiopia, Cameroon and Nigeria. Warner is derived from Germanic origins, and can be defined or translated to: defender or, defending warrior. It can be also be observed from the old German name, Warnier. The prefix or root, Warn or, Wer- comes from Indo-European etymology. Over time, Warner has evolved from the name Werner which is much less common. Overall, this name came from German roots and was adapted over time through many other cultures. Warin, is an old German word and means protecter or guard. This also relates to a cognate in English, "warn or, (to) warn." which is usually protective. A French surname, Warnier which can be adopted from German, can be found from old Norse names. These include, Verner or Wærn. Some other spelling variations of this name involve, Warner, Warnar, Warnere. It also came from Ireland and evolved through to the U.S through Irish immigrants. Warner first was found in the Domesday book (1086) the prefix,"Warn" was found in Warnerus and Warnerius. These were thought to be ancient baptismal names. It was first also founded in the Anglo-Saxon which is from German and England culture. Notable people with this name include the following:

== First name ==
- Warner (fl. 1106) English writer of homilies
- Warner Anderson (1911–1976), American actor
- Warner Batchelor (1934–2016), Australian boxer
- Warner Baxter (1889–1951), American film actor
- Warner B. Bayley (1845–1928), American military
- Warner Cope (1824–1903), American judge
- Warner Earll (1814–1888), justice of the Supreme Court of Nevada
- Warner Fite (1867–1955), American philosopher
- Warner Fusselle (1944–2012), American sportscaster
- Warner of Grez (died 1100), French nobleman
- Warner Norton Grubb (1900–1947), American naval officer
- Warner Norton Grubb III (1948–2015), American economist
- Warner Hassells (fl. 1680-1710), German painter
- Warner Hastings, 15th Earl of Huntingdon (1868–1939), British nobleman
- Warner Jepson (1930–2011), American composer
- Warner Jorgenson (1918–2005), Canadian politician
- Warner T. Koiter (1914–1997), Dutch mechanical engineer
- Warner E. Leighton (1930–2005), American film editor
- Warner LeRoy (1935–2001), American businessman
- Warner Mack (1935-2022) American singer-songwriter
- Warner Madrigal (born 1984), Dominican baseball player
- Warner McCollum (1933–2009), American gridiron football coach
- Warner Mifflin (1745–1798), American abolitionist
- Warner Miller (1838–1918), American politician
- Warner Mizell 1907–1971), American gridiron football player
- Warner Oland (1879–1938), Swedish actor
- Warner Richmond (1886–1948), American actor
- Warner S. Rodimon (1907–2005), American naval officer
- Warner Sallman (1892–1968), American painter
- Warner R. Schilling (1925–2013), American political scientist
- Warner B. Snider (1880–1965), American politician
- Warner Troyer (1932–1991), Canadian broadcast journalist and writer
- Warner Underwood (1808–1872), American politician
- Warner Westenra, 2nd Baron Rossmore (1765–1842), Irish politician
- Warner Wing (1805–1876), American jurist and legislator
- Warner Wolf (born 1937), American broadcaster
- Warner P. Woodworth, American academic

== Middle name ==
- Augustine Warner Robins (1882–1940), American Air Force general
- Caroline Warner Hightower (born 1935), American executive
- David Warner Hagen (1931–2022), American Judge
- George Warner Allen (1916–1988), British artist
- Gerald Warner Brace (1901–1978), American writer, educator, sailor and boat builder
- H. Warner Munn (1903–1981), American writer
- Henry Warner Birge (1825–1888), American general
- Hiram Warner Farnsworth (1816–1899), American abolitionist
- J. Warner Wallace (born 1961), American detective
- James Warner Bellah (1899–1976), American author
- John Warner Barber (1798–1885), American engraver and historian
- John Warner Fitzgerald (1924–2006), American politician and judge
- John Warner Smith (born 1952), American poet and educator
- Joseph Warner Murphy (1892–1977), Canadian politician
- Julia Warner Snow (1863–1927), American botanist
- K. Warner Schaie (1928–2023), American gerontologist and psychologist
- Margaret Warner Morley (1858–1923), American biologist, and author
- William Warner Bishop (1871–1955), American librarian

== See also ==
- Warner (disambiguation)
- Warner (surname)
- Wagner (given name)
- Werner (name)
