= John Warner (disambiguation) =

John Warner (1927–2021) was an American politician, Secretary of the Navy from 1972 to 1974, Republican senator from Virginia from 1979 to 2009.

John Warner may also refer to:

== Clergymen ==
- John Warner (physician) (died 1565), British academic and cleric, Regius Professor of Medicine
- John Warner (bishop) (1581–1666), bishop of Rochester
- John Warner (Jesuit) (1628–1692), English Jesuit, known as a controversialist and confessor to James II
- John Warner (scholar) (1736–1800), English cleric and classical scholar

== Public officials ==
- John Warner (MP), English Member of Parliament (MP) for Bishop's Lynn in October 1416
- John Warner (Lord Mayor) (before 1600–1648), English merchant, Lord Mayor of London in 1647
- John Warner (settler) (c.1615–1654), Warwick, Rhode Island's first town clerk (1647) and clerk of the Colony’s General Assembly (1648)
- J. De Witt Warner (1851–1925), American congressman from New York, 1891–1895
- John Warner (Australian politician) (1923–1991), member of Queensland Legislative Assembly
- John Warner (judge) (born 1943), American justice of Montana Supreme Court since 2003
- John Warner (North Dakota politician) (born 1952), Democratic-NPL state legislator

== Sportsmen ==
- Jack Warner (footballer, born 1883) (1883–1948), English full-back with Portsmouth
- John Warner (umpire) (1911–1995), South African cricket umpire
- John Warner (footballer, born 1961), English forward and manager with Colchester
- John Warner (racing driver), in 2001 12 Hours of Sebring

== Writers ==
- John Warner Barber (1798–1885), American engraver and historian
- J. Foster Warner (1859–1937), American architect and author in Rochester, New York
- John Warner (college president) (1897–1989), American chemist and science writer
- John Warner (comics) (born 1952), American comic book writer and editor
- John Warner (chemist) (born 1962), American chemist, co-founder of Warner Babcock Institute for Green Chemistry
- John Warner (writer) (born 1970), American humorist, editor of McSweeney's Internet Tendency

== Others ==
- Juan José Warner (1807–1890), American-Mexican rancher in California
- John Warner (RAF officer) (1899–1918), British World War I flying ace
- John Warner (actor) (1924–2001), British film, TV and stage performer

== See also ==
- John Warner & Sons, British metalworks, founded 1739
- The John Warner School, founded 1953 in Hoddesdon, England
- USS John Warner, American Navy Virginia-class submarine, launched in 2014
- Jack Warner (disambiguation)
- Jackie Warner (disambiguation)
- Warner (disambiguation)
