= William Warner =

William or Bill Warner may refer to:

- William Warner (poet) (c. 1558–1609), English poet
- William H. Warner (1812–1849), officer in the U.S. Army's Corps of Topographical Engineers
- William Smith Warner (1817–1897), American politician
- William Warner (Missouri politician) (1840–1916), American politician
- William Warner (cricketer) (1844–1871), English cricketer
- William John Warner or Cheiro (1866–1936), Irish astrologer and palmist
- William Warner (Conservative politician) (1867–1950), British Army officer and politician
- Bill Warner (American football) (1881–1944), American football player and coach
- W. Lloyd Warner (1898–1970), American anthropologist
- William W. Warner (1920–2008), American author, winner of a Pulitzer Prize in 1977
- Bill Warner (motorcyclist) (1969–2013), American motorcycle racer
- William Warner (Michigan politician, born 1806) (1806–?), American politician
- William Warner (Michigan politician, born 1812) (1812–1868), American politician

== See also ==
- Bill Warner (disambiguation)
- Warner (surname)
