= Derbyshire (surname) =

Derbyshire is a surname derived from the county of Derbyshire, England. Notable people with the surname include:

== Architecture ==
- Andrew Derbyshire (1923–2016), British architect, designed the University of York
- Ben Derbyshire, British architect, RIBA president 2017–2019
- Nick Derbyshire (architect) (1944–2016), chief architect for British Rail

== Arts, entertainment and media ==
- Charles Derbyshire (1880–1933), American translator of the works of Jose Rizal
- Delia Derbyshire (1937–2001), British musician and composer
- Eileen Derbyshire (born 1930), British character actress
- JD Derbyshire (died 2025), Canadian writer and comedian
- John Derbyshire (born 1945), British-born American author and conservative essayist
- Katy Derbyshire, British translator of German literature
- Victoria Derbyshire (born 1968), British journalist and radio broadcaster

== Sport ==
- Adrian Derbyshire (born 1974) former British wheelchair fencer
- Billy Derbyshire (died 1974), English rugby league player
- Craig Derbyshire (born 1991), English professional boxer
- James Derbyshire (1882–1945), English footballer, played for Blackburn Rovers etc.
- Joe Derbyshire (1883–1946), English footballer, played for Blackburn Rovers etc.
- John Derbyshire (swimmer) (1878–1938), English Olympian freestyle swimmer and water polo player
- Matt Derbyshire (born 1986), English footballer for Nottingham Forest and England U-21
- Nick Derbyshire (cricketer) (born 1970), English cricketer
- Paul Derbyshire (born 1986), Italian rugby union player
- Seamus Derbyshire (born 2000), British hurdler

== Other ==
- Harold Derbyshire (1886–1972), British judge
