= South East Derbyshire =

South East Derbyshire may refer to:

- South East Derbyshire (UK Parliament constituency)
- South East Derbyshire Rural District, a rural district in Derbyshire, England from 1894 to 1974

== See also ==
- Derbyshire (disambiguation)
