= Derbyshire (disambiguation) =

Derbyshire is a county in the East Midlands, England.

Derbyshire may also refer to:

- Derbyshire (surname)
- Derbyshire (UK Parliament constituency), a defunct political division based on the county
- MV Derbyshire (built 1976), British merchant ship, sunk in 1980 during Typhoon Orchid
- SS Derbyshire, launched in 1897
- Derbyshire County Cricket Club, an English first-class cricket club
- Derbyshire (European Parliament constituency)
- "Derbyshire" (Walking Britain's Lost Railways), a TV documentary episode
