= John Glen King =

Church of England clergyman

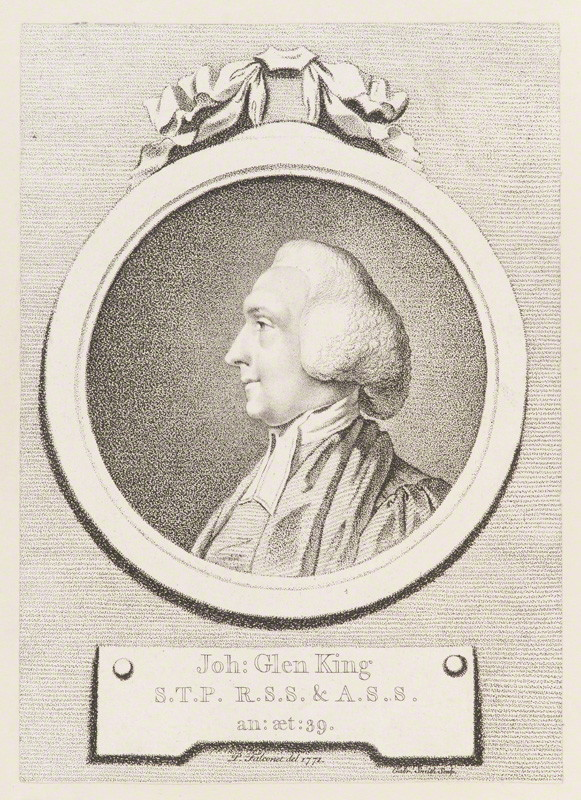
John Glen King, 1771 engraving

John Glen King D.D. (1732–1787) was an English cleric and antiquarian, known as an author on the Russian Orthodox Church.

== Life ==
Born in Stowmarket. Suffolk, he was the son of George King, rector of Southacre in Norfolk. He was educated at Swaffham School, and Caius College, Cambridge, where he graduated B.A. in 1752 and M.A. in 1763. After taking orders he was presented by the king in 1760 to the vicarage of Barwick Parva, Norfolk; and subsequently was appointed chaplain to the English factory at St Petersburg. During his residence in Russia he was appointed medallist to Catherine the Great; and studied the history and liturgical rites of Orthodox church.

King became a Fellow of the Society of Antiquaries of London on 10 January 1771, and then on 21 February that year was elected a Fellow of the Royal Society. He was incorporated M.A. at Oxford, on 19 March 1771, as a member of Christ Church, Oxford, and four days later took Oxford degrees of B.D. and D.D. He was presented to the rectory of Wormley, Hertfordshire, by Sir Abraham Hume, 2nd Baronet, in July 1783. In 1786 he purchased the chapel in Spring Gardens, London, and John Warner's chapel in Drury Lane, London.

King died at his house in Edward Street, London, after a few hours' illness, on 3 November 1787, and was buried in the churchyard of Wormley.

== Works ==
King's major scholarly work was The Rites and Ceremonies of the Greek Church in Russia; containing an Account of its Doctrine, Worship, and Discipline, London, 1772, dedicated to the king, ad illustrated with copper-plate engravings. An earlier version had appeared in 1767, as an appendix to a work by George Macartney. While it made him a scholarly reputation, he struggled for church preferment, patronage and social acceptance.

King was also the author of:

- Verses in the Cambridge University collection on the death of Frederick, Prince of Wales, 1752.
- A Letter to the Bishop of Durham, containing some Observations on the Climate of Russia, and the Northern Countries, with a View of the Flying Mountains at Zarsko Sello, near St. Petersburg, 1778. Printed in the Westminster Magazine, 1780.
- Observations on the Barberini Vase, 1786; in Archæologia, viii. 307.
- Catalogue of a small Library at St. Petersburg,’ London, 1786.
- Nummi Familiarum et Imperatorum Romanorum [London? 1787?], 102 plates, no letterpress.

== Family ==
He married, first, Ann Magdalene, daughter of Michael Combrune, by whom he had one daughter, Anna Henrietta; and secondly, in August 1776, at Greenwich, Jane, daughter of John Hyde, esq., of Blackheath (she died in August 1789).

== Notes ==
Attribution

This article incorporates text from a publication now in the public domain: Lee, Sidney, ed. (1892). "King, John Glen". Dictionary of National Biography. Vol. 31. London: Smith, Elder & Co.
