= George Elliott Howard =

American historian

George Elliott Howard (October 1, 1849 – June 9, 1928) was an American educator and author. He was a professor at the University of Nebraska from 1889 to 1891, and a professor at Stanford from 1891 to 1901. He was also the president of the American Sociological Society in 1917.

== Early life ==
George Elliott Howard was born on October 1, 1849, in Saratoga, New York, to Howard and Margaret Hardin. He moved to Nebraska with his family in 1868.

== Career ==
After receiving an A.B. degree from the Peru State College, Howard traveled to Munich and Paris for to study Roman law and history from 1876 to January 1878. He joined the University of Nebraska faculty in 1879. One of his most prominent students was Amos Griswold Warner. Howard was named to the "first faculty" of the Stanford University in 1901.

Controversy erupted after professor Edward Alsworth Ross was fired by Stanford president David Starr Jordan because of his political views on eugenics. Howard defended Ross, citing the first amendment to the United States Constitution. Jordan demanded an apology from Howard, but Howard resigned instead, along with several other professors. He did several lectures at the University of Chicago from 1903 to 1904. Howard returned to the University of Nebraska in 1904, and his colleagues included Edward Alsworth Ross and Roscoe Pound. In 1906, Howard was named head of the Department of Political Science and Sociology. Howard retired in 1924.

== Death ==
Howard died in 1928, in Lincoln, Nebraska.

== Publications ==
- Local Constitutional History of the United States (1889)
- The Evolution of the University (1890)
- The King's Peace and the Local Peace Magistracy (1891)
- History of Matrimonial Institutions (three volumes, 1904)
- Preliminaries of the Revolution (1905)
- Social Control and Function of the Family (1906)
- General Sociology (1907)
- The Family and Marriage (1914)
