= David Booth (lexicographer) =

Scottish author (1766–1846)

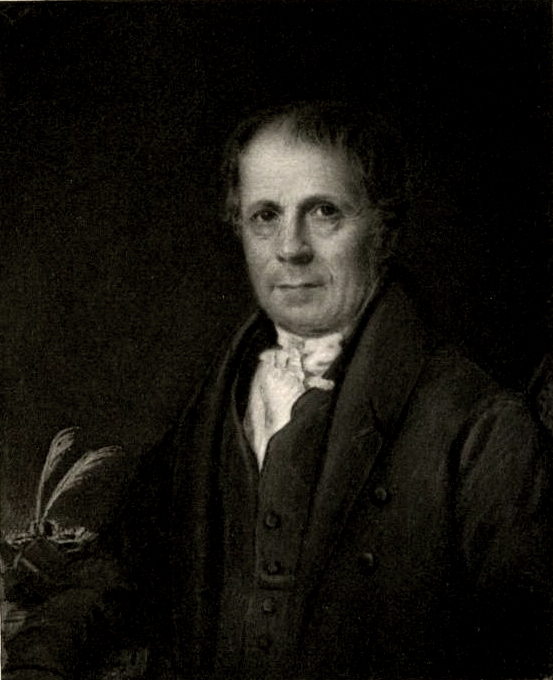
David Booth

David Booth (1766–1846) was a Scottish author, known for his unfinished Analytical Dictionary of the English Language.

== Early life ==
Booth was born at Kinnettles, Forfarshire, on 9 February 1766. He was almost entirely self-taught, having only a few months at the parish school, an autodidact "of prodigious learning and imposing demeanour".

In his early years Booth was in business, and for a time ran a brewery at Woodside, near Newburgh, Fife. He moved on to become the schoolmaster at Newburgh. He was a friend of the nurseryman George Don (1764–1814), father of David Don, and in 1812 supplied him with seeds for the botanic garden at Forfar.

== In London ==
Around 1817 Booth was planning to move to the London area, and by 1818 the family had settled there. In 1820 he was in touch with Jeremy Bentham. Besides working as a writer, Booth for some years superintended for the press the publications of the Society for the Diffusion of Useful Knowledge (SDUK). In 1827 he was running a brewery in King Street, in the City of London.

Booth suffered much financial hardship. He applied successfully to the Royal Literary Fund for support in 1840. He later received through Sir Robert Peel a grant of £50 from the Royal Bounty Fund.

== Later life ==
In the 1840s Booth and his third wife Isabella were living near Milton of Balgonie, with her brother Robert Baxter (1796–1862). He died at Balgonie Mills, on 5 December 1845.

== Works ==
=== Dictionary and the English language ===
In 1806 Booth published Introduction to an Analytical Dictionary of the English Language. Its special characteristic Booth stated to be that

the words are explained in the order of their affinity, independent of alphabetical arrangement; and the signification of each is traced from its etymology, the present meaning accounted for when it differs from its former acceptation, the whole exhibiting in one connected narrative the origin, history, and modern usages of the existing vocabulary of the English tongue.

The emphasis was on morphology, affixes, parts of speech and etymology. A downbeat assessment at that time from Joseph Johnson, publisher of the Analytical Review, gave his view of the market for such a linguistic work:

...those who have made language their study, a few writers & public & gentlemen's libraries, a few of the latter only.

Booth's Analytical Dictionary began to be issued as a part publication from 1822. A single completed volume appeared in 1835; the second volume that had been announced in 1830 was not published.

Werner Hüllen wrote

...the author moves from the lexemes to their extensions and the associative chain of the meanings themselves. Also obvious is the historical and comparative attitude with reference to Indo-European languages.

Other works in this area were:

- Principles of English Composition (1831), with some material from the Introduction to an Analytical Dictionary.
- Principles of English Grammar (1837)

William Hazlitt's Grammar was influenced both by Booth's work and by that of the linguist Nicholas Salmon.

=== Mathematical ===
- The Tradesman, Merchant, and Accountant's Assistant, being tables for Business in general on a new Plan of Arrangement (1818)
- The Retail Trader's and Housekeeper's Ready Reckoner (1819)
- A Letter to the Rev. T. R. Malthus ... Being an answer to the criticism on Mr. Godwin's work on population ... in the Edinburgh Review (1823)

The address at which Bentham wrote to Booth, "London Field, Hackney", is the same as that given for the schoolmaster David Booth who was a member of the Spitalfields Mathematical Society.

Booth became involved, on the statistical side, in William Godwin's reply to the fifth edition (1817, the first edition after the end of the wars with France) of An Essay on the Principle of Population by Thomas Malthus. Of Population (1820) by Godwin included a "Mathematical Dissertation" by Booth. Godwin's major argument against Malthus alleged fallacious reasoning in the use of geometric progressions to model population growth that neglected the effect of child mortality. The "Dissertation" innovated by using age distribution to disaggregate population figures, and left claims by Malthus looking "arbitrary". The method was taken up in 1821 by the pseudonymous Piercy Ravenstone. Kenneth Smith comments that Booth's method was a "big contribution" to the statistical question, that the method of Malthus "could prove nothing", and that Booth's view that the problem (as posed) "is really insoluble" is probably correct.

Malthus had namechecked Godwin and his 1797 essay collection The Enquirer in his first edition (1798) of his Essay. Malthus replied very briefly to On Population in his sixth edition of 1826, to have the last word in the long controversy. Booth's Letter pamphlet against Malthus of 1823, as a proxy for Godwin though he denied in the introduction being a "champion", began by alleging that Malthus was the author of the anonymous review of On Population in the Edinburgh Review. It addressed the population growth debate as a statistical matter on the basis of census evidence, and made some detailed analysis of the statistical work of John Rickman.

=== Beer and wine ===
- The Art of Brewing (1829), for the SDUK. Remarks by Booth on the Brewers of Burton led to a legal claim.
- Description and Use of the Brewer's Saccharometer: Being a Correction of Mr. Richardson's Original Instrument (1829), by The Author of the Treatises on Brewing, sold with Booth's saccharometer. Booth claimed improvement on the methods of the 18th-century brewer John Richardson, publicised in a book from 1784.
- The Art of Wine-making in all its Branches, to which is added an Appendix concerning Cider and Perry (1834), for the SDUK; it includes a description of Booth's saccharometer.

=== Other works ===
- Eura and Zephyra, a classical tale; with poetical pieces (1816, 2nd edition, expanded, 1832). Eura and Zephyra was republished in 1978 with poems by Elizabeth Hitchener of the Godwin–Shelley circle.
- Observations on the English Jury Laws in Criminal Cases, with respect to the distinction between unanimous verdicts, and verdicts by a majority (1833)

Booth had a paper on tanning read to the Hackney Literary and Philosophical Society in 1811.

== Associations and reputation ==
Booth was a close associate of the Dundee textile industrialist and merchant William Thomas Baxter (1771/2–1842), six or seven years younger than him. Baxter resided at Broughty Ferry, east of Dundee along the north side of the Firth of Tay, on which Newburgh lay at the west end. He was a descendant of the early Glasite follower John Baxter of Tealing, a weaver who moved to Dundee. Later generations founded the Baxter Brothers textile company. Baxter and Booth both kept to their revolutionary "Jacobin" views of the 1790s.

Baxter had contributed to William Godwin's fundraising at the time of the 1794 Treason Trials. Booth was a correspondent of Godwin's from 1799. A family link to the Godwins was made when Baxter's son Robert and Godwin's stepson Charles Clairmont were on good terms, in Edinburgh.

=== Godwin and Baxter families (1812–1814) ===
Mary Godwin spent a period with the Baxter family outside Dundee, and in November 1812 returned to London with Christy (Christian or Christina) Baxter, one of the daughters of the house, with whom she debated feminism at this period. This was for a six month break in her time in Dundee.

Mary Godwin was in Dundee again, when she was taken by Christy's sister Isabel (Isabella) to visit Booth at Newburgh. She returned to London in March 1814. Booth travelled to London that year, and it is speculated by Murray that he then asked [William Godwin for permission to marry Mary. Miranda Seymour, from Godwin's diary, concluded tentatively that the proposal was Booth's "express purpose" for the London journey. Booth was staying with Godwin in London at Skinner Street when he received letters from Scotland dated January about the death of George Don.

Booth then married Isabel Baxter, and Mary Godwin eloped with Percy Bysshe Shelley, whom she married in 1816, at the end of July 1814. Booth wrote to Mary later in 1814, to break off all contact between her and Isabel. Mary wrote in her diary for 3 November "Receive a letter from Mr. Booth; so all my hopes are over there. Ah! Isabel; I did not think you would act thus."

Later, Mary Shelley resumed her friendship with Isabel Booth in the 1820s. She backed Booth's application towards the end of his life to the Royal Literary Fund for support.

=== 1817–1818 in London ===
Godwin, after the death of Percy Shelley's first wife Harriet and his marriage to Mary Godwin at the end of 1816, encouraged Baxter towards a reconciliation. Baxter, more open than Booth to addressing the family rift, visited the Shelleys at Marlow, Buckinghamshire. At this point, Baxter was concerned that his daughter Isabel was not happy with the intransigent Booth, whom he described in a letter as "ill-tempered and jealous". A proposal had been made that Isabel accompany the Shelleys to Italy.

Subsequently, Booth and Baxter saw Shelley on two evenings of November 1817 in London, documented in letters of all three, with Mary, Godwin, and Claire Clairmont. The initial evening had Shelley read from Laon and Cythna (the precursor form of The Revolt of Islam). Shelley debated the institution of marriage with Booth; he admitted in December to Baxter that he came off worse. Booth had his views on Shelley reinforced: he wrote to Isabel that Shelley, as Claire's lover, was a hypocrite in marrying Mary, and stated (incorrectly) that Allegra Byron (Alba) was Shelley's daughter. He also restated his view that Shelley was mentally ill, something already mooted by Baxter and Isabel. He argued strongly that Baxter should make a break with the Shelleys, as he did. As a possible consequence of perceived conflict after the encounters, Shelley for a time ceased to work on Rosalind and Helen. The biography by Edward Dowden of Shelley established the view that Booth appears in that poem as one of the four main characters, with Shelley, Mary and Isabel. While there is no evidence that Shelley knew Booth's prose Eura and Zephyra of 1816, the contrast with Rosalind and Helen has been found "intriguing and suggestive".

By 1818, the Booth family had moved to Homerton, in Hackney, then a village east of London. There they lived initially with the Baxter family. Booth's later London address was 25 Charlotte Street in Bloomsbury.

Henry Crabb Robinson met Booth twice at dinner with William Godwin, in 1818, and compared him in his diary to John Philpot Curran: His conversation was "singular, even original", and his appearance "very like the Grub Street poet of the last century". The "rawboned Scotchman" present on the first occasion is identified as Baxter.

=== Later years ===
In 1820, Booth was working with Godwin, on their reply to Malthus. At this time, Robert Baxter, elder son of William Thomas Baxter, was stirring up trouble between the two, the bone of contention being Godwin's efforts to borrow money from Booth, seen as sponging.

Booth was characterised in the Memoirs of Robert Blakey, based on a meeting in 1832:

One of the most extraordinary personages I have met for some time. He is not, I believe, five feet high, of very dark visage, eyes very red and watery, and presenting altogether an impish and fiendish look. He was, however, very kind.

== Family ==
Booth was three times married:

1. To Katharine Potter in 1797. She died before 1809.
2. In 1809, to Margaret Baxter (1789–c.1813), daughter of William Thomas Baxter of Dundee (see above)..
3. To Isabella Baxter, his sister-in-law, in 1814. The union was not compatible with the prohibited degree of kinship provisions in Scots Law, and caused Booth and family members to be expelled from the Glasite church.

He was survived by a son and two daughters. His daughter Catharine (sometimes Catherine) married Joseph Gordon Stuart and was mother of James Stuart.
