= Garnier (disambiguation) =

Garnier is a division of the L'Oréal Group which sells hair care products.

Garnier may also refer to:

== Companies ==
- Garnier Liqueur de Paris et Enghien, a 19th and 20th century French liqueur manufacturer famous for its four-chamber bottles and vast menagerie of decorative, collectible figurine decanters.

== People ==
- Garnier de Nablus, Master of the Knights Hospitalier, commander under Richard I in the Third Crusade
- Garnier (writer), also known as Warner (fl. 1106), English writer of homilies, and a monk of Westminster
- Garnier (surname)
- Garnier family, a family of Huguenot origin

== Places ==
- Palais Garnier, or Paris Opéra, an opera house in Paris, France
