= Warner =

Warner may refer to:

== People ==
- Warner (writer)
- Warner (given name)
- Warner (surname)

=== Fictional characters ===
- Yakko, Wakko, and Dot Warner, stars of the animated television series Animaniacs
- Aaron Warner, a character in Shatter Me series

== Education ==
- Warner Pacific University, Portland, Oregon
- Warner University, Lake Wales, Florida

== Places ==
- Warner (crater), a lunar impact crater in the southern part of the Mare Smythii
- Warner Theatre (disambiguation), several theatres

=== Australia ===
- Warner, Queensland

=== Canada ===
- County of Warner No. 5, a municipal district in Alberta
- Warner, Alberta, a village
- Warner elevator row, Warner, Alberta

=== United States ===
- Warner, New Hampshire, a New England town
  - Warner (CDP), New Hampshire, the main village in the town
- Warner, Ohio, an unincorporated community
- Warner, Oklahoma
- Warner, South Dakota
- Warner, Wisconsin, a town

== Organisations ==
- Warner Aerocraft, an American aircraft manufacturer based in Seminole, Florida
- Warner Aircraft Corporation, an American manufacturer of radial aircraft engines in 1928 and early 1930s
- Warner Books (now Grand Central Publishing), a division of Hachette Book Group USA
- Warner Bros., a brand name used by multiple companies
  - Warner Bros. Discovery, a multinational mass media and entertainment conglomerate based in New York City
- Warner Music Group, record label group founded as Warner Bros. Records
- Warner Leisure Hotels, UK hotel chain
- Warner–Lambert, now merged with Pfizer, a pharmaceutical company

== Record labels ==
- Warner Alliance
- Warner Records
- Warner Curb Records
- Warner Music Australasia
- Warner Music Canada
- Warner-Spector Records

== See also ==
- Irnerius (sometimes referred to as Warnerius), an Italian jurist from the 11th century
- Warners (disambiguation)
- Justice Warner (disambiguation)
- Senator Warner (disambiguation)
