= Jack Warner =

Jack Warner may refer to:

== Film and TV ==
- Jack L. Warner (1892–1978), head of Warner Bros. studio
- Jack M. Warner (1916–1995), American film producer
- Jack Warner (actor) (1895–1981), British film and television actor

== Sportspeople ==
- Jack Warner (catcher) (1872–1943), American baseball catcher
- Jack Warner (pitcher) (born 1940), American baseball relief pitcher
- Jack Warner (third baseman) (1903–1986), American baseball third baseman
- Jack Warner (football executive) (born 1943), Trinidadian former football administrator and current politician
- Jack Warner (footballer, born 1911) (1911–1980), Welsh football player with Swansea Town, Manchester United and Oldham
- Jack Warner (footballer, born 1898) (1898–1950), English football inside forward, played for Man. City, Watford and Thames
- Jack Warner (footballer, born 1883) (1883–1948), English football full-back, played for Preston NE, Southampton and Portsmouth

== Other(s) ==
- Jack Warner, founder of the Westervelt Warner Museum of American Art

== See also ==
- Jackie Warner (disambiguation)
- John Warner (disambiguation)
- Warner (disambiguation)
