= David Booth =

David Booth may refer to:

- David Booth (basketball) (born 1970), American professional basketball player
- David Booth (football manager) (born 1948), English football manager in England and India
- David Booth (ice hockey) (born 1984), American hockey player
- David Booth (lexicographer) (1766–1846), Scottish writer
- David A. Booth (born 1938), British scientist in the field of food intake-related behaviour
- David G. Booth (born c. 1946), investment manager and donor to the University of Chicago and the University of Kansas

== See also ==
- Peter Booth (priest) (1907–1993), born David Herbert Booth, British priest and headmaster
- David Gore-Booth (1943–2004), British diplomat
