= Verner (name) =

Verner is a Scandinavian name of Germanic origins from the given name Werner. Verner is common both as a given name and a surname. It means "protector". People with the name Verner include:

== Given name ==
Verner
- Pronunciation: Swedish: [ˈvæ̌ːɳər]
- Gender: Male

Origin
- Origin: Germanic
- Region of origin: Scandinavia

Other names
- Related names: Werner, Wernher

- Verner Clapp
- Verner Clarges
- Ove Verner Hansen
- Verner von Heidenstam
- Verner Emil Hoggatt, Jr.
- Verner Järvinen
- Verner Lehtimäki
- Verner Lindberg (1852–1909), Finnish politician
- Verner Main
- Elmer Verner McCollum
- Percy Verner Noble
- Verner Panton
- Verner E. Suomi
- Verner Weckman
- Gerald Verner White

== Surname ==
Verner
Origin
- Region of origin: Germanic

Other names
- Variant form: Vernersen

- Alterraun Verner (b. 1988), American footballer
- Elizabeth O'Neill Verner (1883–1979), American artist, author
- Frank Verner (1883–1966), American middle and long-distance runner
- Frederick Arthur Verner (1836–1928), Canadian painter
- Josée Verner (b. 1959), Canadian politician
- Karl Verner (1846–1896), Danish linguist
- Linda Verner (1855–1892), British singer and actress
- Mary Verner (b. 1956), American local government politician
- Miroslav Verner (b. 1941), Czech egyptologist
- Paul Verner (1911–1986), German politician
- Samuel Phillips Verner (1873–1943), American missionary and African explorer
- Tomáš Verner (b. 1986), Czech figure skater
- Sir William Edward Hercules Verner, 3rd Baronet (1855–1886), British baronet
- William Willoughby Cole Verner (1852–1922) a British ornithologist

== See also ==
- Werner
- Wernher
