= Gasnier =

Gasnier is a surname, originally Garnier. Notable people with the surname include:

- Louis J. Gasnier (1875-1963), French film director
- Julie Estelle Gasnier (born 1989), Indonesian actress
- Mark Gasnier (born 1981), Australian rugby league player, nephew of Reg
- Reg Gasnier (born 1939), Australian rugby league player
