= Hymn to Intellectual Beauty =

1817 poem by Percy Bysshe Shelley

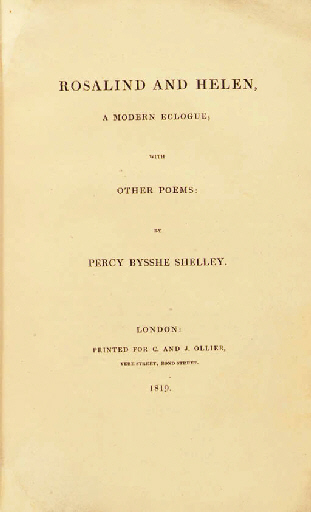
"Hymn to Intellectual Beauty" appeared in Rosalind and Helen, 1819.

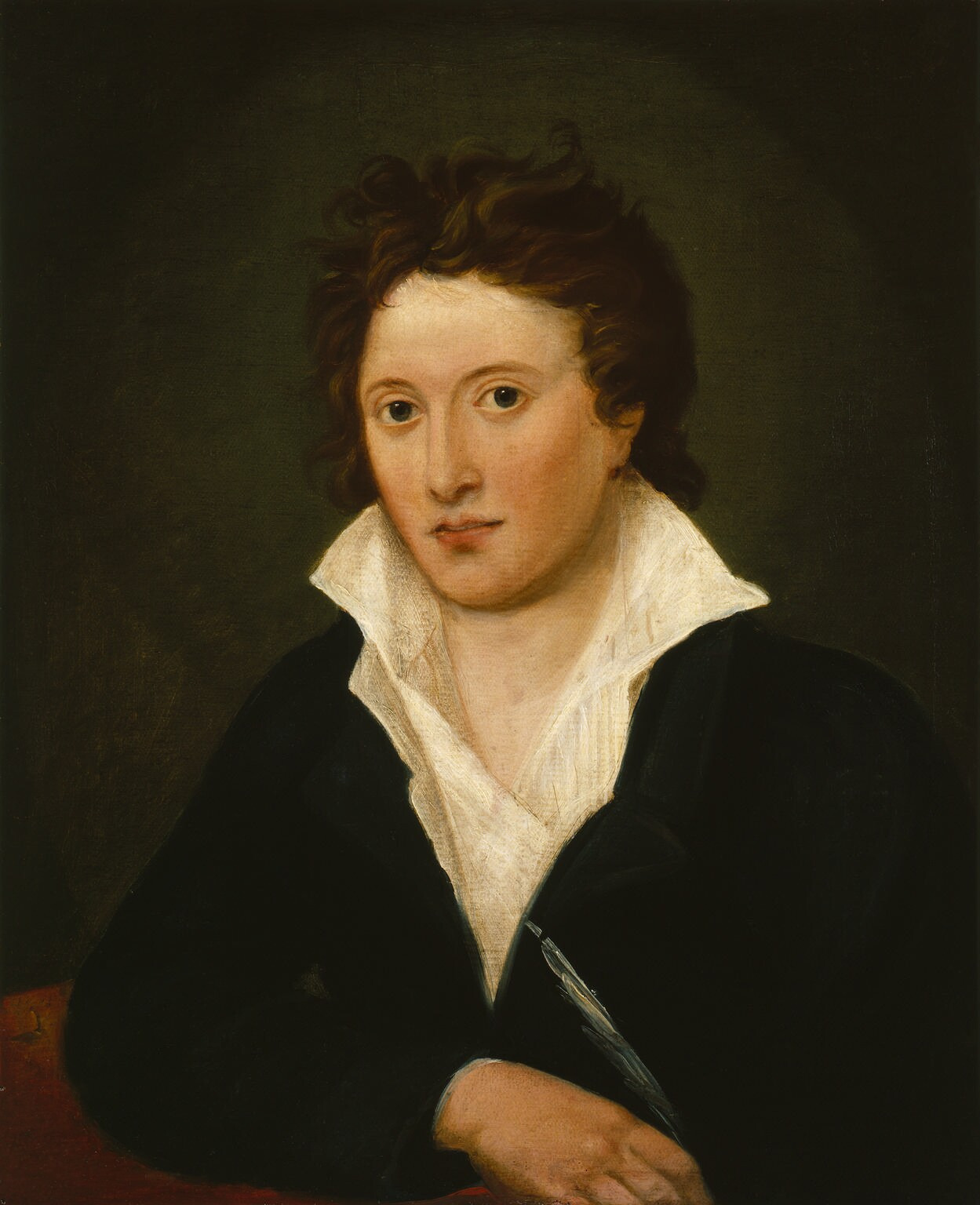
Percy Bysshe Shelley painted by Amelia Curran in 1819

"Hymn to Intellectual Beauty" is a poem written by Percy Bysshe Shelley in 1816 and published in 1817 in The Examiner and in the Rosalind and Helen collection in 1819.

== Composition and publication ==
"Hymn to Intellectual Beauty" was written during the summer of 1816 while Percy and Mary Shelley stayed with Lord Byron near Lake Geneva, Switzerland. Percy Shelley sent a finished copy of the poem to his friend Leigh Hunt who immediately lost it. Shelley was therefore forced to create another finished draft of the poem and resend the poem. It was eventually published in Hunt's Examiner on 19 January 1817. The poem also appeared in the 1819 collection Rosalind and Helen, A Modern Eclogue; With Other Poems printed by C. H. Reynell for Charles and James Ollier in London and in Miscellaneous and Posthumous Poems of Percy Bysshe Shelley by William Benbow in 1826 in London. After the initial publication, Percy Shelley corrected lines 27 and 58 but made no other changes. A second finished version was discovered in December 1976 in the Scrope Davies Notebook; it was written in Mary Shelley's hand and contained many differences from the first published edition.

== Summary ==
The shadow of a strange power floats unseen throughout the world, entering into man, coming and going mysteriously. Shelley asks this shadow, which he calls a "Spirit of Beauty," where it has gone and why it disappears and leaves us desolate. Then he acknowledges that it is vain to ask this question; one might as well ask why rainbows disappear or why man can both love and hate, despair and hope. No voice from another world has ever answered these questions. The "names of Demon, Ghost, and Heaven" are the record of men's vain attempts to get answers to such questions. Only the light of the Spirit of Beauty gives grace and truth to the restless dream which life is. If the Spirit of Beauty remained constantly with man, man would be immortal and omnipotent. It nourishes human thought. The poet beseeches this spirit not to depart from the world. Without it, death would be an experience to be feared.

In his youth, Shelley sought spiritual reality in ghosts and the dead. In his search, the shadow of the Spirit of Beauty suddenly fell on him and filled him with elation. He vowed that he would dedicate himself to this Spirit and he has kept his vow. He is convinced that it will free the world from the state of slavery in which it is. He prays that this power will bring calm to his life, for he worships it. It has taught him to fear himself and love all mankind.

== Poem ==
"Hymn to Intellectual Beauty" is an 84-line ode that was influenced by Jean-Jacques Rousseau's novel of sensibility Julie, or the New Heloise and William Wordsworth's "Ode: Intimations of Immortality". Although the theme of the ode, glory's departure, is shared with Wordsworth's ode, Shelley holds a differing view of nature:

The awful shadow of some unseen Power
Floats through unseen among us, – visiting
This various world with as inconstant wing
As summer winds that creep from flower to flower. –
Like moonbeams that behind some piny mountain shower,
It visits with inconstant glance
Each human heart and countenance;
Like hues and harmonies of evening
Like clouds of starlight widely spread,
Like memories of music fled,
Like aught that for its grace may be –
Dear, and yet dearer for its mystery.

The second stanza begins with the narrator addressing Intellectual Beauty:

Spirit of Beauty, that dost consecrate
With thine own hues all thou dost shine upon
Of human thought or form, – where art thou gone?
Why dost thou pass away and leave our state,
This dim vast vale of tears, vacant and desolate? (Lines 13–17)
Ask why sunlight not forever,
Weaves rainbows o'er yon mountain river.
Why aught should fail and fade that once is shown,
Why fear and dream and death and birth,
Cast on the daylight of this earth such gloom –
Why does man have such a scope
For love and hate, despondency and hope?

But he is not answered, as he reveals in stanza three:

No voice from some sublimer world hath ever
To sage or poet these responses given –
Therefore the name of God and ghosts and Heaven,
Remain the records of their vain endeavour, (Lines 25–28)

The fourth stanza reveals three values:

Love, Hope, and Self-esteem, like clouds depart
And come, for some uncertain moments lent.
Man were immortal, and omnipotent,
Didst thou, unknown and awful as thou art,
Keep with thy glorious train firm state within his heart. (Lines 36–41)

Shelley replaces the third of the Christian values, faith, with self-esteem, which signifies respect for the human imagination. According to the narrator, we have only temporary access to these values and can only attain them through Intellectual Beauty:

Thou messenger of sympathies,
That wax and wane in lovers's eyes-
Thou – that to human thought art nourishment,
Like darkness to a dying flame!
Depart not as thy shadow came,
Depart not – lest the grave should be,
Like life and fear, a dark reality. (Lines 42–48)

In stanza five, he reveals:

While yet a boy I sought for ghosts, and sped
Through many a listening chamber, cave and ruin,
And starlight wood, with fearful steps pursuing
Hopes of high talk with the departed dead. (Lines 49–52)

The words he speaks, possibly referring to Christian doctrines, brought him no response. It was not until he mused on life that he was able to experience a sort of religious awakening and learn of Intellectual Beauty:

Sudden, thy shadow fell on me;
I shrieked, and clasped my hands in ecstasy! (Lines 59–60)

Once he learns of Intellectual Beauty, he makes a vow, which begins stanza six:

I vowed that I would dedicate my powers
To thee and thine – have I not kept the vow?

Stanza seven continues with the vow:

Thus let thy power, which like the truth
Of nature on my passive youth
Descended, to my onward life supply
Its calm – to one who worships thee,
And every form containing thee,
Whom, Spirit fair, thy spells did bind
To fear himself, and love all human kind. (Lines 78–84)

The narrator breaks from the Wordsworthian tradition by realising that Intellectual Beauty, and not manifestations of it in nature, is what should be worshipped. The imagination, and not nature, is connected to truth, and the narrator realises that he should revere his own imagination and the imagination of others.

=== Variations ===
The first published edition varies from both the copy found in the Scrope Davies Notebook copy of the poem and the original manuscript draft in terms of language and philosophical view.

== Themes ==
Shelley's understanding of Beauty as an ideal and universal aspect, as opposed to the common understanding of the word as an aesthetic judgment of an object, was influenced by his knowledge of Plato's writings. However, where Plato believed Beauty should be sought after gradually in degrees until one can achieve true Beauty, a process made possible through dialectic, Shelley believed that Beauty could also be found through its earthly manifestations and could only be connected to through the use of the imagination. The origins of Shelley's understanding of Beauty and how to attain it can be found within "Hymn to Intellectual Beauty". The poem's theme is Beauty, but Shelley's understanding of how the mind works is different from Plato's: Plato wrote (principally in the Symposium) that Beauty is a metaphysical object existing independent of our experiences of particular concrete objects, while Shelley believed that philosophy and metaphysics could not reveal truth and that an understanding of Beauty was futile. Instead, Beauty could only be felt and its source could not be known.

== Analysis ==
The "Hymn to Intellectual Beauty" was conceived and written during a boating excursion with Byron on Lake Geneva, Switzerland, in June 1816. The beauty of the lake and of the Swiss Alps is responsible for Shelley's elevating what he calls "Intellectual Beauty" to the ruling principle of the universe.

Alpine scenery was new to Shelley and unutterably beautiful. He was profoundly moved by it, and the poem, he wrote to Leigh Hunt, was "composed under the influence of feelings which agitated me even to tears." Thanks to the Alps, Shelley, who had given up Christianity, had at last found a deity which he could wholeheartedly adore. The worship of beauty is Shelley's new religion, and it is significant that he calls his poem a hymn, a term used almost exclusively for religious verse. Later, in August 1817, Shelley read Plato's Symposium and his faith in beauty was no doubt strengthened by Plato's discussion of abstract beauty in that work and in the Phaedrus, which Shelley read in August 1818. It was daily intercourse with stunning beauty, not Plato, however, that brought Shelley to his new faith. Joseph Barrell, in Shelley and the Thought of His Time: A Study in the History of Ideas, has shown that the "Hymn" is not Platonic.

The central idea of "Hymn to Intellectual Beauty" is that there is a spiritual power that stands apart from both the physical world and the heart of man. This power is unknown to man and invisible, but its shadow visits "this various world with as inconstant wing / As summer winds that creep from flower to flower" and it visits also "with inconstant glance / Each human heart and countenance." When it passes away it leaves "our state, / This dim vast vale of tears, vacant and desolate." Shelley does not profess to know why Intellectual Beauty, which he calls "unknown and awful," is an inconstant visitor, but he is convinced that if it kept "with [its] glorious train firm state" within man's heart, man would be "immortal and omnipotent." But since the Spirit of Beauty visits the world and man's heart with such irregularity, Shelley pleads with his deity rather than praises it. It remains remote and inaccessible. In the concluding stanza Shelley is a suppliant praying that the power of the Spirit of Beauty will continue to supply its calm "to one who worships thee, / And every form containing thee."

In Stanza V, Shelley confesses that in his youth, while he was searching for spiritual reality, chiefly by reading Gothic romances, the shadow of Intellectual Beauty suddenly fell on him. He shrieked and clasped his hands in ecstasy. As a consequence of this experience, he tells us in Stanza VI, he vowed that he would dedicate his "powers / To thee and thine," and he has kept his vow. The experience also left him with the hope that the Spirit of Beauty would free "this world from its dark slavery." In this stanza, Shelley combined two of the major interests of his life, love of beauty and love of freedom.

In regard to the "Intellectual Beauty" of the title, Barrell remarked that it implies an approach by means of the mental faculties but that Shelley meant to convey the idea that his concept of beauty was abstract rather than concrete. His approach is romantic and emotional. Shelley, however, thinks of his Spirit of Beauty as personal, like the God of Christianity. He addresses it, pleads with it, worships it, but is using only the rhetorical device of personification.
