= Bibliothèque bleue =

Genre of Early Modern French literature

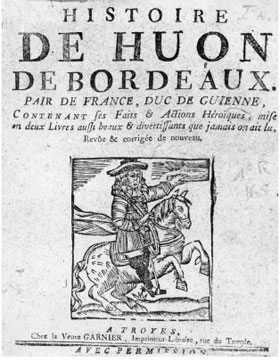
Huon of Bordeaux, printed in Troyes by the Widow Oudot (Anne Hussard) c. 1720

Bibliothèque bleue ("blue library" in French) is a type of ephemera and popular literature published in Early Modern France (between c. 1602 and c. 1830), comparable to the English chapbook and the German Volksbuch. As was the case in England and Germany, the literary format appealed to all levels of French society, transcending social, sex, and age barriers.

The term Bibliothèque bleue originates in a publishing scheme introduced 1602 in Troyes by the brothers Jean and Nicolas Oudot, in association with the family of Claude Garnier, who had been printer to the king. Oudot produced prints in low quality and small format. Sold with a blue paper cover, these brochure-like products came to be known as livres bleus, or "blue books".

The content matter was at first limited to local ephemera, but it was soon popularized and imitated in other cities such as Rouen, Angers, Caen, Limoges, Avignon, Dinan, Épinal, sold in urban bookshops and taken into the countryside by itinerant colporteurs (peddlers). This wide distribution represented the historical origin of "popular mass media" in France. Later in the 17th century, the Bibliothèque bleue in Troyes became a family business run by the sons of Jean Oudot, Jean II and Jacques I, later Nicolas II and Nicolas III. The Oudot business soon encountered competition, notably by the Garnier family.

In 1665, Nicolas III married the daughter of a Paris bookseller and established himself in the capital, and began to publish in great quantities, on subject matters including theatre, storybook (especially prose retellings of medieval verse novels such as Fierabras, Robert le Diable, and Jean de Paris), satire (roman picaresque), religious literature, almanacs, manuals on etiquette, cookbooks, songbooks and astrology. After the death of Nicholas II, his widow continued the Troyes business, and became known throughout the kingdom as the veuve Oudot (widow Oudot), by the 18th century attaining a near-monopoly in the genre.

Oudot went out of business in 1760, due to new legislation limiting the right to reprint works. Garnier persisted into the Republican era, but went bankrupt 1830, as their business model had become outdated and could no longer compete with modern forms of printing publishing led by Louis Hachette, and as a result of the centralization of the primary educational system.

A significant collection of Bibliothèque bleue volumes is located at the Médiathèque du Grand Troyes.

== See also ==
- Bouquinistes
- Pulp magazine
- Colportage

== Bibliography ==
- Lise Andries, La bibliothèque bleue au dix-huitième siècle : une tradition éditoriale, Oxford, The Voltaire Foundation, 1989
- Alexandre Assier, La Bibliothèque bleue depuis Jean Oudot 1er jusqu'à M. Baudot (1600-1863), Paris, Champion, 1874
- Geneviève Bollème, La Bibliothèque bleue, éd. Éditions Julliard, collection Archives, 1971, rééd. Robert Laffont, 2003
- René Helot, La Bibliothèque Bleue en Normandie, Rouen, Lainé, 1928, orné de 40 planches de gravures
- Marie-Dominique Leclerc & Alain Robert, Desbloéditions au succès populaire, les livrets de la Bibliothèque bleue XVII-XIXe siècles : présentation, anthologie, catalogue, Troyes, C.D.D.P., 1986
- Robert Mandrou,De la culture populaire aux XVIIe et XVIIIe siècles : la Bibliothèque bleue, Paris, Imago, 1985
- Charles Nisard, Histoire des livres populaires, ou de la littérature de Colportage, depuis le XVe siècle, jusqu'à l'établissement des la Commission d'examen des livres du Colportage, 1852
- La Bibliothèque bleue et les littératures de colportage, Actes du colloque organisé par la Bibliothèque municipale à vocation régionale de Troyes en collaboration avec l'École nationale des Chartes, Troyes, 12-13 novembre 1999
- Socard: Livres populaires imprimés à Troyes de 1600 à 1800. Paris 1864
- Gérard Oberlé: La Bibliothèque Bleue. Livres de colportage du XVIIe au XIXe siècle. Montigny-sur-Canne 1983.
