= Stop Hate UK =

British anti-discrimination charity

Stop Hate UK is a UK charity based in Leeds and dedicated to 'raising awareness and understanding of discrimination and hate crime, encouraging its reporting, and supporting the individuals and communities it affects'.

== History ==
Stop Hate UK started life in 1995 as Leeds Racial Harassment Project, a service for victims of racial harassment. The project was established in direct response to the murder of Stephen Lawrence. The Stop Hate telephone line was launched in 2006, in response to Recommendation 16 of The Stephen Lawrence Inquiry, which reads:

“That all possible steps should be taken by Police Services at local level in consultation with local Government and other agencies and local communities to encourage the reporting of racist incidents and crimes. This should include:
- the ability to report at locations other than police stations; and
- the ability to report 24 hours a day.”

In 2007 the remit of the organisation was expanded to cover reporting services and campaigning on other strands of hate crime, and accordingly the organisation's name was changed to Stop Hate UK.

Stop Hate UK currently operates three help lines in the UK:

- Stop Hate Line
- Stop Transgender Hate Line
- Stop LGB and T (Lesbian, gay, bisexual and transgender) Hate Line

A Stop Learning Disability Hate Crime Line was also operated until 2015.

A new Hate Crime reporting App was launched in June 2016 to aid witnesses and those targeted because of their identity, throughout West Yorkshire, to report incidents of Hate Crime and be able to access information and advice about Hate Crime services. Development of the application was made possible by funding from the Police and Crime Commissioner of West Yorkshire, as part of the Supporting Victims of Hate Crime Fund.

In August 2016, Stop Hate UK published a report highlighting the growth in hate incident reporting following the UK's vote to leave the EU on 23 June 2016. The report highlighted a 61% increase in call volume during the 4 weeks directly after the referendum result was known compared to the 4 week period prior to the vote.

== Public support ==
Many police services recognize that reporting hate crime is not easy and it is therefore people affected need supportive ways of reporting it. For example, Derbyshire Police Constabulary state:

We recognise that not everyone wants, or is able, to report hate crimes and incidents directly to the police. Therefore in Derbyshire reports and initial support and advice can be accessed via the independent charity Stop Hate UK."

Merseytravel works with Merseyside Police, Liverpool, St. Helens and Wirral Councils and Stop Hate UK to promote a Stop Hate campaign across public transport on Merseyside.

Stop Hate UK and the wheat organisation 17-24-30 organise an annual National Hate Crime Awareness Week, which in 2015 ran from 10–17 October. In 2016 the week will take place from Saturday 8 October – Saturday 15 October. In promoting National Hate Crime Awareness Week, UK Prime Minister David Cameron said: "We will continue to support communities and charities like Stop Hate UK and 17-24-30 so that victims are heard, perpetrators face justice and communities are protected."

The patrons of Stop Hate UK are Baroness Doreen Lawrence, Canon Mark Oakley and sportsperson Adrian Derbyshire.
