= Gérard Oberlé =

French writer and bibliographer (born 1945)

Gérard Oberlé (born 27 November 1945, Saverne) is a French writer and bibliographer.

== Origin and biography ==
Born in Alsace, of parents from Lorraine originating from Dabo where his grandfather was a clog maker, Gérard Oberlé spent there his summers. An adolescent in Switzerland by the Jesuits at Fribourg, then a student in classical literature in Strasbourg and The Sorbonne, he became an auxiliary master of Latin and ancient Greek in Metz, but must quickly leave teaching.

== Ancient books ==
In 1967–1968, he became a bookseller of used books, after reading a small advertisement. In 1971 he opened his own shop. He has lived since 1976 in a manor house of Nivernais where he has published various specialized catalogs on peddler literature, roman noir, literary cranks, or else neo-Latin poetry in Europe from the XVIth to the XIXe.

He is an expert at the Court of Appeal of Bourges, an expert approved by the National Company of Experts. Passionate about humanism and scholarship, he has, in his researches and works, given priority to works ignored by the culture officially taught (among which Jean-Baptiste Chassignet, author, in 1594, of Mépris de la vie): The baroque poets, the bizarre, paraliterature, the little romantics, and so on. He has reprinted the Légendes et chants de gestes canaques by Louise Michel, as well as various other forgotten works. As an editor, he published collections by Norge, Lucienne Desnoues, Jean-Claude Carrière, John Roman Baker|, Jean-Pierre Luminet and Jules Roy.

== Literature and bibliography ==
In 1989, the Éditions Belfond published his Les Fastes de Bacchus et de Comus, a bibliographic catalog of an important collection of gastronomy books. In 1992, he wrote the catalog Kilian Fritsch, a book collector on wine and oenology, whose library was scattered during a sale organized by Guy Loudmer in 1993.

In 2000, he became a writer, his first novel was a detective one. He is also a chronicler at France Musique. in the américan magazine Men's Journal and Lire and since 2012 at Lire He has a correspondence with Jim Harrison which partly appeared in Raw and the Cooked: Adventures of a Roving Gourmand in 2001.

== Publications ==
- 1972: De Horace Walpole… à Jean Ray : l’évolution du roman noir, gothique et frénétique, Manoir de Pron
- 1983: La Bibliothèque bleue : livres de colportage du XVIIe au XIXe siècle, Montigny-sur-Canne, Manoir de Pron
- 1985: Fous à lire, fous à lier : ouvrages écrits par des hétéroclites, fous littéraires, autodidactes, bizarres et autres, Manoir de Pron
- 1986: La Bibliothèque Bleue en Normandie (with a notice on René Helot) : livres de colportage de Rouen et Caen du XVIIe au XIXe siècle, Manoir de Pron
- 1988: Les Poètes néo-latins en Europe du XIe au XXe siècle, Manoir de Pron
- 1988: Louise Michel : légendes et chants de gestes canaques, présentation édition 1900
- 1989: Les Fastes de Bacchus et de Comus, ou histoire du boire et du manger en Europe de l'Antiquité à nos jours, à travers les livres, Paris, Éditions Belfond, (1181 volumes described with bibliographical, historical, anecdotal information)
- 1992 Hécatongraphie, Manoir de Pron
- 1992: Une bibliothèque bachique : collection Kilian Fritsch, Loudmer
- 1993: Léon Cladel, le rural écarlate 1835–1892 : livres, correspondances et manuscrits ; notices by Pierre Saunier, Manoir de Pron
- 1996: Auguste Poulet-Malassis, un imprimeur sur le Parnasse : ses ancêtres, ses auteurs, ses amis, ses écrits, Montigny-sur-Canne, Manoir de Pron, et Imprimerie Alençonnaise
- 2000: Nil Rouge, Éditions Gallimard
- 2000: Pera Palas, Le Cherche-midi
- 2002: Palomas Canyon, Le Cherche-midi
- 2002: Bibliothèque bachique de M. Bernard Chwartz, Books and ancient and modern documents on wine, viticulture and oenology, Paris
- 2002: Salami, Actes Sud, (in collab. with Hans Gissinger)
- 2003: La vie est un tango, collection of his chronicles broadcast on France Musique from 2001 to 2003, Flammarion
- 2004: Retour à Zornhof, Grasset et Fasquelle, (Prix des Deux Magots)
- 2005: Passion-Livre, Gérard Oberlé : exposition médiathèque Jean-Jaurès - Nevers, 26 November 2005 – 14 January 2006.- Nevers : Bibliothèque Municipale de Nevers
- 2006: Itinéraire spiritueux, Grasset et Fasquelle
- 2007: La vie est ainsi fête, collection of chronics broadcast on France Musique from 2003 to 2004, Éditions Grasset
- 2009: Mémoires de Marc-Antoine Muret, Grasset et Fasquelle
- 2012: Émilie, une aventure épistolaire, Grasset et Fasquelle
- 2016: Bonnes nouvelles de Chassignet, Grasset et Fasquelle, - Finalist of the Prix Alexandre-Vialatte)
