= Ferdinando Warner =

Anglican vicar and historian (1703–1768)

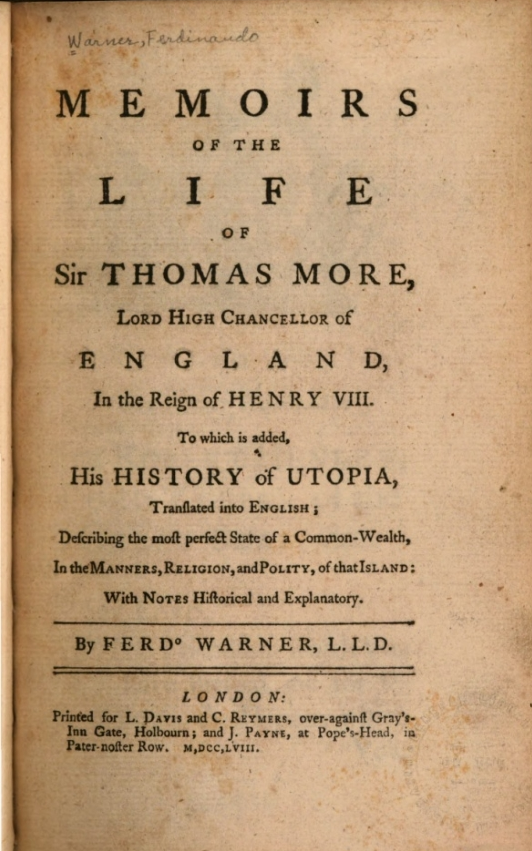
Cover of Warner's 1758 biography of philosopher and statesman Sir Thomas More, which includes a translation of his Utopia

Ferdinando Warner (1703–3 October 1768) was an English preacher, Church of England vicar and writer of history, theology and biography. His principal works were histories of Ireland and of its 17th-century rebellions and an ecclesiastical history. Well regarded through the nineteenth century, his modern reputation is mixed: noted for his innovative use of primary sources, but criticised for his dismissal of the Irish people and character.

== Life and priesthood ==
Warner was born in 1703 at Tewkesbury, Gloucestershire, where his father taught at a dissenting academy, including Thomas Secker, the future Archbishop of Canterbury (1758–68). Warner became vicar of the church in Rowde in Wiltshire in 1730 and then lived for a time in Lewisham, then a part of Kent. He was admitted to Clare College, Cambridge (Note: Many sources mistakenly cite Warner's education to having been at Jesus College, not Clare; according to Alumni Cantabrigienses, this is attributable to 'Cole'. Additionally, there is speculation about the origins of his LL.D., with Chalmers speculating it was at "some northern university." Another mistake could be the misspelling of the town of Rowde as 'Ronde'.) on 19 January 1742 [O.S. 8 January 1741] (Note: Before 1752, the calendar year in Great Britain began on 25 March and followed the Julian Calendar.) but apparently did not finish.

On 13 February 1747 [O.S. 2 February 1746], he became rector of the former church of St Michael Queenhithe in the City of London and twice preached before the Lord Mayor, Sir William Calvert. In 1754, he earned an LL.D. at Lambeth. He then served as rector of St Mary's Church, Barnes (then in Surrey, now a part of the London Borough of Richmond upon Thames) from 1758, where he died due to gout on 3 October 1768, aged 65. He also held senior roles in the governing Court of Governors of Sion College, becoming third assistant in 1757, first assistant in 1758, senior dean in 1759, president in 1764 and (necessarily) the immediate past president and past president, presumably through 1767. (Note: Presidents of Sion College serve a one-year term, from the conclusion of the year's General Meeting to the election of their replacement at the next year's General Meeting. The date of said meeting is variable. The immediate past president and two preceding presidents also hold roles on the Court.)

His son was John Warner, a classical scholar, preacher, writer and chaplain from 1790–95 to the British Embassy in France.

== Writing ==
Warner's writings covered many subjects and according to Irish history scholar Robert Dunlop "show him to have been a man of wide learning and more than ordinary ability." His earliest works centred on Church of England liturgy and theology, including a 1755 simulated debate on the nature of Revelation between Lord Bolingbroke and Robert Boyle. In 1758, he wrote a biography of Sir Thomas More and appended Gilbert Burnet's 1684 translation of Utopia from the Latin with "slight Alterations" for modernity. Its preface thanks Sir Robert Henley, 1st Earl of Northington, probably for having conferred upon him the rectory at Barnes.

According to biographer Alexander Chalmers, Warner's "most valuable" contribution was his two-volume Ecclesiastical History to the Eighteenth Century (1756–57), which church historian Johann Lorenz von Mosheim praised for "that noble spirit of liberty, candour, and moderation that seemed to have guided the pen of the judicious author." After its success, Warner went to Ireland in about 1761 to gather documents for a history of that island. He was given access to books and manuscripts in Marsh's Library and the Library of Trinity College Dublin and was supported by the historian Charles O'Conor in the hopes he might "write a justificatory history of the Irish" amidst prejudice against the Irish Catholics after the Rebellion of 1641.

However, the resultant work (The History of Ireland, Volume the First, 1763), which covered up to the Anglo-Norman invasion of 1171, included unfavourable generalisations, such as citing the "very strong and remarkable antipathy to all labour" of many Irish and their cynical contentment "in dirt and beggary, to a degree beyond all other people in Christendom." Furthermore, whereas O'Conor attributed the instability after the Viking invasion of Ireland to the failure of elective government, Warner cited the Irish "national disposition to quarrelling and contention". Although Warner claimed it was impartial, historianJoep Leerssen called The History "at times a hybrid of, and at times a vacillation between, the Gaelic and English attitudes", whose contemporary references "read like an uncomfortable combination of a Patriot-style concern for the poor's living conditions, with an old-fashioned dislike for Irish sordidness". Tobias Smollett wrote in The Critical Review after its publication that—

Had this writer studied to [increase] the number of those who are but too apt to ridicule the Irish nation, he could not have done it more effectually than by telling us (as in fact he does) in his preface, that they employed the author of Warner's Ecclesiastical, to write their Civil History; that they invited him from London to Dublin for the purpose; and even paid him for the trouble ... the number of gentlemen in Ireland who, without detracting from [Warner's] merits, are, in every respect, greatly his superiors in every qualification of a good historian; particularly that necessary one of critical knowledge ...

Another critic in The Monthly Review found his introduction absorbing but the history, and his treatment thereof, uninteresting—

... it is hoped the Reader will find more satisfaction, instruction, and amusement, in the remainder of this work, than, we apprehend, he will meet in the perusal of the present volume.

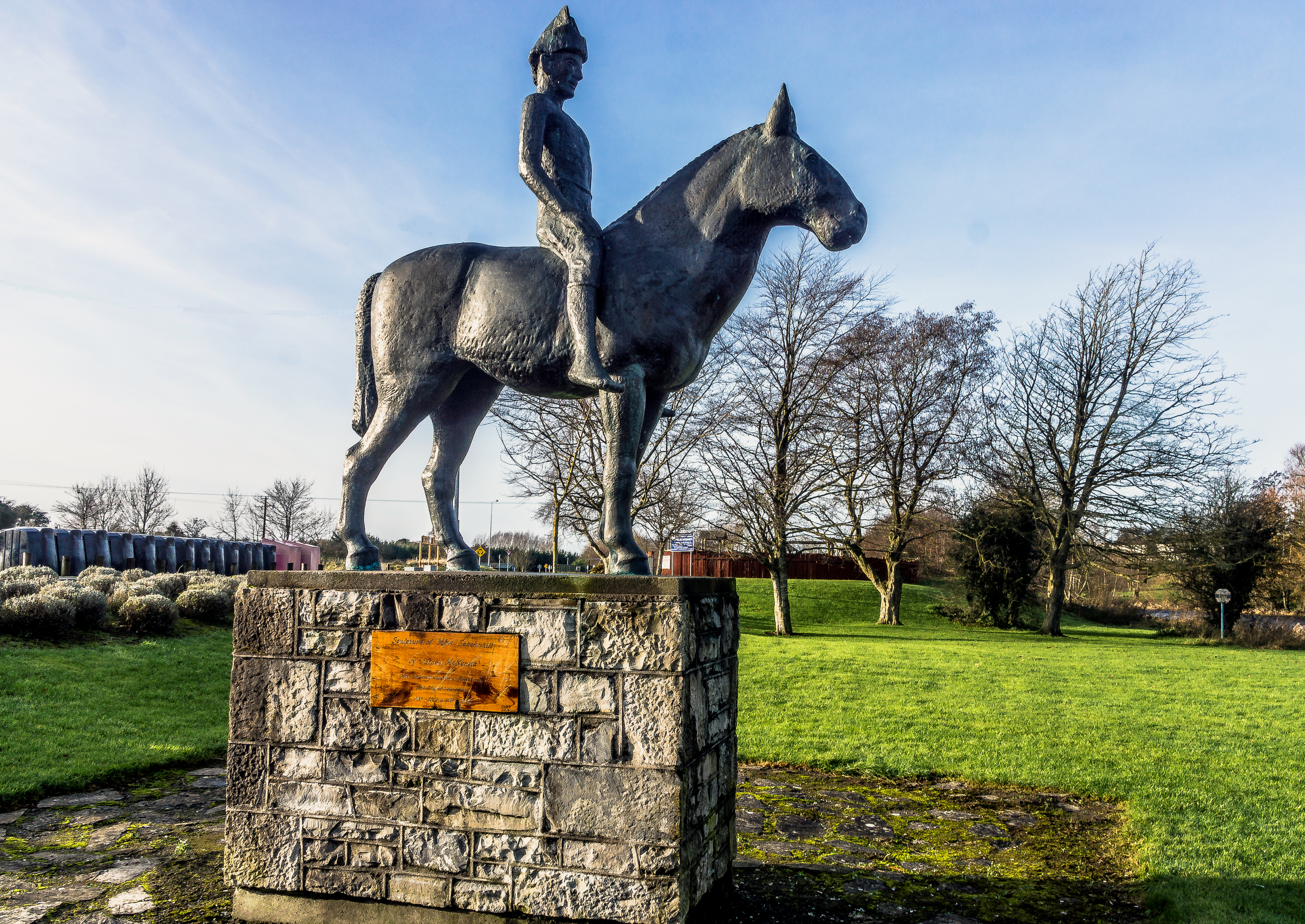
A statue in Trim, County Meath of Irish King Máel Sechnaill mac Domnaill (r. 980–1002 & 1014–22), who "wore the collar of gold" from a Dane he had defeated in combat, as depicted in Moore's "Let Erin remember the days of old"

Warner had intended to publish a second volume, which would have covered up to the reign of Charles I (1625–49), but did not because the Irish House of Commons refused to fund it. Leerssen argued that this experience did not bias Warner's next book, the History of the Rebellion and Civil Wars in Ireland (1767), which spanned from the 1641 Rebellion to the 1660 Restoration. Therein, he wrote, Warner kept "an impartial stance" and criticised the anti-Catholic penal laws enacted during the Protestant Ascendancy: "Warner does not deny Catholic guilt in the rebellion, but reduces the quantity of the outrages."

Warner also wrote one critique of poetry, commenting on James Macpherson's purported poems from the Gaelic bard Ossian in a published 1762 letter to Lord Lyttelton.

Warner contracted gout sometime in middle age, and dedicated his final work to its relief (A Full and Plain Account of the Gout, 1768). Chalmers lamented: "This was the most unfortunate of all his publications, for soon after imparting his cure for the gout he died of the disorder, and destroyed the credit of his system"; nevertheless, his Account was twice reprinted through 1772.

== Legacy ==
According to politician and biographer Alfred Webb, writing in 1878, The History of Ireland and the History of the Rebellion were still being "often referred to", while Dunlop in 1899 called the latter "impartial and singularly accurate". Essayist and historian William Edward Hartpole Lecky called Warner in 1892 "the best historian of the Rebellion." The following appraisal from Chalmers in 1817 praises Warner's diligence and sense of evidence—

Dr. Warner was a laborious man, and having deservedly attained the character of a judicious and useful writer, well as a popular preacher, he was frequently engaged in compilations for the booksellers, which, however, he executed in a very superior manner, and gave many proofs of diligent research and judgment, both in his reflections and in the use be made of his materials.

The History of Ireland was also read by Ireland's 'national poet' Thomas Moore, whose sentimental Irish Melodies (1808–34) discussed the prejudice faced by Irish Catholics and how accord may be reached with England. In fact, Moore cited Warner's account as the source and inspiration for two of the Melodies, "Rich and rare were the jewels she wore" and "Let Erin remember the days of old".

However, modern Irish historians looking to overcome the partial Catholic and Protestant interpretations of controversial events like the Rebellion of 1641 for an objective view have been less favourable of Warner's conclusions. John Gibney, for instance, conjectured that Warner was probably so confused by contemporary depositions when writing History of the Rebellion that he—

based his assessment of 1641 on documents that were far less problematic. This was plainly inadequate, but Warner deserves some credit for one simple reason: he actually looked at the originals. And very few people had ever done so.

== Works ==
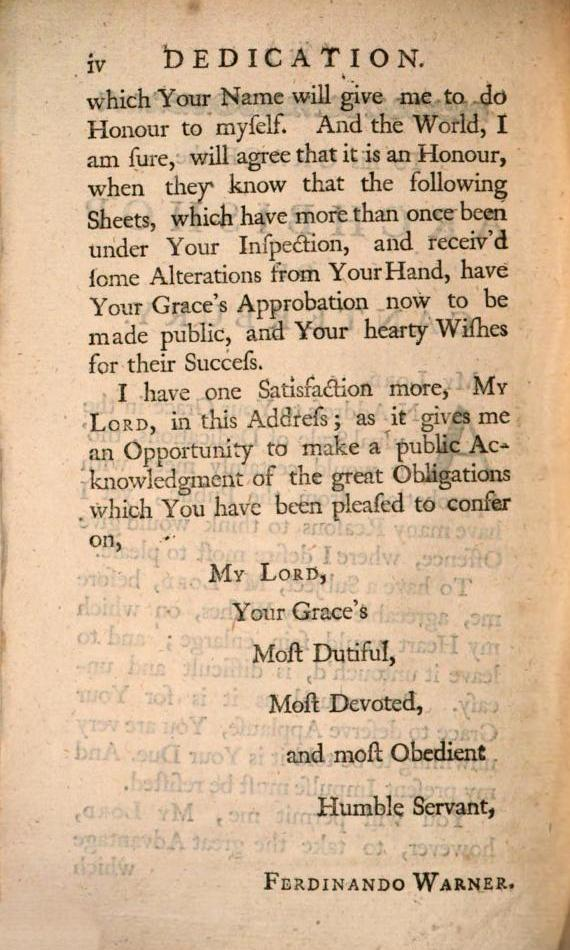
The dedication of Warner's A Scheme of a Fund... to the Archbishop of Canterbury, Thomas Herring

Bibliographies of Warner include and exclude different works. The following is that compiled by Bruce Stewart online. Note some titles are truncated.

- A Rational Defence of the English Reformation and Protestant Religion: in a series of discourses on the most essential points of controversy between protestants and papists, 1752.
- A Scheme of a Fund for the Better Maintenance of the Widows and Children of the Clergy, 1752.
  - Reprinted 1755 as Proposals for raising and establishing a fund, by the aid of Parliament, for a provision for the widows and children of the ministers of the Church of England.
- An illustration of the Book of common-prayer, and administration of the sacraments, and other Rites and Ceremonies of the Church of England, 1754 (published in weekly instalments Nov. 1752–53).
- A free and necessary enquiry, whether The Church of England, In her Liturgy, and Many of her learned Divines, In their Writings, Have not, by some unwary Expressions, relating to Transubstantiation, and the Real Presence, given so great an Advantage to Papists and Deists as may prove fatal to true Religion, unless some Remedy be speedily applied?, 1754.
  - Reprinted 1754 and 1755.
- Ecclesiastical History of England to the Eighteeth Century, 1756 (vol. 1) and 1757 (vol. 2).
  - Reprinted 1759 in two volumes as The History of England, as it relates to religion and the Church, from the earliest accounts to the present century.
- The History of Ireland, 1763 (vol. 1 and final).

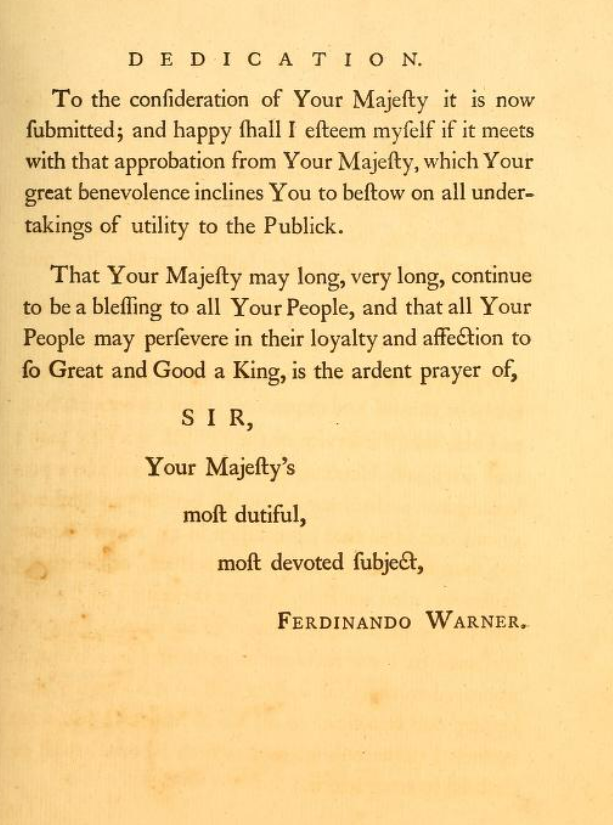
The dedication of Warner's The History of Ireland to the King of Great Britain, George III

  - Reprinted 1770 as The history of Ireland; from the earliest authentic accounts, to the year 1171: since which period it has been annexed to the crown of England. With a preliminary dissertation on the antient & present state & condition of that kingdom.
- The History of the Rebellion and Civil-war in Ireland, 1766.
  - Reprinted 1767 and 1768.
- Memoirs of the Life of Sir Thomas More: Lord High Chancellor of England, In the Reign of Henry VIII. To which is added, His History of Utopia, Translated into English; Describing the most perfect State of a Common-Wealth, In the Manners, Religion, and Polity, of that Island: With Notes Historical and Explanatory, 1758.
- Remarks on the history of Fingal, and other poems of Ossian: translated by Mr. Macpherson. In a letter to the Right Honourable the Lord L—, 1762.
- A Letter to the Fellows of Sion-college; and to all the clergy within the bills of mortality, and in the county of Middlesex. Humbly proposing their forming themselves into a society, for the maintenance of the widows and orphans of such clergymen. To which is added, a Sketch of some Rules and Orders suitable to that Purpose, 1764.
- A System of Divinity and Morality: in a series of discourses on all the essential parts of natural and revealed religion ..., 1766 (vols. 1–4).
- A Full and Plain Account of the Gout: from whence will be clearly seen, the folly, or the baseness, of all pretenders to the cure of it, 1768.
  - Reprinted 1769 and 1772.

Warner is also listed as the possible translator (alongside Thomas Nugent) of José Francisco de Isla's ecclesiastical satire:

- The History of the Famous Preacher Friar Gerund de Compazas: otherwise Gerund Zotes; translated from the Spanish, 1772 (vols. 1–2).
