= George Lambert (English painter) =

English painter

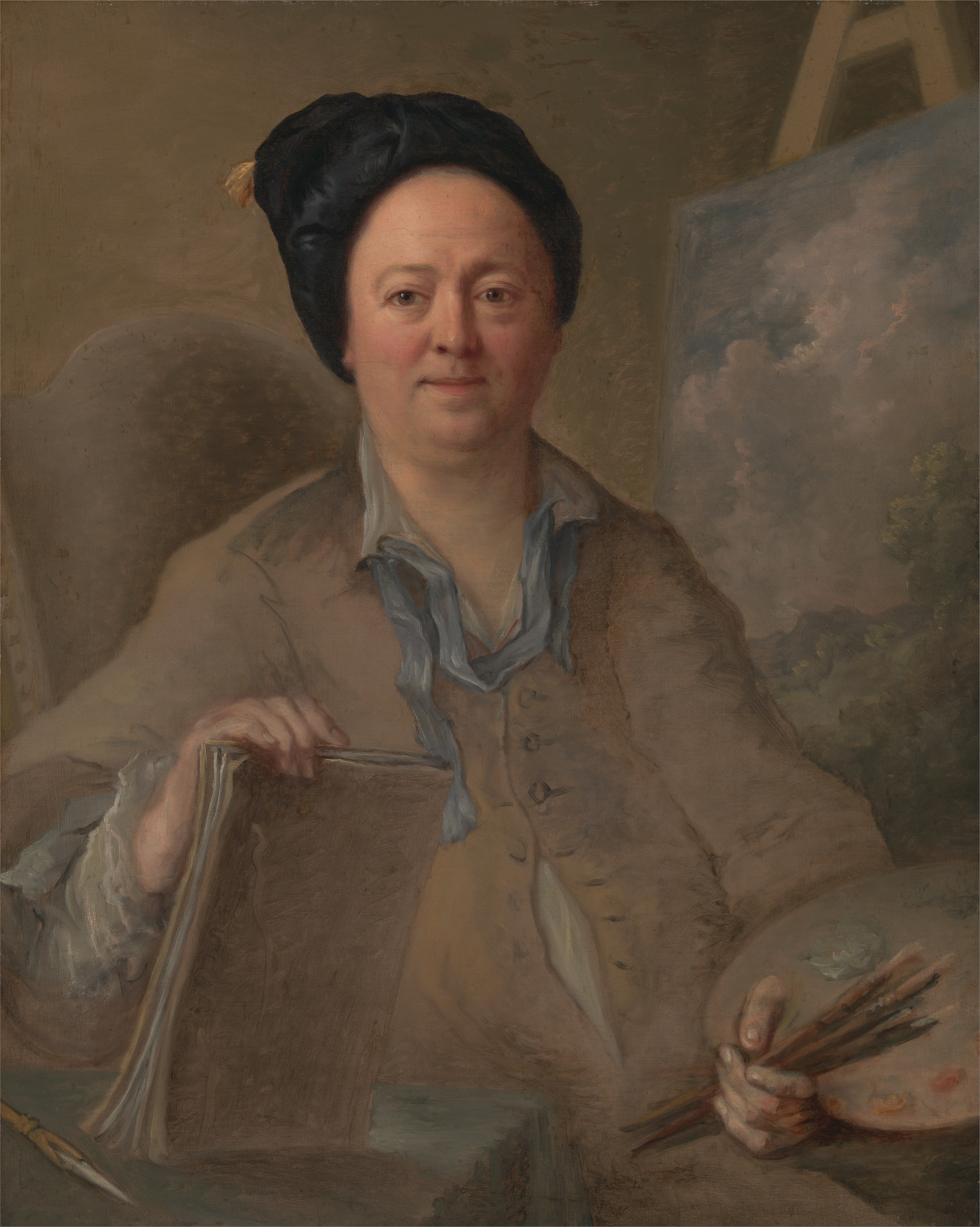
- Giles Hussey Portrait of a landscape painter, possibly George Lambert, between 1740 and 1750, Yale Center for British Art.
- Born: 1700; Kent, England
- Died: 30 November 1765 (aged 64–65); Covent Garden, London, England
- Known for: Landscape artist and theatre scene painter
- Movement: Society of Artists of Great Britain; Incorporated Society of Artists of Great Britain

George Lambert (1700 – 30 November 1765) was an English landscape artist and theatre scene painter. With Richard Wilson he is recognised as a pioneer of British landscape in art, for its own sake.

== Life and work ==
Lambert was born in Kent and studied art under Warner Hassells and John Wootton, soon attracting attention by the quality of his landscape painting. He painted many large and fine landscapes in the style of Gaspar Poussin and Salvator Rosa. Many of his landscapes were finely engraved by François Vivares, James Mason (1710–1785), and others, including a set of views of Plymouth and Mount Edgcumbe (painted conjointly with Samuel Scott), a view of Saltwood Castle in Kent, another of Dover, and a landscape presented to the Foundling Hospital in London.

Lambert also obtained a great reputation as a scene-painter, working at first for the Lincoln's Inn Fields Theatre, in London, under John Rich. When Rich moved to Covent Garden Theatre, Lambert secured the assistance of Amigoni, and together they produced scenery of far higher quality than any previously executed.

Lambert was a man of jovial temperament and shrewd wit, and frequently spent his evenings at work in his painting-loft at Covent Garden Theatre, to which men of note in the fashionable or theatrical world resorted to share his supper of a beef-steak, freshly cooked on the spot. Out of these meetings arose the well-known "Beefsteak Club" which long maintained a high social reputation. Most of Lambert's scene-paintings unfortunately perished when Covent Garden Theatre was destroyed by fire in 1808.

Lambert was a friend of William Hogarth and a member of the jovial society that met at 'Old Slaughter's' Tavern in St Martin's Lane. In 1755 he was one of the committee of artists who proposed a royal academy of arts in London. He was a member of the Society of Artists of Great Britain, exhibited with them in 1761 and the three following years, and during the same period contributed to the Academy exhibitions. In 1765 he and other members seceded and formed the Incorporated Society of Artists of Great Britain, of which he was elected the first president.

In conjunction with Samuel Scott, Lambert painted a series of Indian views for the old East India House in Leadenhall Street. He also etched two prints after Salvator Rosa. Lambert was associated in 1735 with George Vertue, Hogarth, and John Pine (engraver, 1660–1756) in obtaining a bill from parliament securing artists a copyright on their works. Lambert's portraits were painted by Thomas Hudson, John Vanderbank (engraved in mezzotint by John Faber the younger in 1727, and in line by H. Robinson and others), and Hogarth.

Lambert's most famous painting is A view of Box Hill, Surrey (1733) which depicts a well-known beauty spot south of London. Hogarth considered Lambert a rival to the famous French landscape painter Claude Lorrain (1600–1682) with respect to his use of soft light to unify the scene in this painting. Though he never visited Italy he was inspired by the classical tradition of landscape painting.

Lambert died on 30 November 1765 at his home on the Piazza in Covent Garden.

His pupils included John Inigo Richards (1731–1810) and John Collett (1725–1780).

== Gallery ==
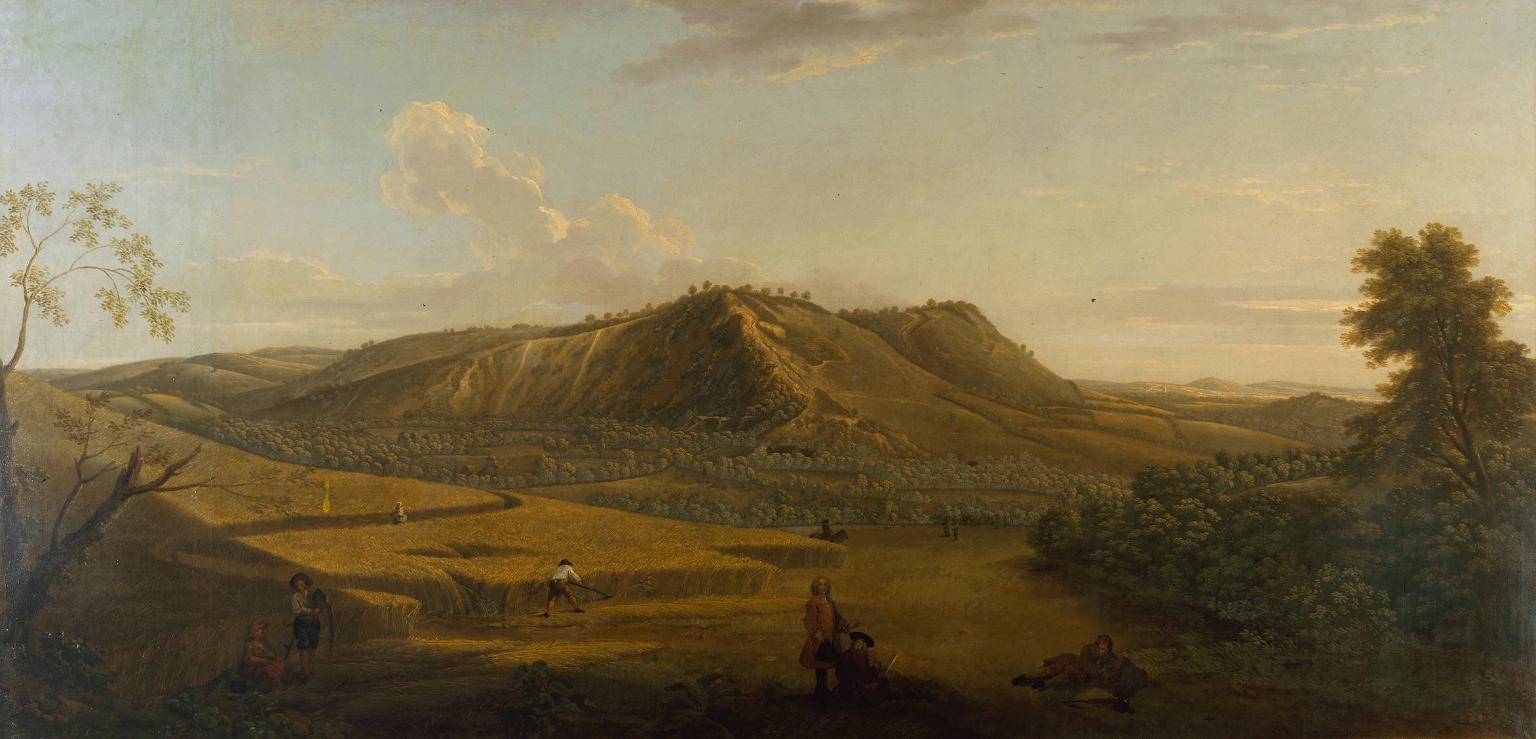
A view of Box Hill, Surrey, 1733.

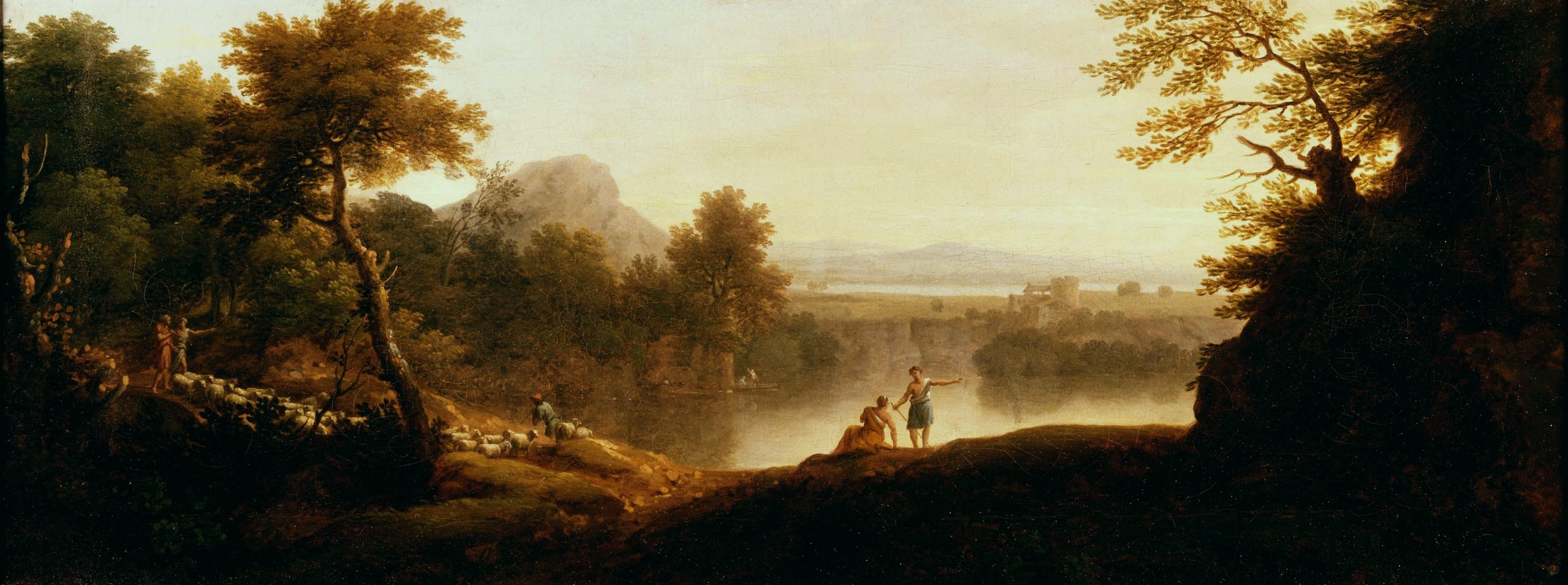
A Pastoral Landscape with Shepherds and their Flocks (1744).

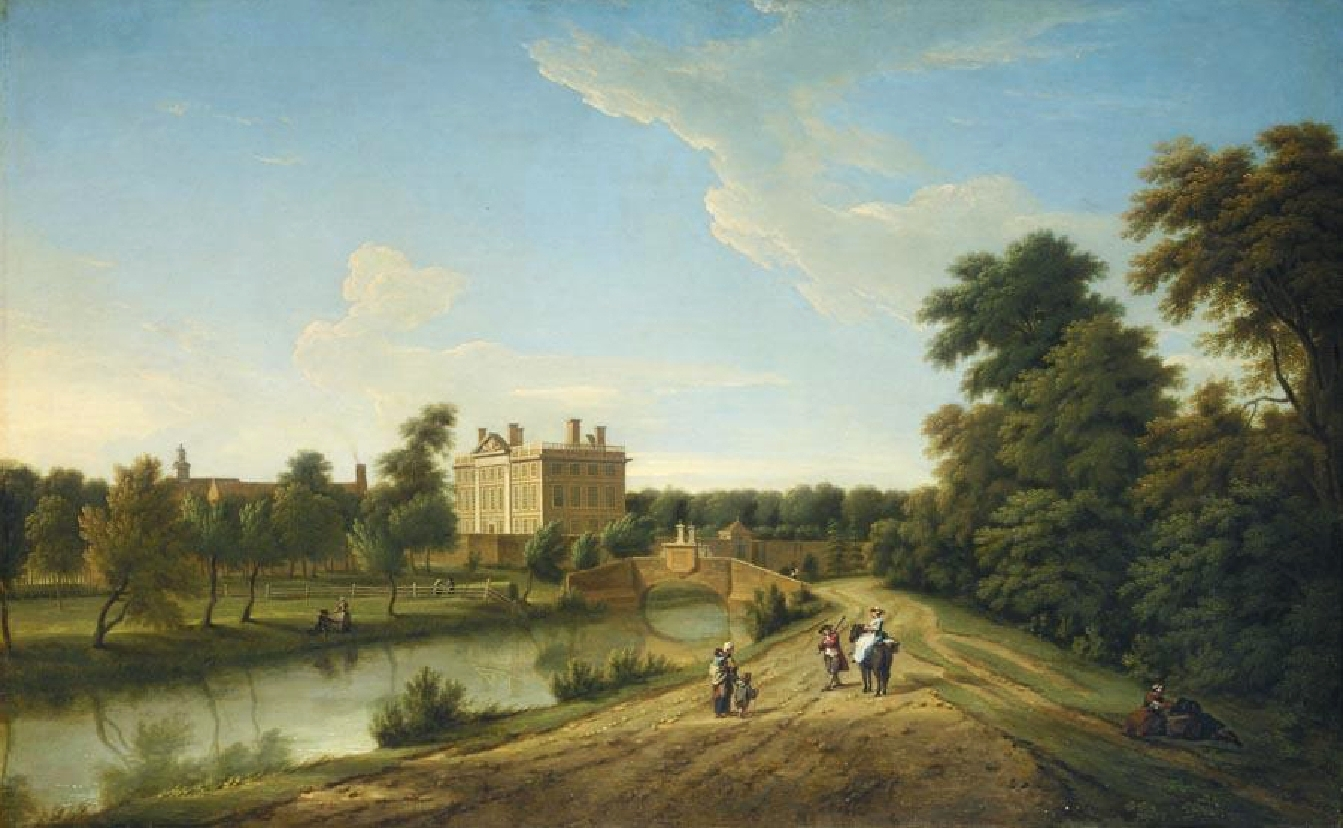
View of Dunton Hall, Lincolnshire, 1739, possibly the earliest image of a Plot Elm (centre).
