= Bill Warner =

Bill Warner may refer to:

- Bill Warner (American football) (1881–1944), American football player and coach
- Bill Warner (writer) (born 1941), writer and critic of Islam
- Bill Warner (motorcyclist) (1969–2013), American motorcycle racer

== See also ==
- William Warner (disambiguation)
