= Verner =

Verner may refer to:

- Verner (name), a given name and a surname (including a list of people with the name)
- Verner, Ontario, a town in Canada
- Verner's law, historical sound change in the Proto-Germanic language
- Verner Motor, a Czech aircraft engine manufacturer
  - Verner JCV 360, a Czech aircraft engine design
  - Verner VM 133, a Czech aircraft engine design

== See also ==
- Werner (disambiguation)
