= Wernher =

Wernher (German: [ˈvɛʁnhɛʁ]) is both a surname and a given name. Notable people with the name include:

== People with the surname ==
- Georgina Wernher, birth surname of British aristocrat
- Harold Augustus Wernher (1893–1973)
- Julius Wernher (1850–1912), German-born British Randlord and entrepreneur
- Wernher baronets, an extinct Baronetcy
- Lady Zia Wernher, elder daughter of Grand Duke Michael Mikhailovich of Russia

== People with the given name ==
- Bruder Wernher (fl. 1225–1250), poet
- Wernher von Braun (1912–1977), rocketry pioneer in Nazi Germany and subsequently the United States
- Wernher Schodeler (1490–1541), Swiss chronicler
- Wernher Steiner (1492–1542), chronicler of Zug
- Wernher von Homberg (1284–1320), knight

== See also ==
- Wernher Collection, an art collection housed at Ranger's House near London, England
- Wernher Open Pairs, an American bridge event
- Wernher Triptych, an ivory Byzantine triptych
- Werner (disambiguation)
- Verner (name)
- Werner (name)
