= Senator Warner =

Senator Warner may refer to:

== Members of the United States Senate ==
- John Warner (1927–2021), U.S. Senator from Virginia from 1979 to 2009
- Mark Warner (born 1954), U.S. Senator from Virginia since 2009
- Willard Warner (1826–1906), U.S. Senator from Alabama from 1868 to 1871
- William Warner (Missouri politician) (1840–1916), U.S. Senator from Missouri from 1905 to 1911

== United States state senate members ==
- Alexander Warner (1827–1914), Mississippi State Senate
- Andrew S. Warner (1819–1887), New York State Senate
- Charles J. Warner (1875–1955), Nebraska State Senate
- Clement Warner (1836–1916), Wisconsin State Senate
- Earle S. Warner (1880–1971), New York State Senate
- Elmer Warner (1861–1943), Pennsylvania State Senate
- Frank B. Warner (1863–?), Missouri State Senate
- Fred M. Warner (1865–1923), Michigan State Senate
- Hans Warner (1844–1896), Wisconsin State Senate
- Ivan Warner (1919–1994), New York State Senate
- Jerome Warner (1927–1997), Nebraska State Senate
- John Warner (North Dakota politician) (born 1952), North Dakota State Senate
- Oliver Warner (politician) (1841–1885), Massachusetts State Senate
- P. Dean Warner (1822–1910), Michigan State Senate
