= Frank Warner =

Frank Warner may refer to:

- Frank Warner (folklorist) (1903–1978), American folk song collector and performer
- Frank Warner (sound editor) (1926–2011), American sound editor
- Frank Warner (Shortland Street), fictional character on the New Zealand soap opera
- Frank B. Warner (1863–?), American politician, Missouri senator
- Frank W. Warner (1861–1919), Native American missionary
- Frank Wilson Warner (born 1938), American mathematician
