= James Derbyshire =

English footballer

Personal information
- Full name: James Edward Derbyshire
- Date of birth: 27 May 1882
- Place of birth: Tottington, England
- Date of death: 1945 (aged 65–66)
- Position: Full back

Senior career*
Years	Team	Apps	(Gls)
1900–1901	Hawks Lane St Mary's		
1901–1902	Turton		
1902–1903	Blackburn Rovers	11	(0)
1903	Nelson		
1903	Darwen		
1904	Turton		
Total		11	(0)
- * Club domestic league appearances and goals

James Edward Derbyshire (27 May 1882 – 1945) was an English footballer who played in the Football League for Blackburn Rovers.
