= Samuel Warner =

Samuel Warner may refer to:

- Samuel Alfred Warner (c. 1793–1853), English inventor of claimed naval weapons, now considered a charlatan
- Sam Warner (1887–1927), American film producer
- Samuel L. Warner (1828–1893), U.S. Representative from Connecticut
- Samuel A. Warner (1822–1897), American architect
- Sam Bass Warner (1889–1979), United States Copyright Office official
