= William Warner (Michigan politician, born 1806) =

American politician

Member of the Michigan House of Representatives from the Washtenaw County district
- In office February 5, 1851 – 1852

Personal details
- Born: 1806 Connecticut, US
- Died: Unknown
- Party: Republican

William Warner (born 1806) was an American politician in Michigan.

== Early life ==
Warner was born in 1806 in Connecticut.

== Career ==
Warner moved from Connecticut and settled on a farm in Dexter, Michigan Territory in 1824. Warner also worked in the lumber and hardware businesses. On November 5, 1850, Warner was elected to the Michigan House of Representatives where he represented the Washtenaw County district from February 5, 1851 to 1852.
