= Justice Warner =

Justice Warner may refer to:

- John Warner (judge) (born 1943), associate justice of the Montana Supreme Court
- Harold J. Warner (1890–1982), associate justice and chief justice of the Oregon Supreme Court
- Hiram B. Warner (1802–1881), associate justice of the Supreme Court of Georgia
