= Thomas Warner =

Thomas Warner may refer to:

- Sir Thomas Warner (explorer) (1580–1649), English explorer, and settler of St Kitts
- Sir Courtenay Warner, 1st Baronet (Thomas Courtenay Theydon Warner, 1857–1934), British politician
- Tom Warner (1948–2019), American politician
- Tom Warner (activist) (born 1952), Canadian gay rights activist
- Thomas Warner (poet) (born 1979), British poet
- Thomas Warner (bobsleigh) (1903–1965), British bobsledder
- Thomas Warner (cricketer) (1902–1987), South African cricketer
