= Jackie Warner (disambiguation) =

Jackie Warner (born 1968), is an American fitness trainer.

Jackie Warner may also refer to:

- Jackie Warner (baseball) (born 1943), baseball player

== See also ==
- Jack Warner (disambiguation)
- John Warner (disambiguation)
