= William Warner (Michigan politician, born 1812) =

American politician

Member of the Michigan House of Representatives from the Wayne County 1st district
- In office January 7, 1863 – December 31, 1864
- In office January 2, 1866 – December 31, 1867

Personal details
- Born: January 28, 1812 Pittsford, Vermont
- Died: July 1868 (aged 56)
- Party: Republican
- Education: Middlebury College

William Warner (January 28, 1812 – July 1868) was a Michigan politician.

== Early life and education ==
Warner was born in Pittsford, Vermont on January 28, 1812. Warner graduated from Middlebury College. Warner initially studied for the ministry, but abandoned this pursuit due to health considerations.

== Career ==
Warner served for several years as the treasurer of the University of Vermont. Warner was connected with the Vermont Central Railroad until 1855, when he arrived in Detroit. In 1860, Warner got involved with the lumber business until 1860, when he got involved with the Detroit Bridge and Iron Works. On November 4, 1862, Warner was elected to the Michigan House of Representatives, where he represented the Wayne County 1st district from January 7, 1863 to December 31, 1864. On November 6, 1866, Warner represented the same district again from January 2, 1866 to December 31, 1867.

== Death ==
Warner died in July 1868. At the time of his death, he was the president of Detroit Bridge and Iron Works.
