= Warner Hassells =

German painter

Warner Hassells (fl. 1680–1710) was a portrait painter active in England.

Hassells resided in London but was probably a native of Germany. He belonged to the school of Sir Godfrey Kneller, who painted his portrait in 1700. Hassells is known by a few portraits which have been engraved, including those of C. F. Fels (1690) and J. Witt (1701), a Frankfurt merchant, both in mezzotint by J. Smith, and an anonymous portrait in line by P. Vauderbank. He also painted miniatures and in watercolours. Hassells is wrongly described by Walpole as William Hassell. George Lambert is stated to have been his pupil.
