= Anouk Garnier =

French rope climber

Personal information
- Nationality: French
- Occupation(s): rope climber, fitness trainer, sports coach, mental strength coach, obstacle course racer

Sport
- Country: France
- Sport: obstacle course racing, rope climbing

Achievements and titles
- Personal best: 110m climb in rope climbing

Anouk Garnier is a French obstacle course runner, sports coach, fitness trainer and rope climber. She has specialized in obstacle course racing (OCR) for over a period of eight years. In April 2024, she became an overnight sensation after shattering the height record in climbing 110 m on a free hanging rope to reach the top of Eiffel Tower. She is the current record holder for the highest climb in rope climbing either by a male or a female.

== Career ==
During her career, Garnier has won over 25 international medals and is a two-time world champion in obstacle course racing in her age category. She was named as one of the ambassadors of the Paris 2024 volunteer program. She began rope climbing in 2022 in addition to her career in obstacle course racing. Garnier says she was inspired by the success of Denmark's Ida Mathilde Steensgaard, who had set the world record for the highest climb by a female by scaling to a distance of 26 metres at the Copenhagen Opera House in 2022. The record would later be broken by Anouk Garnier during her 110-metre climb at the Eiffel Tower.

She took part in the Eiffel Tower Monumental 100 rope climbing challenge which was held in April 2024 and it was organized in partnership with Société d'Exploitation de la Tour Eiffel (SETE). She achieved the feat of scaling up to the second floor of the Eiffel Tower on a free-hanging rope at the age of 34, and she scaled up to a distance of 110 meters with approximately 361 feet. She also consumed only 18 minutes to reach the second floor of the Eiffel Tower (110 m above the ground, 361 ft above the ground level) during her record-breaking achievement and she did with bare hands. She also eventually broke the previous world record held by South African Thomas Van Tonder, who had held the world record for climbing the highest distance when he climbed Soweto Towers, scaling up to 90 meters. Following her monumental achievement, she revealed that she practiced for over a year to successfully climb the Eiffel Tower. She embarked on a mission to climb Eiffer Tower as part of her Eiffel Tower challenge in order to raise much needed funds for charity named "League Against Cancer" in order to treat her mother who was suffering from cancer. French street artist Jo Di Bona who was also one of the ambassadors of the Paris 2024 volunteer program, created a fresco capturing the historic moment of Anouk's incredible achievement and notably Jo Di Bona did the unthinkable by finishing the fresco coinciding with Anouk's feat and it all happened within a space of 18 minutes.

Her record-breaking expedition to the Eiffel Tower powered the hopes for the staging of the 2024 Summer Olympics, which is slated to commence in France in July 2024. Her achievement was further acknowledged by the Olympic organizers when she was immediately named as a recipient to carry the iconic Olympic flame during the 2024 Summer Olympics opening ceremony.

She has also emphasized the importance of pursuing mental strength coaching through her Instagram handle.
