= Warner S. Rodimon =

Warner Scott Rodimon (September 17, 1907 – June 15, 2005) was a Rear Admiral in the United States Navy. A native of Northampton, Massachusetts, he graduated from the United States Naval Academy in 1929.

During World War II he commanded the USS Hopewell (DD-681). While in command he was awarded the Silver Star for his actions during the vessel's war patrol during the retaking of Corregidor. The citation states: The President of the United States of America takes pleasure in presenting the Silver Star to Captain [then Commander] Warner Scott Rodimon (NSN: 0-62586), United States Navy, for conspicuous gallantry and intrepidity as Commanding Officer of the U.S.S. HOPEWELL (DD-681), in action against enemy Japanese forces during the bombardment of Corregidor, Philippine Islands, on 14 February 1945. Attempting the rescue of survivors from a stricken vessel in the face of enemy shore fire, Captain Rodimon courageously engaged five enemy batteries and, by his aggressive action, succeeded in silencing several of the gun positions although his ship had been severely damaged. His determination, initiative and courageous devotion to duty were in keeping with the highest traditions of the United States Naval Service.
