= Edward Warner =

Edward Warner may refer to:

- Edward Warner (1511–1565), MP for Great Grimsby, Grantham and Norfolk
- Edward Warner (1818–1875), Lieutenant of the Tower of London, and MP for Norwich
- Edward Warner (VC) (1883–1915), English recipient of the Victoria Cross (VC)
- Edward Pearson Warner (1894-1958), American aviator
- Ed Warner (1889–1954), American baseball player
- Ed Warner (basketball) (1929–2002), American college basketball player
- Eddie Warner, see Movies for the Blind
