= Vernier (surname) =

Vernier is a French surname. Notable people with the surname include:

- Émile Louis Vernier (1829–1887), French painter
- Marie Vernier (fl. 1590–1627), French actress and theatre director
- Pierre Vernier (1580–1637), French mathematician and engineer
- Pierre Vernier (born 1931), French actor
