= Adrian Derbyshire =

British wheelchair fencer

Adrian Derbyshire (born 1 July 1974) is a former British international wheelchair fencer, ambassador for anti bullying, stigma and hate crime for the United Kingdom and CEO of The Adrian Derbyshire Foundation.

== Career ==
Derbyshire became a wheelchair user in 2008 following a brain hemorrhage. Doctors consequently discovered a rare brain tumor when attempting to treat the hemorrhage. Derbyshire is determined to raise disability awareness throughout the world, despite being in pain.

He was a member of the Great Britain Fencing Squad, and British National Wheelchair Sabre champion of 2010 and has won 2 gold and 3 silver domestic medals.

Derbyshire was a 2012 Olympic torch-bearer.

He retired from International competitions in 2013 following a shoulder injury which prevented him from competing in the London 2012 Paralympic games and a burglary in early 2013 in which most of his fencing equipment was stolen and his sports wheelchair was badly damaged.

Derbyshire has featured on several television shows promoting wheelchair fencing, including 'That Paralympic Show' and is featured in an ITV advertisement.

He is a supporter and promoter of disability rights and gay rights, and visits schools coaching children in fencing and talking about disabilities. Derbyshire is an ambassador for LGBT rights and Stop Hate UK.

== Awards ==
Derbyshire was awarded the Wire FM Adult Courage of the Year award, Warrington Disabled Sport's Personality of the Year and Cheshire Disabled Sport's Personality of the Year award.

During 2014 Derbyshire hand-pedalled his trike across the UK to promote awareness of hate crime, and was presented with a Points of Light award by Prime Minister David Cameron.

In 2016, he received and Honorary Fellowship from Myerscough College for his outstanding Sporting achievements and significant charitable work.
