= Rosalind and Helen =

Poem collection by Percy Bysshe Shelley

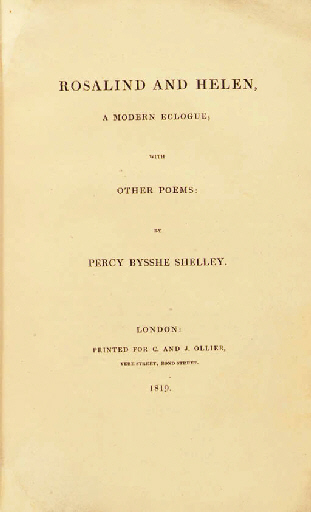
1819 title page. C. and J. Ollier, London.

Rosalind and Helen, A Modern Eclogue; With Other Poems is a poetry collection by Percy Bysshe Shelley published in 1819. The collection also contains the poems "Lines written on the Euganean Hills", "Hymn to Intellectual Beauty", and the sonnet "Ozymandias". The collection was published by Charles and James Ollier in London.

"Rosalind and Helen" is a narrative poem on the lives of two exiled English women, Rosalind and Helen, who meet by Lake Como, sharing their experiences of unfulfilled love, societal barriers, and political disillusionment. It is set within a background of incest and spectral figures, exploring themes of lost innocence, duty, and revolutionary and radical ideals.

Rosalind follows her duty and the norms of traditional society. She endures poverty and the loss of her children. Helen, on the other hand, her friend, has lived "not wisely but too well" with Lionel, a radical reformer. Shelley criticizes the rigid and unequal hierarchical structure of society and religious institutions, maintaining that redemption and salvation can be found through love and shared sympathy.

== Background ==
The poem was begun at Marlow, Buckinghamshire in the summer of 1817. Shelley sent a copy to the publisher in March, 1818, before leaving England. It was completed in August, 1818 at the Baths of Lucca in Italy and published in the spring of 1819.

The themes in the poem, such as marriage, political and religious reform, and incest, demonstrate similarities to Laon and Cythna or The Revolt of Islam, which Shelley was working on at the same time. The incest theme is also present in the 1818 edition of Frankenstein, but removed in the 1831 edition, which Shelley contributed to in 1816–1817. Victor Frankenstein marries his cousin Elizabeth. Shelley would return to the controversial incest theme in the 1819 play The Cenci.

Shelley uses the motif of "worms" as a poetic symbol or evocation of death in the work: "When he was in the church-yard lying/Among the worms. ... And the crawling worms were cradling her. ... [T]he dead ... Among their crawling worms."

Mary Shelley described the genesis of the poem and Shelley's theme of "Love" as "the law of life" and "the essence of our being": "Rosalind and Helen was begun at Marlow, and thrown aside, till I found it; and, at my request, it was completed. Shelley had no care for any of his poems that did not emanate from the depths of his mind, and develop some high or abstruse truth. When he does touch on human life and the human heart, no pictures can be more faithful, more delicate, more subtle, or more pathetic. He never mentioned Love, but he shed a grace, borrowed from his own nature, that scarcely any other poet has bestowed on that passion. When he spoke of it as the law of life, which inasmuch as we rebel against, we err and injure ourselves and others, he promulgated that which he considered an irrefragable truth. In his eyes it was the essence of our being, and all woe and pain arose from the war made against it by selfishness, or insensibility, or mistake. By reverting in his mind to this first principle, he discovered the source of many emotions, and could disclose the secrets of all hearts, and his delineations of passion and emotion touch the finest chords in our nature. Rosalind and Helen was finished during the summer of 1818, while we were at the Baths of Lucca."

== Plot summary ==
Rosalind and Helen are two exiled English women who meet at the shore of Lake Como in northern Italy. Helen is accompanied by her son Henry. They sit on "a stone seat beside a spring" in a wooded and secluded mountainous region to relate their experiences. First, a "speaker" relates a local legend about that spot: "This silent spot tradition old/Had peopled with the spectral dead." A "hellish" shape appears regularly at midnight who leads the ghost of a youth and sits beside him there. A naked child wanders by when "the fiend" turns into "a lady fair". This is due to "a monstrous curse" because of incest between a brother and a sister that was "solemnized" at that spot. The sister and her child were murdered there by a mob. The brother was burned alive in the market-place. This tale of intolerance foreshadows the stories that Rosalind and Helen relate.

Rosalind relates her story. She was living with her mother. Her father was absent. She established a relationship with a man whom she planned to marry. As they prepared to wed at the altar, her father appeared and informed them that the bridegroom was his son by another woman. He forbids the marriage. The bridegroom dies from the shock of the revelation. They would be committing incest. When the father dies, he leaves Rosalind and her mother with nothing. She is forced to marry a man she does not love in order to provide for herself and her mother. She has three children, all of whom loathe their father. The father dies. In his will, he stipulates that his wife shall not receive anything and that the children will be provided for as long as their mother separates from them. Rosalind decides to accept the terms rather than subject her children to poverty and want. She can no longer see her children.

Shelley seeks to show the role or plight of women under the traditional and conventional laws and customs of marriage. Rosalind is a pliant victim. She stoically follows those customs.

By contrast, Helen loves "not wisely but too well", rejecting the societal norms and traditions of marriage. She is in love with the upper-class Lionel, who is amiable and outgoing but who espouses radical and revolutionary ideas which seek to reform and change the system under which he lives. He is a thinly disguised characterization of Shelley himself. Rosalind looked askance at their relationship at that time and broke off her friendship with Helen.

Lionel attacks the social, political, and religious status quo of society. He makes speeches and issues pamphlets. Frustrated in reforming society imbued with "tyranny" and "superstition", he becomes an exile and wanderer, an outcast from society. He returns after three years and renews his relationship with Helen. His spirit is revived with new hope and vigor to renew the battle against the powers that be but his health begins to decline. Their relationship is unconventional and unorthodox.

Lionel is subsequently arrested on charges of blasphemy and seditious libel for his alleged attacks against religion and the government. He is sent to prison.

He is released "soon, but too late" from imprisonment. He takes a carriage from London to his residence in Wales. He is near death. He dies soon after.

Helen is traumatized by his death. She is cared for by Lionel's mother. During this time, Helen gives birth to a son. Lionel's mother dies during this period. Helen recovers. She discovers that Lionel had left her large sums of money and assets in his will. The "ready lies of law", however, prevent her from securing it. She brings legal action to obtain it.

Helen lives in a house with her son on the banks of Lake Como. Helen and Rosalind subsequently both live at this house.

Rosalind is reunited with her daughter. Her daughter and Helen's son live together and eventually establish a relationship and plan to wed. It is unclear, however, if they follow the traditional marriage vows as Rosalind did or whether they reject them as Lionel and Helen did.

Rosalind dies at an early age. Helen outlives her.

The final epithet posits an ambiguous and conjunctive posthumous transcendence: "And know, that if love die not in the dead/As in the living, none of mortal kind/Are blessed, as now Helen and Rosalind."

== Sources ==
- Chapin, Lisbeth. "Shelley's Great Chain of Being: From 'blind worms' to 'new-fledged eagles'." In Palmeri, Frank, ed, Humans and Other Animals in Eighteenth-Century British Culture: Representation, Hybridity, Ethics. Routledge: 2006.
- Donovan, Jack. "Shelley's Second Kingdom: Rosalind and Helen and 'Mazenghi" in The Neglected Shelley, edited by Alan M. Weinberger and Timothy Webb. Surrey, UK: Ashgate, 2015, pp. 137–156.
- Gladden, Samuel Lyndon. Shelley's Textual Seductions: Plotting Utopia in the Erotic and Political Works. London: Routledge, 2002.
- Forman, Harry Buxton. Rosalind and Helen: A Lecture. London: Printed for private circulation, 1888.
- Havens, Raymond D. "Rosalind and Helen", The Journal of English and Germanic Philology, Vol. 30, No. 2 (April, 1931), pp. 218–222.
- Ramya, C. "PB Shelley and Bharathidasan on the Miserable Lot of Women in Society: A Comparative Study." Language in India 19.12 (2019).
