= Warner Theatre =

Warner Theatre or Warner Theater may refer to:

== Australia ==
- Warner Theatre, Adelaide, built as Majestic Theatre in 1916, now demolished

== United Kingdom ==
- Vue West End in Leicester Square, London, from 1938 to 1981 known as The Warner Theatre

== United States ==
- Hollywood Pacific Theatre, formerly the Warner Hollywood Theatre, Los Angeles, California
- Mark Strand Theatre, later RKO Warner Twin Theatre, New York City
- Powers Auditorium, previously Warner Theatre, Youngstown, Ohio
- Warner Grand Theatre, an historic movie palace located in San Pedro, Los Angeles, California
- Warner Theater (West Chester, Pennsylvania)
- Warner Theatre (Atlantic City), 1929 venue reopened in 2023
- Warner Theatre (Erie, Pennsylvania)
- Warner Theatre (Morgantown, West Virginia)
- Warner Theatre (Torrington, Connecticut)
- Warner Theatre (Washington, D.C.)
