= Ross Warner =

Ross Warner may refer to:

- Ross Warner (rugby league) (1943–2020 ), Australian rugby league player for North Sydney
- Ross Warner (footballer) (born 1944), Australian rules footballer for Richmond
- Ross Warner (Neighbours), fictional character from Neighbours
