= Jack Warner (footballer, born 1883) =

English footballer

Personal information
- Full name: John Warner
- Date of birth: 1883
- Place of birth: Preston, England
- Date of death: 16 May 1948
- Place of death: Preston, England
- Height: 5 ft 10 in (1.78 m)
- Position: Full-back

Youth career
- St Michaels (Preston)

Senior career*
Years	Team	Apps	(Gls)
1902–1905	Preston North End	11	(0)
1905–1906	Southampton	17	(0)
1906–1915	Portsmouth	227	(10)
- * Club domestic league appearances and goals

John Warner (1883 – 16 May 1948) was an English professional footballer who played as a full-back in the years prior to World War I, spending most of his career with Portsmouth in the Southern League.

== Football career ==
Warner was born in Preston, Lancashire and trained as a bricklayer. He started his professional football career with Preston North End, then playing in the Football League Second Division, in September 1902. Over the next two seasons, he made eleven appearances, playing in either full-back position. In 1904, Preston were promoted to the First Division; once in the top division, Warner was unable to get past the established full-back pairing of Joe Derbyshire and Tommy Rodway and spent the entire 1904–05 season in the reserves.

In May 1905, he moved to the south coast to join Southampton of the Southern League. Warner was a "speedy" full-back, who was regarded "as more than a match for any forward". He could also use the ball well, but after 18 appearances, generally at left-back (where he competed with Arthur Hartshorne), the directors released him, under the mistaken impression that one of his knees was unsound.

In the summer of 1906 he moved down the Solent to join local rivals, Portsmouth. His 227 league appearances for the Fratton Park club proved that the Southampton directors had made a serious error. He remained as a player with Pompey right up to the suspension of football following the outbreak of war, and returned as a trainer, a position he held until after the Second World War.
