= SS Derbyshire =

1897 steamship of the Dominion Line

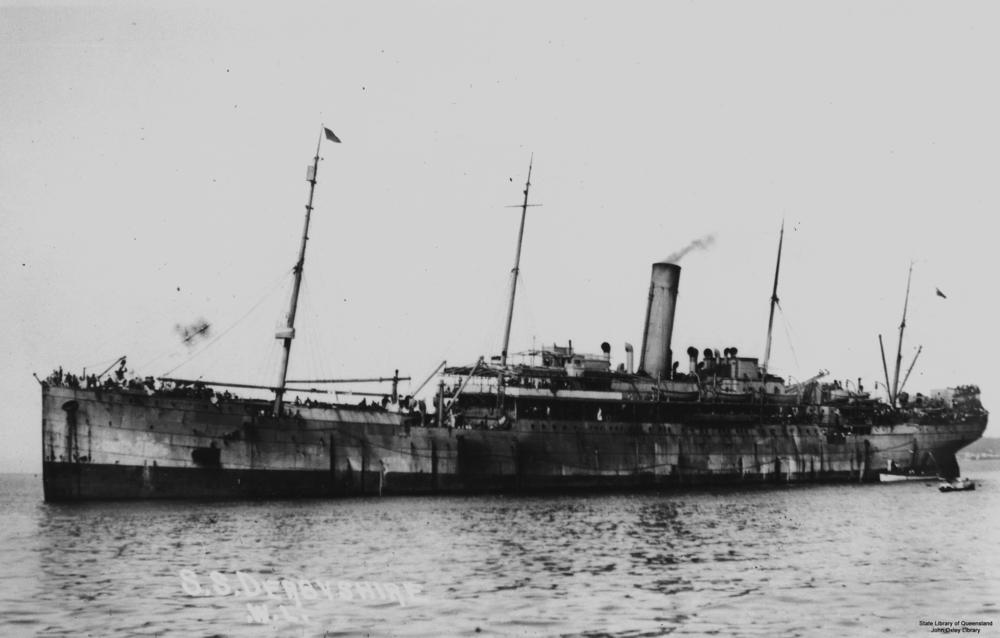

History
- Name: Derbyshire
- Builder: Harland and Wolff
- Yard number: 314
- Launched: 21 July 1897
- Completed: 8 October 1897
- Fate: Scrapped on 14 July 1931 at Japan

General characteristics
- Type: Steamship
- Tonnage: 6,635 GRT
- Depth: 30.5 ft (9.3 m)
- Propulsion: Triple expansion engine

SS Derbyshire (also known as HMT Derbyshire) was a passenger steamship built by Harland and Wolff in 1897 for the Bibby Line. She was assessed at 6,635 gross register tons and cost £130,000 (£18,631,416 in 2024). She operated as a one-class vessel, offering comfortable facilities for her passengers over the longer routes. During the First World War, the ship was requisitioned to serve as a troopship, and continued in that service into the 1920s.

== History ==
Constructed to be a sister of the SS Staffordshire, she was launched on 21 July 1897 and completed in the following October for the Bibby Line. The last of the shorter bridge deck type, her arrival enabled the service to Burma to have a sailing every three weeks in line with Henderson's. In 1899, she undertook four round voyages from Liverpool to Boston for the Dominion Line commencing on 6 June 1899.

When the SS Oxfordshire joined the fleet in 1912 she was reduced to being the reserve steamer. In January 1915, she was deployed as a troopship operating between India and Malaya and in 1917 had carried American troops to Europe. She became a full time troopship in 1921 when Bibby's were given a Government trooping contract and began carrying military personnel to India and the Levant. In 1927, she was replaced as a troopship by the SS Dorsetshire and was reduced to carrying cargo only. Operating as a coal burner, she was retired from service until being broken up at Japan on 14 July 1931.

== See also ==
- List of ships built by Harland and Wolff (1859–1929)
