= Karl Werner =

Karl Werner may refer to:

- Karl Werner (theologian) (1821–1888), Austrian theologian
- Karl Werner (footballer) (born 1966), German footballer
- Karl Werner (entomologist) (1956–2007), German entomologist

== See also ==
- Carl Werner (1808–1894), German watercolor painter
- Karl Verner (1846–1896), Danish linguist
