= Werner =

Werner may refer to:

== People ==
- Werner (name), origin of the name and people with this name as surname and given name

== Fictional characters ==
- Werner (comics), a German comic book character
- Werner Von Croy, a fictional character in the Tomb Raider series
- Werner von Strucker, a fictional character in the Marvel Comics universe

== Geography ==
- Werner, West Virginia
- Mount Werner, a mountain that includes the Steamboat Ski Resort, in the Park Range of Colorado
- Werner (crater), a crater in the south-central highlands of the Moon
- Werner projection, an equal-area map projection preserving distances along parallels, central meridian and from the North pole

== Companies ==
- Carsey-Werner, an American television and film production studio
- Werner Enterprises, a Nebraska-based trucking company
- Werner Co., a manufacturer of ladders
- Werner Motors, an early automobile manufacturer

== Other uses ==
- Werner (cycling team), a Spanish road-racing team 1969–1972
- Werner, an 1822 work by Lord Byron
- Werner Park, a baseball stadium near Omaha, Nebraska named for Werner Enterprises
- Werner state, a quantum state

== See also ==
- Wernher (disambiguation)
