= John Warner (scholar) =

English cleric and scholar (1736-1800)

John Warner (1736–1800) was an English cleric and classical scholar.

== Life ==
Son of Ferdinando Warner and born in London in 1736, he was admitted to St Paul's School on 30 March 1747. Going on to Magdalene College, Cambridge in 1754, then shortly moving to Trinity College, he graduated B.A. in 1758, M.A. in 1761, and D.D. in 1773.Trinity College, Cambridge,

For many years Warner was popular as a preacher at a chapel, his private property, in Long Acre, London. He was instituted in 1771 to the united rectories of Hockcliffe and Chalgrave, Bedfordshire. These were vacant since the incumbent William Dodd had been executed for forgery. He was later presented by his friend Sir Richard Colt Hoare to the rectory of Stourton, Wiltshire.

In 1778 Warner was living as a gentleman of leisure, with rooms in Barnard's Inn, and had formed a connection with George Augustus Selwyn. In August that year he was travelling in Italy. At the beginning of 1779 he was in Paris, where he knew the Abbé Raynal.

In 1790 Warner went to Paris as chaplain to the English ambassador, and there absorbed revolutionary ideas. Warner knew both William Hayley and Joel Barlow: Hayley was keen that Warner should introduce them. Barlow visited Hayley at Eartham with Warner in 1792, encountering also James Stanier Clarke. Warner stayed on after the embassy of Earl Gower was closed. Becoming involved in French politics, he was once proposed for citizenship, with six others; but was detained in 1793 as he tried to leave the country, living for a time outside Boulogne before being allowed to depart in 1794.

Warner was an admirer of John Howard the prison reformer, and it was mainly his efforts that had the statue to Howard in St Paul's Cathedral erected. He died in St John's Square, Clerkenwell, on 22 January 1800.

== Works ==
Warner was the author of Metronariston; or a New Pleasure recommended, in a Dissertation upon a part of Greek and Latin Prosody (anon.), London, 1797. Some of his letters were printed in John Heneage Jesse's George Selwyn and his Contemporaries (1844, iii. 306–18).

== Notes ==
Attribution

This article incorporates text from a publication now in the public domain: Lee, Sidney, ed. (1899). "Warner, John (1736-1800)". Dictionary of National Biography. Vol. 59. London: Smith, Elder & Co.
