= Frank B. Warner =

Missouri politician

Member of the Missouri Senate from the 29th district
- In office Elected 1912 – ?

Personal details
- Born: February 5, 1863 St. Louis, Missouri
- Died: November 15, 1944 (aged 81) St. Louis, Missouri
- Party: Republican
- Occupation: Jewelry businessman

Frank B. Warner (November 5, 1863 – February 15, 1944) was an American politician who served in the Missouri Senate and the Missouri House of Representatives. He was educated in the St. Louis area public schools. Warner did not make a floor speech in the legislature until he had surpassed 22 years of service, and then spoke for only a minute. He introduced only one bill, due to his belief that law books were already overburdened with laws.
