= Amos Griswold Warner =

American social worker

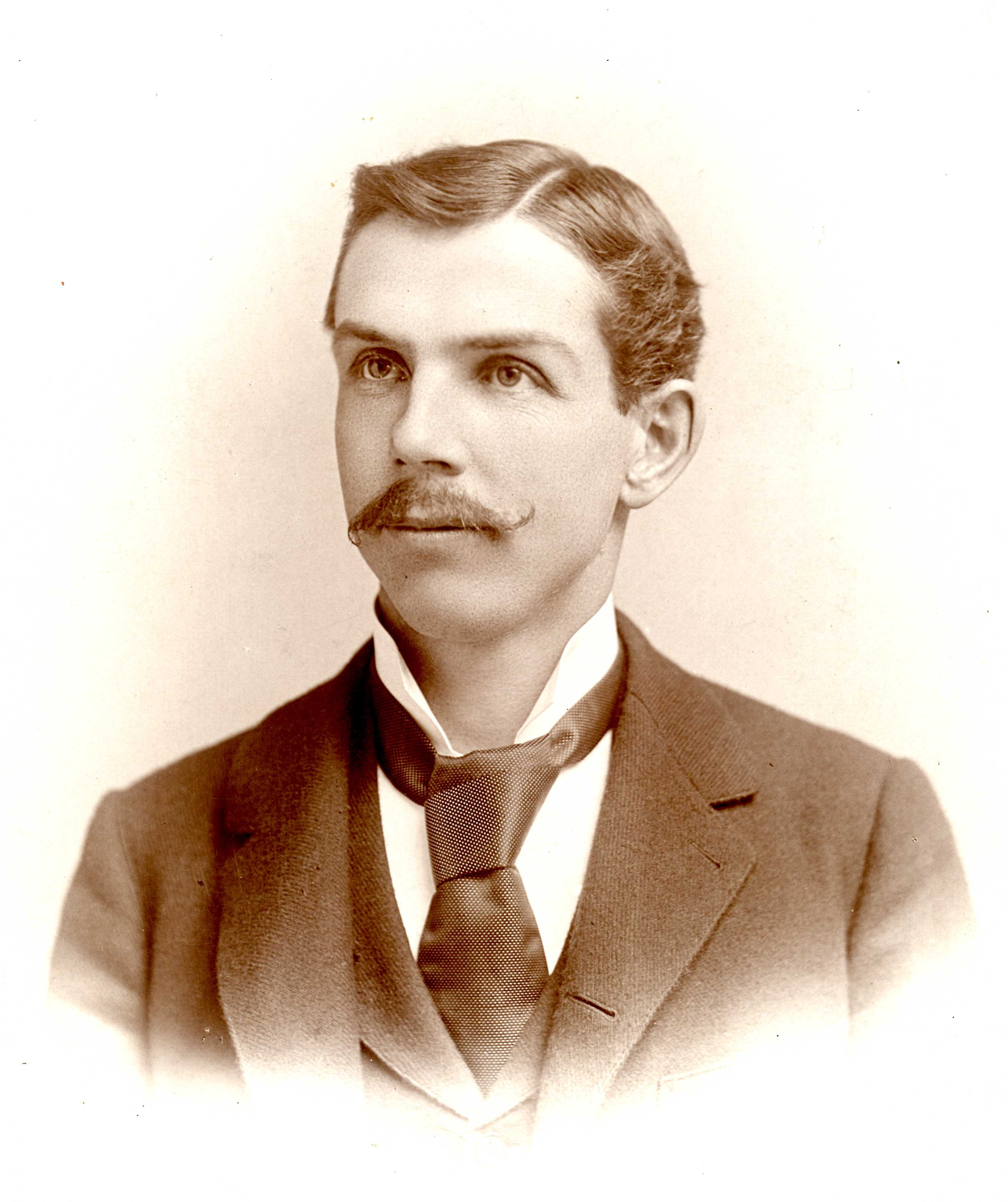
In 1893

Amos Griswold Warner (December 21, 1861 – January 17, 1900), was an American social worker. While a graduate student of economics at Johns Hopkins University, he became a general agent of the Charity Society of Baltimore in 1887. Among his many influential acts during this time, Warner developed a system for the statistical analysis of social cases. Going against the majority view of his day, Amos Griswald Warner suggested that the misfortune of a man could not be traced to a singular origin; moreover, the causes of misfortune were often a result of factors entirely outside the control of the individual (including environment, economy, education, or social culture). Suggesting that poverty could be overcome only by targeting the source of misfortune, he created a system of prioritization in which a weighted score is assigned to objective and/or subjective (as he classified them) categories made up of various sources of personal hardship. In his opinion, poverty could not be fought solely through the distribution of charitable funds- rather learning to target the sources of poverty offers the only viable permanent solution. In his book he states, "Nearly all the experiences in this country indicate" that welfare "is a source of corruption to politics, of expense to the community, and of degradation and increased pauperization to the poor.... The more generous public relief, the more likely the poor will prefer it to working."

Warner moved to the District of Columbia in 1891 and became the first superintendent of charities for the District. His book, American Charities. A Study in Philanthropy and Economics (ISBN 0-543-91081-4) was published in 1894 and became a standard textbook on the subject.
