= Joe Derbyshire =

English footballer

Personal information
- Full name: Joseph Derbyshire
- Date of birth: 11 July 1883
- Place of birth: Harwood, England
- Date of death: 1949 (aged 65–66)
- Position: Full back

Senior career*
Years	Team	Apps	(Gls)
1901–1902	Darwen		
1902–1909	Preston North End	126	(8)
1909–1910	Rossendale United		
1910–1911	Darwen		
1911	Great Harwood		
Total		126	(8)
- * Club domestic league appearances and goals

Joseph Derbyshire (11 July 1883 – 1946) was an English footballer who played in the Football League for Preston North End.
