= Werner Hüllen =

German lexicographer (1927–2008)

Werner Hüllen (17 October 1927 – 13 April 2008) was a German lexicographer.

== Life ==
He was born on 17 October 1927.

He died on 13 April 2008.

== Career ==
He received his PhD from the University of Cologne.

He then worked as a grammar school teacher.

He finally became an applied linguist at the universities of Trier and Essen.

== Bibliography ==
Some of his books are:

- English And American Poetry
- A History of Roget's Thesaurus: Origins, Development, and Design
- Networks and Knowledge in Roget's Thesaurus
- English Dictionaries 800-1700
- Understanding the Lexicon: Meaning, Sense and World Knowledge in Lexical Semantics
- Understanding Bilingualism
- Collected papers on the history of linguistics ideas
