= Guernier =

Guernier is a French surname. Notable people with the surname include:

- Charles Guernier (1870–1943), French politician
- Louis Du Guernier (1677–1716), French engraver

== See also ==
- Guerrier
