= Warner (writer) =

Warner or Garnier (fl. 1106), was an English writer of homilies, and a monk of Westminster.

He was present at the translation of the relics of St. Withburga, 1106. He is called 'homeliarius,' and dedicated a volume of homilies to his abbot, Gilbert Crispin. This work is lost. His writings have sometimes been confused with those of the celebrated Werner Rolewinck, who wrote in the fourteenth century.
