= Wings of Freedom Flitplane =

American ultralight airplane

Flitplane

General information
- Type: Ultralight aircraft
- National origin: United States
- Manufacturer: Wings of Freedom
- Designer: Ed Fisher
- Status: Production ended (2019)
- Number built: 50 (Dec 2011)

History
- Introduction date: 1995
- First flight: 1995

The Wings of Freedom Flitplane is an American single-seat, high-wing, single-engine ultralight aircraft that is available as a kit aircraft or as plans for amateur construction from Wings of Freedom of Hubbard, Ohio.

The Flitplane was designed as a low-cost aircraft with the look of an antique aircraft design for the US FAR 103 Ultralight Vehicles category with its maximum 254 lb (115 kg) empty weight requirement.

In late 2019 the company website had been taken down and it is likely that production had ended.

== Development ==
The Flitplane was designed in 1995 by Ed Fisher who also designed the Skylite ultralight and the Micro-Mong home-built aircraft. The design was acquired by Joe Naylor and Mark W. Klotz who formed Wings of Freedom Aviation Inc. in 1996 to develop the design and market it.

Naylor and Klotz made many changes to the design but retained the antique look of the aircraft and its distinctive large triangular windshield.

The Flitplane's fuselage is fabricated from a welded truss of 4130 steel tubing. The 27 ft (8.2 m) wings are of aluminum "ladder-type" construction, are strut-braced and utilize jury struts. The fuel tank is integrated into the wing centre-section. The wings and tail are covered in doped aircraft fabric. The engine is mounted in front of the high wing, above the cockpit. The original powerplant was a 35 hp (26 kW) Cuyuna 460 engine, with a 40 hp (30 kW) Rotax 447 optional. Later engine options added included the 28 hp (21 kW) Hirth F-33, the 45 hp (34 kW) Zanzottera MZ 201 and the Kawasaki 440 40 hp (30 kW) engine.

The conventional landing gear is suspended using fibreglass axles. The tailwheel is steerable. The controls are conventional three-axis and include full-span ailerons. The large, flat-plate triangular windshield protects the pilot from the propeller blast and has distinctive cut-outs for the rudder pedals.

The Flitplane is available as plans, a complete kit, partial kits or as a finished and ready-to-fly aircraft. The company claims that the aircraft can be built from the kit in 100 hours or 500 hours from plans.

== Specifications (Flitplane) ==
Data from Company website

General characteristics

- Crew: one
- Capacity: 360 lbs (163 kg) useful load, no passengers
- Length: 15 ft 9 in (4.80 m)
- Wingspan: 27 ft 0 in (8.24 m)
- Wing area: 145 sq ft (13.49 m^{2})
- Empty weight: 240 lb (109 kg)
- Max takeoff weight: 600 lb (272 kg)
- Powerplant: 1 × Hirth F-33 two-stroke, dual capacitor discharge ignition single-cylinder engine with 2.5:1 reduction belt drive, 28 hp (21 kW)
- Propellers: 5 ft 4 in (1.62 m) diameter

Performance

- Cruise speed: 63 mph (102 km/h, 55 kn)
- Stall speed: 34 mph (55 km/h, 30 kn)
- Never exceed speed: 70 mph (113 km/h, 61 kn)
- Rate of climb: 600 ft/min (3.05 m/s)
- Wing loading: 3.4 lb/sq ft (20.16 kg/m^{2})
- Power/mass: 14.3 lb/hp (0.077 kW/kg)

== See also ==
Aircraft of comparable role, configuration, and era

- Aero-Works Aerolite 103
- Ameri-Cana Eureka
- Avid Champion
- Beaujon Mach .07
- Beaujon Enduro
- Birdman WT-11 Chinook
- Chotia Gypsy
- Fisher Avenger
- Flightstar
- Hummel Bird
- ISON Airbike
- Skystar Kitfox Lite
- Spectrum RX-28 Beaver
