= Adams CA-2 =

CA-2

General information
- Type: Ultralight aircraft
- National origin: United States
- Manufacturer: Corning Aircraft; Hummel Aviation; Adams Aeronautics Company
- Designer: Frank Griffith
- Status: Plans available
- Number built: 45 (as of 2011)

History
- Introduction date: 1993
- First flight: c. 1992

The Adams CA-2 is a single seat, low-wing, American ultralight aircraft that was designed by Frank Griffith of Corning Aircraft around 1992 and was available as plans for amateur construction until 1999. In 1999, Hummel Aviation of Bryan, Ohio began offering the design. Although the design was well received, plans were no longer listed as being available from Hummel Aviation as of 2007.

In 2011, Adams Aeronautics Company of Dallas, Georgia, took over sales and support of the CA-2 design.

== Development ==
The design goals of the CA-2 described a plans-built aircraft for the US FAR 103 Ultralight Vehicles category, including a maximum 254 lb (115 kg) empty weight. The CA-2 was also intended to be one of the lowest cost ways of obtaining an ultralight aircraft. These goals were met and the resulting aircraft has an empty weight of 250 lb (113 kg), when equipped with a 28 hp (21 kW) Rotax 277 engine. At the time it entered the market, the airframe construction cost was estimated to be US$1600 and the total completion cost US$5000–6000. The price for the plans, consisting of 40 sheets of 11"X17" (28 X 43 cm), was US$150 in 2011.

The CA-2 requires about 600 hours to build. The airframe is of all-metal construction using 2024-T3 aluminium sheet, extruded angles and tubing, fastened primarily with stainless steel pop rivets. Construction requires normal hand tools, plus a small bending brake and a tube bender.

The fuselage and wings are of monocoque stressed skin construction. The wings include plain flaps and differential ailerons and are stressed to +4.4 and -2.2 g. The wings are removable by withdrawing three bolts. The control surfaces are made from aluminium tubing, are fabric covered and actuated by pushrods.

The landing gear is of conventional configuration with a steerable tailwheel linked to the rudder.

The prototype was powered by a Rotax 277. Heavier engines can be installed, although the aircraft will not then meet the US FAR 103 weight requirements as an ultralight aircraft. Other engines used include the 40 hp (30 kW) Rotax 447, 35 hp (26 kW) Rotax 377, 30 hp (22 kW) 1/2 VW and the 22 hp (16 kW) Hirth F-33.

== Specifications (CA-2) ==
Data from Cliche, Kitplanes & Aerocrafter

General characteristics

- Crew: one
- Capacity: 270 lbs (122 kg) useful load, no passengers
- Length: 16 ft 6 in (5.03 m)
- Wingspan: 26 ft 0 in (7.93 m)
- Wing area: 117 sq ft (10.9 m^{2})
- Empty weight: 250 lb (113 kg)
- Max takeoff weight: 520 lb (235 kg)
- Powerplant: 1 × Rotax 277 , 28 hp (21 kW)

Performance

- Maximum speed: 63 mph (102 km/h, 55 kn)
- Cruise speed: 50 mph (81 km/h, 43 kn)
- Stall speed: 26 mph (42 km/h, 23 kn)
- Never exceed speed: 80 mph (130 km/h, 70 kn)
- Range: 125 mi (203 km, 109 nmi)
- Service ceiling: 10,000 ft (3,050 m)
- Rate of climb: 600 ft/min (3.05 m/s)
- Wing loading: 4.4 lb/sq ft (21.6 kg/m^{2})
- Power/mass: 18.6 lb/hp (0.09 kW/kg)

== See also ==
Aircraft of comparable role, configuration, and era

- Aero-Works Aerolite 103
- Affordaplane
- Airdrome Eindecker E-III
- Ameri-Cana Eureka
- Beaujon Mach .07
- Beaujon Enduro
- Birdman WT-11 Chinook
- Fisher Avenger
- Fisher FP-303
- Hummel Bird
- ISON Airbike
- Mini-MAX
- Spectrum RX-28 Beaver
