= Chotia Gypsy =

American ultralight aircraft

General information
- Type: Ultralight aircraft
- National origin: United States
- Manufacturer: Vintage Ultralight and Lightplane Association
- Designer: John Chotia
- Status: Plans available

History
- Introduction date: 1980
- First flight: 1980
- Developed from: Chotia Woodhopper

The Chotia Gypsy is an American single engine, high-wing, conventional landing gear-equipped ultralight aircraft that was designed by John Chotia in 1980.

The Gypsy design was also produced as a kit plane in the early 2000s by Endeavor Aircraft & Automation as the Explorer. Even though kits are no longer available the Vintage Ultralight and Lightplane Association still offers plans for the design.

== Development ==
Designer John Chotia created the Gypsy in 1980 as a development of the Chotia Woodhopper. The Woodhopper was itself a development of the Chotia Weedhopper. The Gypsy was intended as an easier design for amateur builders to construct than the Woodhopper, with its all-wood construction. The Gypsy features bolted aluminum tube construction, a wire-braced wing with a span of 32 ft (9.8 m), with the ground wires supported by a kingpost. The wing is of aluminum tube construction, with foam ribs and a covering of doped aircraft fabric. The design has a standard empty weight of 165 lb (75 kg) easily allowing it to qualify for the US FAR 103 Ultralight Vehicles category, with its maximum 254 lb (115 kg) empty weight requirement. The initial engine was a two stroke powerplant of 25 hp (19 kW) and the recommended power range is 20 to 25 hp (15 to 19 kW). The engine is mounted on the overhead keel tube in tractor configuration.

Unlike the open-air pilot seat of the Woodhopper, the Gypsy design places the pilot in a cockpit bathtub pod with a windshield that provides wind protection. The main landing gear has no suspension and the tailwheel is attached to, and steered by, the rudder directly. The controls are conventional three-axis.

The Gypsy was put into production in 2000 as a kit aircraft by Endeavor Aircraft & Automation of Paw Paw, Michigan at a price of US$6,900 for a complete kit. Production was completed in the mid-2000s and the kit is no longer available. Endeavor specified the 26 hp (19 kW) Rotax 277 as the standard engine and recommended a power range of 26 to 42 hp (19 to 31 kW). The kit version has a higher empty weight of 250 lb (113 kg).

== Variants ==
Chotia Gypsy
1980 version, plans still available.
Endeavor Explorer
Kit version, production commenced in 2000, out of production.

== Specifications (Explorer) ==
Data from Cliche

General characteristics

- Crew: one
- Capacity: 250 lb (113 kg) useful load, no passengers
- Length: 17 ft 0 in (5.19 m)
- Wingspan: 32 ft 0 in (9.76 m)
- Wing area: 144 sq ft (13.40 m^{2})
- Empty weight: 250 lb (113 kg)
- Max takeoff weight: 500 lb (226 kg)
- Powerplant: × Rotax 277 two stroke, single cylinder, 26 hp (19 kW)

Performance

- Maximum speed: 55 mph (89 km/h, 48 kn)
- Cruise speed: 35 mph (57 km/h, 30 kn)
- Stall speed: 22 mph (36 km/h, 19 kn)
- Range: 75 mi (122 km, 65 nmi)
- Rate of climb: 500 ft/min (2.54 m/s)
- Wing loading: 3.47 lb/sq ft (16.87 kg/m^{2})
- Power/mass: 19.23 lb/hp (0.084 kW/kg)

== See also ==
Aircraft of comparable role, configuration, and era

- Aero-Works Aerolite 103
- Airdrome Eindecker E-III
- Ameri-Cana Eureka
- Avid Champion
- Beaujon Mach .07
- Beaujon Enduro
- Birdman WT-11 Chinook
- Fisher Avenger
- Hummel Bird
- ISON Airbike
- Skystar Kitfox Lite
- Spectrum RX-28 Beaver
