= Aeroplanes DAR =

Privately owned Bulgarian aircraft manufacturer

Aeroplanes DAR Ltd
- Company type: Privately held company
- Industry: Aerospace
- Founded: 1995
- Headquarters: Sofia, Bulgaria
- Key people: CEO: Tony Ilieff
- Products: Kit aircraft
- Website: www.aeroplanesdar.com

Aeroplanes DAR Ltd ("Аероплани ДАР" ЕООД - DAR aeroplanes EOOD) is a privately owned Bulgarian aircraft manufacturer based in Sofia, established in 1995.

The company produces ultralight aircraft. The company name commemorates the defunct Bulgarian aircraft manufacturer Darzhavna Aeroplanna Rabotilnitsa (DAR) of Bojourishte (DAR aircraft were also produced by the former Darzhavna Samoletna Fabrika in Lovech), but otherwise there is no connection between the companies.

The DAR 21 Vector II was launched in 2000, winning a best product award for 2000 in Bulgaria. Other models produced include the DAR 21S, DAR-23, DAR Speedster and the DAR Solo. The DAR Solo entered production in 2008. It is a single-seat design for the U.S. FAR 103 Ultralight Vehicles rules, with a carbon fibre airframe and aluminium alloy wings, powered by a 27 hp Czech F-200 or 28 hp Hirth F-33.

Tony Ilieff is the company CEO.

== Products ==
- DAR 21 Vector II
- DAR 21S
- DAR-23
- DAR 25 Impuls
- DAR Speedster
- DAR Solo
