= Wings of Freedom =

American aircraft manufacturer

Wings Of Freedom, Inc.
- Company type: Privately held company
- Industry: Aerospace
- Defunct: 2019
- Headquarters: Hubbard, Ohio, United States
- Products: Kit aircraft Ultralight aircraft
- Website: www.wingsoffreedomaviation.com

for the 2016 video game see A.O.T.: Wings of Freedom

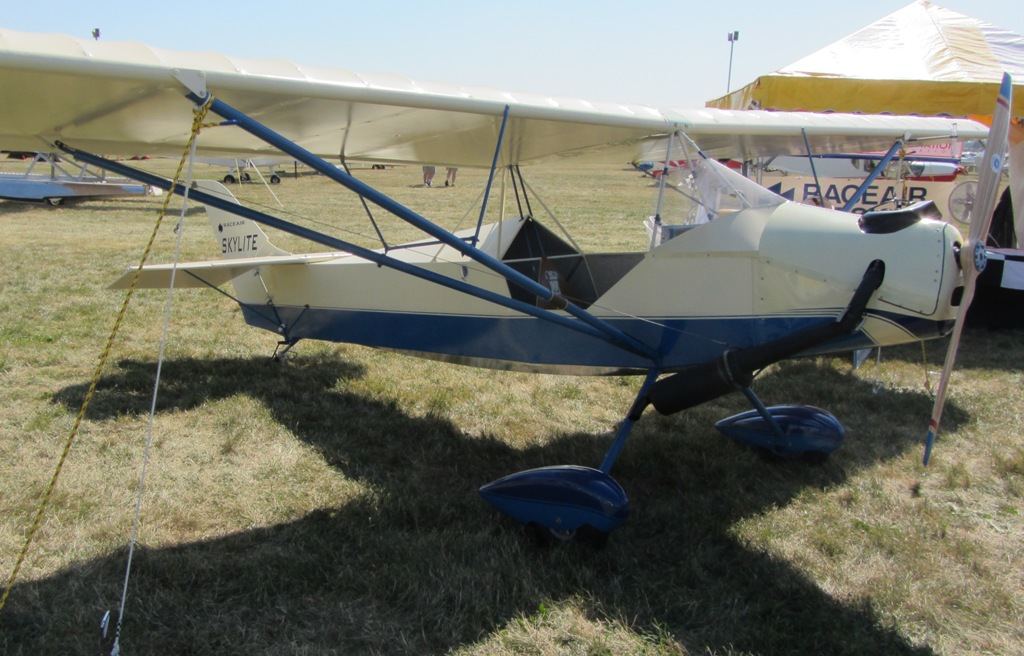
Wings of Freedom Skylite

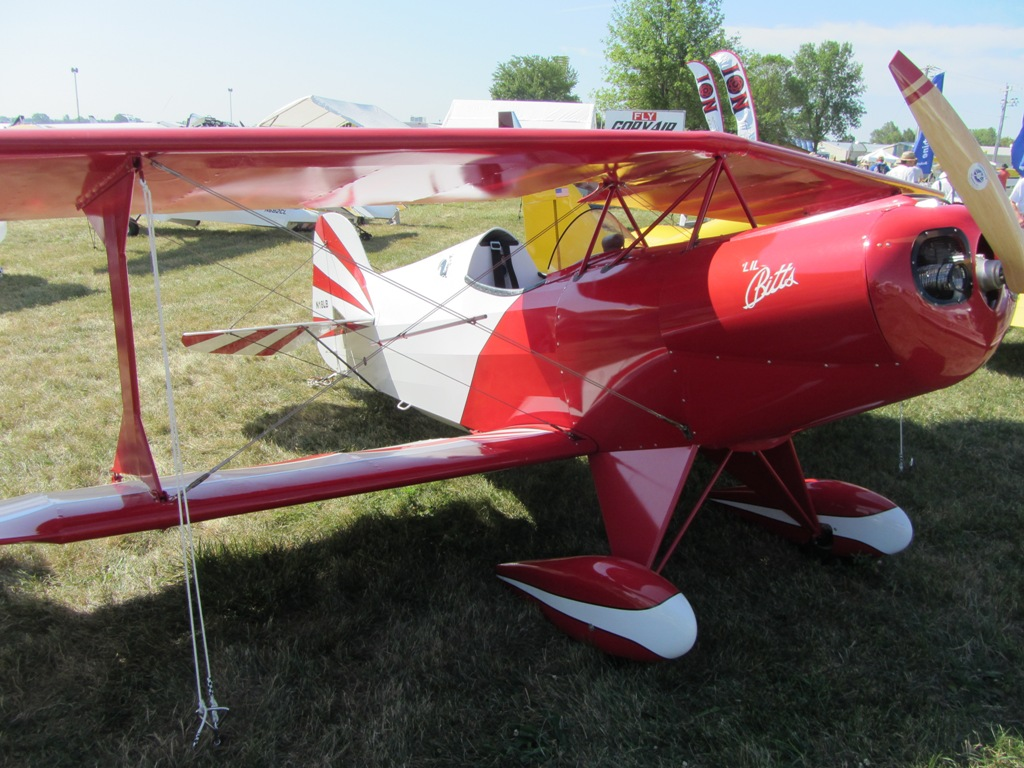
Wings of Freedom LiL Bitts

Wings Of Freedom, Inc. was an American aircraft manufacturer based in Hubbard, Ohio. The company was previously located in Middlefield, Ohio. The company specialized in the design and manufacture of ultralight aircraft in the form of plans and kits for amateur construction.

In late 2019 the company website had been taken down and it is likely that the company has closed.

The company's line included two Raceair Designs aircraft designs, the Raceair Skylite and Raceair Lil Bitts, plus the Wings of Freedom Phoenix 103, which is based upon the discontinued Aero-Works Aerolite 103, for which Wings of Freedom has been providing parts. The Wings of Freedom Flitplane is an original design, intended to be simple and inexpensive to build and fly.

The origin of the company name is explained, "the name 'Wings of Freedom' is derived from the feeling that every pilot has experienced when he or she has taken to the air. (Freedom)".

== Aircraft ==
Summary of aircraft built by Wings Of Freedom
Model name	First flight	Number built	Type
Wings of Freedom Flitplane	1995	50 (Dec 2011)	single seat ultralight aircraft
Wings of Freedom Phoenix 103		10 (Dec 2011)	single seat ultralight aircraft
Wings of Freedom Skylite	1991	26 (1998)	single seat ultralight aircraft
Wings of Freedom LiL Bitts			single seat biplane
