= F33 =

F33 may refer to:

- HMS Somali (F33), a 1937 British Royal Navy Tribal-class destroyer
- Recurrent depressive disorder ICD-10 code
- Hirth F-33, an aircraft engine
- F-33, Another name for the KF-21
