= Skycruiser =

Skycruiser may refer to:

- Bautek Skycruiser, a German ultralight trike design
- SkyCruiser Autogyro SkyCruiser, a Hungarian autogyro design
