= VA115 =

VA115 or VA-115 may refer to:

- Attack Squadron 115 (U.S. Navy)
- Rotorschmiede VA115, a German helicopter design
- State Route 115 (Virginia)
