= SkyCraft Airplanes =

Defunct airplane manufacturer

- Type: Private company
- Industry: General aviation
- Founded: 2012
- Founder: Tyler Ives; Christopher Gong; Paul Glavin
- Fate: out of business
- Headquarters: Orem, Utah
- Products: Light sport aircraft
- Website: www.skycraftairplanes.com

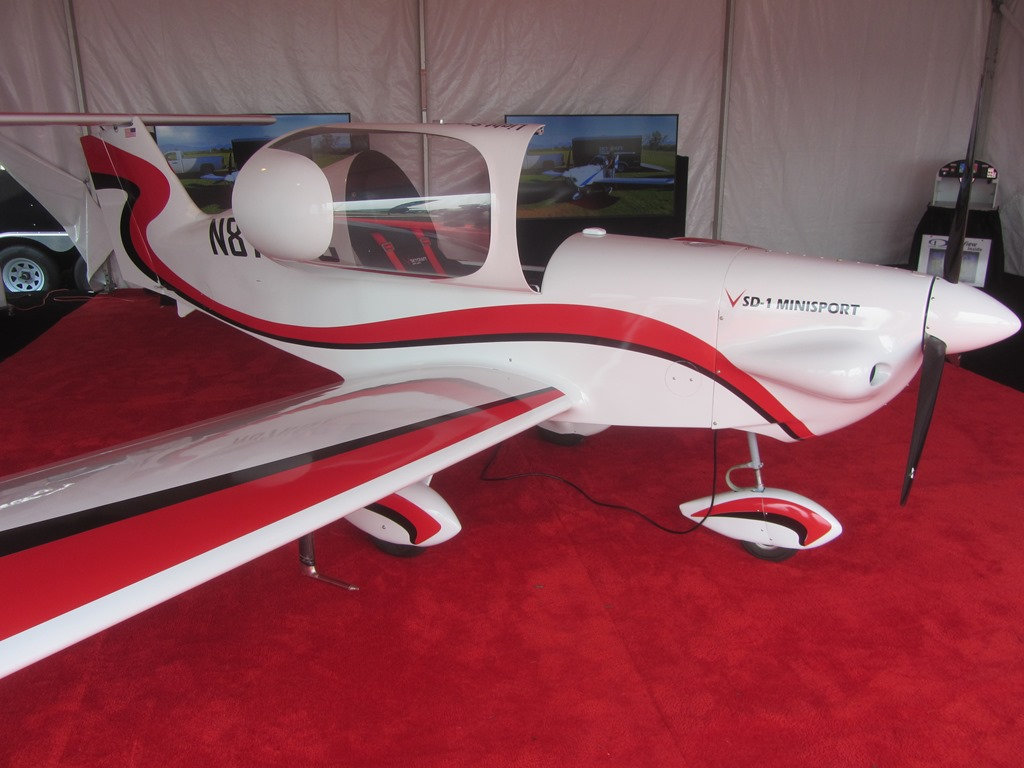
SkyCraft SD-1 Minisport

SkyCraft Airplanes was a light sport aircraft manufacturing company based in Orem, Utah. The company only built one product, the SkyCraft SD-1 Minisport, a single-seat low-wing plane designed in the Czech Republic.

The company debuted the aircraft at 2013 EAA Airventure Oshkosh as a ready-to-fly, S-LSA Certified aircraft. Production of the aircraft began two months prior in May 2013 and was intended to have a revised cockpit, including Dynon SkyView instrumentation.

At the end of May 2014 Skycraft announced that light-sport flight testing had been completed. However, as of 7 August 2017 the SD-1 was still not on the Federal Aviation Administration's list of accepted light-sport aircraft and by the end of 2017 the company had gone out of businesses.

== Aircraft ==
- SkyCraft SD-1 Minisport
