= Spacek SD-1 Minisport =

Czech ultralight aircraft design

SD-1 Minisport
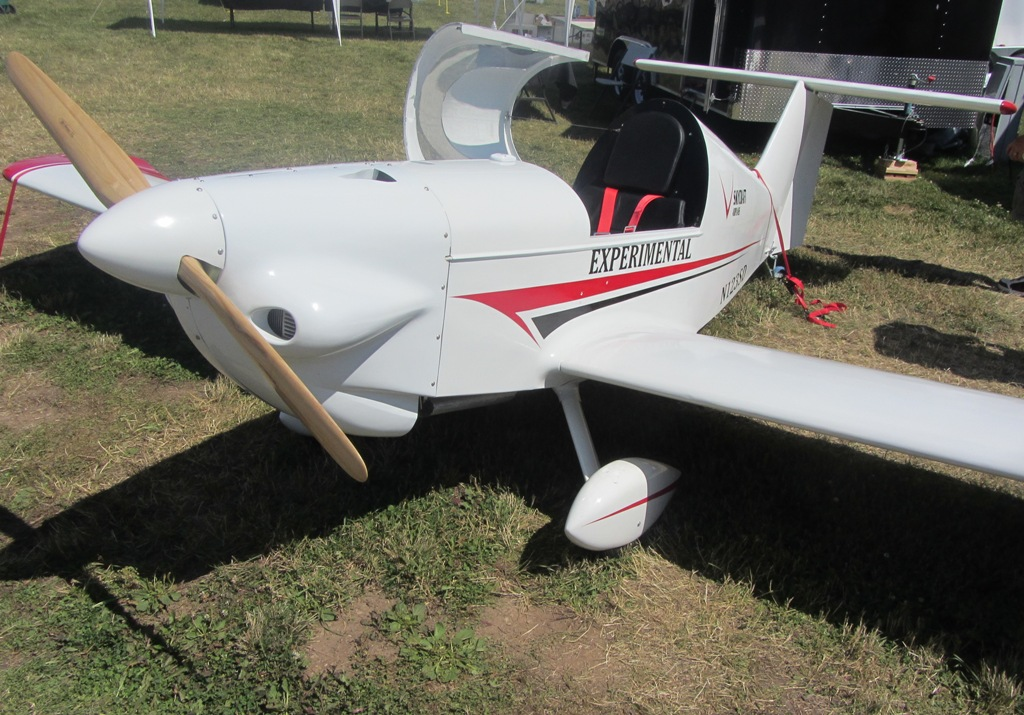

General information
- Type: Amateur-built aircraft
- National origin: Czech Republic
- Manufacturer: Spacek; SkyCraft Airplanes
- Designer: Igor Špaček
- Status: Plans and kits available (2016)
- Number built: about 41 flying by November 2015

The Spacek SD-1 Minisport is a Czech amateur-built aircraft, designed by Igor Špaček and produced by Spacek of Hodonín. The aircraft was also produced for a short time in the United States by SkyCraft Airplanes of Orem, Utah as a light-sport aircraft, but they had gone out of businesses by 2017. The aircraft is supplied in the form of plans, as a kit for amateur construction, or as a ready-to-fly aircraft.

== Design and development ==
The aircraft features a cantilever low-wing, a single-seat enclosed cockpit, fixed conventional landing gear or optionally tricycle landing gear, a T-tail and a single engine in tractor configuration. Due to its very light weight it can qualify for the German 120 kg category. It complies with the United Kingdom SSDR rules for single seat deregulated microlight aeroplanes.

The aircraft is made from wood, with judicious use of composites, including for the wing spar. Its 6 m (19.7 ft) span wing employs an A315 airfoil, has an area of 6 m^{2} (65 sq ft) and utilizes flaperons. Engines of 24 to 50 hp (18 to 37 kW) can be used. Standard engines tested are the 28 hp (21 kW) Hirth F33, the 50 hp (37 kW) Hirth F23 two-strokes, the 24 hp (18 kW) or 33 hp (25 kW) Briggs & Stratton Vanguard (designated SE24), or the Verner JCV-360 powerplants. The Rotax 447, Hirth 2702, Zanzottera MZ 201, Simonini Victor 1 Super, 2si 460 and Half VW can also be used.

By November 2015 113 had been sold worldwide and about 41 were flying.

At the end of May 2014 SkyCraft Airplanes announced that light-sport flight testing on its version had been completed. Their model has a revised cockpit, including Dynon SkyView instrumentation, a hydraulic brake system and the 50 hp (37 kW) Hirth F-23 two-stroke fuel-injected engine. The company's intention was that 12 aircraft would be built for the first production run. However, as of 7 August 2017 the SD-1 was still not on the Federal Aviation Administration's list of accepted light-sport aircraft.

== Variants ==
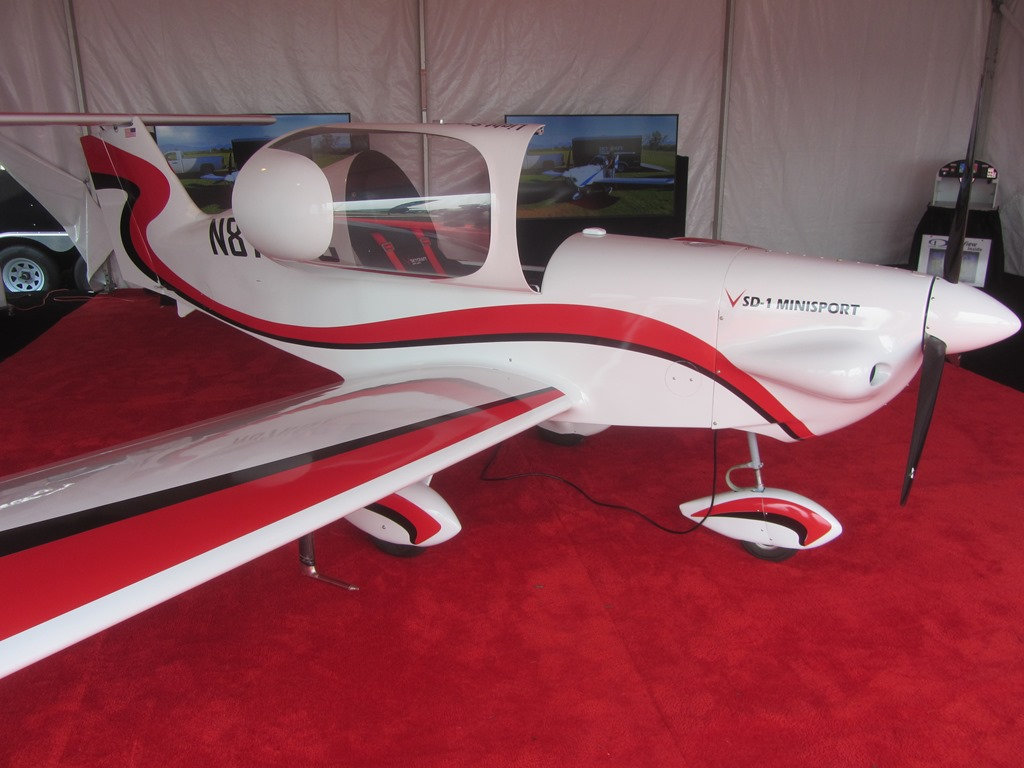
SkyCraft Airplanes SD-1 Minisport

SD-1 TD
Conventional landing gear (taildragger) version
SD-1 TG
Tricycle gear version
SD-1 TD XL
Conventional landing gear (taildragger) version for taller pilots
SD-1 TG XL
Tricycle gear version for taller pilots
SD-2 SportMaster
2-seat tricycle gear version

== Accidents ==
- In September 2013, during a test and evaluation flight of the sole example flying in the United States, the pilot lost control while flying aerobatics not approved for the aircraft type and the aircraft crashed. The ballistic parachute did not deploy properly, most likely due to be out of limits for deployment, and the pilot was killed.
- In August 2018, near Nannhausen in Germany, an SD1 crashed after engine problems during climb-out after take-off. The pilot did not survive.
- In June 2021, a loss of control accident happened in Butler, Ohio. The pilot failed to maintain adequate airspeed following a partial loss of engine power during take-off, which resulted in an aerodynamic stall. The pilot survived.

== Specifications (SD-1) ==
Data from Bayerl and Spacek sro

General characteristics

- Crew: one
- Length: 4.35 m (14 ft 3 in)
- Wingspan: 6 m (19 ft 8 in)
- Height: 1.23 m (4 ft 0 in)
- Wing area: 6 m^{2} (65 sq ft)
- Airfoil: GA 37U-A315
- Empty weight: 110 kg (243 lb)
- Gross weight: 240 kg (529 lb)
- Fuel capacity: 34 litres (7.5 imp gal; 9.0 US gal)
- Powerplant: 1 × Hirth F33 single cylinder, air-cooled, two stroke aircraft engine, 21 kW (28 hp)
- Propellers: 2-bladed wooden, 1.2 m (3 ft 11 in) diameter

Performance

- Maximum speed: 185 km/h (115 mph, 100 kn)
- Cruise speed: 135 km/h (84 mph, 73 kn)
- Stall speed: 63 km/h (39 mph, 34 kn) flaperons deployed
- Never exceed speed: 210 km/h (130 mph, 110 kn)
- g limits: +4/-2
- Maximum glide ratio: 13:1
- Rate of climb: 3 m/s (590 ft/min)
- Wing loading: 40 kg/m^{2} (8.2 lb/sq ft)

== See also ==
Similar aircraft

- PIK-26
- Sonex Aircraft Onex
- Corby Starlet
- Pazmany PL-4
- Mooney M-18 Mite
