= Raceair Lil Bitts =

Lil Bitts
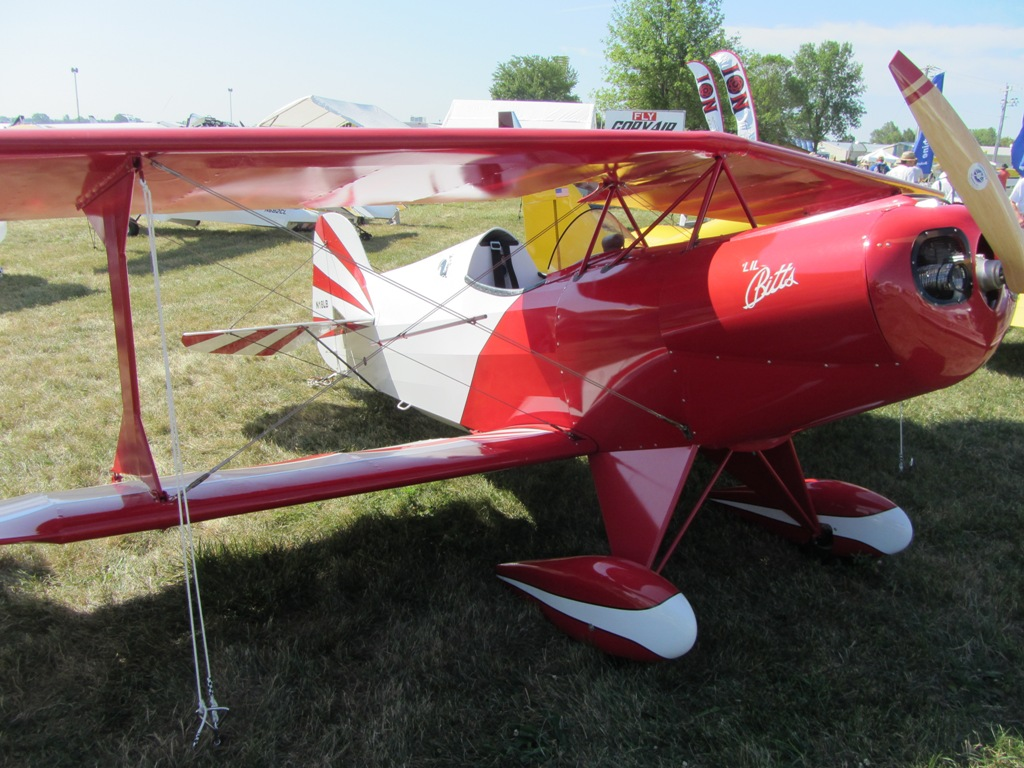

General information
- Type: Homebuilt aircraft
- National origin: United States
- Manufacturer: Raceair Designs
- Designer: Ed Fisher
- Number built: 1

History
- Introduction date: 2007
- First flight: 2007
- Developed from: Green Sky Adventures Micro Mong

The Racair Lil Bitts is a modification of the Micro Mong light biplane to resemble a Pitts Special marketed by Raceair Designs of Gilbert, South Carolina. The aircraft was also supplied by Wings Of Freedom., but by late 2019 the company website had been taken down and it is likely that production had ended.

== Development ==
Ed Fisher developed the Micro Mong in 1993. The Lil Bitts fuselage was welded at the same time with slight modification to resemble a Pitts Special. The project was sold and bought back several times before completion in 2007. The basis for the name Lil Bitts is a combination of 'Pitts' Special, and 'Lil Stinker', the Pitts Special flown by aerobatic performer Betty Skelton. The plans for the aircraft are currently marketed by Raceair.

== Design ==
The Lil Bitts is a single seat biplane with conventional landing gear constructed from welded steel tubing with aircraft fabric covering. The wing spars are constructed of aluminum tubing with aluminum ribs and fabric covering.

== Operational history ==
The Lil Bitts prototype won Experimental-Class Best Fabric award at Sun 'n Fun 2007.

== Specifications (Lil Bitts) ==
Data from EAA Experimenter

General characteristics

- Capacity: 1
- Length: 15 ft (4.6 m)
- Wingspan: 19 ft 4 in (5.89 m)
- Height: 5 ft 7 in (1.70 m)
- Wing area: 112 sq ft (10.4 m^{2})
- Empty weight: 432 lb (196 kg)
- Gross weight: 800 lb (363 kg)
- Fuel capacity: 12 U.S. gallons (45 L; 10.0 imp gal)
- Powerplant: 1 × Rotax 582 two-cylinder, two-cycle, liquid-cooled engine, 64 hp (48 kW)
- Propellers: 2-bladed Warp drive

Performance

- Maximum speed: 95 kn (109 mph, 175 km/h)
- Cruise speed: 83 kn (95 mph, 153 km/h)
- Stall speed: 34 kn (39 mph, 63 km/h)
- Rate of climb: 1,700 ft/min (8.6 m/s)
- Wing loading: 7.1 lb/sq ft (35 kg/m^{2})

== See also ==
Related development

- Green Sky Adventures Micro Mong

Aircraft of comparable role, configuration, and era

- Pitts Special
