= Bautek =

German aircraft manufacturer

- Company type: Private company
- Industry: Aerospace
- Headquarters: Kenn, Germany
- Products: Hang gliders Ultralight trikes
- Website: www.bautek.com

Bautek is a German aircraft manufacturer based in Kenn. The company specializes in hang gliders and ultralight trikes.

In 2009 the company branched out from producing hang gliders and constructed their first trike design, the Bautek Skycruiser.

== Aircraft ==
Summary of aircraft built by Bautek
Model name	First flight	Number built	Type
Bautek Astir			hang glider
Bautek Bico			hang glider
Bautek Fizz			hang glider
Bautek Kite			hang glider
Bautek Milan Racer			hang glider
Bautek Spice	2003		hang glider
Bautek Sunrise			hang glider
Bautek Twister			hang glider
Bautek Pico			ultralight trike wing
Bautek Skycruiser	2009		ultralight trike
