= Raceair Skylite =

American ultralight airplane

Skylite
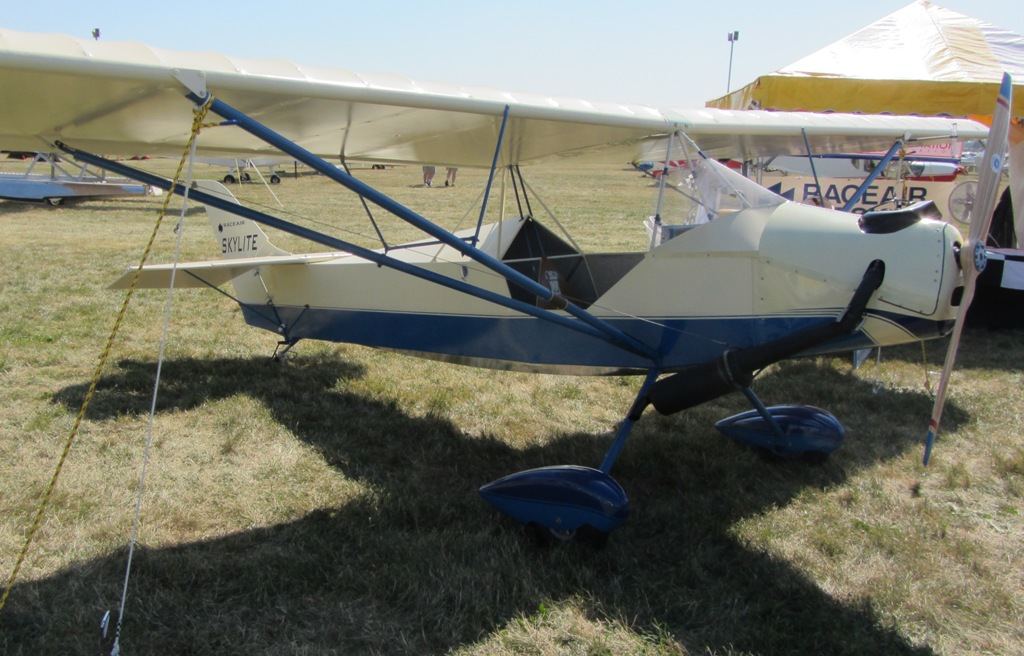
- Skylite

General information
- Type: Ultralight aircraft
- National origin: United States
- Manufacturer: Raceair Designs; Wings Of Freedom
- Designer: Ed Fisher
- Status: Production completed (2019)
- Number built: 26 (1998)

History
- Introduction date: 1991

The Raceair Skylite is an American ultralight aircraft that was designed by Ed Fisher and made available in the form of plans for amateur construction, by Raceair Designs.

The Skylite design was started in 1988 and the completed aircraft was first shown at Oshkosh in 1991.

It was also sold by Wings of Freedom, but by late 2019 the company website had been taken down and it is likely that production had ended.

== Design and development ==
The aircraft was designed to comply with the US FAR 103 Ultralight Vehicles rules, including the category's maximum empty weight of 254 lb (115 kg). The aircraft has a standard empty weight of 240 lb (109 kg). It features a strut-braced high wing, a single-seat, open cockpit, conventional landing gear and a single engine in tractor configuration. The design is intended to resemble the high-wing air racers of the 1930s.

The Skylite is constructed with a welded 4130 steel tube fuselage, with the wings built from riveted and gussetted aluminum tubing. The wing ribs are made from angled aluminum and have an 18 in (46 cm) spacing between them. All surfaces are covered in 1.6 oz aircraft fabric finished with latex. Its 29.1 ft (8.9 m) span wing is supported by "V" lift struts and jury struts and features full-span ailerons. The vertical stabilizer is highly swept back. The pilot is accommodated in a semi-enclosed cockpit with a windshield. The specified engine was the Rotax 277 of 28 hp (21 kW), but being plans-built other powerplants were also used.

Due to its plans-built construction and complex design, only a small number of aircraft were completed before the plans were initially taken off the market. Today plans and kits are again available from Wings Of Freedom of Hubbard, Ohio as well as the newly resurrected Raceair Designs. Construction time is estimated as 750 hours.

== Operational history ==
The design won Grand Champion Ultralight at AirVenture in 1991.

By 1998 the company reported that 300 kits and plans had been sold and 26 aircraft were completed and flying.

== Specifications (Skylite) ==
Data from Cliche and the Virtual Ultralight Museum

General characteristics

- Crew: one
- Length: 17 ft 6 in (5.33 m)
- Wingspan: 29.1 ft (8.9 m)
- Wing area: 117 sq ft (10.9 m^{2})
- Empty weight: 240 lb (109 kg)
- Gross weight: 520 lb (236 kg)
- Fuel capacity: 5 U.S. gallons (19 L; 4.2 imp gal)
- Powerplant: 1 × Rotax 277 , 28 hp (21 kW)

Performance

- Maximum speed: 60 mph (97 km/h, 52 kn)
- Cruise speed: 47 mph (76 km/h, 41 kn)
- Stall speed: 27 mph (43 km/h, 23 kn)
- Range: 90 mi (140 km, 78 nmi)
- Service ceiling: 9,000 ft (2,700 m)
- Rate of climb: 400 ft/min (2.0 m/s)
- Wing loading: 4.44 lb/sq ft (21.7 kg/m^{2})
