= Chotia Woodhopper =

American ultralight aircraft

Woodhopper

General information
- Type: Ultralight aircraft
- National origin: United States
- Manufacturer: Vintage Ultralight and Lightplane Association
- Designer: John Chotia
- Status: Plans available

History
- Introduction date: 1978
- Developed from: Chotia Weedhopper
- Variant: Chotia Gypsy

The Chotia Woodhopper is an American ultralight aircraft that was designed by John Chotia and made available in the form of plans for amateur construction. The plans remain available from the Vintage Ultralight and Lightplane Association.

== Design and development ==
The Woodhopper was a development of the highly successful Weedhopper, substituting wood for aluminum tubing wherever possible and simplifying the design to reduce cost. It is therefore essentially a wooden Weedhopper. Both aircraft pre-dated the US FAR 103 Ultralight Vehicles rules, but comply with them, including the category's maximum empty weight of 254 lb (115 kg). The Woodhopper has a standard empty weight of 145 lb (66 kg). It features a cable-braced high-wing, a single-seat, open cockpit, tricycle landing gear and a single engine in tractor configuration.

The aircraft is of mixed construction and is optimized for low cost and ease of building. The pilot cage, landing gear and kingpost are made from aluminum tubing, while the main fuselage keel, wings and tail surfaces are all wooden structures. The Woodhopper's flying surfaces are covered in doped aircraft fabric. Its 32 ft (9.8 m) span wing is cable-braced from the single, tube-style kingpost and the whole airframe is liberally supported with a large number of steel cables.

The control system is two-axis and consists of a sidestick that moves longitudinally to control the elevator for pitch and laterally to actuate the rudder for yaw control. Roll is induced by yaw-roll coupling as a result of the wing's dihedral. This control system does not allow crosswind landings, but it does make learning to fly the aircraft easy and also greatly simplifies the construction of the wing, as it has no control surfaces on it. The Woodhopper can be flown on wheels and floats.

The Woodhopper was featured on the cover of Popular Mechanics in 1978, and as a result a large number of plans were sold and many aircraft were completed and flown. Construction time from the plans is estimated at 250–300 hours. Performance is determined by the engine fitted, and a wide variety of small two-stroke engines have been employed. The Woodhopper was later developed into the Gypsy.

== Specifications (Woodhopper) ==
Data from Cliche and the Virtual Ultralight Museum

General characteristics

- Crew: one
- Length: 17 ft 6 in (5.33 m)
- Wingspan: 32 ft 0 in (9.75 m)
- Height: 7.9 ft (2.4 m)
- Wing area: 157 sq ft (14.6 m^{2})
- Empty weight: 145 lb (66 kg)
- Gross weight: 360 lb (163 kg)
- Fuel capacity: 2 U.S. gallons (7.6 L; 1.7 imp gal)

Performance

- g limits: +3.5
- Maximum glide ratio: 9:1
