= Fisher FP-303 =

Canadian homebuilt light aircraft

FP-303

General information
- Type: Kit aircraft
- National origin: Canada
- Manufacturer: Fisher Flying Products
- Number built: 205 (2011)

History
- Introduction date: 1984
- First flight: 1982

The Fisher FP-303 is a Canadian single-seat, low wing, conventional landing gear, single engined light kit aircraft designed for construction by amateur builders. Fisher Flying Products was originally based in Edgeley, North Dakota, USA but the company is now located in Woodbridge, Ontario, Canada.

== Development ==
The FP-303 was designed by Fisher Aircraft in the United States in 1982 and was intended to meet the requirements of the US FAR 103 Ultralight Vehicles category, including that category's maximum 254 lb (115 kg) empty weight. The design goal was to provide ultralight pilots with an aircraft that was as portable as possible. To this end the aircraft's wings fold along the fuselage to rest on the horizontal stabilizer allowing trailering or storage in a small hangar or with other aircraft. The aircraft can be field assembled from its travelling state in ten minutes. The FP-303 has a standard empty weight of 235 lb (107 kg) when equipped with a two-stroke 28 hp (21 kW) Rotax 277 engine.

The construction of the FP-303 is similar to the Fisher FP-202 Koala. The aircraft's structure is entirely made from wood, with the wooden fuselage built from wood strips arranged in a geodesic form, resulting in a very strong and light aircraft with redundant load paths. Both the wings and fuselage are covered with doped aircraft fabric. The wings are strut-braced underneath to the landing gear and utilize bottom jury struts. The wing is positioned aft enough that the pilot has adequate downward visibility. Flaps and brakes are optional. The company claims it takes an amateur builder between 300–500 hours to build the FP-303.

== Specifications (FP-303) ==
Data from Company website, Kitplanes and Cliche

General characteristics

- Crew: one
- Capacity: 215 lb (98 kg), no passengers
- Length: 16 ft 6 in (5.03 m)
- Wingspan: 27 ft 8 in (8.46 m)
- Height: 5 ft 2 in (1.53 m)
- Wing area: 111 sq ft (10.32 m^{2})
- Airfoil: modified USA 35B
- Empty weight: 235 lb (107 kg)
- Max takeoff weight: 450 lb (204 kg)
- Powerplant: 1 × Rotax 277 single cylinder, two-stroke piston engine, 28 hp (21 kW)

Performance

- Cruise speed: 60 mph (97 km/h, 52 kn)
- Stall speed: 25 mph (41 km/h, 22 kn)
- Never exceed speed: 70 mph (113 km/h, 61 kn)
- Rate of climb: 800 ft/min (4.1 m/s)
- Wing loading: 4.1 lb/sq ft (19.76 kg/m^{2})
- Power/mass: 16 lb/hp (0.10 kW/kg)

== See also ==
Aircraft of comparable role, configuration, and era

- Airdrome Eindecker E-III
- Ameri-Cana Eureka
- Fisher Avenger
- Hummel Bird
- Hummel CA-2
