= DAR 21 Vector II =

Bulgarian ultralight aircraft

General information
- Type: Ultralight aircraft
- National origin: Bulgaria
- Manufacturer: Aeroplanes DAR
- Status: Production completed (2014)

History
- Manufactured: 2001-2014
- First flight: 1 August 2000

The DAR 21 Vector II is a Bulgarian ultralight aircraft, designed and produced by Aeroplanes DAR, first flying on 1 August 2000.

When it was available the aircraft was supplied as a kit for amateur construction or as a complete ready-to-fly-aircraft.

The aircraft was introduced in 2001 and production apparently ended in 2014, as by that year the aircraft was no longer advertised for sale by the company.

== Design and development ==
The aircraft was designed to comply with the Fédération Aéronautique Internationale microlight rules. It features a strut-braced high wing, a two-seats-in-tandem enclosed cockpit, conventional landing gear and a single engine in tractor configuration.

The Vector II has riveted stressed skin made with 1050 and 3105 aluminum sheet for corrosion resistance. The fuselage has a square cross-section. Its 9.2 m (30.2 ft) span wing employs flaps that can be set to 15° for takeoff and 30° for landing. The standard engine available is the 64 hp (48 kW) Rotax 582 twin-cylinder, liquid-cooled, two-stroke powerplant, with the four-stroke 80 hp (60 kW) Rotax 912 optional. Solo flight is accomplished from the front seat.

== Variants ==
DAR 21
Standard version with bungee main landing gear suspension.
DAR 21S
Upgraded version with aluminum sprung main landing gear suspension for increased ground clearance.

== Specifications (DAR 21) ==
Data from Bayerl and DAR

General characteristics

- Crew: one
- Capacity: one passenger
- Length: 6.35 m (20 ft 10 in)
- Wingspan: 9.42 m (30 ft 11 in)
- Height: 1.80 m (5 ft 11 in)
- Wing area: 12.42 m^{2} (133.7 sq ft)
- Empty weight: 250 kg (551 lb)
- Gross weight: 450 kg (992 lb)
- Fuel capacity: 32 litres (7.0 imp gal; 8.5 US gal)
- Powerplant: 1 × Rotax 582 twin cylinder, liquid-cooled, two stroke, 48 kW (64 hp)

Performance

- Maximum speed: 200 km/h (120 mph, 110 kn)
- Cruise speed: 175 km/h (109 mph, 94 kn)
- Stall speed: 58 km/h (36 mph, 31 kn) at gross weight, flaps down
- Never exceed speed: 205 km/h (127 mph, 111 kn)
- g limits: +4/-2
- Rate of climb: 5 m/s (980 ft/min)
- Wing loading: 36.2 kg/m^{2} (7.4 lb/sq ft)
