= Briggs & Stratton Vanguard Big Block V-Twin =

American piston engine

Vanguard Big Block V-Twin
- Type: Aircraft engine
- National origin: United States
- Manufacturer: Briggs & Stratton

The Briggs & Stratton Vanguard Big Block V-Twin is a series of American piston engines, designed and produced by Briggs & Stratton of Wauwatosa, Wisconsin for use in commercial applications. They have also been adapted for use as ultralight aircraft engines.

== Design and development ==
The engine is a V-twin four-stroke, 895 cc (54.6 cu in) or 993 cc (60.6 cu in) displacement, fan-driven air-cooled, gasoline engine design. The larger displacement is achieved by increasing the stroke from 78 to 87 mm (3.1 to 3.4 in), but using the same bore of 86 mm (3.4 in). In aviation applications it is used as a direct drive engine, turning a propeller without a reduction drive. It employs a single electronic ignition system and produces 25 to 37 hp (19 to 28 kW) at 3600 rpm.

== Variants ==
Vanguard Big Block V-Twin 895cc
Model with 895 cc (54.6 cu in) displacement, bore of 86 mm (3.4 in), a stroke of 78 mm (3.1 in) and a power output of 25 to 33 hp (19 to 25 kW) at 3600 rpm
Vanguard Big Block V-Twin 993cc
Model with 993 cc (60.6 cu in) displacement, bore of 86 mm (3.4 in), a stroke of 87 mm (3.4 in) and a power output of 33 to 37 hp (25 to 28 kW) at 3600 rpm

== Applications ==
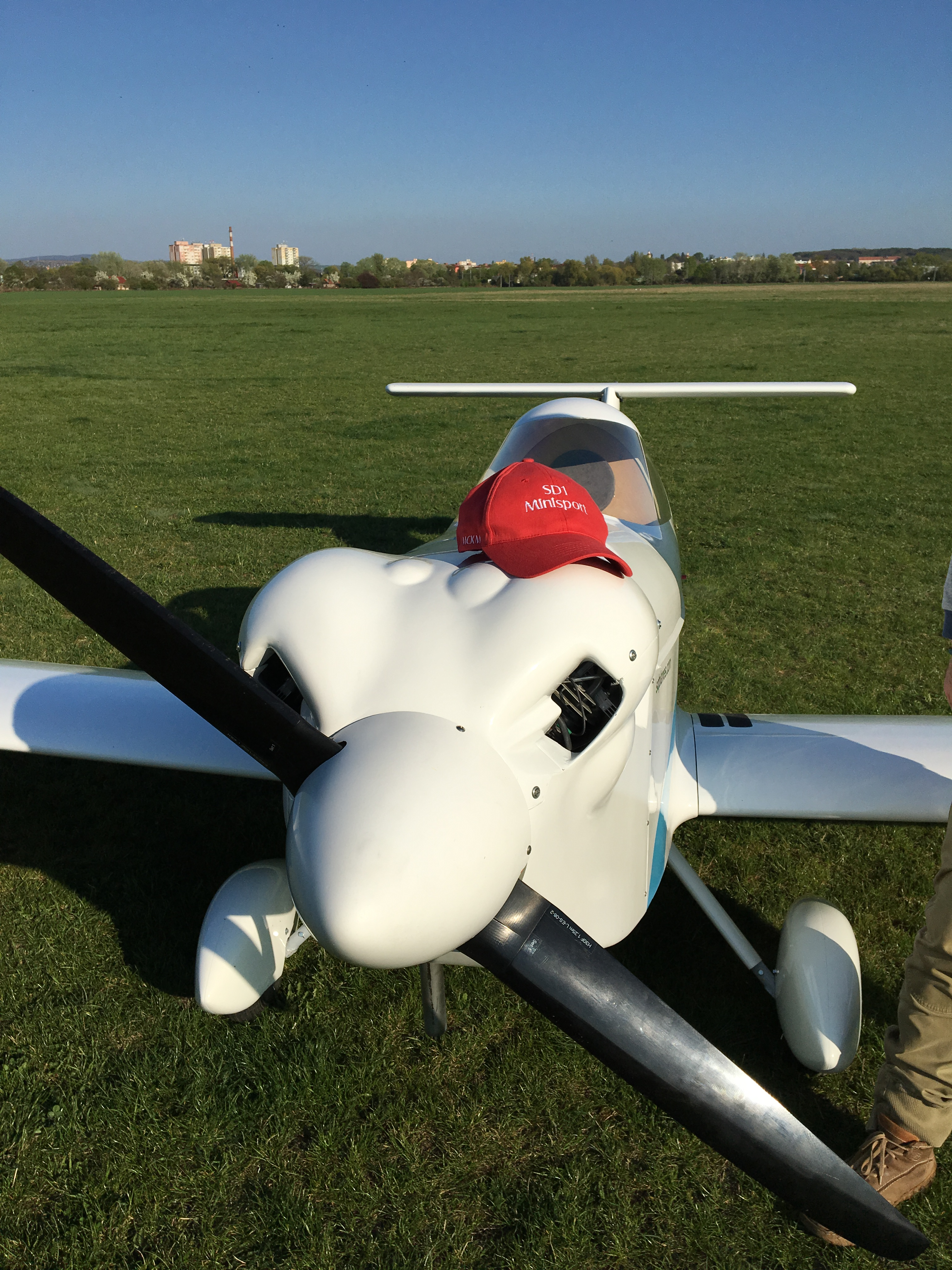
Spacek SD-1 Minisport with Briggs & Stratton Vanguard 33 hp engine

- Bautek Skycruiser
- Parazoom Trio-Star Delta
- Spacek SD-1 Minisport

== Specifications (31 hp model) ==
Data from Tacke

=== General characteristics ===
- Type: V-twin, four-stroke aircraft engine
- Bore: 86 mm (3.4 in)
- Stroke: 78 mm (3.1 in)
- Displacement: 895 cc (54.6 cu in)
- Length: 384 mm (15.1 in)
- Width: 496 mm (19.5 in)
- Height: 725 mm (28.5 in)
- Dry weight: 57 kg (125.7 lb)

=== Components ===
- Fuel type: gasoline
- Cooling system: fan-forced air
- Reduction gear: none

=== Performance ===
- Power output: 31 hp (23 kW)

== See also ==
Related lists

- List of aircraft engines
