= Ameri-Cana Ultralights =

Canadian aircraft manufacturer

- Type: Private company
- Industry: Aerospace
- Founded: 1997
- Fate: ceased operations July 2003
- Headquarters: Irricana, Alberta
- Key people: Wilf Stark
- Products: kit aircraft

Ameri-Cana Ultralights was a Canadian aircraft manufacturer that was formed to produce the Ameri-Cana Eureka for the US FAR 103 Ultralight Vehicles category and the American market.

== History ==
The company was formed by Wilf Stark in 1997 with the successful first flight of the Eureka. The aircraft was intended to fill what Ameri-Cana perceived as an under-served niche in the market - an inexpensive ultralight that was also quick to assemble. The Eureka was initially sold complete, including an engine, for US$6000 and could be assembled in two weekends.

The prototype Eureka first flew in August 1997. The company then commenced manufacturing and marketing kits.

In 1999, reviewer Andre Cliche said: "The kit sells for $6000, which is amazingly low when you consider that this number even includes the engine, propeller and basic instruments. I wonder if they will stay in business for long with such a low profit margin?"

After introduction, the price was increased to US$5000 for the airframe alone, estimating that it could be completed for US$8000 total. The company ceased providing kits in July 2003, stating "The Eureka has been withdrawn from the market due to lack of resources."

== Aircraft ==
Summary of aircraft built by Ameri-Cana Ultralights
Model name	First flight	Number built	Type
Ameri-Cana Eureka	1997		single seat ultralight aircraft
