= Air Sports AIRector 120 =

German ultralight aircraft

AIRector 120

General information
- Type: Ultralight aircraft
- National origin: Germany
- Manufacturer: Air Sports Aircrafts [sic]
- Status: In production

History
- Manufactured: 2012-present
- Introduction date: 2010

The Air Sports AIRector 120 is a German ultralight aircraft, designed and produced by Air Sports Aircrafts [sic] of Dassel. It was introduced at the Aero show held in Friedrichshafen in 2010.

== Design and development ==
The aircraft was designed to comply with the Fédération Aéronautique Internationale microlight rules. It features a cantilever low-wing, a single-seat, enclosed cockpit, fixed conventional landing gear and a single engine in tractor configuration.

The aircraft is made from composites and has a very low empty weight of 120 kg (264.6 lb). The initial standard engine is the 50 hp (37 kW) Hirth F23 two-stroke powerplant, but it is expected that an all-electric drive train will be available soon.

== Variants ==
AIRector 120
Original model
AIRector 300
Model introduced in 2015 with retractable landing gear and a 130 hp (97 kW) engine.

== Specifications (AIRector 120) ==
Data from Bayerl

General characteristics

- Crew: one
- Wingspan: 8.02 m (26 ft 4 in)
- Empty weight: 120 kg (265 lb)
- Gross weight: 242 kg (534 lb)
- Fuel capacity: 30 litres (6.6 imp gal; 7.9 US gal)
- Powerplant: 1 × Hirth F23 two cylinder, air-cooled, two stroke, 37 kW (50 hp)
- Propellers: 3-bladed composite

Performance

- Maximum speed: 180 km/h (110 mph, 97 kn)
- Cruise speed: 160 km/h (99 mph, 86 kn)
- Rate of climb: 5 m/s (980 ft/min)
