= SDB Karat =

Russian ultralight trike

Karat

General information
- Type: Ultralight trike
- National origin: Russia
- Manufacturer: SDB
- Status: Production completed

The SDB Karat is a Russian ultralight trike that was designed and produced by SDB of Moscow. The aircraft was supplied as a complete ready-to-fly-aircraft.

SDB was an enterprise of the Moscow State Technical University of Civil Aviation. The SDB website has been removed from the internet and the enterprise seems to have gone out of business, ending production of the Karat.

== Design and development ==
The Karat is a nanotrike that was designed to comply with the US FAR 103 Ultralight Vehicles rules, including the category's maximum empty weight of 254 lb (115 kg). The aircraft has a standard empty weight of 201 lb (91 kg). It features a cable-braced hang glider-style high-wing, weight-shift controls, a single-seat open cockpit without a cockpit fairing, tricycle landing gear and a single engine in pusher configuration.

The aircraft is made from bolted-together aluminum tubing, with its single or double surface wing covered in Dacron sailcloth. It was designed to be light enough to accept any hang glider wing with a high enough gross weight. A typical wing used would have a 9.8 m (32.2 ft) span, be supported by a single tube-type kingpost and use an "A" frame weight-shift control bar. The standard powerplant is a single cylinder, air-cooled, two-stroke, 28 hp (21 kW) Hirth F33 engine. The aircraft has an empty weight of 91 kg (201 lb) and a gross weight of 220 kg (485 lb), giving a useful load of 129 kg (284 lb). With full fuel of 30 litres (6.6 imp gal; 7.9 US gal) the payload is 107 kg (236 lb).

When it was available the trike was sold as a fuselage frame and engine, with the customer providing the hang glider wing.

== Specifications (Karat) ==
Data from Bayerl

General characteristics

- Crew: one
- Wingspan: 9.8 m (32 ft 2 in)
- Wing area: 10.0 m^{2} (108 sq ft)
- Empty weight: 91 kg (201 lb)
- Gross weight: 220 kg (485 lb)
- Fuel capacity: 30 litres (6.6 imp gal; 7.9 US gal)
- Powerplant: 1 × Hirth F33 single cylinder, air-cooled, two stroke aircraft engine, 21 kW (28 hp)
- Propellers: 2-bladed wooden

Performance

- Maximum speed: 125 km/h (78 mph, 67 kn)
- Cruise speed: 90 km/h (56 mph, 49 kn)
- Stall speed: 45 km/h (28 mph, 24 kn)
- Rate of climb: 2.1 m/s (410 ft/min)
- Wing loading: 22.0 kg/m^{2} (4.5 lb/sq ft)
