= Raceair Designs =

American aircraft manufacturer

Raceair Designs LLC
- Company type: Privately held company
- Industry: Aerospace
- Founded: 1989
- Headquarters: Gilbert, South Carolina, United States
- Key people: Ed Fisher
- Products: Kit aircraft
- Website: www.raceairdesigns.com

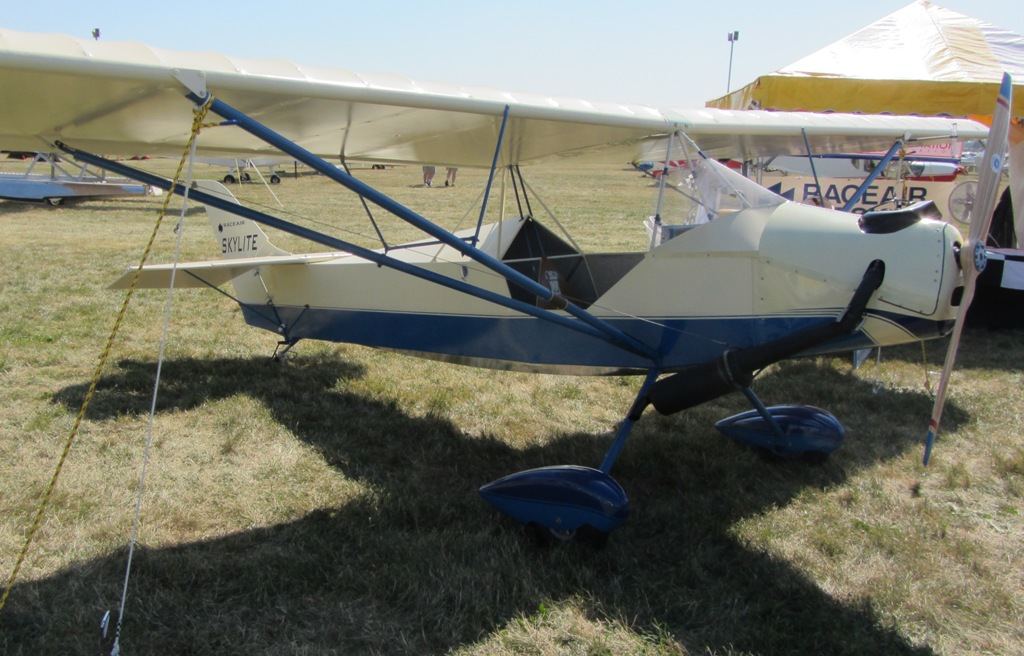
Raceair Skylite

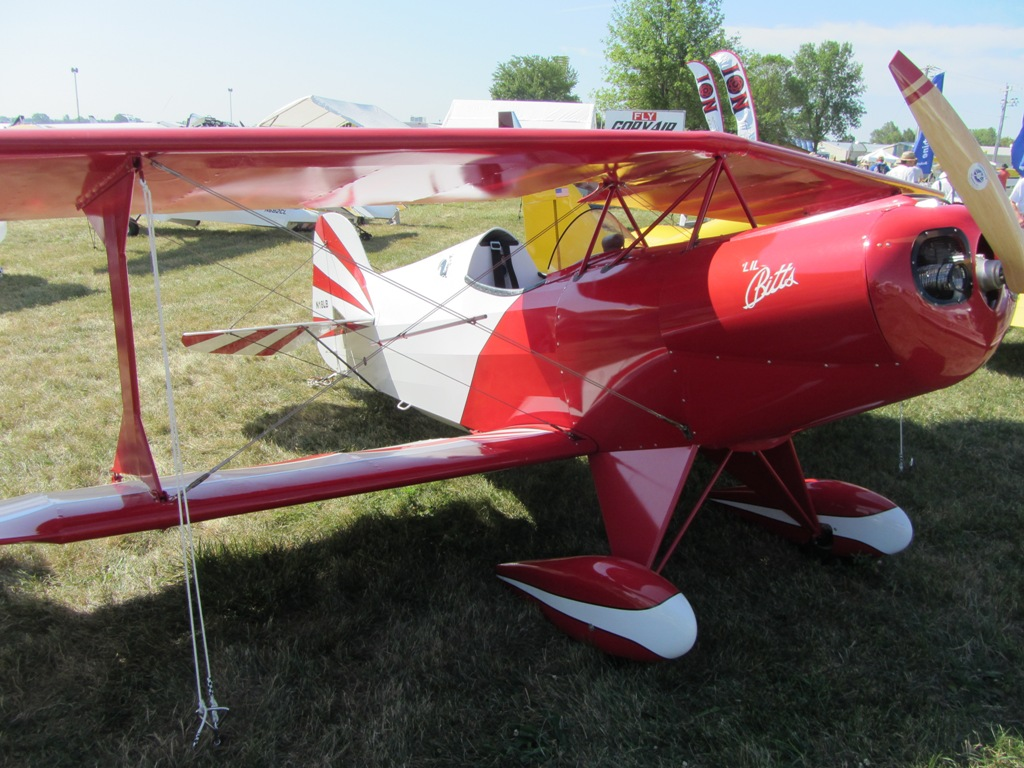
Raceair LiL Bitts

Raceair Designs LLC is an American aircraft manufacturer based in Gilbert, South Carolina, founded by designer Ed Fisher. The company was formerly located in Mayville, New York and Warren, Ohio. The company specializes in the design and manufacture of ultralight aircraft in the form of plans and kits for amateur construction and complete ready-to-fly aircraft under the US FAR 103 Ultralight Vehicles rules.

The company only offered plans and kits for a short while and then closed down operations in the late 1990s. Its Raceair Skylite and Raceair LiL Bitts designs are also produced by Wings Of Freedom of Hubbard, Ohio. Raceair Designs is now back in operations.

== Aircraft ==
Summary of aircraft built by Raceair Designs
Model name	First flight	Number built	Type
Raceair Skylite	1991	26 (1998)	Single seat ultralight parasol wing aircraft
Raceair Lil Bitts	2007	1	Single seat biplane
