= Moscow State Technical University of Civil Aviation =

Soviet and Russian state university

Coordinates: 55°50′35″N 37°30′23″E

Creating Moscow State Technical University of Civil Aviation
- Established: 1971
- Location: Moscow, Russian Federation
- Website: mstuca.ru

Moscow State Technical University of Civil Aviation (MSTUCA) is a higher education institute in Russia that trains civil aviation specialists and acts as a center of science and culture training of specialists and fundamental scientific research in the fields of science, technology, humanities, and economics. It is located in Moscow and was founded in 1971.

== General Information ==
The university has links with foreign educational institutions and trains foreign students from over 30 countries.

The university departments are headed by experienced scientists and academics. There are professors from different public and scientific academies in Russia and abroad. The training and research laboratories are equipped with modern computers, instruments and devices, simulators, working models of aviation equipment, technical training, and knowledge test aids. This makes it possible to conduct classes and perform scientific work at a modern level of science and technology.

The university library contains textbooks on specialties of all the departments; there are publications on crucial problems of science, technology, and social sciences. It is one of the best aviation-oriented libraries in Russia.

The MSTUCA has a dormitory located in a park, not far from the university and the underground station. The students live in rooms for two or three persons.

The university's facilities provide good conditions for amateur activities, student festivals, concerts of masters of art and popular musical groups. It also has a sports complex and many sports clubs.

Foreign students are trained together with Russian students. Training is conducted in Russian.

== Academic ethics violations ==
The rector of MSTU CA was accused of academic dishonesty and stripped of Doctor Nauk degree on 25 January 2019. Nevertheless, he continues to head the institution.

== See also ==
- SDB Karat, an ultralight trike aircraft design developed at the university
