= DAR-23 =

Bulgarian ultralight aircraft

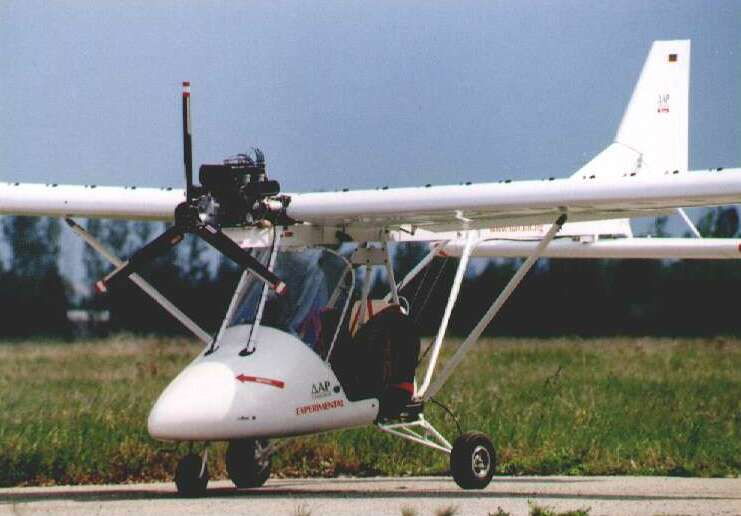

General information
- Type: Amateur-built ultralight aircraft
- National origin: Bulgaria
- Manufacturer: Aeroplanes DAR
- Status: Under re-development (March 2014)
- Number built: At least two prototypes

History
- Introduction date: 2001
- First flight: August 2001

The DAR-23 is a Bulgarian ultralight aircraft, designed and produced by Aeroplanes DAR, first flying in August 2001.

The aircraft is supplied as a kit for amateur construction.

The DAR-23 project started in December 2000, with the prototype completed in August 2001. The design was first displayed in North America at AirVenture in July 2012. There is no indication that any more than two prototypes have been completed or that series production has commenced.

In March 2014 the company indicated that the design was being re-developed.

== Design and development ==
The DAR-23 features a strut-braced high-wing, a two-seats-in-side-by-side configuration open cockpit with a windshield, fixed tricycle landing gear and a single engine in tractor configuration, mounted high above the cockpit.

The aircraft structure is made from a combination of 1050, 2024, 3130 and 6164 aluminum tubing, with the main beam, cockpit pod and main landing gear made from composites. The landing gear is pyramidal in design. Its all-metal wing employs composite flaperons. Controls are actuated by push-pull cables, while the elevator trim is electric. The nosewheel is steerable. The aircraft's recommended engine power range is 50 to 64 hp (37 to 48 kW) and standard engines used include the 50 hp (37 kW) Hirth F-23, the 50 hp (37 kW) Rotax 503 and the 64 hp (48 kW) Rotax 582 two-stroke powerplants. Construction time from the supplied standard kit is estimated as 350 hours, although a quick-build kit is also available.

== Specifications (DAR-23) ==
Data from Jane's All the World's Aircraft 2007–2008

General characteristics

- Crew: one
- Capacity: one passenger
- Length: 5.00 m (16 ft 5 in)
- Wingspan: 8.00 m (26 ft 3 in)
- Height: 1.80 m (5 ft 11 in) (at wing)
- Wing area: 10.40 m^{2} (111.9 sq ft)
- Empty weight: 180 kg (397 lb)
- Gross weight: 380 kg (838 lb)
- Fuel capacity: 30 L (7.9 US gal; 6.6 imp gal)
- Powerplant: 1 × Rotax 503 twin cylinder, air-cooled, two stroke aircraft engine, 34 kW (46 hp)

Performance

- Maximum speed: 125 km/h (78 mph, 67 kn)
- Cruise speed: 95 km/h (59 mph, 51 kn)
- Stall speed: 50 km/h (31 mph, 27 kn)
- Endurance: 3 hr
