= Aeronix Airelle =

Airelle
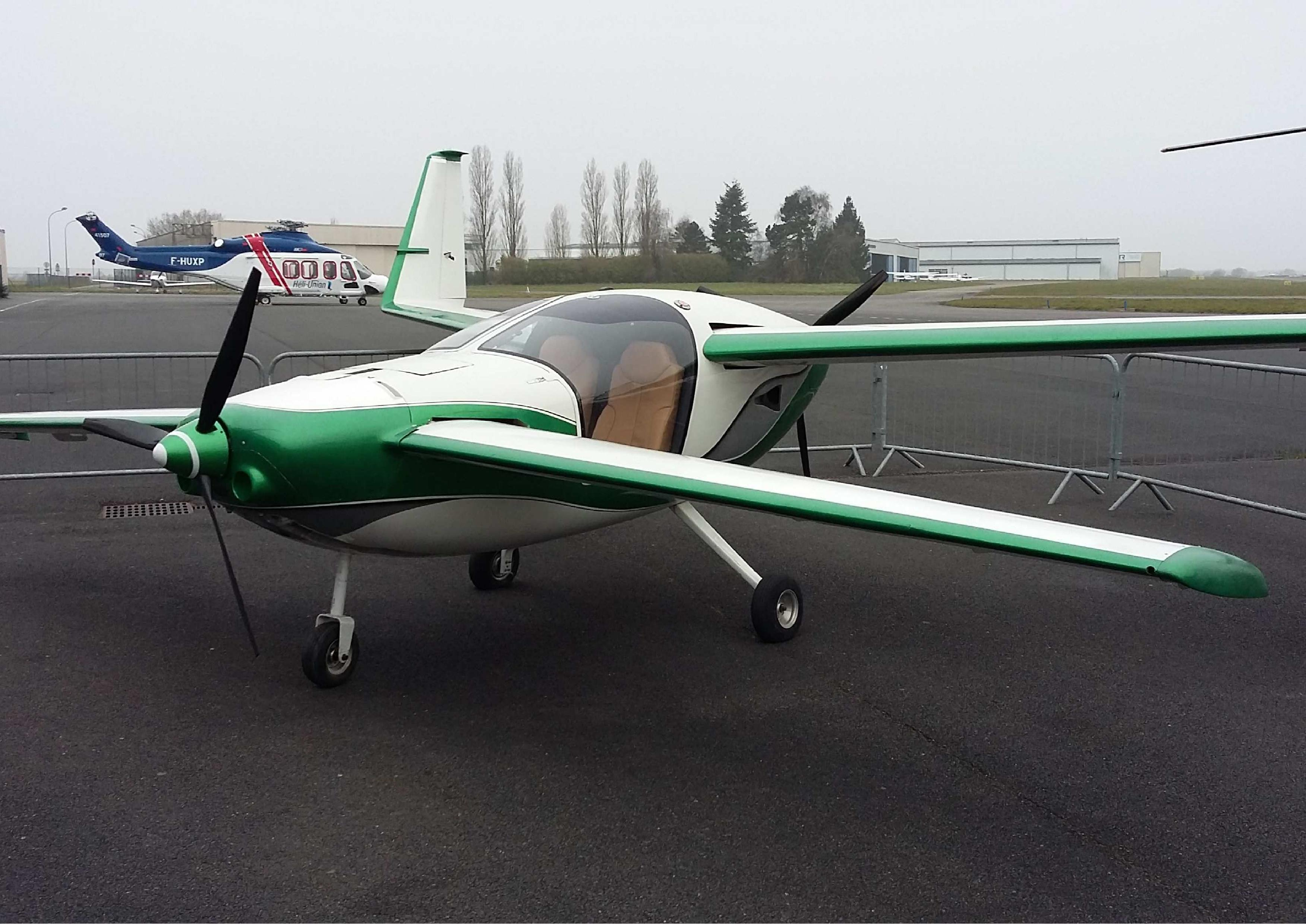

General information
- Type: Kit-built ultralight
- National origin: France
- Manufacturer: Aeronix sarl, La Chapelle-Vendômoise
- Status: Out of production
- Number built: 5

History
- First flight: February 2002

The Aeronix Airelle is a tandem wing ultralight with twin engines in push-pull configuration, that was designed and built in France at the start of the millennium. It was intended to be homebuilt from kits, and a few prototypes were constructed, but development ended when the company went into receivership in 2006.

== Design and development ==
Design of the Airelle began in 1999, and a one third scale model flew the following October. The full scale Airelle was formally introduced with a mock-up at the Paris air show held at le Bourget in June 2003, although its first flight was made in February 2002.

Its layout is very unusual, both in that it has a tandem pair of wings, and that its twin engines are in push-pull configuration. The rear wing has the greater span and chord, and is swept (at 30°) and tapered, with outward-leaning fins and rudders at its tips, rather as in traditional lifting canard aircraft. However, the unswept, straight tapered foreplane has a much greater fore/rear wing span ratio (about 80%) than most of this type, for example 66% for the World War II Miles Libellula. The whole trailing edge of each rear wing, which has a dihedral of 2°, is occupied by a combination of outboard mass balanced ailerons and inboard plain flaps. The foreplane has full span elevators and slightly turned down tips. The wings, like the rest of the Airelle's structure, is largely carbon fibre. The fins have inward turned tips. The Airelle's rudders have several modes of operation: used together they control yaw, as normal; they can be split on one side only, as spoilers, or both faces can separate to act as airbrakes.

The Airelle's fuselage is short, with the centrally hinged, forward opening, transparent cabin doors between the wings and engines. Both two and four seat variants were planned. A glass cockpit and a control system without rudder bars is fitted. The fuselage is deeper aft, carrying the rear wing higher than the foreplane. The prototype Airelles were powered by 30 kW (40 hp) Zanzottera flat twin engines, though Hirth F23ES engines of the same power and configuration were planned for production aircraft, and a projected VLA version was intended to take engines of up 75 kW (100 hp). The Airelle has a tricycle undercarriage with sprung, composite main legs mounted on the fuselage.

== Operational history ==
After the Paris Air Show of 2003, Aeronix concentrated on promoting and delivering kits of the ultralight version, with deliveries starting that year. By June 2003, seven had been sold. By 2005, at least five had been built and the third prototype, with the French experimental registration F-WATC flew at that year's Paris show. By that time the, first two Airelles were in storage at the Aeronix factory, the second prototype having been damaged in an engine fire during testing. The fifth Airelle was prepared for a Pole-to-Pole publicity flight, equipped with non-standard instrumentation. Gary Purdom, the company test pilot, was to fly the aircraft, but before it could be done Aeronix went into receivership in February 2006.

== Specifications (Ultralight prototype) ==
Data from Jane's All the World's Aircraft 2006-7: performance estimated

General characteristics

- Capacity: 2
- Length: 5.88 m (19 ft 3 in)
- Wingspan: 9.46 m (31 ft 0 in)
- Height: 3.015 m (9 ft 11 in)
- Wing area: 15.00 m^{2} (161.5 sq ft)
- Empty weight: 295 kg (650 lb)
- Max takeoff weight: 472.5 kg (1,042 lb)
- Fuel capacity: 60 L (16 US gal; 13 imp gal)
- Powerplant: 2 × Zanzottera MZ 201 flat twin, 30 kW (40 hp) each
- Propellers: 3-bladed Duc, Arplast or Ecoprop, 1.60 m (5 ft 3 in) diameter ground adjustable pitch

Performance

- Maximum speed: 230 km/h (140 mph, 120 kn)
- Cruise speed: 200 km/h (120 mph, 110 kn)
- Stall speed: 58 km/h (36 mph, 31 kn)
- Never exceed speed: 290 km/h (180 mph, 160 kn)
- Range: 700 km (430 mi, 380 nmi)
- Rate of climb: 10 m/s (2,000 ft/min)
