= Wings of Freedom Phoenix 103 =

American light aircraft

Phoenix 103

General information
- Type: Amateur-built aircraft
- National origin: United States
- Manufacturer: Wings of Freedom
- Status: Production completed (2019)

History
- Developed from: Aero-Works Aerolite 103

The Wings of Freedom Phoenix 103 is an American amateur-built ultralight aircraft that was produced by Wings of Freedom of Hubbard, Ohio. When it was available it was supplied as a kit for amateur construction.

In late 2019 the company website had been taken down and it is likely that production had ended.

== Design and development ==
The Phoenix 103 is based on the discontinued Aero-Works Aerolite 103. With a standard empty weight of 254 lb (115 kg), it was designed to comply with the US FAR 103 Ultralight Vehicles rules, including the category's maximum empty weight of 254 lb (115 kg). It features a strut-braced high-wing, a single-seat open cockpit with windshield, fixed tricycle landing gear and a single engine in pusher configuration.

The aircraft is made from aluminum tubing, with its flying surfaces covered in Dacron sailcloth. Its 26.8 ft (8.2 m) span wing has an area of 124 sq ft (11.5 m^{2}). Its recommended engine power range is 28 to 50 hp (21 to 37 kW); standard engines used include the 50 hp (37 kW) two-stroke Hirth F-23. Construction time is estimated at 100 hours.

== Operational history ==
By December 2011, the manufacturer reported that ten of the aircraft had been completed and flown.

== Specifications (Phoenix 103) ==
Data from Kitplanes

General characteristics

- Crew: one
- Length: 17 ft (5.2 m)
- Wingspan: 26.8 ft (8.2 m)
- Wing area: 124 sq ft (11.5 m^{2})
- Empty weight: 254 lb (115 kg)
- Gross weight: 650 lb (295 kg)
- Fuel capacity: 5 U.S. gallons (19 L; 4.2 imp gal)
- Powerplant: 1 × Hirth F-23 twin cylinder, horizontally-opposed, two stroke aircraft engine, 50 hp (37 kW)
- Propellers: 3-bladed composite

Performance

- Cruise speed: 63 mph (101 km/h, 55 kn)
- Stall speed: 28 mph (45 km/h, 24 kn)
- Range: 100 mi (160 km, 87 nmi)
- Rate of climb: 1,100 ft/min (5.6 m/s)
- Wing loading: 5.2 lb/sq ft (25 kg/m^{2})
