= Fisher Avenger =

Canadian ultralight aircraft

Avenger
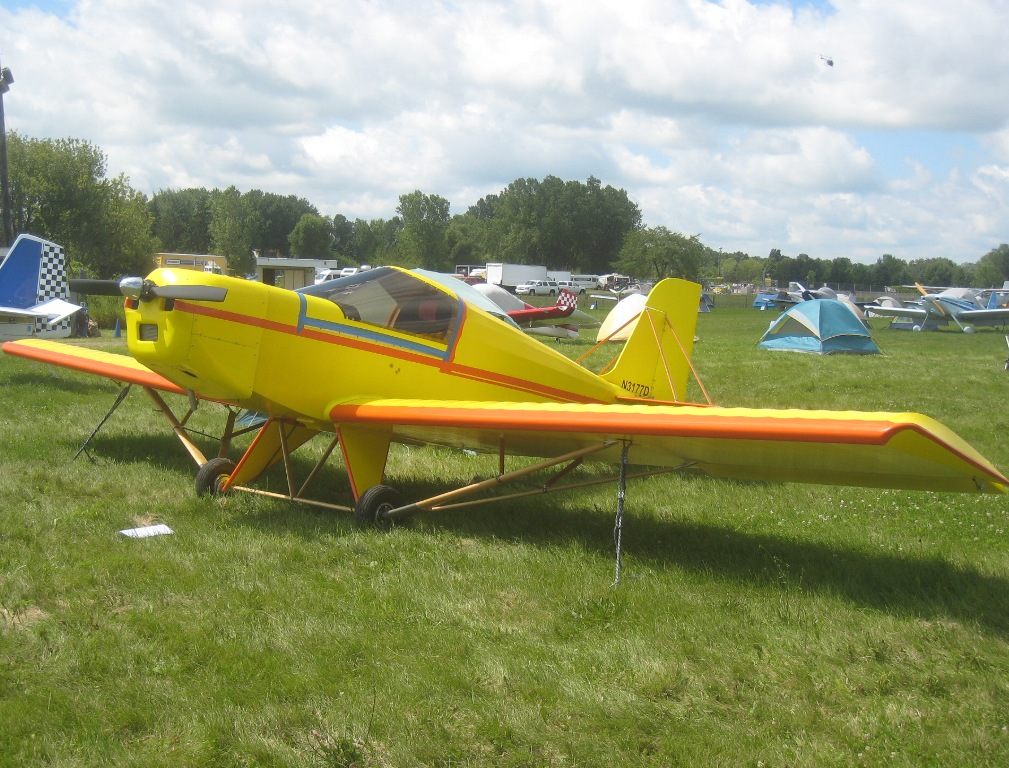

General information
- Type: Kit aircraft
- National origin: Canada
- Manufacturer: Fisher Flying Products
- Status: Kits in production
- Number built: 65 (December 2011)

History
- Introduction date: 1994
- First flight: 1994

The Avenger is a single-seat, Canadian low-wing, tractor configuration ultralight aircraft. The Avenger was introduced in 1994 and is available as a kit or as plans from Fisher Flying Products.

Fisher Flying Products was originally based in Edgeley, North Dakota, United States, but relocated to Vaughan, Ontario, Canada.

== Development ==
The Avenger was designed to meet the requirements of the United States FAR 103 Ultralight Vehicles regulations, including the maximum 254 lb (115 kg) empty weight. Design goals included low cost, an attractive appearance, and accommodation for a 76 in (193 cm) tall, 240 lb (109 kg) pilot.

Although originally designed to accept the Half VW powerplant (a Type 1 Volkswagen engine block cut in half), the aircraft empty weight can be reduced to 250 lb (113 kg) with the use of a lighter weight engine, such as the 28 hp (21 kW) Rotax 277 or the 35 hp (26 kW) 2SI 460-35. The Avenger was initially marketed with the now-discontinued Rotax 277 engine, which was criticized as leaving the aircraft dangerously underpowered.

Reviewer Andre Cliche says:

The Avenger is an experimental-class design that has been re-engined to fall under the ultralight regulations. For this purpose, a 28 hp Rotax 277 has been installed, thus allowing the weight to get lower than the 254 lbs. upper limit imposed on ultralights. This is technically feasible but the switch from a VW engine to a single cylinder Rotax also reduces the performance below a safe level. The rated 400 fpm rate of climb is barely adequate for safe operations. Put this machine in the wrong situation and it can bite you.

== Design ==
The Avenger structure is entirely constructed from wood, with a low wing braced to the landing gear. The wooden-framed wing is covered with aircraft fabric. The engine cowling is fibreglass. The conventional landing gear features a steerable tailwheel and main-gear suspension.

The cockpit has a removable canopy.

The Avenger has an estimated construction time of 400 hours from the kit.

In 2022 the kit price (without paint, varnish, pilot/passenger restraints, instruments, upholstery, or engine) was US$9320, with the plans selling for US$350.

Recommended engines include the 50 hp (37 kW) Rotax 503, 40 hp (30 kW) Rotax 447, 35 hp (26 kW) 2SI 460-35 or 38 hp (28 kW) 1/2 VW.

== Operational history ==
In December 2004, the company reported that 50 Avengers were flying, the majority as US unregistered ultralights.

== Variants ==
Avenger
With a regular firewall for two-stroke engines. Engine options are 40 hp (30 kW) Rotax 447, 50 hp (37 kW) Rotax 503, or 28 hp (21 kW) Hirth F-33 or 35 hp (26 kW) 2SI 460-35. Thirty-five had been completed and flown by the end of 2011.
Avenger V
With a 2" narrower firewall to accommodate VW engines. Engines include the 38 hp (28 kW) 1/2 VW and the 65 hp (48 kW) Volkswagen air-cooled engine. Thirty had been completed and flown by the end of 2011.

== Specifications (Avenger with Rotax 503) ==
Data from Cliche, KitPlanes and Fisher Flying Products

General characteristics

- Crew: one
- Length: 16 ft 3 in (4.96 m)
- Wingspan: 27 ft 0 in (8.24 m)
- Height: 5 ft 0 in (1.53 m)
- Wing area: 121 sq ft (11.25 m^{2})
- Empty weight: 280 lb (127 kg)
- Max takeoff weight: 600 lb (272 kg)
- Powerplant: 1 × Rotax 503 fixed pitch, 50 hp (37 kW)

Performance

- Maximum speed: 95 mph (154 km/h, 83 kn)
- Cruise speed: 80 mph (130 km/h, 70 kn)
- Stall speed: 28 mph (45 km/h, 24 kn)
- Rate of climb: 900 ft/min (4.6 m/s)
- Wing loading: 4.95 lb/sq ft (24.2 kg/m^{2})
- Power/mass: 12 lb/hp (0.11 kW/kg)

== See also ==
Aircraft of comparable role, configuration, and era

- Airdrome Eindecker E-III
- Ameri-Cana Eureka
- Fisher FP-303
- Hummel Bird
- Hummel CA-2
