= Hirth F-23 =

German two-stroke aircraft engine

- Type: Twin cylinder two-stroke aircraft engine
- National origin: Germany
- Manufacturer: Hirth

The Hirth F-23 is a twin-cylinder, horizontally-opposed, two-stroke, carburetted or optionally fuel injected aircraft engine designed for use on ultralight aircraft. It is manufactured by Hirth of Germany.

== Development ==
The F-23 is intended to compete with the 50 hp (37 kW) Rotax 503 and is differentiated from the Rotax powerplant by offering a horizontally opposed cylinder layout. The F-23 uses free air cooling and piston-ported induction, with dual Bing 34mm slide or optional diaphragm type carburetors. The cylinder walls are electrochemically coated with Nikasil. Standard starting is recoil start. A belt reduction drive system, fuel injection, tuned exhaust and electric start are optional.

The engine runs on a 50:1 pre-mix of unleaded 93 octane auto fuel and oil. Recommended time between overhauls is 1000 hours.

The F-23 produces 50 hp (37 kW) at 6150 rpm and 40 hp (30 kW) at 5500 rpm.

== Applications ==
- Aeronix Airelle
- Air Sports AIRector 120
- Aurore MB 02-2 Mini Bulle
- DAR-23
- Fisher FP-303
- Monnett Moni - motorglider
- Rotorschmiede VA115
- Sadler Vampire
- Solid Air Diamant LP
- Spacek SD-1 Minisport
- TechProAviation Merlin 100
- Team Mini-Max AeroMax
- TeST TST-1 Alpin
- Wings of Freedom Phoenix 103

== Specifications (F-23) ==
Data from Recreational Power Engineering

=== General characteristics ===
- Type: Twin-cylinder, two-stroke, aircraft engine
- Bore: 72 mm (2.8 in)
- Stroke: 64 mm (2.5 in)
- Displacement: 521 cc (31.8 cu in)
- Length: 247 mm (9.7 in)
- Width: 570 mm (22.4 in)
- Height: 338 mm (13.3 in)
- Dry weight: 84 lb (38.1 kg) including reduction unit, full exhaust system and electric start

=== Components ===
- Valvetrain: piston-ported
- Fuel system: 2 X Bing 34mm slide or optional diaphragm type carburetor or fuel injection
- Fuel type: unleaded 93 octane auto fuel
- Oil system: 50:1 fuel/oil premix
- Cooling system: free air
- Reduction gear: cog belt with 1.8:1, 2.2:1 and 2.5:1 ratios optional

=== Performance ===
- Power output: 50 hp (37 kW) at 6150 rpm
- Compression ratio: 9.5:1
