= Rotorschmiede VA115 =

German helicopter

General information
- Type: Helicopter
- National origin: Germany
- Manufacturer: Rotorschmiede GmbH
- Status: In production (2017)

History
- First flight: Summer 2015

The Rotorschmiede VA115 is a German helicopter, designed and produced by Rotorschmiede GmbH of Munich, introduced at the AERO Friedrichshafen airshow in 2015. The aircraft is supplied complete and ready-to-fly.

The aircraft first flew in the summer of 2015.

== Design and development ==
The VA115 was designed to comply with the US FAR 103 Ultralight Vehicles regulations, as well as the German 120 kg class and European Class 6 microlight helicopter rules. As its designation indicates, the aircraft has a standard empty weight of 115 kg (254 lb).

The VA115 features dual, coaxial main rotors with NACA 23012 airfoils, a single-seat open cockpit without a windshield, tricycle landing gear and a two-cylinder, air-cooled, two stroke, fuel-injected 50 hp (37 kW) Hirth F23 engine.

The aircraft fuselage is made from metal tubing, with a small cockpit fairing. Its dual two-bladed rotors each have diameters of 4.5 m (14.8 ft). The aircraft has a typical empty weight of 115 kg (254 lb) and a gross weight of 275 kg (606 lb), giving a useful load of 160 kg (353 lb). With full fuel of 19 litres (4.2 imp gal; 5.0 US gal) the payload for the pilot and baggage is 146 kg (322 lb).

Reviewer Werner Pfaendler, described the VA115 as "beautifully engineered".

== Specifications (VA115) ==
Data from Tacke and manufacturer

General characteristics

- Crew: one
- Length: 3.7 m (12 ft 2 in)
- Width: 1.6 m (5 ft 3 in)
- Height: 2.6 m (8 ft 6 in)
- Airfoil: NACA 23012
- Empty weight: 114 kg (251 lb)
- Gross weight: 275 kg (606 lb)
- Fuel capacity: 19 litres (4.2 imp gal; 5.0 US gal)
- Powerplant: 1 × Hirth F23 two cylinder, air-cooled, two stroke, fuel-injected aircraft engine, 37 kW (50 hp)
- Main rotor diameter: 2 × 4.5 m (14 ft 9 in)
- Main rotor area: 32 m^{2} (340 sq ft)

Performance

- Maximum speed: 130 km/h (81 mph, 70 kn)
- Cruise speed: 110 km/h (68 mph, 59 kn)
- Endurance: 4 hrs
- Disk loading: 8.6 kg/m^{2} (1.8 lb/sq ft)

== See also ==
- List of rotorcraft
