= Bautek Skycruiser =

German ultralight trike

Skycruiser

General information
- Type: Ultralight trike
- National origin: Germany
- Manufacturer: Bautek
- Status: In production (2013)

History
- Introduction date: 2009
- First flight: 2009

The Bautek Skycruiser is a German ultralight trike, designed and produced by Bautek of Kenn, Germany. The aircraft is supplied as a complete ready-to-fly-aircraft.

== Design and development ==
The Skycruiser was Bautek's first trike design and was designed to comply with the German 120 kg microlight category. The aircraft features a cable-braced hang glider-style high-wing, weight-shift controls, a single-seat open cockpit, tricycle landing gear with finned wheel pants and a single engine in pusher configuration.

The aircraft is made from bolted-together aluminum tubing, with its double surface wing covered in Dacron sailcloth. Its 9.5 m (31.2 ft) span Bautek Pico L wing is supported by a single tube-type kingpost and uses an "A" frame weight-shift control bar. The powerplant is a specially modified and tuned twin cylinder, air-cooled, four-stroke, 38 hp (28 kW) Briggs & Stratton Vanguard 1000 engine. This engine provides good fuel economy with a low noise level of 55 dB and produces a cruise speed of 90 km/h (56 mph).

The aircraft has an empty weight of 75 kg (165 lb) without the wing fitted and a gross weight of 238 kg (525 lb). The fuel tank holds 30 litres (6.6 imp gal; 7.9 US gal) of fuel.

The Skycruiser is German DULV certified.

== Specifications (Skycruiser) ==
Data from Bayerl

General characteristics

- Crew: one
- Wingspan: 9.5 m (31 ft 2 in)
- Wing area: 12.2 m^{2} (131 sq ft)
- Empty weight: 75 kg (165 lb) (carriage and engine only)
- Gross weight: 238 kg (525 lb)
- Fuel capacity: 30 litres (6.6 imp gal; 7.9 US gal)
- Powerplant: 1 × Briggs & Stratton Vanguard 1000 twin cylinder, air-cooled, four stroke aircraft engine, 28 kW (38 hp)
- Propellers: 3-bladed composite

Performance

- Maximum speed: 130 km/h (81 mph, 70 kn)
- Cruise speed: 90 km/h (56 mph, 49 kn)
- Stall speed: 43 km/h (27 mph, 23 kn)
- Rate of climb: 4 m/s (790 ft/min)
- Wing loading: 19.5 kg/m^{2} (4.0 lb/sq ft)
