= Dynon Avionics =

Aircraft manufacturer

- Genre: Avionics
- Founded: January 2000
- Headquarters: Woodinville, Washington, United States
- Area served: Worldwide
- Products: Avionics
- Number of employees: 50+
- Website: http://www.dynonavionics.com/

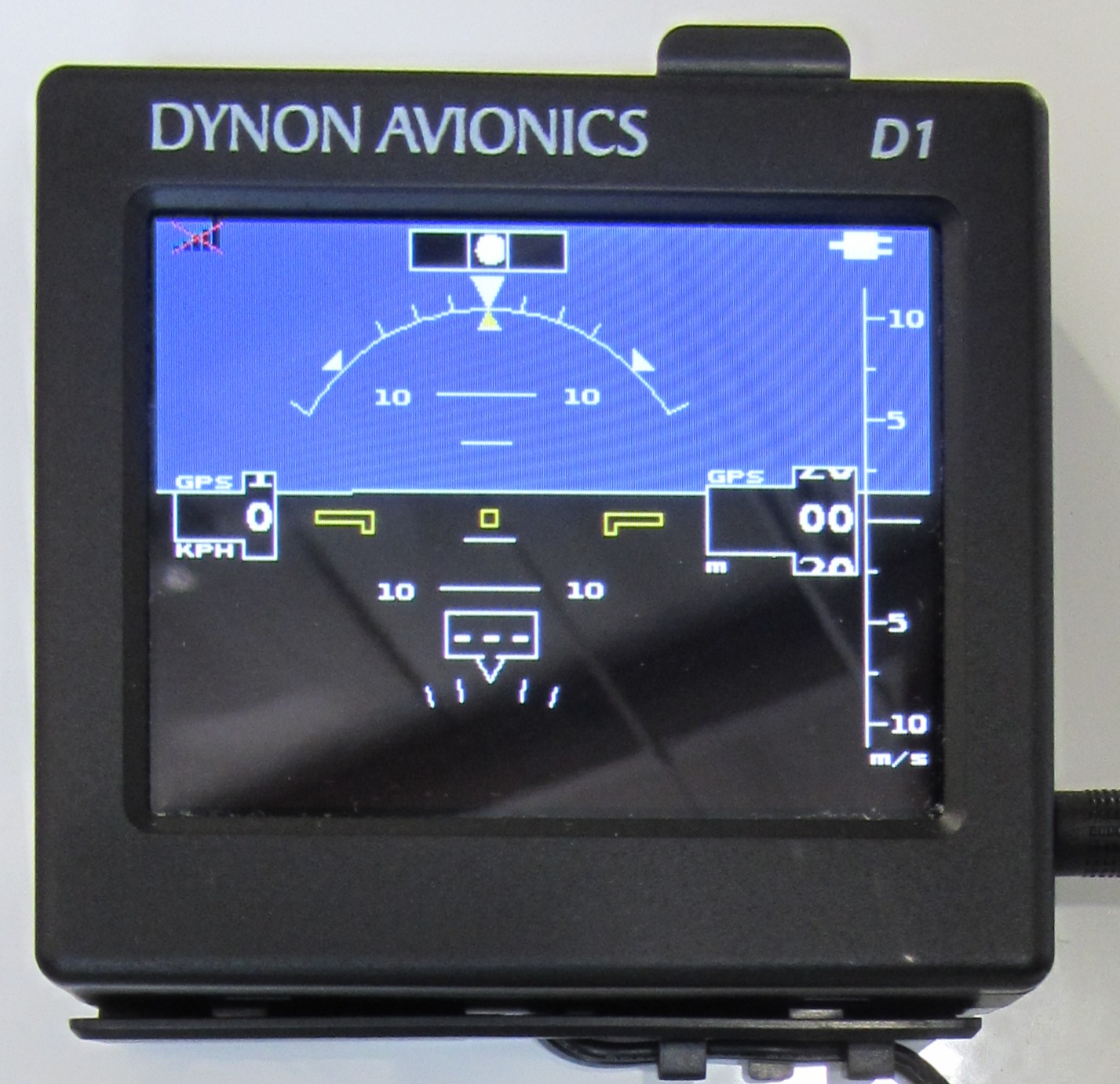
Dynon Avioncs D1 portable EFIS

Dynon Avionics is an American aircraft avionics manufacturer that specializes in non-certified electronic avionics.

Most of Dynon's instruments are not certified under FAA TSO specifications, and are developed for Experimental aircraft, Homebuilt aircraft, and Light Sport aircraft that include the avionics as part of their approved equipment during LSA certification. In the United States, aircraft of these types must operate under a Special Airworthiness Certificate.

In 2016 Dynon and the Experimental Aircraft Association gained Supplemental type certificate approval for the D10A EFIS in certain Piper and Cessna models.

== Products ==
Dynon Avionics SkyView Touch System

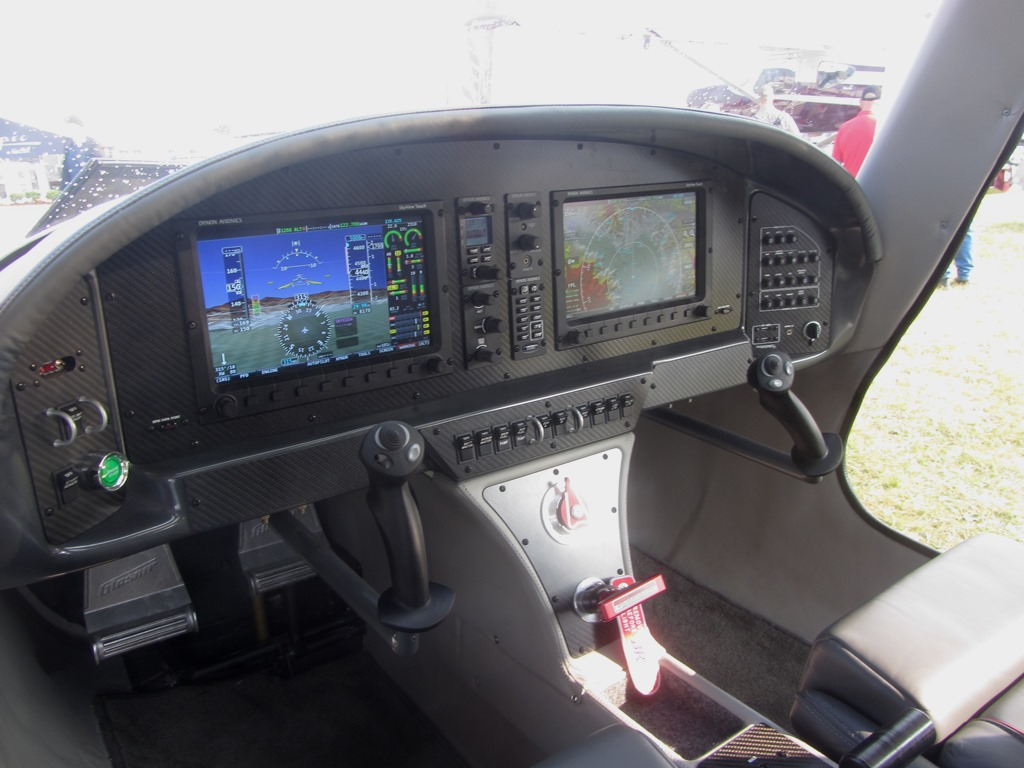
Dynon SkyView Touch installation in Merlin LSA

Dynon produces products such as the SkyView and SkyView Touch glass cockpit system (combination EFIS, EMS, and moving map with synthetic vision and touchscreen), the D6/D60/D10A/D100 EFIS, D10/D120 EMS, FlightDEK D180 (combination EFIS and EMS), as well as ADAHRS, autopilots, transponders, ADS-B receivers, COM Radios, Autopilot Control Panels, Knob Control Panels, and other aircraft equipment.

In 2012, Dynon released the D1 Pocket Panel, and subsequently an updated D2 Pocket Panel in 2013. The D1 & D2 are portable EFISs that include a true AHRS and are suitable for use in any aircraft (including certified aircraft) as long as they are not permanently installed.

One of the earliest installations of a Dynon D10 EFIS system was on the Space Ship One, the first private aircraft into outer space.
