= Hirth F-33 =

German two-stroke aircraft engine

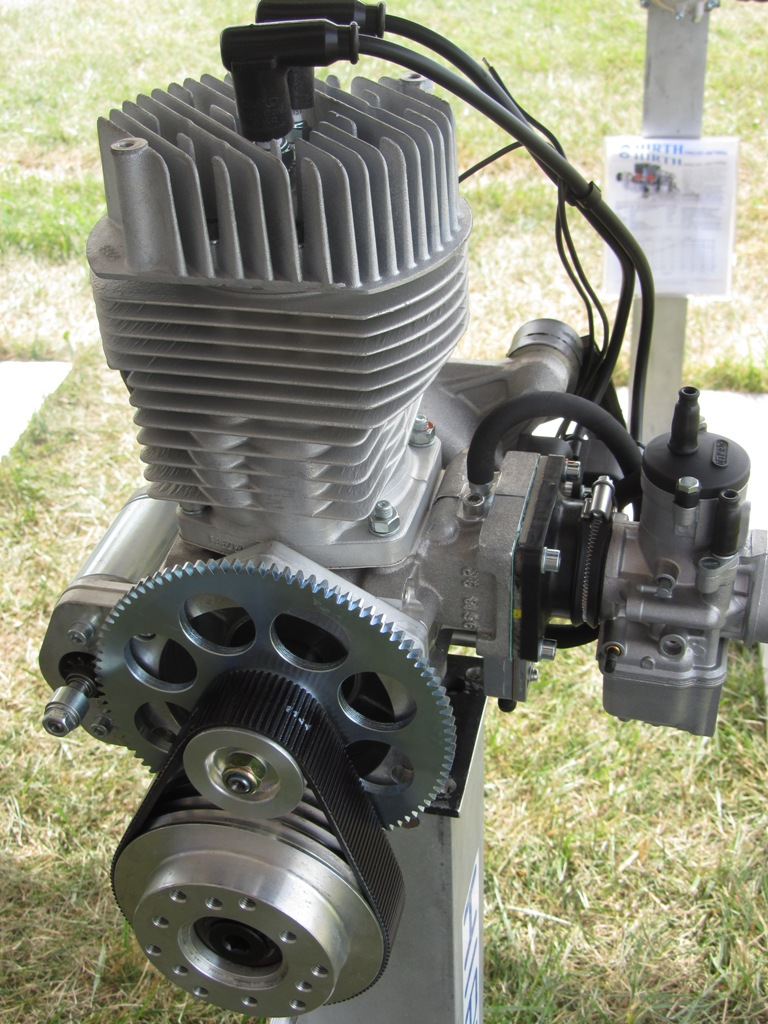
- Type: Single-cylinder two-stroke aircraft engine
- National origin: Germany
- Manufacturer: Hirth

The Hirth F-33 is a single-cylinder, two-stroke, carburetted aircraft engine designed for use on ultralight aircraft, including powered paragliders and ultralight trikes. The engine is noted for its extremely light base weight of 35 lb (16 kg). It is manufactured by Hirth of Germany.

== Development ==
The F-33 was intended to fill the niche previously occupied by the now out-of-production 28 hp (21 kW) Rotax 277. The F-33 uses free air cooling, dual capacitor discharge ignition and reed valve induction, with a single Bing 34mm slide or optional diaphragm type carburetor. The cylinder walls are electrochemically coated with Nikasil. Standard starting is recoil start. A belt reduction drive system, fuel injection, tuned exhaust and electric start are optional.

The engine runs on a 50:1 pre-mix of unleaded 93 octane auto fuel and oil. Recommended time between overhauls is 1000 hours.

The F-33 produces 22 hp (16 kW) at 5200 rpm and 28 hp (21 kW) at 6500 rpm.

== Applications ==
- Aerosport OY Spider
- Aerolite 103
- Alpaero Exel
- Ameri-Cana Eureka
- APEV Pouchel II
- Arey Tatush
- Av8er Explorer
- Belite Aircraft Superlite
- Büttner Crazy Flyer
- Büttner Crazy Plane
- DAR Solo
- Earthstar Gull 2000
- Escapade Kid
- Fisher Avenger
- Fisher FP-505 Skeeter
- Fisher FP-606 Sky Baby
- Fresh Breeze Airbass Monster
- Fresh Breeze Flyke
- Fresh Breeze Respect Monster
- Fresh Breeze Monster
- Ivanov ZJ-Viera
- JDT 1030F MAX-103
- JDT 1100F Mini-MAX
- Howland H-3 Pegasus
- Hummel CA-2
- M-Squared Breese XL
- Paladin Sparrow
- Phoenix Skywalker 330
- Pipistrel Apis-Bee
- PowerTrike Light
- Quad City Challenger
- Roll Flight MR V
- SDB Karat
- Silent Family Silent Glider M
- Spacek SD-1 Minisport
- Spartan BP Parawing
- Spartan DFS Paramotor
- Spartan DFS Trike
- Sperwill ST
- TeST TST-3 Alpin T
- Trio-Twister 103
- Wings of Freedom Flitplane
- Wood Sky Pup

== Specifications (F-33) ==
Data from Recreational Power Engineering

=== General characteristics ===
- Type: Single-cylinder, two-stroke, aircraft engine
- Bore: 76 mm (3.0 in)
- Stroke: 69 mm (2.7 in)
- Displacement: 313 cc (19.1 cu in)
- Length: 300 mm (11.8 in)
- Width: 299.5 mm (11.8 in)
- Height: 380 mm (15.0 in)
- Dry weight: 31 lb (14.1 kg) (base weight) 45 lb (20.4 kg) (with electric start and reduction drive)

=== Components ===
- Valvetrain: Reed valve, piston-ported
- Fuel system: 1 X Bing 34mm slide or optional diaphragm type carburetor or fuel injection
- Fuel type: Minimum of unleaded 93 octane auto fuel
- Oil system: 50:1 fuel-oil premix
- Cooling system: free air
- Reduction gear: four element cog belt

=== Performance ===
- Power output: 28 hp (21 kW) at 6500 rpm
- Compression ratio: 9.5:1
- Power-to-weight ratio: 0.8
