= Ameri-Cana Eureka =

Canadian ultralight aircraft

General information
- Type: Ultralight aircraft
- National origin: Canada
- Manufacturer: Ameri-Cana Ultralights
- Designer: Wilf Stark
- Status: Production completed July 2003

History
- Introduction date: 1997
- First flight: August 1997

The Ameri-Cana Eureka is a Canadian designed and built low-wing, single seat, conventional landing gear-equipped ultralight aircraft that was produced as a kit by Ameri-Cana Ultralights of Irricana, Alberta between 1997 and 2003.

== Development ==
Designer Wilf Stark conceived the Eureka as a US FAR 103 Ultralight Vehicles compliant aircraft. Stark identified that the US market lacked "an affordable Ultralight that is also easy to build".

Stark further noted: "Although there are ultralight kits available for about $4500-$6500 (prior to engine purchase), they often require building and fabrication times that can approach 600 to 1000 hours for first-time builders. This realistically translates into 2 or more years of building time that somehow has to be accommodated among other family obligations. It is a sad statistic that less than one-third of purchased airplane kits ever get completed by the original purchaser. They either quietly wither away in a corner, or they are sold at a fraction of their original price, to be completed by someone else."

Another aim of the design was to keep the complete purchase cost under US$6000 as the designer felt that this was the maximum figure that most builders could justify without causing marital discord.

As a result, he designed the Eureka to be both inexpensive and quick to construct from an assembly kit. The kit included pre-built wings, tail and fuselage that could be bolted together in about 20 hours of labour for the airframe, giving a total assembly time of two weekends.

The aircraft is constructed predominantly from foam, aluminum and wood with no aircraft fabric used in finishing. Each 12 ft (3.7 m) wing uses a deep spar, foam ribs and is covered in a single pre-painted white aluminum panel. The controls are conventional three-axis, with full-span ailerons and an all-flying rudder. The wings are not folding, but can be removed in five minutes to allow trailering the aircraft.

To keep costs and aircraft weight down, the recommended engines are the 25 hp (19 kW) Hirth F-33 engine and the Zenoah G-25 of 22 hp (16 kW).

The prototype Eureka first flew in August 1997.

In 1999, reviewer Andre Cliche said: "The kit sells for $6000, which is amazingly low when you consider that this number even includes the engine, propeller and basic instruments. I wonder if they will stay in business for long with such a low profit margin?"

After introduction, the price was increased to US$5000 for the airframe alone, estimating that it could be completed for US$8000 total. The company ceased providing kits in July 2003 stating "The Eureka has been withdrawn from the market due to lack of resources."

== Specifications (Eureka) ==
Data from Ameri-Cana

General characteristics

- Crew: one
- Capacity: 230 lb (104 kg); no passengers
- Length: 14 ft 6 in (4.42 m)
- Wingspan: 26 ft 0 in (7.93 m)
- Height: 5 ft 0 in (1.53 m)
- Wing area: 104 sq ft (9.67 m^{2})
- Empty weight: 230 lb (104 kg)
- Max takeoff weight: 460 lb (209 kg)
- Powerplant: 1 × Hirth F-33 fixed pitch, 25 hp (19 kW)

Performance

- Maximum speed: 63 mph (102 km/h, 55 kn)
- Cruise speed: 55 mph (89 km/h, 48 kn)
- Stall speed: 27 mph (44 km/h, 23 kn)
- Service ceiling: 10,000 ft (3,050 m)
- Rate of climb: 500 ft/min (2.5 m/s)
- Wing loading: 4.42 lb/sq ft (21.61 kg/m^{2})
- Power/mass: 18.4 lb/hp (0.091 kW/kg)

== See also ==
Aircraft of comparable role, configuration, and era

- Airdrome Eindecker E-III
- Fisher Avenger
- Fisher FP-303
- Hummel Bird
- Murphy JDM-8
