= Aero-Works Aerolite 103 =

American ultralight airplane

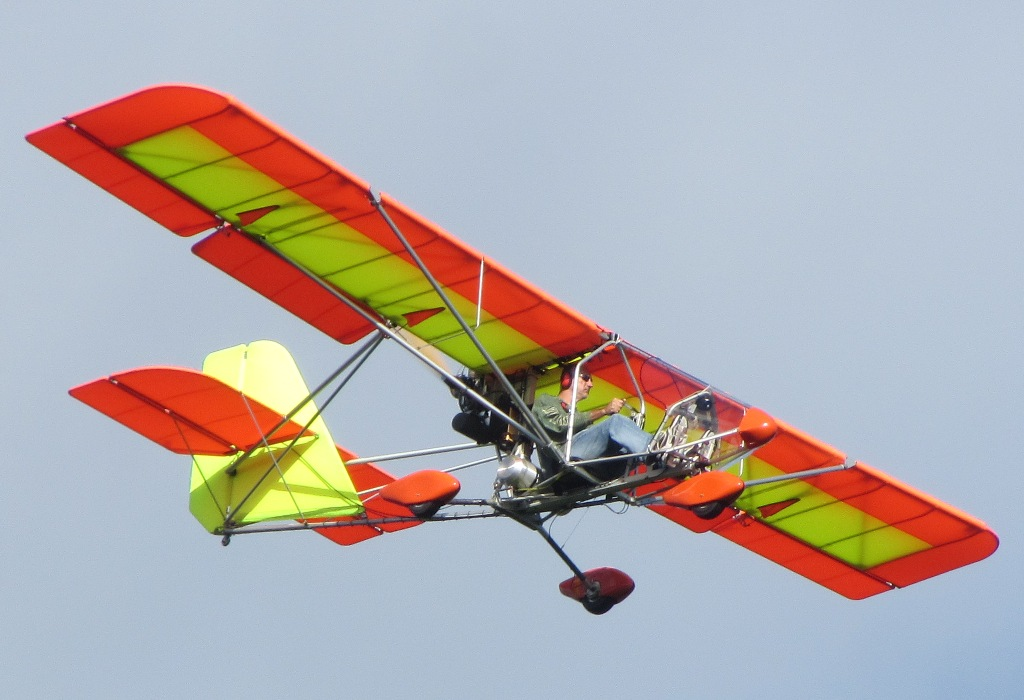

General information
- Type: Ultralight aircraft
- National origin: United States
- Manufacturer: Aero-Works Inc. U-Fly-It Light Sport Aircraft, LLC
- Designer: Terry Raber
- Status: 1997-2005; 2013-present
- Number built: 150 (December 2004)

History
- Introduction date: 1997
- First flight: October 1996
- Variant: Wings of Freedom Phoenix 103

The Aero-Works Aerolite 103 is an American single seat, high-wing, pusher configuration ultralight aircraft, designed by Terry Raber and introduced by Aero-Works, Inc, of Millersburg, Ohio, in 1997. The aircraft's model number indicates that it was designed to comply with the Federal Aviation Administration FAR 103 ultralight rules.

Production of the aircraft ended in 2005 when the manufacturer went out of business. The rights to the design were purchased by its original designer, the aircraft updated with an improved aluminum fuel tank and put back into production in 2013 by U-Fly-It Light Sport Aircraft, LLC of DeLand, Florida.

== Development ==
The aircraft was designed to meet the requirements of FAR 103 Ultralight Vehicles, including maximum 254 lb (115 kg) empty weight.

The builder-achieved empty weights vary from 252 lb (114 kg) to 300 lb (136 kg), with 275 lb (125 kg) being typical. To remain under the FAR 103 empty weight requires the use of a lightweight engine, such as the 35 hp (26 kW) 2si 460-F35 or the 28 hp (21 kW) Hirth F-33.

== Design ==
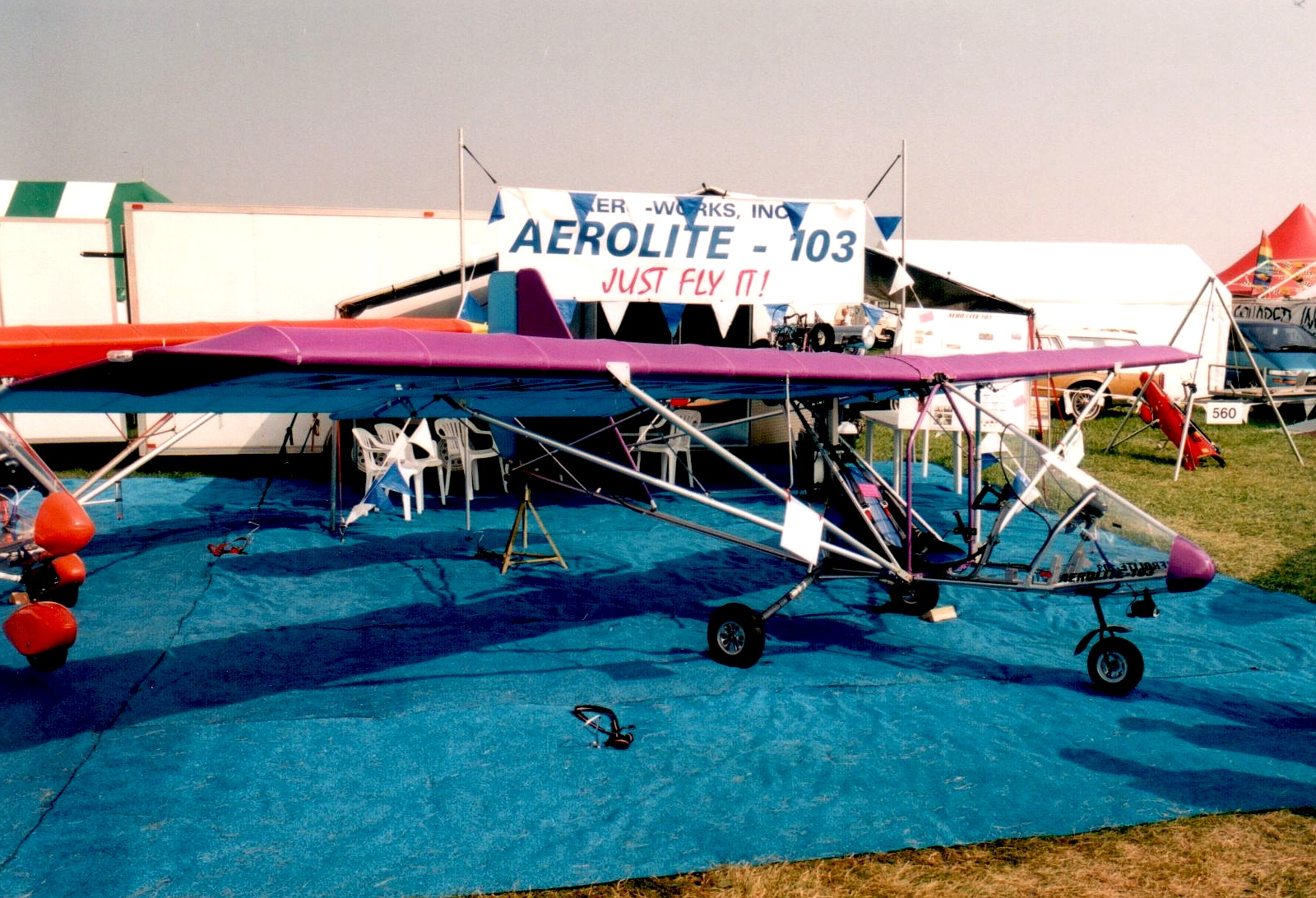
An Aerolite 103 at Oshkosh 2001

The Aerolite 103 features a high wing with half-span flaps that are extended by use of an overhead bellcrank to a maximum of 40 degrees. The flight controls are three-axis and are actuated by a wheel mounted on a control column via flexible push-pull cables and conventional rudder pedals connected to the rudder by cables. The engine throttle is a twistgrip type and incorporates a brake lever to operate the non-differential mechanical drum brakes installed on the main wheels of the tricycle landing gear.

The aircraft has conventional nose wheel steering connected to the rudder pedals. The main landing gear utilizes sprung-tubes for suspension and absorbing landing loads. There is a fourth small caster-wheel under the tail, because when the pilot's seat is unoccupied the aircraft rests on its tail, due to the aircraft's empty center of gravity.

The Aerolite 103 is sold as an assembly kit aircraft. The kit includes an illustrated assembly manual and pre-built fuselage, wings, control surfaces, jury struts and struts. The wings are covered by the builder with pre-sewn Dacron envelopes. The company estimates the time to complete the airframe at 60–80 hours. The kit does not include powerplant, propeller or instruments.

When the aircraft was first introduced, the standard engine was the 35 hp (26 kW) 2si 460-F35, with the 40 hp (30 kW) Rotax 447 optional. In 2009 the standard recommended engine was the Rotax 447, with the 46 hp (34 kW) Rotax 503 single carburettor engine optional. In 2021 an electric aircraft option was added as the manufacturer offered a complete electric drivetrain and up to four batteries as an alternative to gasoline powerplants.

Aerobatics and spins are prohibited.

== Operational history ==
Since its introduction the Aerolite 103 has won many awards, including:

- AirVenture 1997 - Grand Champion Ultralight
- Sun 'n Fun 1998 - Best Commercial Design
- AirVenture 1998 - Reserve Grand Champion Ultralight
- Sun 'n Fun 1999 - Grand Champion Ultralight
- AirVenture 1999 - Grand Champion Ultralight

In December 2004 the company reported that 150 aircraft were flying, the majority as unregistered US ultralights. In July 2009 there were 12 Aerolite 103s registered as experimental amateur-builts in the USA.

== Accidents ==
On 15 September 2019, former NASCAR driver Mike Stefanik was killed in the crash of an Aerolite 103 at Riconn Airport near Greene, Rhode Island.

== Specifications (Aerolite 103 with Rotax 447) ==
Data from Aerolite 103 website & KitPlanes

General characteristics

- Crew: one
- Length: 17 ft 0 in (5.19 m)
- Wingspan: 26 ft 10 in (8.18 m)
- Height: 6 ft 5 in (1.96 m)
- Wing area: 124 sq ft (11.54 m^{2})
- Empty weight: 275 lb (125 kg)
- Max takeoff weight: 600 lb (272 kg)
- Powerplant: 1 × Rotax 447 fixed pitch, 40 hp (30 kW)

Performance

- Maximum speed: 70 mph (113 km/h, 61 kn)
- Cruise speed: 63 mph (102 km/h, 55 kn)
- Stall speed: 35 mph (57 km/h, 30 kn)
- Never exceed speed: 75 mph (122 km/h, 65 kn)
- Range: 120 mi (194 km, 100 nmi)
- Rate of climb: 800 ft/min (4.1 m/s)
- Wing loading: 4.83 lb/sq ft (23.6 kg/m^{2})
- Power/mass: 15 lb/hp (0.11 kW/kg)

== See also ==
Aircraft of comparable role, configuration, and era

- Avid Champion
- Beaujon Enduro
- Birdman Chinook
- Chotia Gypsy
- Fisher FP-202 Koala
- Fisher FP-606 Sky Baby
- ISON Airbike
- Spectrum Beaver
- Titan Tornado
