= Airdrome Eindecker E-III =

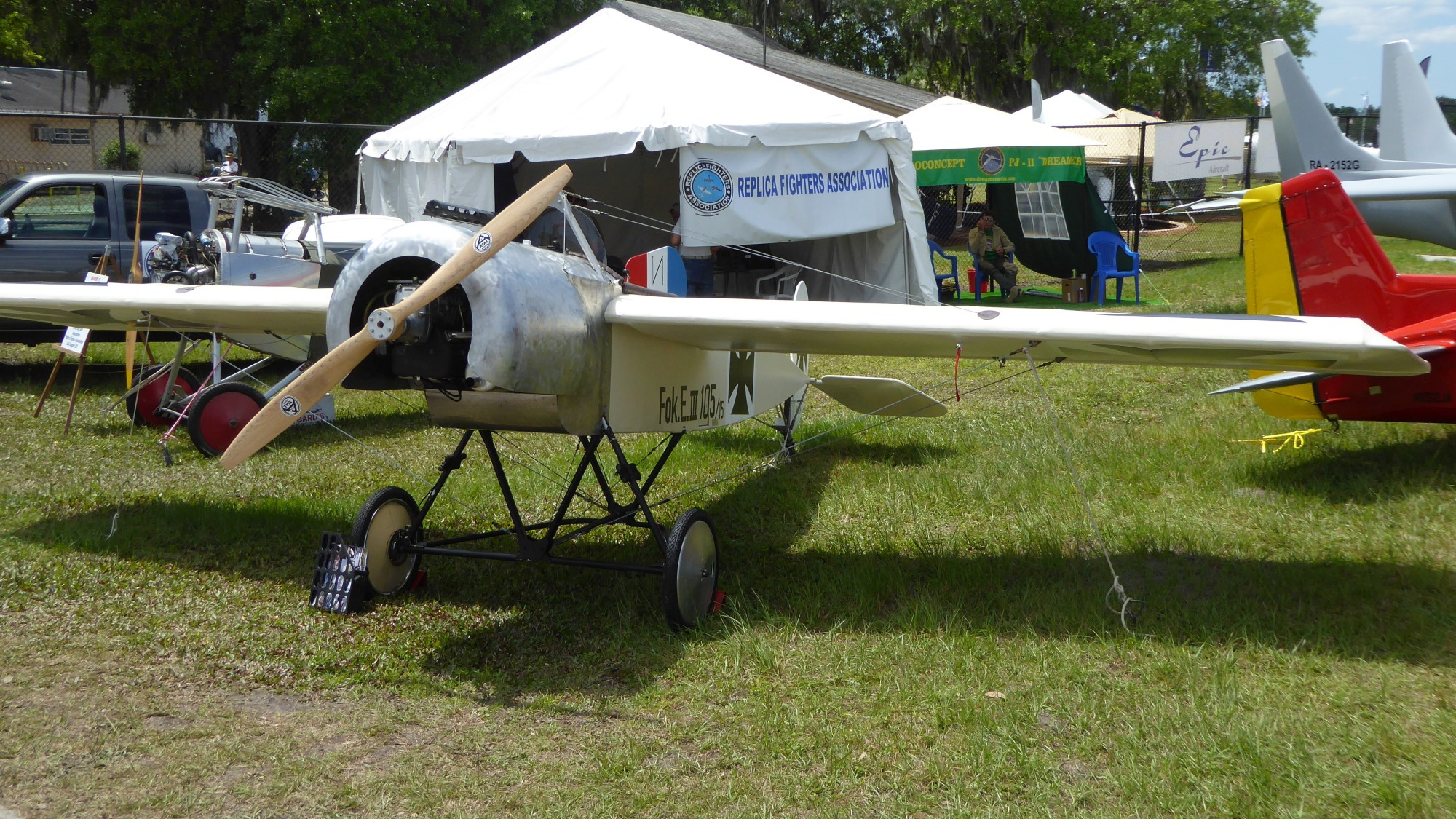

General information
- Type: World War I replica fighter
- National origin: United States
- Manufacturer: Airdrome Aeroplanes
- Designer: Robert Baslee
- Number built: 21 (2011)

History
- Developed from: Fokker E.III

The Airdrome Eindecker E-III is a single-seat, mid-wing, conventional landing gear fighter aircraft replica produced in kit form by Airdrome Aeroplanes of Holden, Missouri.

The Airdrome Eindecker E-III is a 3/4 scale replica of the First World War Fokker Eindecker E.III, the protagonist of the Fokker Scourge of the summer of 1915 when, equipped with a single synchronized Maxim machine gun, the Fokker E.III achieved air superiority over the western front.

== Development ==
The replica E-III was designed to give aircraft homebuilders the opportunity to construct a replica fighter and was intended to appeal to the pilot who is also a history buff. The aircraft fits into the US FAR 103 Ultralight Vehicles category and has a standard empty weight of 238 lb (108 kg) when equipped with the standard 50 hp (37 kW) Rotax 503 engine. Optionally a 38 hp (28 kW) half Volkswagen air-cooled engine can be used, putting the aircraft in the US Experimental - Amateur-built category. Several other engines in the power range 30–40 kW (40–54 hp) can be fitted, including the Solo Flight Solo 40, Rotax 447 and Hirth F23. Other engines fitted to aircraft on the UK register include the Warner Scarab 145 and the Continental C85-12.

The fuselage is constructed from pre-welded 4130 steel tube, along with aluminum tubing that is bolted and riveted together. The wing is conventional aluminum construction, wire braced from a short kingpost and the whole aircraft is covered with aircraft fabric. Unlike the original E-III, which utilized wing-warping, the replica has ailerons. The landing gear is bungee suspended. The engine cowling consists of a spun aluminum nose bowl with a sheet metal wrap-around.

The kits are supplied complete including paint and fabric, except for the engine, propeller and instruments. Of note, the kit does not include a replica machine gun. The factory estimates that an average builder can complete the aircraft kit in 300 hours.

The company claims that the aircraft kit can be assembled using "normal hand tools consisting of hacksaw, hand drill, file, pop rivet gun, wrenches, and hand nico press tool. Area required for construction should be approximate the size of a single car garage".

== Operational history ==
Twenty one examples had been completed by December 2011. Seven of these remained on the UK register in 2019.

== Specifications (E-III) ==
Data from Cliche, Aerocrafter, Kitplanes, Airdrome Aeroplanes

General characteristics

- Crew: one
- Capacity: 242 lb (110 kg) useful load, no passengers
- Length: 18 ft 0 in (5.49 m)
- Wingspan: 30 ft 0 in (9.15 m)
- Wing area: 96 sq ft (8.93 m^{2})
- Empty weight: 238 lb (108 kg)
- Max takeoff weight: 480 lb (218 kg)
- Powerplant: 1 × Rotax 503 two cylinder, two-stroke, 50 hp (37 kW)

Performance

- Maximum speed: 63 mph (102 km/h, 55 kn)
- Cruise speed: 57 mph (92 km/h, 50 kn)
- Stall speed: 28 mph (45 km/h, 24 kn)
- Range: 80 mi (130 km, 70 nmi)
- Rate of climb: 1,100 ft/min (5.6 m/s)
- Wing loading: 5.0 lb/sq ft (24.4 kg/m^{2})
- Power/mass: 9.6 lb/hp (0.24 kW/kg)

Armament

- Guns: 1 X replica Maxim machine gun (not supplied with kit)

== See also ==
Aircraft of comparable role, configuration, and era

- Pop's Props Pinocchio
