= Junkers K 47 =

German fighter

K 47 and A 48
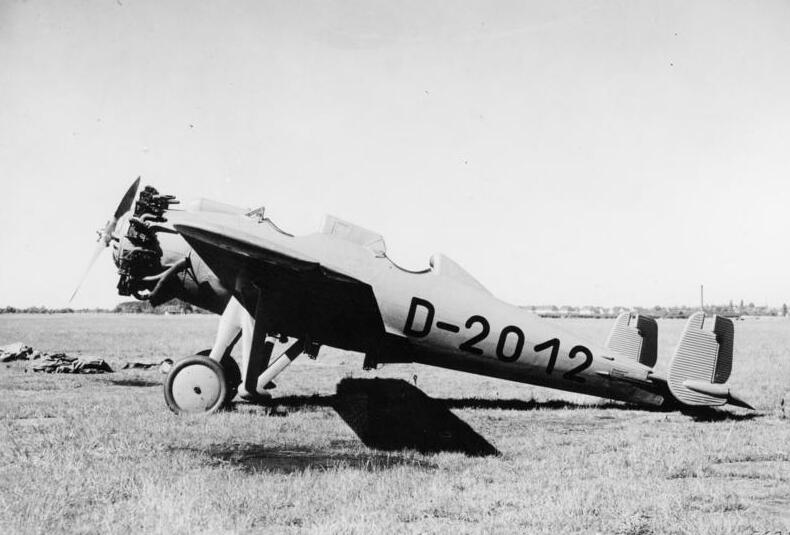
- Junkers A 48

General information
- Type: Fighter
- National origin: Germany
- Manufacturer: Junkers
- Designer: Karl Plauth and Hermann Pohlmann
- Primary user: China
- Number built: 23

History
- First flight: 15 September 1929

The Junkers K 47 was a two-seater fighter aircraft developed in Sweden by the Swedish subsidiary of the German firm Junkers during the late 1920s, a civil development of which was designated the A 48.

== Design and development ==
Designed to meet a requirement of the Turkish government for a new fighter, the K 47 was a strut-braced, low-wing monoplane of conventional design. Two open cockpits accommodated the pilot and tail-gunner, and the empennage was designed with twin vertical surfaces to maximise the rearward field of fire. The main units of the fixed, tailskid undercarriage shared part of the truss structure that braced the wings. The design was originally undertaken by Karl Plauth, but completed after his death by Hermann Pohlmann. The aircraft had to be built at first in Sweden, because it was patently a military-type aircraft and therefore banned in Germany according to the terms of the Versailles Treaty.

== Operational history ==
By the time the K 47 prototype was complete, Turkey had already lost interest in the type, but with the Soviet Union indicating interest, work continued. Eventually, however, the Soviet government only purchased two or three examples.

The only operational use of the type was China (Nanking government), which bought ten aircraft in 1931, and was presented one more in 1934 (the last one was named the T'ien C'hu No.1, after the factory, which had funded it). With the flare-up of the Shanghai Incident of 1932, the Chinese Air Force dispatched various fighter-attack planes to the Shanghai Hongqiao Aerodrome and the Hangzhou Qiaosi Airbase, while the Imperial Japanese Navy dispatched planes from aircraft carriers Hōshō and Kaga. A surprise attack by a 15-aircraft formation composed of Nakajima Type 3 fighters and Mitsubishi Type 13 attack-bombers saw a Chinese Junkers K 47 with pilot Shi Bangfan and his rear-seat gunner Shen Yanshi just managing to take off from Qiaosi as the Japanese raid commenced. Although gunner Shen's gun jammed, pilot Shi continued to dogfight the Japanese until he had to force-land his Junkers after he was shot and the engine damaged.

Demonstrations were also carried out in Romania, Portugal, and Latvia without any resulting orders, although one aircraft may have been purchased by Japan. Three aircraft were used by the Reichswehr clandestine training facility at Lipetsk and a small number of the unarmed civil version were purchased by the DVS.

K 47s were also used in trials to investigate dive bombing, experiments that would be formative of Pohlmann's thinking in designing the Ju 87. Indeed, the second Ju 87 prototype was fitted with a K 47 tail.

== Operators ==
Soviet Union

- Soviet Air Force - Two or three aircraft, used for tests and trials.

(Taiwan) Republic of China

- Chinese Nationalist Air Force - eleven used since 1931.

== Specifications (K 47) ==
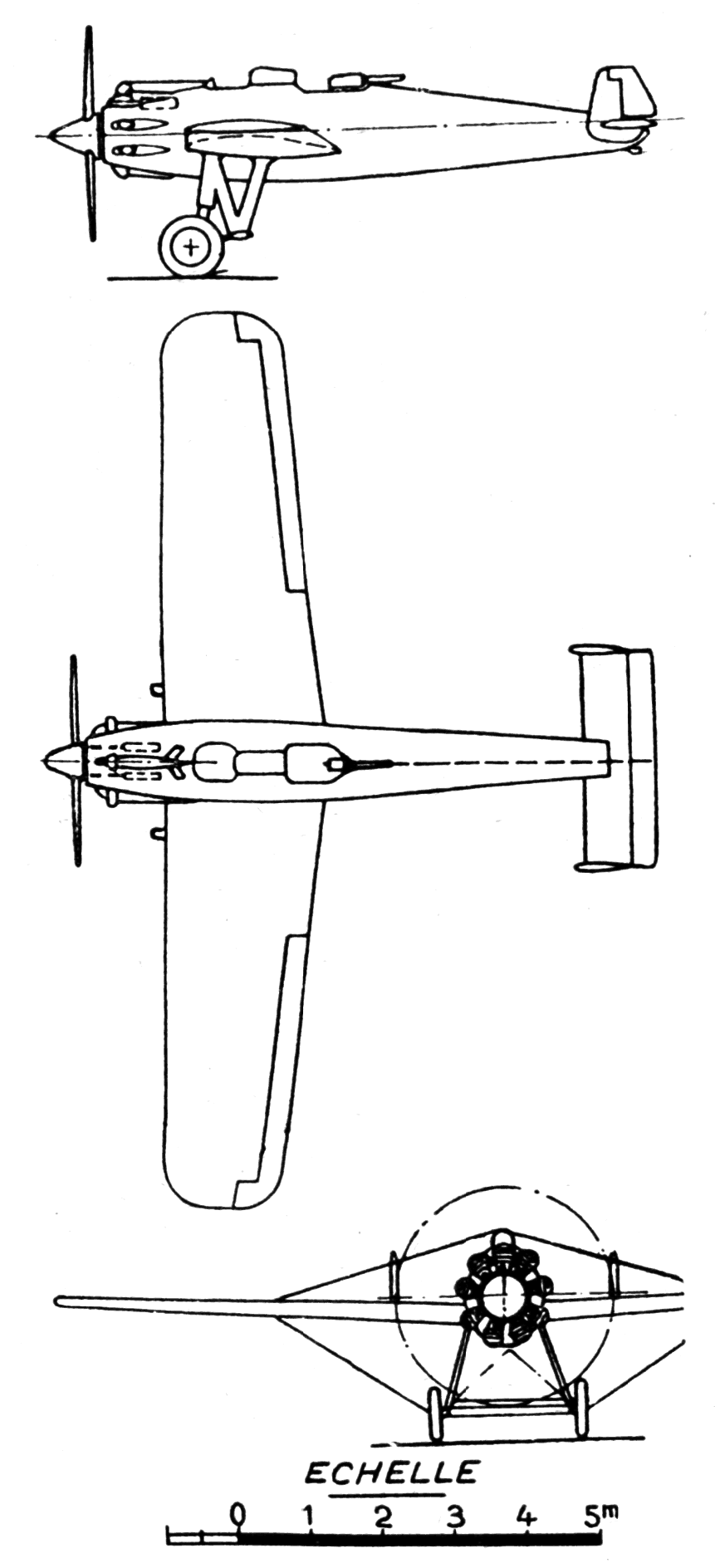
Junkers K 47 3-view drawing from L'Aérophile July,1929

Data from

General characteristics

- Crew: Two, pilot and gunner
- Length: 8.55 m (28 ft 1 in)
- Wingspan: 12.40 m (40 ft 1 in)
- Height: 2.40 m (7 ft 11 in)
- Wing area: 22.8 m^{2} (245 sq ft)
- Empty weight: 1,050 kg (2,310 lb)
- Gross weight: 1,635 kg (3,600 lb)
- Powerplant: 1 × BMW-built Pratt & Whitney Hornet , 440 kW (590 hp)

Performance

- Maximum speed: 300 km/h (190 mph, 170 kn)
- Range: 490 km (310 mi, 270 nmi)
- Service ceiling: 4,250 m (14,000 ft)

Armament

- 1 × fixed, forward-firing 7.92 mm (.312 in) LMG 08/15 machine gun
- 1 × trainable, rearward-firing 7.92 mm (.312 in) machine gun
- 2 × 50 kg bombs under wings

== Bibliography ==
- Andersson, Lennart. "Chinese 'Junks': Junkers Aircraft Exports to China 1925-1940". Air Enthusiast, No. 55, Autumn 1994, pp. 2–7. ISSN 0143-5450
- Andersson, Lennart (March–May 1992). "Junker's Two-seaters, Part Two". Air Enthusiast. No. 45. pp. 36–43. ISSN 0143-5450.
- Taylor, Michael J. H. (1989). Jane's Encyclopedia of Aviation. London: Studio Editions. p. 546.
