= Shi Bangfan =

Chinese fighter pilot and politician (1901–1984)

- 石邦藩
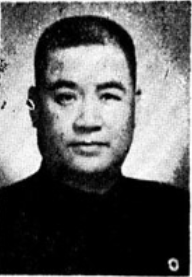
- Shi c. 1947
- Born: 12 August 1901; Zhaiyang Township, Hunan, Qing China
- Died: 1984 (aged 82–83); United States
- Military career
- Allegiance: Republic of China
- Branch: Republic of China Air Force
- Service years: 1921–1949
- Rank: Colonel
- Conflicts: Second Sino-Japanese War; January 28 incident

Shi Bangfan (Chinese: 石邦藩; 12 August 1901 – 1984) was a Chinese fighter pilot in the Republic of China Air Force.

== Early life ==
Of Miao ethnicity, Shi Bangfan was born in 1901 in Zhaiyang Township, Hunan, China. He attended Qiancheng Higher Primary School. He graduated from the Military Officer Training Corps in 1921 and was appointed to the Army Infantry School in February 1924. Around April 1924, he entered the Baoding Aviation School, which was under the control of the Zhili clique. In March 1925, the personnel and equipment of the aviation school were moved to Luoyang.

== Military career ==
After graduating in the fall of 1925, he was attached to the 3rd Army Air Corps. Shi remained in Luoyang as the adjutant general. In March 1926, when Feng Yuxiang resigned and Sun Yue fell ill, the Zhili clique regained power and the 3rd Army Air Corps was taken over by Wu Peifu. In June of the same year, when the Anti-Bandit Alliance Air Command was established in Baoding, he became a company commander of the 1st Air Corps. After the air force of Wu Peifu's army was annihilated during the Northern Expedition, he took refuge in Zhang Zongchang's army and served as a pilot in the Flying Leopard Unit off the Zhili Alliance Air Command. On 24 March 1927, when the National Revolutionary Army unit commanded by Cheng Qian seized control of Nanjing, Shi defected to the Kuomintang and became deputy commander of Cheng's army's air corps.

In February 1928, with the establishment of the Military Commission's Aviation Command, he was assigned to the Second Aviation Corps of the National Revolutionary Army. In November of the following year, he was promoted to deputy commander of the Second Corps. On 20 October 1930, he became a lieutenant colonel. After the end of the Central Plains War, he led part of the Second Corps to advance to Nanchang in preparation for battle against Chinese Communists. He later was assigned to the Second Central Air Force in Nanjing and Hangzhou.

=== Second Sino-Japanese war ===
On 26 February 1932, following the flare-up of the January 28 Incident in Shanghai, the Imperial Japanese Navy launched aircraft from the carriers Hōshō and Kaga. A sudden assault by a 15-plane Japanese formation, consisting of Nakajima Type 3 fighters and Mitsubishi Type 13 attack-bombers, targeted Qiaosi Airbase in Hangzhou, targeting the Central Aviation School and 32 Chinese aircraft stationed there. Shi, alongside his rear-seat gunner Shen Yanshi, barely managed to get their Junkers K 47 airborne as the raid began. Despite being heavily outnumbered, Shi disrupted the Japanese formation and shot down one Japanese plane, causing the formation to retreat. This made Shi the first Chinese pilot to down a Japanese plane. Another formation of nine Japanese fighter planes attacked and despite Shen's gun jamming, Shi engaged the Japanese in a dogfight, continuing until he was wounded and the aircraft's engine was hit, forcing him to make an emergency landing. During the battle, Shi's aircraft sustained 68 bullet hits, and he was severely wounded in the left arm by an expanding bullet from the Japanese plane, resulting in a shattered elbow. He managed to damage two more Japanese aircraft during the dogfight, thwarting the Japanese attempt to destroy the airfield and aviation school. The Chinese lost six planes and five pilots killed while Japanese lost four planes and four pilots killed.

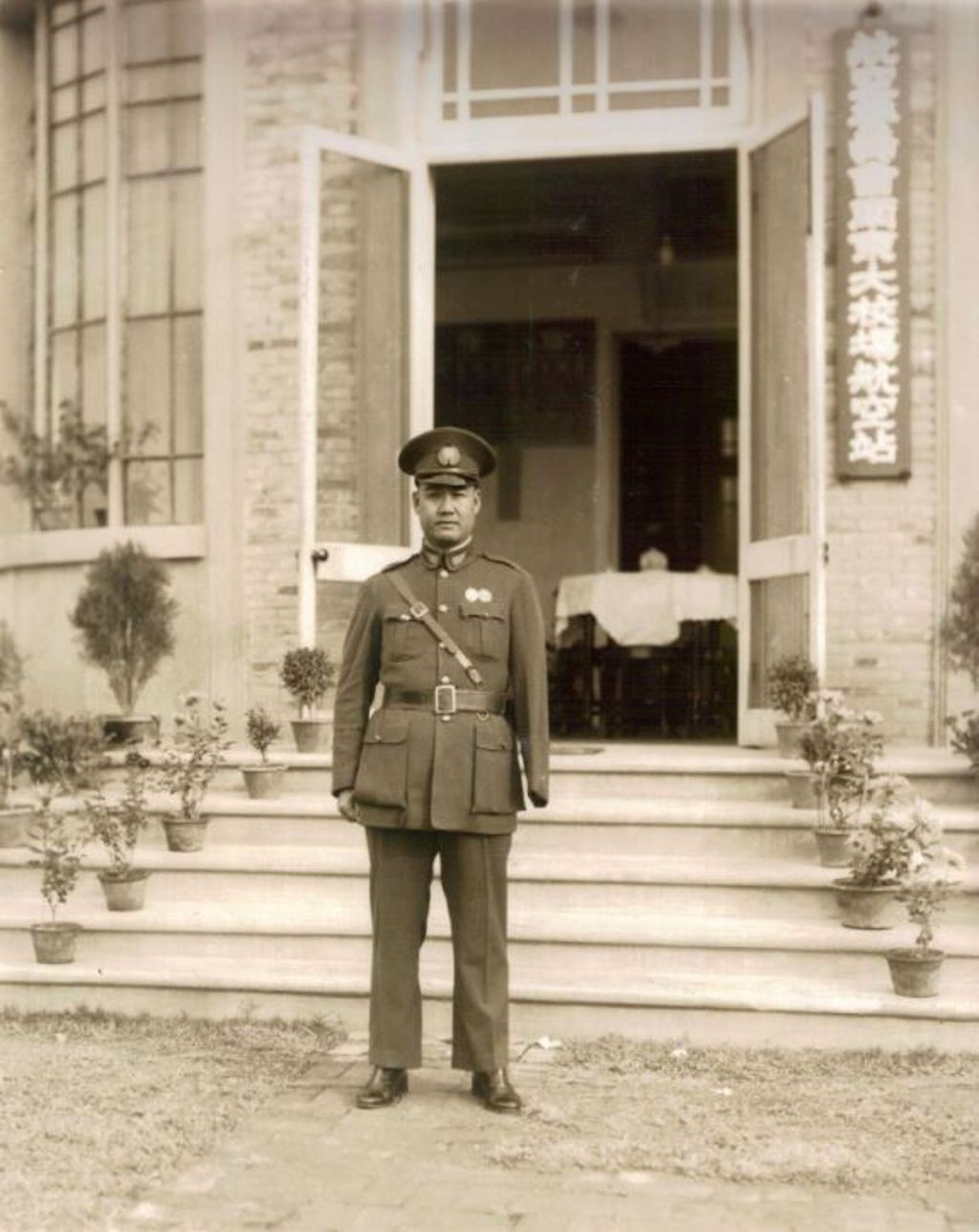
Shi Bangfan in 1937

Due to the severity of his injury, Shi's left arm was amputated at the elbow. After recovery, he was personally commended by the Nationalist leader Chiang Kai-shek. In recognition of his valor, a Shanghai tobacco company produced "Bangfan" brand cigarettes, which became popular at the time.

Following the outbreak of the Second Sino-Japanese War on 7 July 1937, Shi was appointed station chief of the Air Force General Station under the Air Force Frontline Command. In August 1937, he became Chief of Staff for the First Military District Air Force Command, overseeing nine squadrons, five independent provisional squadrons, and one provisional instructor squadron. In 1940, he was appointed Director of the Transportation Department of the Aviation Committee.

== Later life ==
Following the end of World War II, in December 1945, he was elected acting district chief of the Shanghai Tenth District Office and the following year, he was elected a Shanghai municipal councillor.

In 1949, Shi relocated to Taiwan with the Nationalist government and left military service. After moving to Taiwan, he served as Director and deputy director of the Taichung Office of the Taiwan Provincial Materiel Administration. In 1962, General Chen Jia-shang, Commander-in-Chief of the Republic of China Air Force, awarded Shi an Honor Star Medal and an Injury Honor Medal in recognition of his combat achievements. After retiring from civilian service in March 1968, he immigrated to the United States with his family, where he died in 1984.

== Personal life ==
Shi's youngest son Shi Dong is a Chinese American talk show host. His other son, Shi Jiaxiao, serves as the head of the Republic of China Veterans Association in Boston.

== Bibliography ==
- Li, Tianmin (1973). Zhōngguó hángkōng zhǎnggù 中華民國史大事記 [Chinese Aviation Stories] (in Chinese). Zhōngguó de kōngjūn chūbǎn shè.
- Ma, Yufu (1994). 1908-1949 Zhōngguó jūnshì hángkōng 1908-1949中国军事航空 [1908-1949 Chinese Military Aviation]. Hángkōng gōngyè chūbǎn shè.
- Nakayama, Masahiro (2007). "Chūgoku-teki tenkū (ue) chinmoku no kōkū senshi" ["China's Sky (Part 1) A Silent History of Air Warfare"] (in Japanese). Dai Nippon Kaiga. ISBN 9784499229449.
