= Airflow Twinbee =

Belgian ultralight aircraft

Twinbee

General information
- Type: Ultralight aircraft
- National origin: Belgium
- Manufacturer: Airflow S.P.R.L.
- Status: In production

History
- Introduction date: 2010

The Airflow Twinbee is a Belgian ultralight aircraft, designed and produced by Airflow S.P.R.L., of Brussels and introduced at the Aero show held in Friedrichshafen in 2010. The aircraft is supplied as a kit for amateur construction or as a complete ready-to-fly-aircraft.

== Design and development ==
The aircraft was designed to comply with the Fédération Aéronautique Internationale microlight rules. It features a strut-braced high-wing, a two-seats-in-side-by-side configuration enclosed cockpit, fixed tricycle landing gear and a single engine in tractor configuration.

The aircraft fuselage is made from welded stainless steel tubing covered with a composite skin. The tail boom is a single aluminium tube. The 9.33 m (30.6 ft) span wing is made from aluminum sheet and features Junkers-style ailerons. The wings can be folded for ground transportation or storage. Standard engines available are the 85 hp (63 kW) Verner 133M and the 80 hp (60 kW) Rotax 912UL four-stroke powerplant.

== Specifications (Twinbee) ==
Data from Bayerl and manufacturer

General characteristics

- Crew: one
- Capacity: one passenger
- Length: 6.4 m (21 ft)
- Wingspan: 9.33 m (30 ft 7 in)
- Height: 2.20 m (7.21 ft)
- Wing area: 14.2 m^{2} (153 sq ft)
- Empty weight: 260 kg (573 lb)
- Gross weight: 450 kg (992 lb)
- Fuel capacity: 80 litres (18 imp gal; 21 US gal)
- Powerplant: 1 × Verner 133M twin cylinder, horizontally-opposed air-cooled, four stroke, 63 kW (85 hp)

Performance

- Maximum speed: 153 km/h (95 mph, 83 kn)
- Cruise speed: 132 km/h (82 mph, 71 kn)
- Stall speed: 50 km/h (31 mph, 27 kn)
- Never exceed speed: 180 km/h (112 mph, 97 kn)
- g limits: +6/-3
- Maximum glide ratio: 10:1
- Rate of climb: 5 m/s (980 ft/min)
- Wing loading: 31.7 kg/m^{2} (6.5 lb/sq ft)
