= Airkraft Sunny =

Swiss ultralight aircraft

Sunny
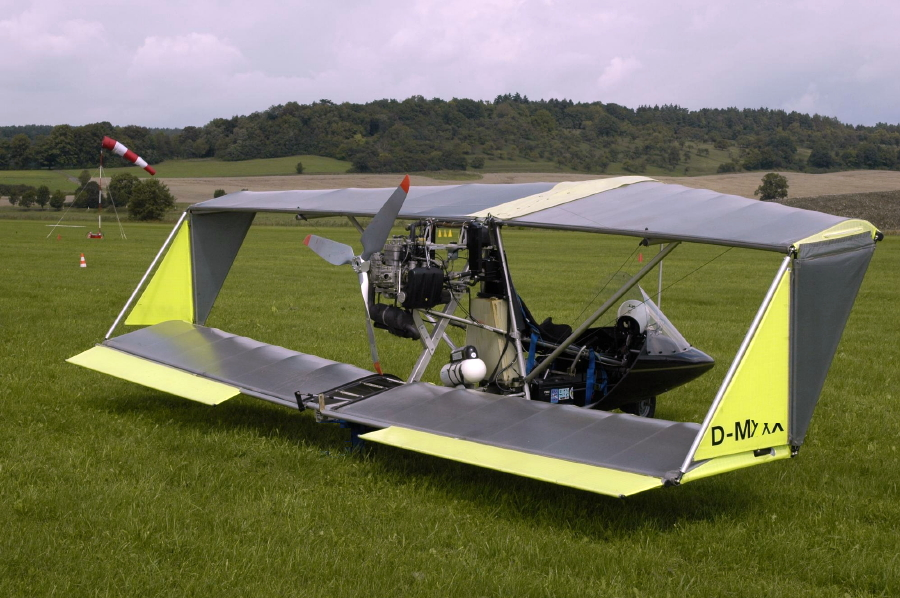
- Sunny Sport

General information
- Type: Ultralight aircraft
- National origin: Switzerland
- Manufacturer: Tandem Aircraft KG; Dewald Leichtflugzeugbau Gmbh; Airkraft Gmbh Leichtflugzeugbau
- Designer: Dieter Schulz
- Status: Production completed
- Number built: 250

The Airkraft Sunny is an ultralight aircraft that was designed by Dieter Schulz. The aircraft was initially produced by his company, Tandem Aircraft KG of Saulgau, Germany, which built about 150 examples between 1989 and 1999. After he sold the rights in 1999, it was then produced by Dewald Leichtflugzeugbau Gmbh of Bad Schönborn, Germany and more recently by Airkraft Gmbh Leichtflugzeugbau of Beringen, Switzerland, who seem to have gone out of business in about 2010 and production ended. Originally supplied ready-to-fly, later the aircraft was supplied as a kit for amateur construction or as a complete ready-to-fly-aircraft.

== Design and development ==
The aircraft complies with the Fédération Aéronautique Internationale microlight category rules. It features an unusual diamond-shaped biplane, strut-braced closed wing layout, a two-seats-in-tandem enclosed or open cockpit, fixed tricycle landing gear and a single engine in pusher configuration. The upper wing is swept back, while the lower wing is straight, but mounted further aft. The two wings are joined by swept tip rudders. The elevons are mounted to the lower wing only.

The aircraft is made from bolted-together aluminium tubing, with its flying surfaces covered in Dacron sailcloth. Standard engines available include many models of Hirth, Rotax, BMW and Verner 133M powerplants, ranging from 65 to 80 hp (48 to 60 kW).

== Variants ==
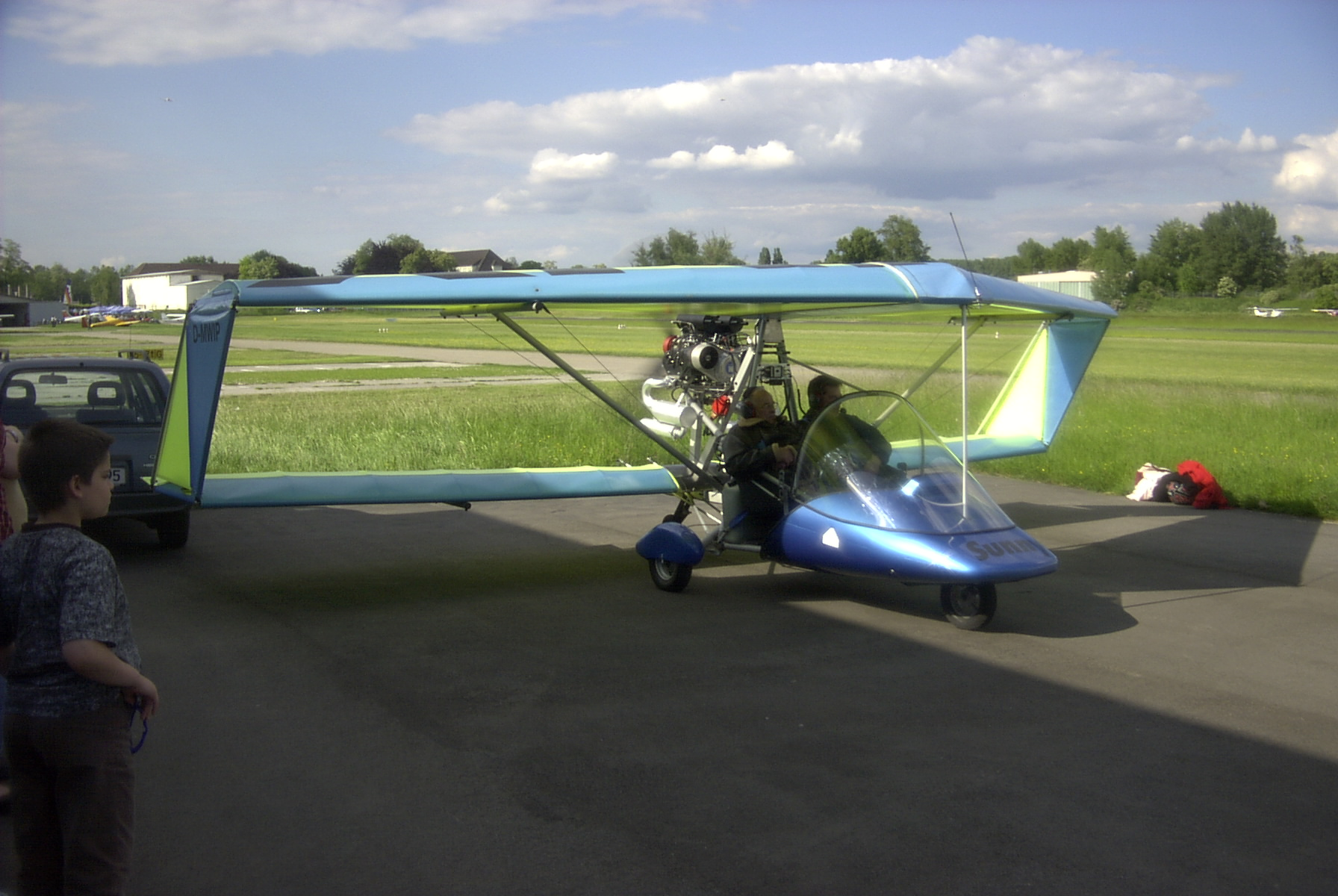
Sunny side-by-side

Sunny Light
Version with open cockpit
Sunny Sport
Two seat tandem version with enclosed or semi-enclosed cockpit
Sunny Side-By-Side
Version with side-by-side configuration seats
Sunny Targa
Fully enclosed version.
Sunny Amphibian
Version with amphibious floats

== Specifications (Sunny Light) ==
Data from Bayerl

General characteristics

- Crew: one
- Capacity: one passenger
- Wingspan: 7 m (23 ft 0 in)
- Wing area: 17 m^{2} (180 sq ft)
- Empty weight: 220 kg (485 lb)
- Gross weight: 450 kg (992 lb)
- Fuel capacity: 44 litres (9.7 imp gal; 12 US gal) or optionally 80 litres (18 imp gal; 21 US gal)
- Powerplant: 1 × Rotax 582 twin cylinder, liquid-cooled, two stroke, 48 kW (64 hp)

Performance

- Maximum speed: 145 km/h (90 mph, 78 kn)
- Cruise speed: 100 km/h (62 mph, 54 kn)
- Stall speed: 55 km/h (34 mph, 30 kn)
- Rate of climb: 4 m/s (790 ft/min)
