= Gloster Gamecock =

British biplane fighter

Gamecock
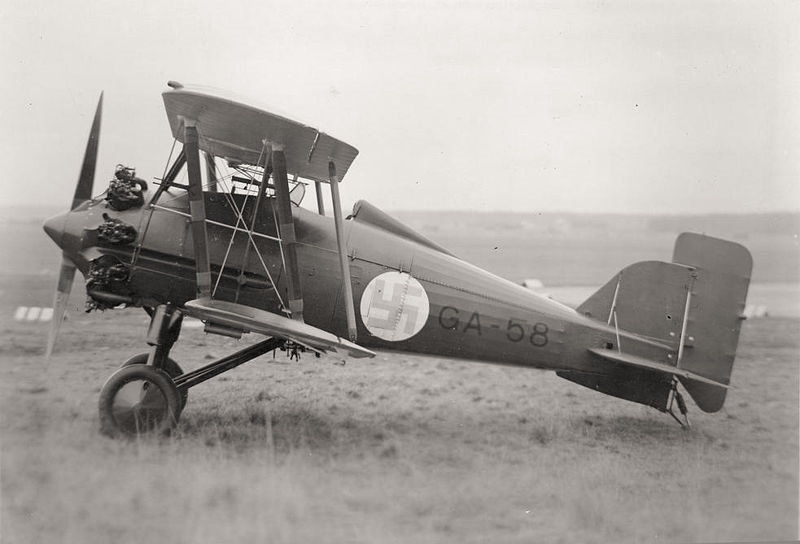
- Gloster Gamecock operated by the Finnish Air Force

General information
- Type: Fighter aircraft
- National origin: United Kingdom
- Manufacturer: Gloster
- Status: Retired from service
- Primary users: Royal Air Force Finnish Air Force
- Number built: 108

History
- First flight: 22 February 1925
- Developed from: Gloster Grebe
- Variant: Nakajima A1N

The Gloster Gamecock was a biplane fighter designed and produced by the British aircraft manufacturer Gloster.

The Gamecock was a development of the earlier Grebe Mk III, an early interwar fighter procured by the Royal Air Force (RAF). Work on the type commenced in 1924 as a response to Air Ministry Specification 37/23. The principal difference between the two aircraft was the adoption of the Bristol Jupiter radial engine for the Gamecock in place of the somewhat unreliable Armstrong Siddeley Jaguar. Various structural improvements were made to the fuselage, the armament was also revised to include internally-mounted machine guns. The prototype Gamecock performed its maiden flight on 22 February 1925.

Evaluation flights at RAF Martlesham Heath resulted in considerable praise for the aircraft; few changes were made as a result. During September 1925, the Air Ministry placed an initial order for 30 production aircraft to fulfil Specification 18/25. Further orders would quickly follow; the first production Gamecock flew in March 1926 and was delivered two months later. While the type was often praised for its manoeuvrability and speed, it had a high accident rate in service, leading to a relatively brief flying career with the RAF. The aircraft served considerably longer with the Finnish Air Force; it was produced under licence for the service under the local name Kukko and saw action during the Winter War of 1939–1940 against the Soviet Union.

== Development ==
The origins of the Gamecock can be found in the earlier Gloster Grebe. During the mid-1920s, this fighter had proven itself to be relatively popular amongst the pilots of the Royal Air Force (RAF), which typically praised it for its high maximum speed for the era and its manoeuvrability. It was recognised that the Grebe also had some shortcomings, even in its later models. A prominent failing was the unsatisfactory performance of the Armstrong Siddeley Jaguar engine, which had developed a reputation with ground crews for its poor reliability as well as being difficult to service. Gloster became keenly interested in the replacement of the Jaguar with another engine and took an interest in the promising Bristol Jupiter radial engine that could deliver similar performance to the Jaguar while lighter and considerably less complex.

During the summer of 1924, the Air Ministry issued Specification 37/23, which was tailored around the development of a Jupiter-powered version of the Grebe. Gloster commenced work on the project immediately thereafter. Gloster's design team, headed by Henry Folland, had also identified numerous improvements that could be made, typically relating to the aircraft's structure. The fuselage was composed almost completely out of wood, although steel tie-rods were used for internal bracing, as well as a combination of aluminium and asbestos for a fireproof bulkhead at the back of the engine bay. One of the more distinctive changes on the new aircraft was the adoption of internally-mounted machine guns in place of the Grebe's external armament arrangement along the top of the fuselage.

Less than six months after the specification, Gloster had completed construction of the prototype, J7497, which was fitted with the Jupiter IV engine; by this time, orders for a further two prototypes had been ordered. On 20 February 1925, it was delivered to RAF Martlesham Heath to commence a comprehensive evaluation; its maiden flight was performed two days later. Within weeks of its arrival, the prototype's Grebe-style unbalanced rudder was replaced by a redesigned horn-balanced counterpart. It was determined to possess excellent manoeuvrability, in part due to its engine being placed so close to the aircraft's centre of gravity, and the trials were considered to be a clear success.

By July 1925, in excess of 50 flying hours had been attained with the first prototype; no major changes were made at this stage of the aircraft's development as no major flaws or concerns were reported. Having been sufficiently convinced, in September 1925, the Air Ministry placed an initial order for 30 production aircraft to meet Specification 18/25, which were given the name Gamecock; these were to be powered by the improved Jupiter VI engine, as fitted to the third prototype. During March 1926, the first production aircraft performed its maiden flight; delivery of the type commenced two months later. During July 1926, a second order from the Air Ministry for 40 more Gamecocks was received by Gloster; in November of that same year, another 18 aircraft were also ordered.

== Operational history ==
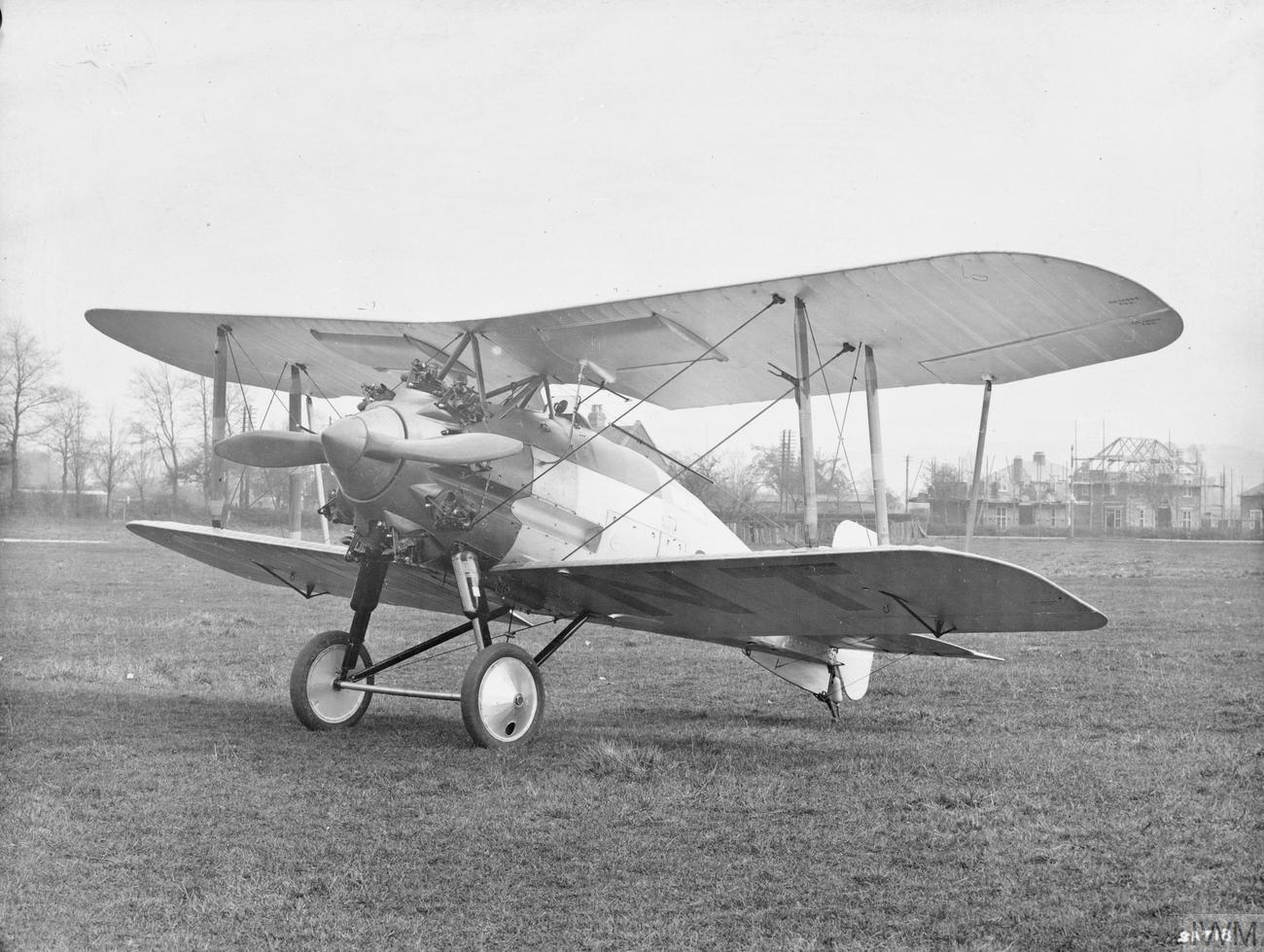
Gloster Gamecock Mk. I Single-seat fighter.

During March 1926, the Gamecock I entered service with 43 Squadron at RAF Henlow, with 23 Squadron, also based at Henlow, following in May that year; 23 Squadron would also be the last of the six RAF squadrons operating the fighter, flying its examples up until July 1931. 3 Squadron and 17 Squadron operated Gamecocks that had been modified for these squadron's night interception duties. The type acquired a particularly attractive reputation amongst the general public for the aerobatic displays that would often be performed at air shows and other major public events during the latter half of the 1920s.

Pilots typically regarded the Gamecock as being an enjoyable aircraft to fly while also being a good gun platform. It was also known for a relatively high number accidents, which was a contributing factor towards its relatively brief service life with the RAF – of the 90 operated by the service, 22 were lost in landing or spin accidents, often involving structural failure. The Gamecock also shared the earlier Grebe's undesirable tendency for flutter. To reduce this problem, Gloster tested alterations to improve the aircraft's flying qualities. The improved Gamecock II was introduced in 1928 with a longer upper wing and a modified tail unit, amongst other refinements.

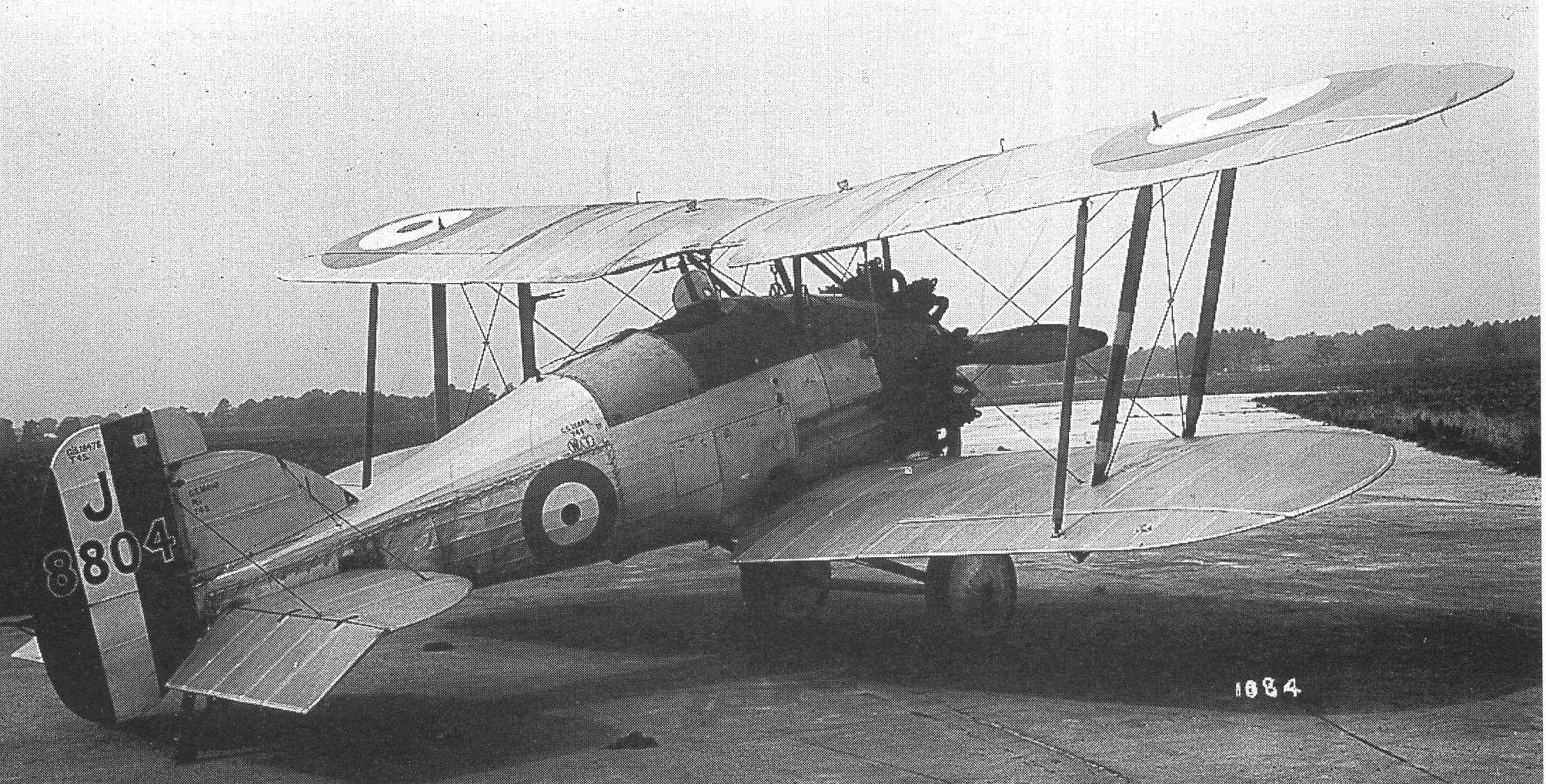
Gamecock II fitted with outward-leaning struts in 1927

Gloster promoted the type to overseas operators and the Finnish Air Force had shown interest in the Gamecock I, resulting in an aerial demonstration being performed over Helsinki on 25 March 1927. The following year, the Gamecock II won a Finnish government contest, leading to a licensing arrangement being made with Gloster, along with an order for a pattern aircraft. Licensed production of the Gamecock, known locally as the Kukko (Finnish language for "rooster"), commenced at the Finnish National Aircraft Factory in 1929. The Kukko was in frontline service with the Finnish Air Force throughout the 1930s, although the type was progressively relegated to training duties towards the end of the decade.

Finnish Kukkos saw combat during the Winter War of 1939–1940 against the Soviet Union. In perhaps the type's highest profile engagement, a Kukko captured a Soviet Ilyushin DB-3 bomber. On 29 January 1940, the fighter had strafed a pair of Soviet DB-3s when they landed on Finnish soil (which they mistook for Estonia) to transfer fuel from one plane to the other. The strafed crews hurried into the one plane which had enough fuel remaining and escaped, leaving the DB-3 behind to be captured by the Finns. At least one Kukko remained operational with the Finnish Air Force up until September 1944, at which point the last example was scrapped.

== Variants ==
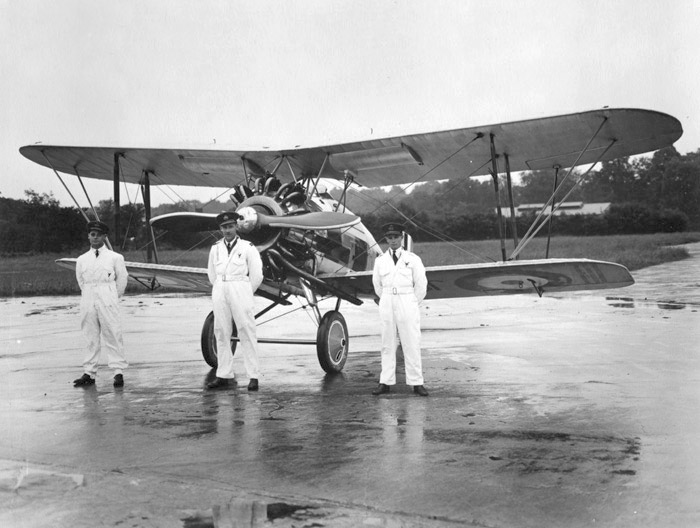
A Gamecock at RAF Hendon, 1931

J7497
Prototype to Air Ministry Specification 37/23 powered by a Jupiter IV engine and first flown in February 1925.
J7756
Prototype with Jupiter IV engine.
J7757
Prototype with Jupiter VI engine.
Gamecock Mk I
Production single-seat fighter aircraft for the RAF, 90 built.
Gamecock Mk II
Single-seat fighter aircraft with revised wing and tail. One new-built for RAF with another Mk I converted to Mk II standard. There were three exported to Finland in 1928, with a further 15 built under licence in Finland from 1929–1930 as the Kukko. The type remained in Finnish service until 1944.
Gamecock Mk III
One RAF Gamecock Mk II modified with lengthened fuselage for spin trials.
Gambet
A carrier-based version of the Gamecock produced as a private venture. Manufactured under licence for the Imperial Japanese Navy as the Nakajima A1N; about 150 were operated from 1929 to 1935 and saw combat during the Shanghai incident in 1932.

== Operators ==
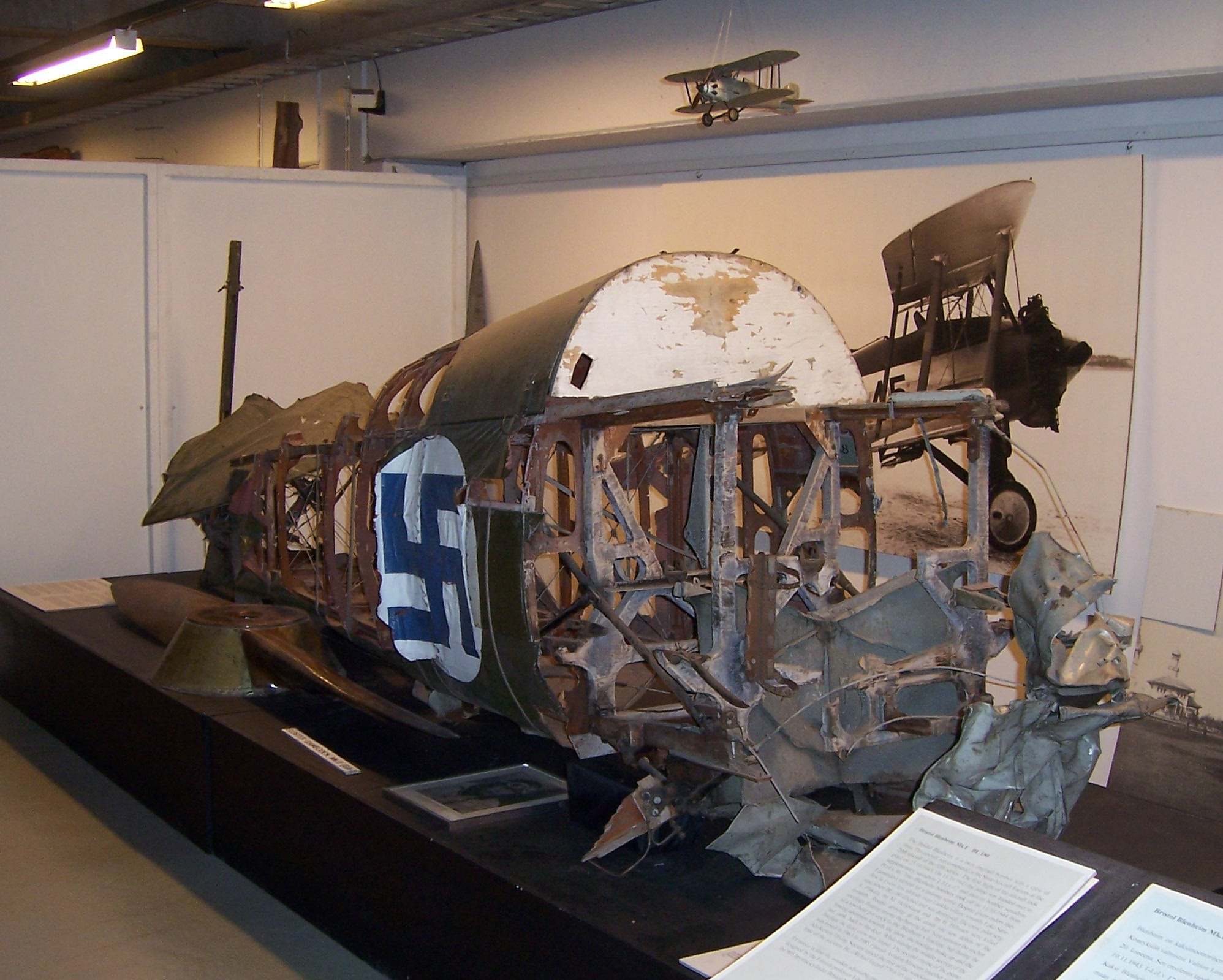
Fuselage wreck at Finnish Aviation Museum

Finland

- Finnish Air Force
  - LeLv 24
  - LeLv 29
  - LeLv 34

United Kingdom

- Royal Air Force
  - No. 3 Squadron - August 1928 to June 1929
  - No. 17 Squadron - January to September 1928
  - No. 19 Squadron - One Gamecock used only.
  - No. 23 Squadron - May 1926 to September 1931.
  - No. 32 Squadron - September 1926 to April 1928
  - No. 43 Squadron - March 1926 to June 1928
  - No. 2 Flying Training School
  - No. 3 Flying Training School
  - Central Flying School
  - RAF College, Cranwell
  - Home Communications Flight

== Surviving aircraft ==
- MkII GA-43/G-CGYF: Owned by Retro Track And Air Uk Ltd under restoration
- Replica GA 97/G-CBTS: Also owned by Retro Track And Air Uk Ltd under restoration

== Specifications (Mk. I) ==
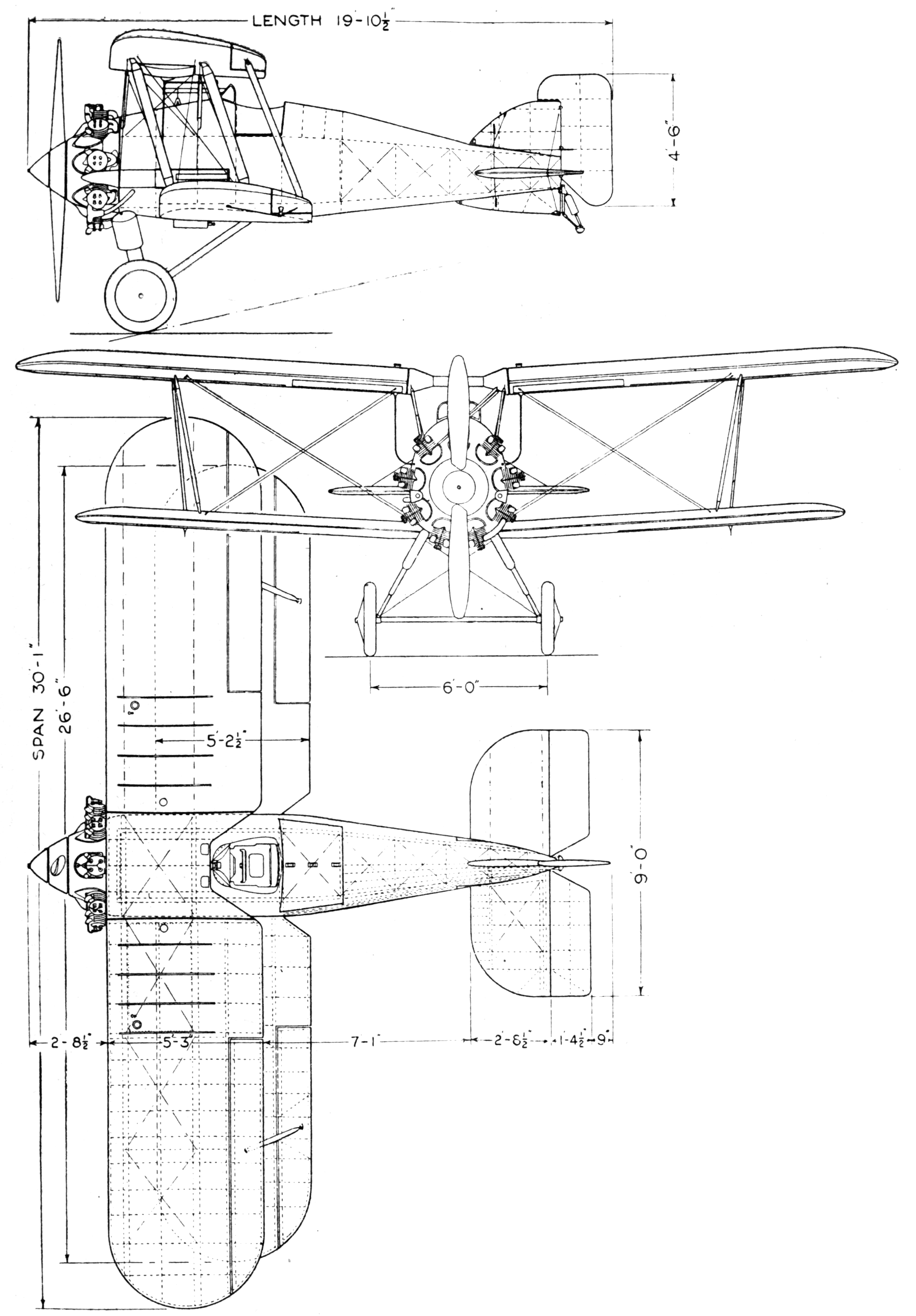
Gloster Gamecock II 3-view drawing from L'Air, 15 August 1927

Data from The Era-Ending Gamecock

General characteristics

- Crew: 1
- Length: 19 ft 8 in (5.99 m)
- Wingspan: 29 ft 9.5 in (9.081 m)
- Height: 9 ft 8 in (2.95 m)
- Wing area: 264 sq ft (24.5 m^{2})
- Empty weight: 1,930 lb (875 kg)
- Gross weight: 2,860 lb (1,297 kg)
- Fuel capacity: 50 imp gal (60 US gal; 230 L)
- Powerplant: 1 × Bristol Jupiter VI nine-cylinder air-cooled radial piston engine, 425 hp (317 kW)
- Propellers: 2-bladed Watts wooden fixed-pitch propeller, 9 ft 0 in (2.74 m) diameter

Performance

- Maximum speed: 155 mph (249 km/h, 135 kn) at 5,000 ft (1,500 m)

145 mph (126 kn; 233 km/h) at 10,000 ft (3,000 m)

- Range: 365 mi (587 km, 317 nmi)
- Endurance: Two hours and 30 minutes
- Service ceiling: 22,100 ft (6,700 m)
- Time to altitude: 10,000 ft (3,000 m) in 7 minutes 36 seconds
- Wing loading: 10.8 lb/sq ft (53 kg/m^{2})
- Power/mass: 0.15 hp/lb (0.25 kW/kg)

Armament

- Guns: 2 × 0.303 in (7.7 mm) Vickers machine guns

== See also ==
Related development

- Gloster Grebe
- Nakajima A1N

Related lists

- List of aircraft of the Royal Air Force
