= North Wing Apache =

American ultralight airplane

Apache

General information
- Type: Ultralight trike
- National origin: United States
- Manufacturer: North Wing Design
- Status: Production completed
- Number built: 72 (February 2005)

The North Wing Apache is an American two-seat ultralight trike designed and produced by North Wing Design of East Wenatchee, Washington. The aircraft is supplied as a kit for amateur construction.

== Design and development ==
The aircraft was designed to comply with the Fédération Aéronautique Internationale microlight category, including the category's maximum gross weight of 450 kg (992 lb). It features a "topless" strut-braced hang glider-style high-wing, weight shift controls, a two-seats-in-tandem open cockpit, tricycle landing gear and a single engine in pusher configuration.

The aircraft is made from bolted-together aluminum tubing, with its double-surface wing covered in Dacron sailcloth. Its 31.5 ft (9.6 m) span wing is supported by streamlined struts, in place of the more commonly used cables and kingpost. The Apache is controlled with a conventional weight shift "A" frame control bar. Standard features include a fiberglass cockpit fairing, wheel pants, nosewheel brakes and stowage bags. Dual control steering and throttle are optional for flight training use. The supplied engines include the Rotax 503 twin-cylinder, two-stroke, air-cooled powerplant of 50 hp (37 kW) and the Rotax 582 twin-cylinder, two-stroke, liquid-cooled powerplant of 64 hp (48 kW).

The strut-braced wing provides a number of advantages over the traditional cable braced wing, including reduced overall height for hangaring, reduced drag and improved appearance.

A total of 72 examples had been delivered by February 2005.

== Variants ==
Apache 582 Contour
Model with Rotax 582 twin-cylinder, two-stroke liquid-cooled powerplant of 64 hp (48 kW), Contour strut-braced wing, cockpit fairing, gross weight of 950 lb (431 kg), circa 2003-05. Price was US$$18,950 in 2005.
Apache 582 Mustang
Model with Rotax 582 powerplant of 64 hp (48 kW), Mustang strut-braced wing, cockpit fairing, gross weight of 950 lb (431 kg), circa 2003.
Apache ST
Model with Rotax 582 powerplant of 64 hp (48 kW), stripped down for off-airport operations, with no cockpit fairing, circa 2003.

== Specifications (Apache 582 Contour) ==
Data from Kitplanes

General characteristics

- Crew: one
- Capacity: one passenger
- Length: 12 ft (3.7 m)
- Wingspan: 31 ft 6 in (9.60 m)
- Wing area: 155 sq ft (14.4 m^{2})
- Empty weight: 400 lb (181 kg)
- Gross weight: 950 lb (431 kg)
- Fuel capacity: 12 U.S. gallons (45 L; 10.0 imp gal)
- Powerplant: 1 × Rotax 582 twin cylinder, two-stroke, liquid-cooled, single-ignition aircraft engine, 64 hp (48 kW)

Performance

- Maximum speed: 75 mph (121 km/h, 65 kn)
- Cruise speed: 60 mph (97 km/h, 52 kn)
- Stall speed: 30 mph (48 km/h, 26 kn)
- Range: 350 mi (560 km, 300 nmi)
- Rate of climb: 1,200 ft/min (6.1 m/s)
