= Verner VM 133 =

Czech aircraft engine

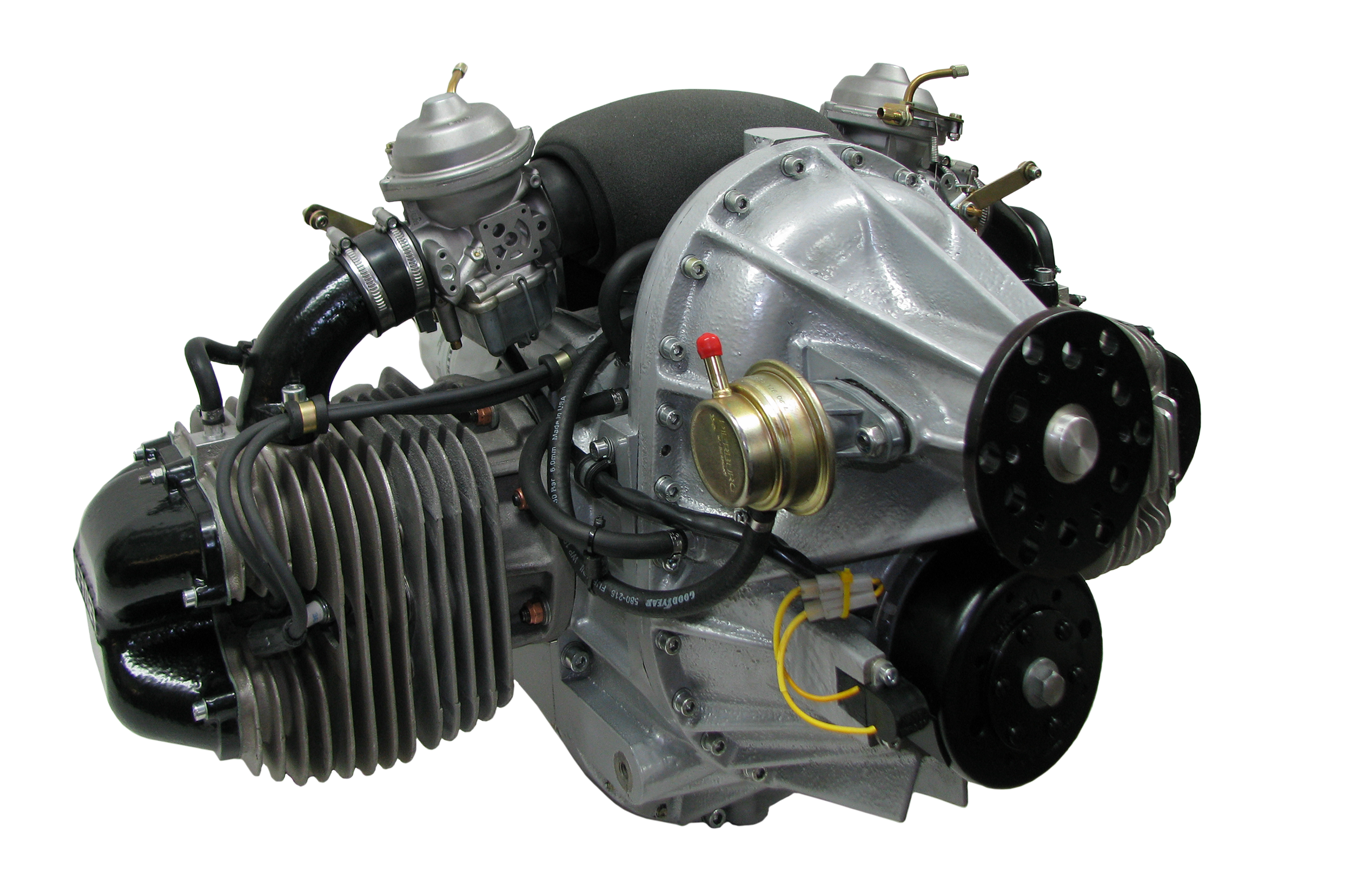
- Verner VM 133MK
- Type: Aircraft engine
- National origin: Czech Republic
- Manufacturer: Verner Motor
- Major applications: Airflow Twinbee; Avid Catalina; SlipStream Genesis
- Manufactured: up until about 2013
- Developed from: Verner 1400

The Verner VM 133 is a family of Czech twin-cylinder, horizontally opposed, four-stroke aircraft engines, designed and built by Verner Motor of Šumperk.

== Design and development ==
The 133M is based on the earlier Verner 1400 and uses a 12 volt 1000W electric starter and has a 12 volt 160W generator. It runs on 95 octane automobile fuel or 100LL Avgas. The recommended time between overhauls is 1000 hours.

The engine was still advertised for sale on the company website in 2013, but by 2015 was no longer listed as available and it is likely that production has ended.

== Variants ==
VM 133M
Original model
VM 133MK
Improved model

== Applications ==
- Airflow Twinbee
- Airkraft Sunny
- Aquilair Swing
- Avid Catalina
- Flitzer Z-21
- Rainbow Cheetah
- SlipStream Genesis

== Specifications (VM133 MK) ==
Data from Technical Data VM133 MK

=== General characteristics ===
- Type: Twin-cylinder, horizontally opposed, four-stroke aircraft engine
- Bore: 97 mm (3.82 in)
- Stroke: 90 mm (3.54 in)
- Displacement: 1,329 cc (81.1 cu in)
- Length: 617 mm (24.29 in)
- Width: 736 mm (28.98 in)
- Height: 456 mm (17.95 in)
- Dry weight: 61 kg (134 lb)

=== Components ===
- Fuel system: Two Bing 64 carburetors pressurized by a Pierburg 7.20971.63 fuel pump
- Fuel type: 95 octane auto fuel or 100LL Avgas
- Oil system: oil class SH/SG 5
- Cooling system: air-cooled
- Reduction gear: 2:1 or 2.29:1 oil-filled gear box

=== Performance ===
- Power output: 63 kW (84 hp) at 5500 rpm for three minutes, 51 kW (68 hp) at 4200 rpm continuous
- Compression ratio: 9.8:1
- Fuel consumption: 11 litres (2.4 imp gal; 2.9 US gal) per hour at cruise settings
- Power-to-weight ratio: 1.03 kW/kg

== See also ==
- Verner JCV 360

Related lists

- List of aircraft engines
