= Verner Motor =

Czech aircraft engine manufacturer

- Company type: Privately held company
- Industry: Aerospace
- Headquarters: Vikýřovice, Czech Republic
- Products: Aircraft engines
- Website: www.vernermotor.com

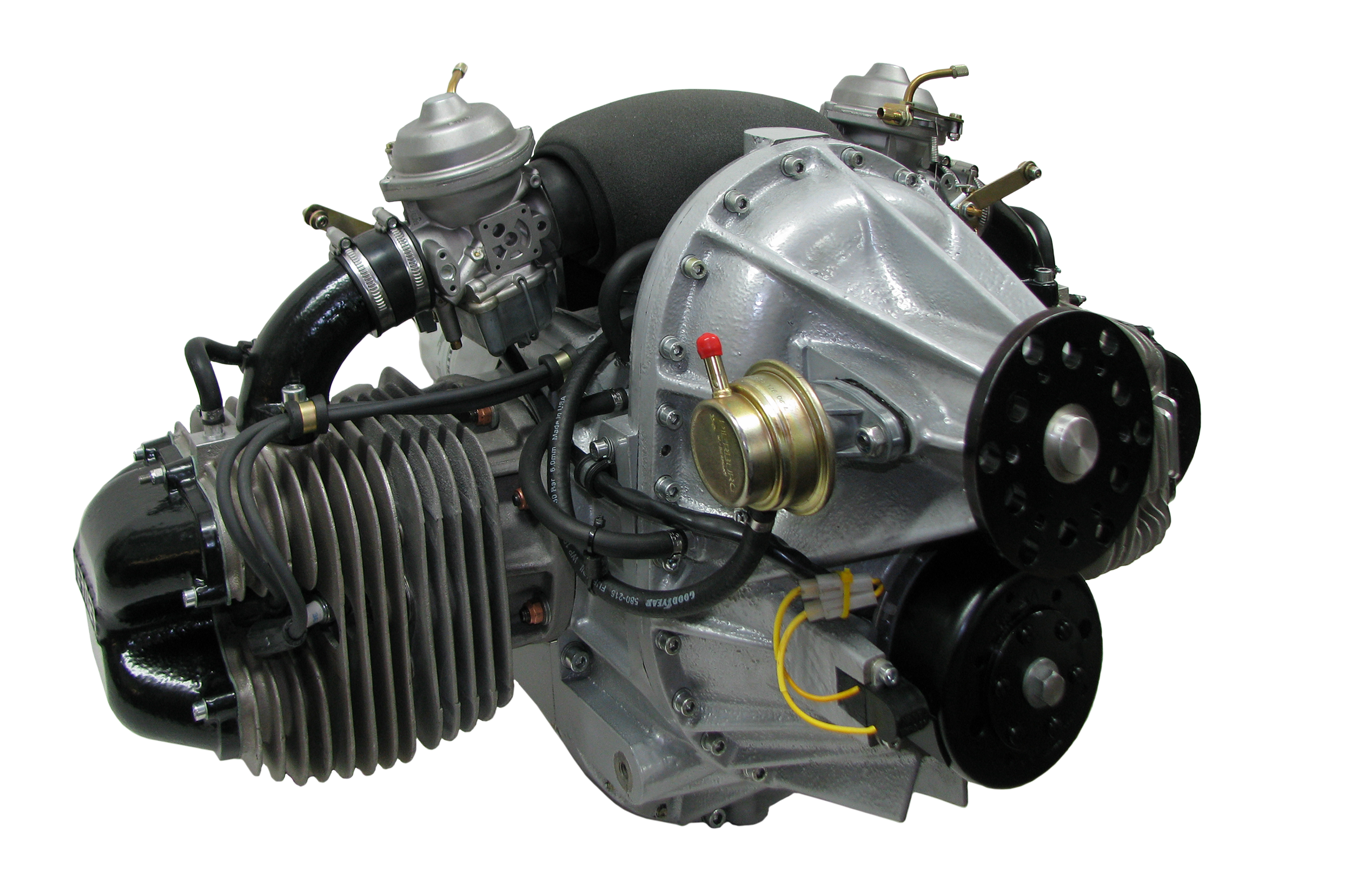
Verner VM 133MK

Verner Motor is a Czech aircraft engine manufacturer based in Vikýřovice. The company specializes in the design and manufacture of piston engines for homebuilt and ultralight aircraft.

The company's first engine was the horizontally-opposed Verner 1400, which was developed into the 84 hp (63 kW) Verner VM 133. The 35 hp (26 kW) Verner JCV 360 was also part of the product line until about 2013 when the company ended production of its horizontally opposed engines to concentrate on the producing radial engines, starting with the Verner Scarlett 7H seven cylinder, four stroke radial, aimed at the antique and replica market.

== Aircraft engines ==
Summary of aircraft engines built by Verner Motor
| Model name | First run | Type |
|---|---|---|
| Verner 1400 | | Two cylinder, horizontally-opposed four stroke engine |
| Verner VM 133 | | Two cylinder, horizontally opposed four stroke engine |
| Verner JCV 360 | | Two cylinder, horizontally opposed four stroke engine |
| Verner Scarlett 3V | | Three cylinder, four stroke radial engine |
| Verner Scarlett 5V | | Five cylinder, four stroke radial engine |
| Verner Scarlett 5Si | | Five cylinder, four stroke radial engine |
| Verner Scarlett 7H | | Seven cylinder, four stroke radial engine |
| Verner Scarlett 7U | | Seven cylinder, four stroke radial engine |
| Verner Scarlett 9S | | Nine cylinder, four stroke radial engine |
