= TechProAviation Merlin 100 =

Czech homebuilt aircraft

Merlin 100
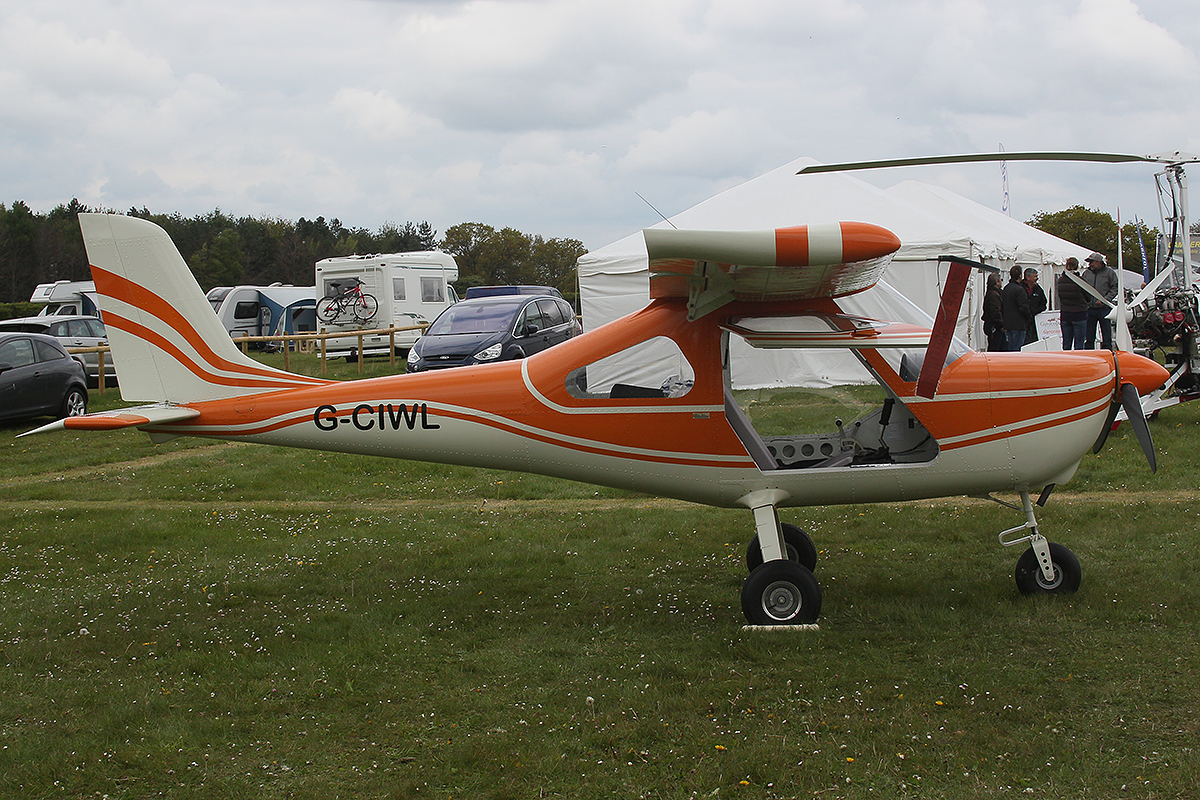
- Merlin HV-100

General information
- Type: Amateur-built aircraft
- National origin: Czech Republic
- Manufacturer: TechProAviation
- Status: In production (2015)
- Number built: 10 by 2013

History
- Introduction date: 2011

The TechProAviation Merlin HV 100 is a Czech amateur-built aircraft, designed and produced by TechProAviation of Olomouc. The aircraft is supplied as a kit for amateur construction.

== Design and development ==
The Merlin 100 features a cantilever high-wing, a single-seat enclosed cockpit accessed via a single door on the fuselage righthand side, fixed tricycle landing gear with wheel pants and a single engine in tractor configuration.

The aircraft is made from matched-hole drilled sheet aluminum. Its 7.8 m (25.6 ft) span wing has an area of 7.05 m^{2} (75.9 sq ft) and mounts flaps. The standard engine used is the 35 hp (26 kW) Verner JCV 360 twin cylinder four-stroke powerplant. Alternative engines include the 60 hp (45 kW) HKS 700E four-stroke, 50 hp (37 kW) Hirth F-23 and 64 hp (48 kW) Rotax 582 two-stroke powerplants. The aircraft will be marketed as a kit only.

By mid-2011 only the prototype had flown, logging 100 hours of testing, These tests led to modifications; by November 2012 the prototype had gained a fin fillet and the mainwheel legs were slightly forward raked.

== Operational history ==
By 2013 ten Merlins had been built. Flyaway prices, without tax, are engine dependent; the cheapest is the Verner-engined variant at €15,500 in 2015.

== Variants ==
These are in production in late 2015:

Merlin 100 UL
Version for the Fédération Aéronautique Internationale microlight class, specification below. A tailwheel version was flown in April 2012 and is available.
Merlin 100 ML
Lightened version for the German 120 kg (265 lb) class It has reduced dimensions, with a span of 6.40 m (21 ft 0 in) and length of 5.12 m (16 ft 10 in), a tailwhell undercarriage and is powered by a Polini motorcycle engine. It first flew in late March 2014.
Merlin Mikro
Version with conventional landing gear for the European 120 kg class. Equipped with a Thor 200 powerplant.
Rotax
As 100UL but with a Rotax 582 engine which gives it a speed of 240 km/h (150 mph; 130 kn). An amphibious floatplane version is planned.

== Specifications (Merlin 100 UL) ==
Data from Bayerl and TechProAviation

General characteristics

- Crew: one
- Length: 5.3 m (17 ft 5 in)
- Wingspan: 7.8 m (25 ft 7 in)
- Height: 2.12 m (6 ft 11 in)
- Wing area: 7.05 m^{2} (75.9 sq ft)
- Empty weight: 150 kg (331 lb)
- Gross weight: 300 kg (661 lb)
- Fuel capacity: 50 litres (11 imp gal; 13 US gal)
- Powerplant: 1 × Verner JCV 360 twin cylinder, air-cooled, four stroke aircraft engine, 26 kW (35 hp)
- Propellers: 2-bladed composite

Performance

- Cruise speed: 160 km/h (99 mph, 86 kn)
- Stall speed: 62 km/h (39 mph, 33 kn) flaps down
- Never exceed speed: 185 km/h (115 mph, 100 kn)
- Wing loading: 42.5 kg/m^{2} (8.7 lb/sq ft)
