= Marga von Etzdorf =

German aviator (1907–1933)

Margarete von Etzdorf
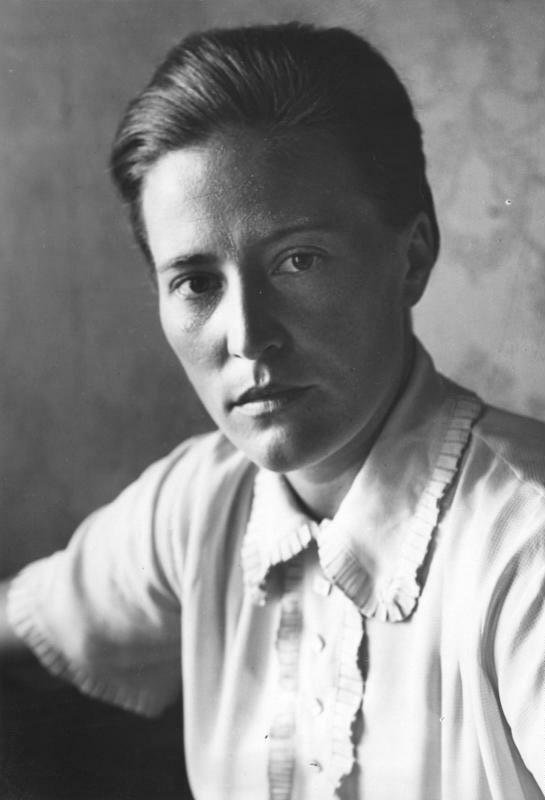
- von Etzdorf, 1932
- Born: August 1, 1907; Spandau, Germany
- Died: May 28, 1933 (aged 25) near Aleppo, Syria
- Occupation: Aviator
- Known for: World's first female airline pilot

Margarete (Marga) von Etzdorf (1 August 1907 - 28 May 1933) was a German aircraft pilot, notable for being the first woman hired to fly for an airline, and the first woman to fly solo across Siberia, from Germany to Tokyo, Japan.

== Career ==
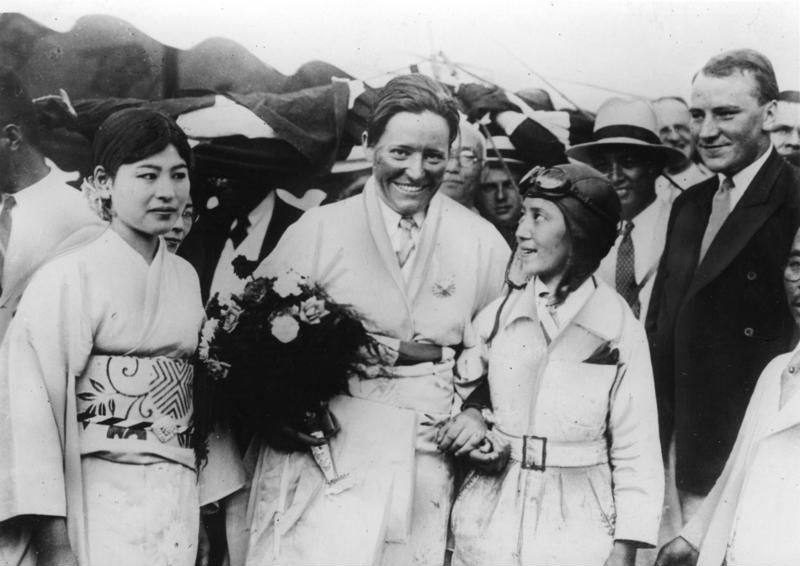
von Etzdorf, upon her arrival in Tokyo, 29 August 1931

When she was 19 years old, von Etzdorf received a pilot's license, the second woman after Thea Rasche to do so after the First World War. On 19 February 1928, she became the first woman to fly for an airline. Since the Deutsche Verkehrsfliegerschule did not accept women at the time, she was mostly self-taught, although she received support from Melitta Schiller, who worked as an engineer at the Deutsche Versuchsanstalt für Luftfahrt. She began flying a commercial Junkers F.13, nicknamed Kiek in die Welt, Berliner for "look in the world," for Lufthansa, then DLH. She flew on the Berlin-Breslau and Berlin-Stuttgart-Basel routes.

In 1930, with support from her grandparents, von Etzdorf bought herself a Junkers A 50ce, "Junior," which she painted bright yellow. She flew her first long-distance flight with it, to Istanbul. Soon afterwards, she attempted to fly to the Canary Islands, but her plane suffered severe damage due to a severe storm above Italy. It had to be sent by train to the Junkers factory, to be repaired. On 18 August 1931 she began her record-breaking flight to Tokyo. After 11 days, on 29 August 1931, she landed at Haneda Airport, where she was received warmly. The construction of the airport, costing approximately half-a-million dollars at the time, had recently finished, and von Etzdorf was the first foreigner to enter Japan by that port. Her flight back was not as successful, due to a severe loss in altitude that left the aircraft damaged beyond repair and the pilot severely injured after taking off from a stopover in Bangkok. She made the most of her time in what is now Thailand, being the first person to send reports of the Siamese Revolution to Europe. She returned to Berlin on 18 July 1932.

== Personal life ==
She was the daughter of a captain in the Prussian Army, Fritz Wolff, and his wife Margarete, she lost both of her parents in an accident in Ragusa, Sicily when she was four years old. After the accident, she and her sister, Ursula, lived with their grandparents Ulrich von Etzdorf, who was a General in the Prussian army, and his wife.

After returning from Tokyo, Elly Beinhorn suggested she fly to Cape Town, South Africa. On 27 May 1933, she attempted to make a stopover near Aleppo, but lost control of her Klemm Kl 32, due to heavy winds. After dealing with the necessary formalities, she asked for a private room, where, not even an hour after the crash, she killed herself, because she felt that she could not bear returning to Germany.

There has been much speculation about the reasons for the suicide: Another return without an aeroplane would have destroyed her reputation as an aviator – no manufacturer would have entrusted her with an aeroplane again and no sponsor would have supported her ventures financially once more. Her flying career would have been over. It was not until 2007, through the research of historian Evelyn Crellin, that it became public that von Etzdorf had entered into a secret agreement with the Nazis and that she was to initiate illegal arms deals. A letter from Ernst Heymann (retired captain, employee of the Haenel arms company and arms lobbyist with contacts to the NSDAP) was found in her last luggage. The letter from Heymann indicated that the submachine gun was not only for self-defense, but mainly for illegal negotiations for the distribution of Schmeisser submachine guns. Enclosed were accessories and 100 rounds of ammunition as well as German and English catalogues and price lists. She was supposed to earn money from possible sales. Carrying the submachine gun for private use would have been permitted only with the permission of the overflown country. However, trade in such weapons also violated fundamental provisions of the Treaty of Versailles. The Foreign Office, which had sent a diplomat to Aleppo, was well aware of the explosive nature of this situation. France had the League of Nations mandate for Syria and Lebanon at the time. Today it is assumed that one of the reasons for the suicide was the fear of discovery by French officials and of propagandistic exploitation by the French government. The latter refrained from capitalizing on the incident after the death. In Germany, arms smuggling was never publicized or discussed for decades.

She was buried in the Invalidenfriedhof in Berlin, but her grave was destroyed in the 1970s, due to its proximity to the Berlin Wall. Her gravestone read Der Flug ist das Leben wert, or "flying is worth life".
