= North Wing Sport X2 =

American ultralight trike

Sport X2

General information
- Type: Ultralight trike
- National origin: United States
- Manufacturer: North Wing Design
- Status: In production (2013)

The North Wing Sport X2 is an American ultralight trike, designed and produced by North Wing Design of Chelan, Washington. The aircraft is supplied as a kit for amateur construction or as a complete ready-to-fly-aircraft.

== Design and development ==
The X2 was designed to comply with the Fédération Aéronautique Internationale microlight category and the US light-sport aircraft rules. It is listed on the Federal Aviation Administration's list of accepted SLSAs.

The X2 features a strut-braced hang glider-style high-wing, weight-shift controls, a two-seats-in-tandem open cockpit with a cockpit fairing, tricycle landing gear with wheel pants and a single engine in pusher configuration.

The aircraft is made from bolted-together aluminum tubing, with its double surface wing covered in Dacron sailcloth. Its 9.6 m (31.5 ft) span wing is supported by struts and uses an "A" frame weight-shift control bar. The SLSA's powerplant is a twin cylinder, liquid-cooled, two-stroke, dual-ignition 64 hp (48 kW) Rotax 582 engine. Other engines are available for the kit-built versions, including the four cylinder, air and liquid-cooled, four-stroke, dual-ignition 80 hp (60 kW) Rotax 912UL and the 60 hp (45 kW) HKS 700E engine. With the Rotax 582 engine the aircraft has an empty weight of 450 lb (204 kg) and a gross weight of 1,060 lb (481 kg), giving a useful load of 610 lb (277 kg).

A number of different wings can be fitted to the basic carriage, including the North Wing Apache 3 or the North Wing Quest GT5. The North Wing M-Pulse 2 was formerly the standard wing.

== Variants ==
Sport X2 Apache
Fully equipped version
Sport X2 Navajo
Minimally equipped version

== Specifications (Sport X2 Apache) ==
Data from Bayerl

General characteristics

- Crew: one
- Capacity: one passenger
- Wingspan: 9.6 m (31 ft 6 in)
- Wing area: 15.0 m^{2} (161 sq ft)
- Empty weight: 204 kg (450 lb)
- Gross weight: 481 kg (1,060 lb)
- Powerplant: 1 × Rotax 582 twin cylinder, liquid-cooled, two stroke aircraft engine, 48 kW (64 hp)

Performance

- Cruise speed: 76 km/h (47 mph, 41 kn)
- Stall speed: 55 km/h (34 mph, 30 kn)
- Rate of climb: 3.0 m/s (590 ft/min)
- Wing loading: 32.1 kg/m^{2} (6.6 lb/sq ft)
