= North Wing ATF =

American ultralight trike

ATF

General information
- Type: Ultralight trike
- National origin: United States
- Manufacturer: North Wing Design
- Status: In production
- Number built: 10 (February 2000)

The North Wing ATF (Air Time Fix) is an American single-seat ultralight trike designed and produced by North Wing Design of East Wenatchee, Washington. The aircraft is supplied as a kit for amateur construction.

== Design and development ==
The ATF is a nanotrike intended for use as a motorglider, taking off under power and then shutting down the engine for soaring flight.

The aircraft was designed to comply with US FAR 103 Ultralight Vehicles rules, including the category's maximum empty weight of 254 lb (115 kg). The aircraft has a standard empty weight of 186 lb (84 kg). It features a minimalist design, cable-braced hang glider-style high-wing, weight-shift controls, a single-seat, open cockpit, tricycle landing gear and a single engine in pusher configuration.

The aircraft is made from bolted-together aluminum tubing, with its double-surface wing covered in Dacron sailcloth. Its 34.7 ft (10.6 m) span Stratus XP wing is supported by cables and kingpost and is weight-shift controlled by an "A" frame control bar. The original wing offered by the manufacturer was the Stratos, but this was replaced by the improved Stratus XP in 2010. The Stratos XP features fiberglass wingtips, a different shaped sail providing a better glide ratio and lower sink rate. It is available in two sizes, 16 m^{2} (170 sq ft) and 17.5 m^{2} (188 sq ft).

The aircraft was originally powered by the 22 hp (16 kW) Zenoah G-25 single cylinder, two-stroke engine. Engines available in 2012 are the 26 hp (19 kW) Simonini Mini2, 30 hp (22 kW) Zanzottera MZ 34, 25 hp (19 kW) Vittorazi 185 and the 22 hp (16 kW) Bailey V4-200 powerplants.

The ATF can be folded up to 27" x 30" x 55" (69 x 76 x 140 cm) for storage or ground transport.

== Specifications (ATF with Stratus XP 17.5 wing) ==
Data from North Wing

General characteristics

- Crew: one
- Wingspan: 34.7 ft (10.6 m)
- Aspect ratio: 6.33
- Empty weight: 186 lb (84 kg)
- Gross weight: 550 lb (249 kg)
- Fuel capacity: 5 U.S. gallons (19 L; 4.2 imp gal)
- Powerplant: 1 × Zanzottera MZ 34 single cylinder, two-stroke, air-cooled aircraft engine, 30 hp (22 kW)
- Propellers: 2-bladed wooden, 4 ft 3 in (1.30 m) diameter

Performance

- Maximum speed: 45 mph (72 km/h, 39 kn)
- Cruise speed: 30 mph (48 km/h, 26 kn)
- Stall speed: 21 mph (34 km/h, 18 kn)
- Never exceed speed: 53 mph (85 km/h, 46 kn)
- g limits: 6
- Maximum glide ratio: 10.5:1
- Rate of climb: 300 ft/min (1.5 m/s)
- Rate of sink: 220 ft/min (1.1 m/s)
