= North Wing Maverick =

American ultralight trike aircraft

Maverick
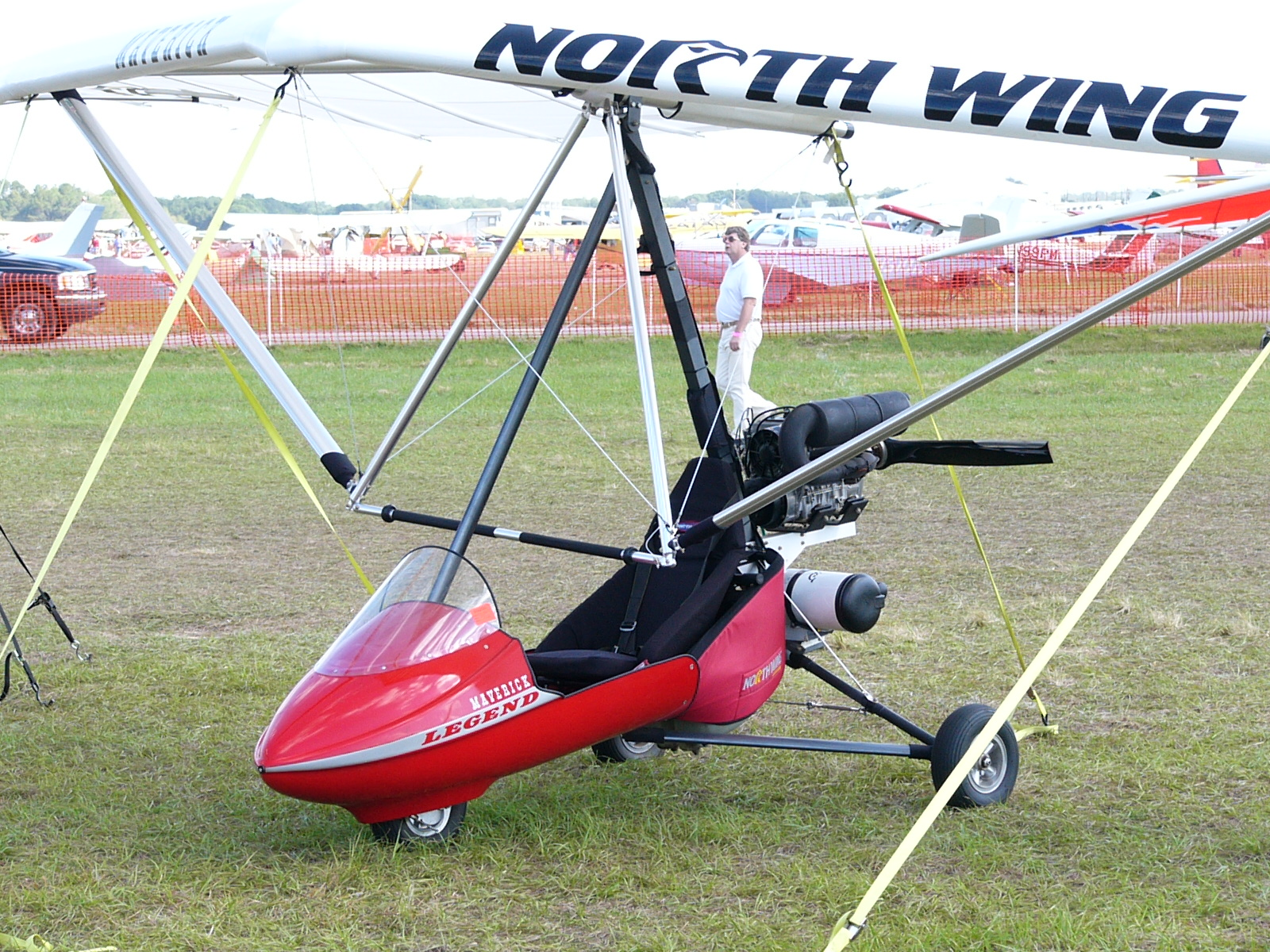
- North Wing Maverick Legend

General information
- Type: Ultralight trike
- National origin: United States
- Manufacturer: North Wing Design
- Status: In production
- Number built: 10 (February 2000)

The North Wing Maverick is an American single-seat ultralight trike designed and produced by North Wing Design of East Wenatchee, Washington. The aircraft is supplied as a kit for amateur construction.

== Design and development ==
The aircraft was designed to comply with US FAR 103 Ultralight Vehicles rules, including the category's maximum empty weight of 254 lb (115 kg). The aircraft has a standard empty weight of 252 lb (114 kg). It features a "top-less" strut-braced hang glider-style high-wing, weight-shift controls, a single-seat, open cockpit, tricycle landing gear and a single engine in pusher configuration.

The aircraft is made from bolted-together aluminum tubing, with its single surface wing covered in Dacron sailcloth. Its 31.5 ft (9.6 m) span wing is supported by streamlined struts, in place of the more commonly used cables and kingpost. The Maverick is controlled with a conventional weight-shift "A" frame control bar. In 2008 the aircraft was improved with a folding wing pylon and increased baggage space. In 2009 it received a higher gross weight from 550 to 650 lb (249 to 295 kg).

The strut-braced wing provides a number of advantages over the traditional cable braced wing, including reduced overall height for hangaring, reduced drag and improved appearance.

Older Maverick models may be brought up to Maverick 2 standards with a factory-supplied conversion kit.

== Variants ==
Maverick 103
Model with Rotax 447 twin cylinder, two-stroke powerplant of 40 hp (30 kW), cockpit fairing, gross weight of 550 lb (249 kg), designed for the US FAR 103 Ultralight vehicles category, circa 2000.
Maverick Mustang
Model with Rotax 447 twin cylinder, two-stroke powerplant of 40 hp (30 kW), cockpit fairing, Mustang wing, gross weight of 550 lb (249 kg), designed for the US FAR 103 Ultralight vehicles category, circa 2003.
Maverick 2 Legend
Model with Rotax 447 twin cylinder, two-stroke powerplant of 40 hp (30 kW), cockpit fairing, improved stowage space, spring-assisted mast raising/lowering, Maverick 3 14.9M wing and gross weight of 600 lb (272 kg). The empty weight of this model exceeds US ultralight category weights. Optional engines include the Kawasaki 340 and the Verner JCV-360.
Maverick 2 RT
Model with Rotax 447 twin cylinder, two-stroke powerplant of 40 hp (30 kW), Maverick 2 14.9M wing, but with no cockpit fairing. The empty weight of this model meets US ultralight category requirements. Optional engines include the Kawasaki 340 and the Verner JCV-360.

== Specifications (Maverick 103) ==
Data from Kitplanes

General characteristics

- Crew: one
- Length: 7 ft (2.1 m)
- Wingspan: 31 ft 6 in (9.60 m)
- Height: 7 ft (2.1 m)
- Wing area: 157 sq ft (14.6 m^{2})
- Empty weight: 252 lb (114 kg)
- Gross weight: 550 lb (249 kg)
- Fuel capacity: 5 U.S. gallons (19 L; 4.2 imp gal)
- Powerplant: 1 × Rotax 447 twin cylinder, two-stroke, air-cooled, single-ignition aircraft engine, 40 hp (30 kW)

Performance

- Cruise speed: 45 mph (72 km/h, 39 kn)
