= Verner JCV 360 =

JCV 360
- Type: Aircraft engine
- National origin: Czech Republic
- Manufacturer: Verner Motor
- Major applications: Airsport Song; North Wing Maverick; Spacek SD-1 Minisport
- Manufactured: up until about 2013

The Verner JCV 360 is a Czech aircraft engine, designed and built by Verner Motor of Šumperk for use in ultralight aircraft.

== Design and development ==
The engine is a twin-cylinder, 360 cc (22.0 cu in), horizontally-opposed four-stroke, liquid-cooled, gasoline engine design, with a poly V belt reduction drive with reduction ratio of 2.76:1. It employs a single electronic ignition and produces 35 hp (26 kW) at 7800 rpm.

The engine was still advertised for sale on the company website in 2013, but by 2015 was no longer listed as available and it is likely that production has ended.

== Applications ==
- Airsport Song
- North Wing Maverick
- Spacek SD-1 Minisport
- TechProAviation Merlin 100

== Specifications (JCV 360) ==
Data from World Directory of Leisure Aviation 2011-12

=== General characteristics ===
- Type: Twin cylinder, horizontally-opposed, four stroke aircraft engine
- Bore: 63 mm (2.5 in)
- Stroke: 58 mm (2.3 in)
- Displacement: 360 cc (22.0 cu in)
- Length: 580 mm (22.8 in)
- Width: 340 mm (13.4 in)
- Height: 360 mm (14.2 in)
- Dry weight: 30.5 kg (67.2 lb)

=== Components ===
- Fuel type: gasoline
- Cooling system: liquid
- Reduction gear: poly V belt reduction drive, reduction ratio of 2.76:1

=== Performance ===
- Power output: 35 hp (26 kW) at 7800 rpm
- Compression ratio: 11:1

== See also ==
- Verner VM 133

Related lists

- List of aircraft engines
