= North Wing Design =

American aircraft manufacturer

- Industry: Aerospace
- Headquarters: Chelan, Washington, United States
- Products: Hang gliders Ultralight trikes Light-sport aircraft
- Website: northwing.com

North Wing Design is an American aircraft manufacturer, specializing in hang gliders, light-sport aircraft and ultralight trikes. The company was based in East Wenatchee, Washington and later moved to Chelan, Washington.

The company makes its own sails and wings, and supplies more wings to other North American trike manufacturers, such as Wettrike, than any other manufacturer.

== Aircraft ==
Summary of aircraft built by North Wing Design
Model name	First flight	Number built	Type
North Wing Apache		72 (Feb 2005)	ultralight trike
North Wing ATF			ultralight trike
North Wing Maverick		10 (Feb 2000)	ultralight trike
North Wing Scout XC			ultralight trike
North Wing Solairus			ultralight trike
North Wing Sport X2			ultralight trike
North Wing T2 Tandem			hang glider
North Wing Liberty			hang glider
North Wing Horizon ET			hang glider
North Wing Freedom			hang glider
North Wing EZY			hang glider
