= North Wing Solairus =

American ultralight trike

Solairus

General information
- Type: Ultralight trike
- National origin: United States
- Manufacturer: North Wing Design
- Status: Production completed

History
- Introduction date: c. 2015

The North Wing Solairus is an American ultralight trike that was designed and produced by North Wing Design of Chelan, Washington, introduced about 2015. Now out of production, when it was available it was supplied complete and ready-to-fly.

By February 2018, the aircraft was no longer offered for sale on the company website, although a trike wing with the same name was still in production.

== Design and development ==
The Solairus was designed to comply with the US FAR 103 Ultralight Vehicles rules, including the category's maximum empty weight of 254 lb (115 kg). The aircraft has a standard empty weight of 254 lb (115 kg).

The aircraft design features a strut-braced topless hang glider-style high-wing, weight-shift controls, a single-seat open cockpit with a cockpit fairing, tricycle landing gear with wheel fairings and a single engine in pusher configuration.

The aircraft wing is made from bolted-together aluminum tubing, with its double surface wing covered in Dacron sailcloth. The trike carriage is of composite materials and is an aerodynamically faired design. Its 34.68 ft (10.6 m) span wing is supported by a single tube-type kingpost and uses an "A" frame weight-shift control bar. The powerplant is a single-cylinder, air-cooled, two-stroke 21 hp (16 kW) Polini Thor 100, 29 hp (22 kW) Polini Thor 200 engine or the 22 hp (16 kW) Bailey 200 V4.

The aircraft has a carriage weight of 108 lb (49 kg) and an empty weight of 254 lb (115 kg).

== Specifications (Solairus) ==
Data from Tacke

General characteristics

- Crew: one
- Wingspan: 34 ft 8 in (10.57 m)
- Wing area: 180 sq ft (17 m^{2})
- Empty weight: 254 lb (115 kg)
- Powerplant: 1 × Polini Thor 100 single cylinder, air-cooled, two stroke aircraft engine, 21 hp (16 kW)
- Propellers: 2-bladed fixed pitch

Performance

- Maximum speed: 45 mph (73 km/h, 39 kn)
- Cruise speed: 25 mph (40 km/h, 22 kn)
- Stall speed: 21 mph (33 km/h, 18 kn)
