= Nakajima A1N =

Japanese carrier-based fighter

A1N
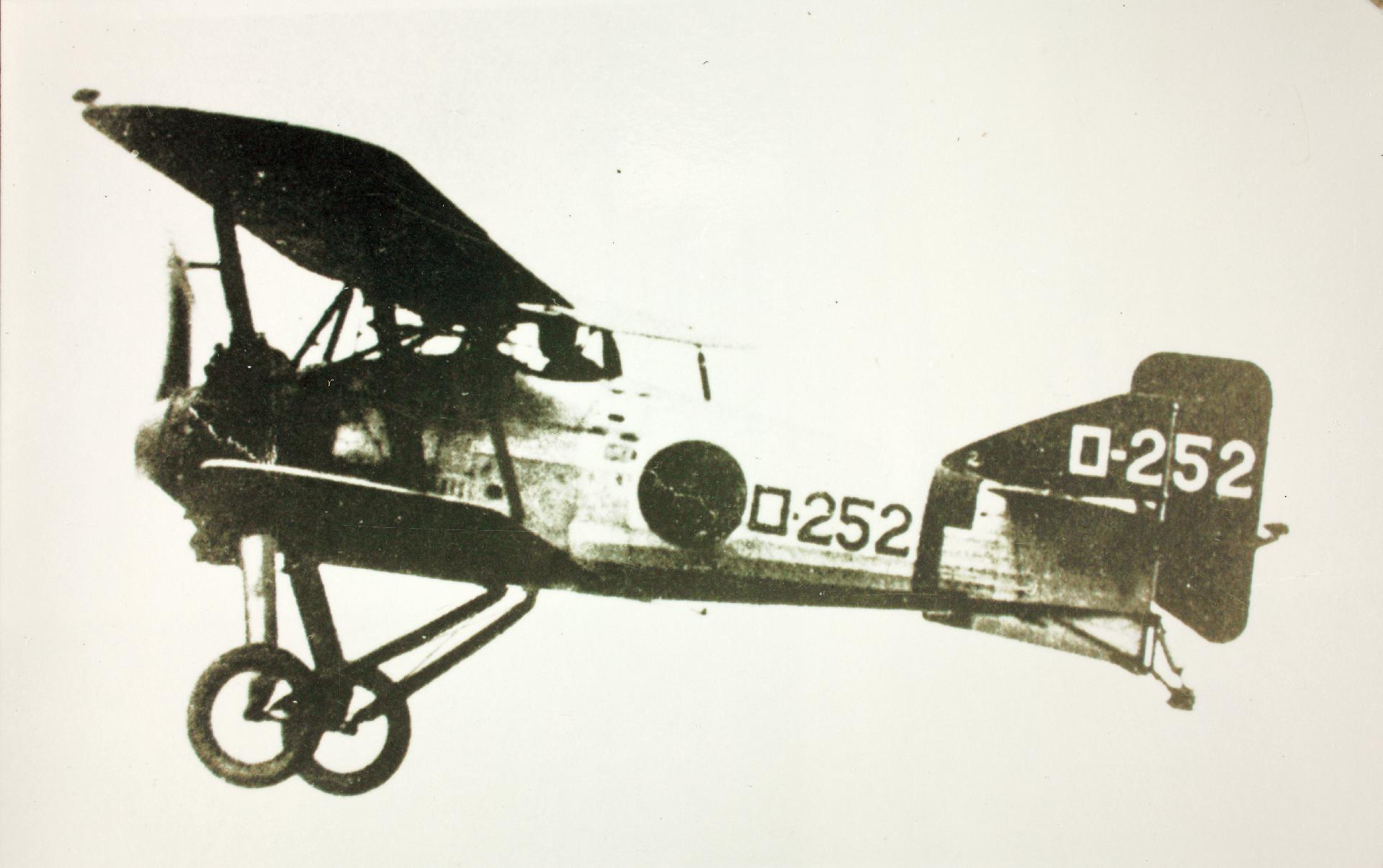

General information
- Type: Fighter
- Manufacturer: Nakajima
- Designer: H. P. Folland (Gloster Aircraft Company)
- Primary user: IJN Air Service
- Number built: 151

History
- Introduction date: 1929
- First flight: 12 December 1927
- Retired: 1935
- Developed from: Gloster Gambet

The Nakajima A1N, or Navy Type 3 Carrier Fighter, was a Japanese carrier-based fighter of the late-1920s and early-1930s. It was a licensed copy of the British Gloster Gambet fighter, built by the Nakajima Aircraft Company for the Imperial Japanese Navy. Approximately 150 were built in two versions, the A1N1 and A1N2.

== Development ==
By 1926, the Imperial Japanese Navy's Mitsubishi 1MF fighters (also known as Type 10 Carrier Fighters) were in need of replacement, and so three of the leading Japanese aircraft manufacturers, Nakajima, Mitsubishi, and Aichi were asked for proposals for a new carrier-based fighter.

Nakajima purchased a licence from the British Gloster Aircraft Company for production of the Gloster Gambet. It was a private venture design for a carrier-based derivative of their earlier Gloster Gamecock fighter. The prototype Gambet was built by Gloster and first flew on 12 December 1927.

The prototype Gambet was shipped to Japan early in 1928. After modifications were made and it was fitted with a Nakajima-built Bristol Jupiter engine, the Gambet was evaluated by the Japanese navy against competitors from Aichi and Mitsubishi. It proved to be more manoeuvrable while still being a stable gun platform and was selected in April 1929 for production as the Navy Type 3 Carrier Fighter, with the short designation A1N1. 50 A1N1s were built.

The A1N2 used the 336 kW (450 hp) Nakajima Kotobuki 2 engine and was introduced in 1930. Production of approximately 100 was completed by 1932.

== Design ==
The Gambet was a single-seat, single-bay biplane, of all-wooden construction and powered by an air-cooled Bristol Jupiter radial engine. While similar to the Gamecock, it was fitted with longer-span wings, internal flotation bags, and arrestor hooks for carrier operations.

== Operational history ==
The A1N1 entered service in 1929, replacing the Mitsubishi 1-MF. It served on the carriers Hōshō, Akagi, Kaga, and Ryūjō. The improved A1N2 entered service in 1930, with production continuing until 1932.

The A1N flew from the carriers Hōshō and Kaga during the Shanghai Incident in 1932 between Japan and China. A1Ns from Kaga scored the Imperial Japanese Navy's first air-to-air combat victory on 22 February 1932 when they shot down a Boeing P-12 (specifically a Model 218, Prototype of the P-12E/F4B-3 variant, after evaluation sold to the Chinese Air Force) flown by the American volunteer pilot Robert Short. A 15-aircraft formation composed of Mitsubishi B1Ms with A1N escorts attacked Qiaosi Airbase in Hangzhou on 26 February 1932, engaging Chinese fighters in a dogfight, shooting down at least one Junkers K 47.

A1Ns continued in service until 1935, being replaced in service by the Nakajima A2N or Navy Type 90 Carrier Fighter.

== Variants ==
Gloster Gambet
Prototype carrier-based fighter designed and built by Gloster Aircraft Company in the United Kingdom. Powered by one 313 kW (420 hp) Bristol Jupiter VI radial engine, one built.
Nakajima A1N1
Initial licensed production version. Powered by Nakajima built Jupiter VI engine, 50 built between 1928 and 1930.
Nakajima A1N2
Improved production version, powered by 336 kW (450 hp) Nakajima Kotobuki 2 engine. Approximately 100 built between 1930 and 1932.

== Operators ==
Japan

- Imperial Japanese Navy Air Service

== Specifications (A1N2) ==
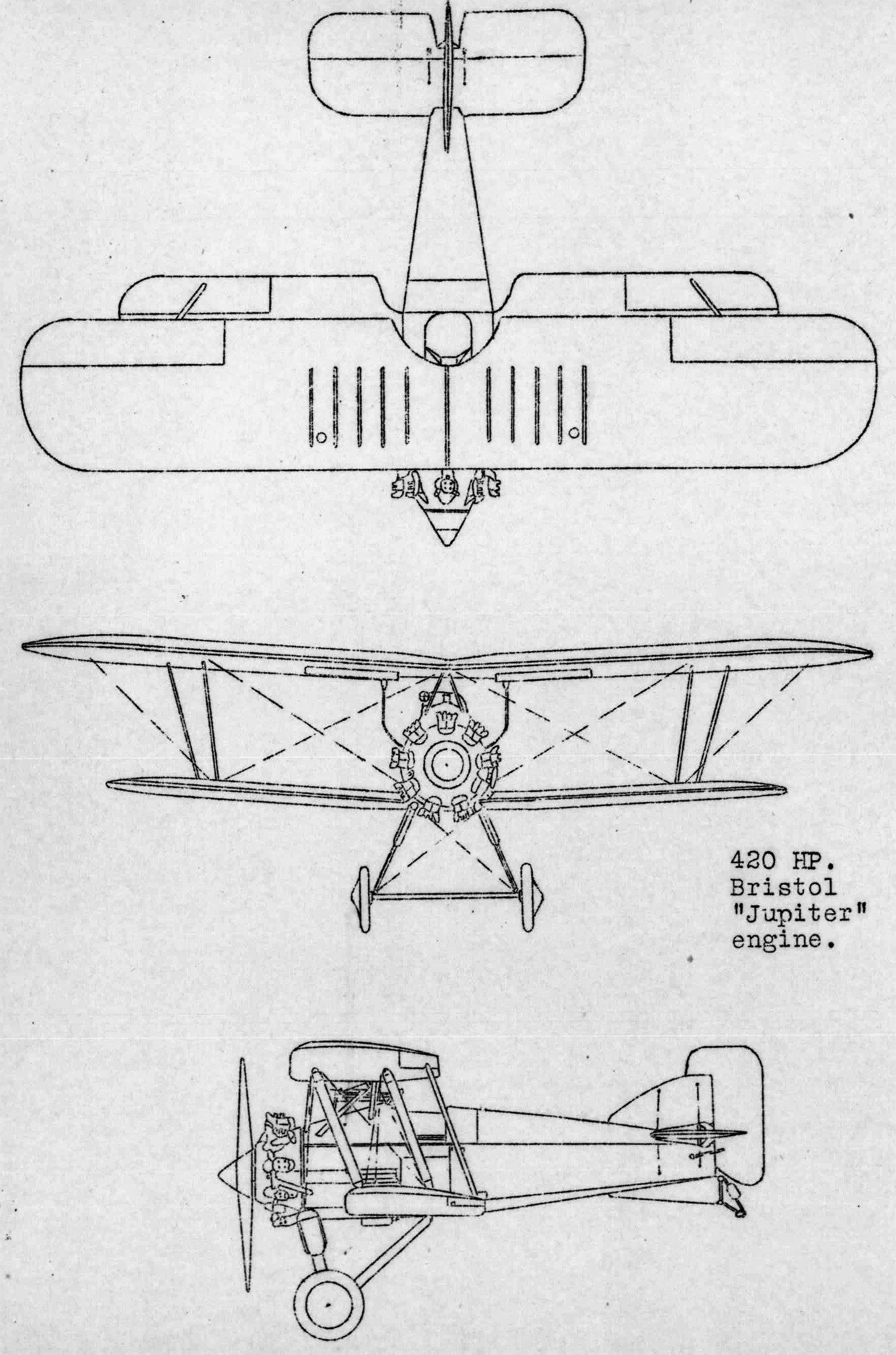
Gloster Gambet 3 view drawing from NACA Aircraft Circular No.48

Data from Japanese Aircraft 1910-1941

General characteristics

- Crew: 1
- Length: 6.5 m (21 ft 4 in)
- Wingspan: 9.7 m (31 ft 10 in)
- Height: 3.3 m (10 ft 10 in)
- Wing area: 26.3 m^{2} (283 sq ft)
- Empty weight: 882 kg (1,944 lb)
- Max takeoff weight: 1,375 kg (3,031 lb)
- Powerplant: 1 × Nakajima Kotobuki 2 9-cylinder air-cooled radial piston engine, 336 kW (451 hp)
- Propellers: 2-bladed fixed-pitch wooden propeller

Performance

- Maximum speed: 241 km/h (150 mph, 130 kn)
- Cruise speed: 148 km/h (92 mph, 80 kn)
- Range: 370 km (230 mi, 200 nmi)
- Service ceiling: 7,000 m (23,000 ft)
- Time to altitude: 3,000 m (9,800 ft) in 6 minutes 10 seconds
- Wing loading: 3.05 kg/m^{2} (0.62 lb/sq ft)
- Power/mass: 0.24 kW/kg (0 hp/lb)

Armament

- Guns: 2 × fixed, forward-firing 7.7 mm (.303 in) machine guns
- Bombs: 2 × 30 kg (66 lb) bombs

== See also ==
Related development

- Gloster Gamecock
