= Hermann Pohlmann =

German aerospace engineer

- Born: 26 June 1894
- Died: July 24, 1991 (aged 97)
- Occupation: Aircraft designer
- Employers: Junkers; Blohm & Voss; Hamburger Flugzeugbau

Hermann Pohlmann (26 June 1894 – 7 July 1991) was a German aerospace engineer.

He designed the Junkers A50 Junior in 1929. He was the principal designer of the Junkers Ju 87 "Stuka", a dive bomber used during World War II, before becoming Deputy Chief Designer at Blohm & Voss.

After the war, when the Hamburger Flugzeugbau (HFB) was recreated in 1956, he was appointed Chief Designer and led the team which designed the HFB 320 Hansa Jet.

== Published works ==
- Pohlmann, Hermann (1982). Chronik Eines Flugzeugwerkes 1932–1945, Motorbuch. ISBN 3-87943-624-X. The story of Hamburger Flugzeugbau and the Blohm & Voss aircraft subsidiary.
