= Verner Scarlett 7H =

Scarlett 7H
- Type: Aircraft engine
- National origin: Czech Republic
- Manufacturer: Verner Motor

The Verner Scarlett 7H is a Czech aircraft radial engine, designed and produced by Verner Motor of Šumperk for use in ultralight and homebuilt aircraft.

By April 2018 the engine was no longer advertised on the company website and seems to be out of production.

== Design and development ==
The engine is a four-stroke, seven-cylinder radial, 4,386 cc (267.7 cu in) displacement, air-cooled, direct-drive, gasoline engine design. It employs electronic ignition and produces 117 hp (87 kW) at 2300 rpm, with a compression ratio of 7.3:1.

== Specifications (Scarlett 7H) ==
Data from Tacke

=== General characteristics ===
- Type: Seven-cylinder, four-stroke radial aircraft engine
- Bore: 94 mm (3.7 in)
- Stroke: 90 mm (3.5 in)
- Displacement: 4,386 cc (267.7 cu in)
- Length: 602 mm (23.7 in)
- Diameter: 780 mm (30.7 in)
- Dry weight: 81 kg (178.6 lb)

=== Components ===
- Fuel type: gasoline, minimum of 95 octane
- Cooling system: air
- Reduction gear: none

=== Performance ===
- Power output: 117 hp (87 kW)
- Compression ratio: 7.3:1

== See also ==
Related lists

- List of aircraft engines
