= Electric Aircraft Corporation =

American aircraft manufacturer

- Type: Private company
- Industry: Aerospace
- Founder: Randall Fishman
- Headquarters: Cliffside Park, New Jersey, U.S.
- Products: Electric aircraft

Electric Aircraft Corporation is an American aircraft manufacturer that was founded by Randall Fishman, a retired New Jersey jeweler. The company is based in Cliffside Park, New Jersey and specializes in the design and manufacture of electric aircraft under the ElectraFlyer brand name.

The company's first product was the ElectraFlyer Trike, an ultralight trike powered by an in-house designed electric motor and battery pack. The company then started selling power train components to convert existing ultralights to electric power. The single-seat ElectraFlyer-C followed, using the same 18 hp (13 kW) electric motor and a converted Monnett Moni motorglider airframe.

In 2008 Fishman won the August Raspet Memorial Award for his electric aircraft work. The award recognizes the "person who has made an outstanding contribution to the advancement of light aircraft design" each year.

The company next developed a new design that was intended for production, an all composite electric aircraft, the ElectraFlyer-X, that was introduced in 2009. The ElectraFlyer-X did not, however, enter production.

The Great Recession caused development of the company products to be delayed. In 2011 Fishman said, "The recession has made this not a great business right now. I have done okay because I have kept it small, selling a few complete trikes and many propulsion kits, meters and electronic controllers for people to modify their own ultralights."

The company developed an electric powered version of the Airsport Song, called the Electric Aircraft Corporation ElectraFlyer-ULS, which was introduced in 2012.

The company also sells the Electra 1, a 14 kW (19 hp) electric motor for ultralight trikes.

== Aircraft ==
Summary of aircraft built by Electric Aircraft Corporation
Model name	First flight	Number built	Type
Electric Aircraft Corporation ElectraFlyer Trike	2007		Electric ultralight trike
Electric Aircraft Corporation ElectraFlyer-C	2008	1	Electric motor glider prototype
Electric Aircraft Corporation ElectraFlyer-X	2009	1	Electric light-sport aircraft
Electric Aircraft Corporation ElectraFlyer-ULS	2012		Electric motor glider
