= Airsport Sonet =

General information
- Type: Ultralight aircraft
- National origin: Czech Republic
- Manufacturer: Airsport
- Status: In production (2015)

History
- Developed from: Airsport Sonata

The Airsport Sonet (English: Sonnet) is a Czech ultralight aircraft, designed and produced by Airsport of Zbraslavice. The aircraft is supplied in complete, ready-to-fly form.

== Design and development ==
The aircraft was derived from the Airsport Sonata motor glider and designed to comply with the Fédération Aéronautique Internationale microlight rules. It features a cantilever low-wing, a T-tail, a two-seats-in-side-by-side configuration enclosed cockpit, fixed tricycle landing gear and a single engine in tractor configuration.

The Sonet is made from composites. Its polyhedral wing comes in three optional spans: 10.2 m (33.5 ft), 11.4 m (37.4 ft) and 15 m (49.2 ft). It requires an engine of about 65 hp (48 kW) and no more than 60 kg (132 lb). Standard engines available are the 64 hp (48 kW) Rotax 582 two-stroke and the 60 hp (45 kW) HKS 700E four-stroke powerplant.

== Specifications (Sonet 11.4) ==
Data from Bayerl and Tacke

General characteristics

- Crew: one
- Capacity: one passenger
- Wingspan: 11.7 m (38 ft 5 in)
- Wing area: 10.5 m^{2} (113 sq ft)
- Empty weight: 265 kg (584 lb)
- Gross weight: 450 kg (992 lb)
- Fuel capacity: 60 litres (13 imp gal; 16 US gal) in two tanks
- Powerplant: 1 × Rotax 582 twin cylinder, liquid air-cooled, two stroke, 48 kW (64 hp)

Performance

- Maximum speed: 201 km/h (125 mph, 109 kn)
- Cruise speed: 140 km/h (87 mph, 76 kn)
- Stall speed: 64 km/h (40 mph, 35 kn)
- Rate of climb: 4 m/s (790 ft/min)
- Wing loading: 42.9 kg/m^{2} (8.8 lb/sq ft)
