= Airsport Song =

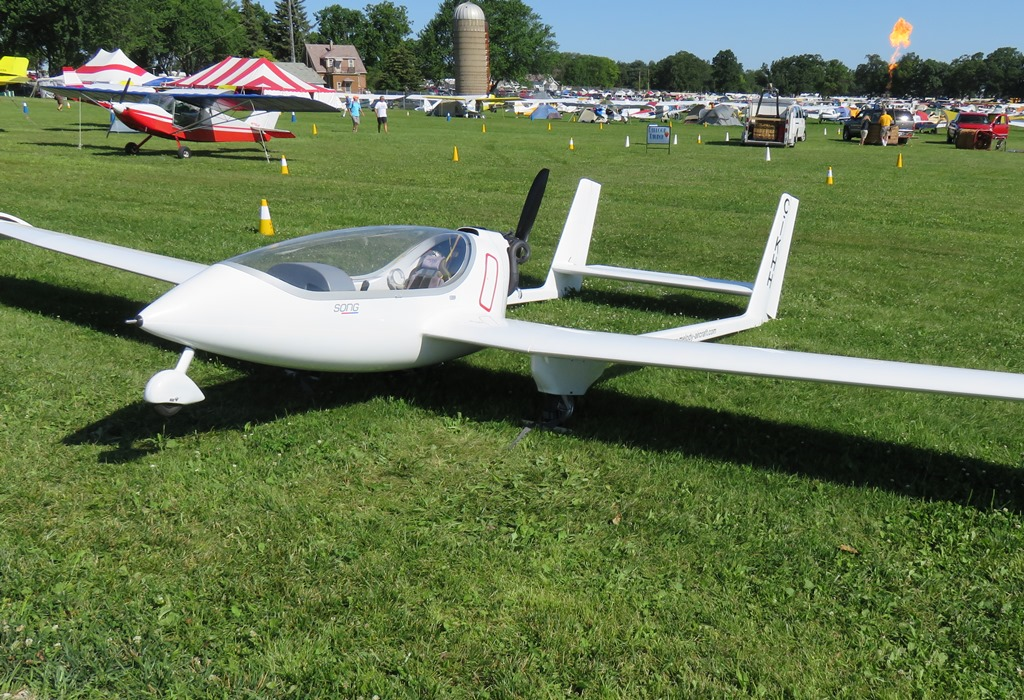

General information
- Type: Ultralight aircraft
- National origin: Czech Republic
- Manufacturer: Airsport
- Designer: Marek Ivanov
- Status: In production

The Airsport Song is a Czech ultralight aircraft, designed by Marek Ivanov and produced by Airsport of Zbraslavice.

== Design and development ==
The aircraft was designed to comply with the LTF-L 120 kg, US FAR 103 Ultralight Vehicles and English SSDR categories. It features a cantilever low-wing, twin-booms, a single seat enclosed cockpit, fixed tricycle landing gear and a single engine in pusher configuration. The Song has been produced in both a twin–tail and inverted V-tail layout. In most configurations, the Song includes a Galaxy GRS 3/270 ballistic parachute rescue system.

The Song is made from composites. Its polyhedral wing comes in two optional spans: 7.5 m (24.6 ft) (with flaperons) and 11.2 m (36.7 ft) (with ailerons and either spoilers or flaps). Standard engines available are the 20.5 hp (15 kW) Bailey V5 four-stroke and the 35 hp (26 kW) Verner JCV 360 four-stroke powerplant.

Randall Fishman of Electric Aircraft Corporation produces an electric-powered version of the Song, the Electric Aircraft Corporation ElectraFlyer-ULS.

== Specifications (Song SW-V) ==
Data from Airsport

General characteristics

- Crew: one
- Length: 5.9 m (19 ft 4 in)
- Wingspan: 11.2 m (36 ft 9 in)
- Wing area: 10.5 m^{2} (113 sq ft)
- Empty weight: 110 kg (243 lb)
- Gross weight: 220 kg (485 lb)
- Fuel capacity: 25 litres (5.5 imp gal; 6.6 US gal)
- Powerplant: 1 × Bailey V5 Single Cylinder, 4 stroke, force air cooled, 2 valves per cylinder, cast alloy, 15.3 kW (20.5 hp)

Performance

- Maximum speed: 201 km/h (125 mph, 109 kn)
- Cruise speed: 80 km/h (50 mph, 43 kn)
- Stall speed: 50 km/h (31 mph, 27 kn)
- Never exceed speed: 140 km/h (87 mph, 76 kn)
- Rate of climb: 1.5 m/s (300 ft/min) with Bailey V5, (5 m/s with Verner JCV 360)
