= Flying Machines FM301 Stream =

Czech ultralight trike

FM301 Stream

General information
- Type: Ultralight trike
- National origin: Czech Republic
- Manufacturer: Flying Machines s.r.o.
- Status: In production (2013)

The Flying Machines FM301 Stream, is a Czech ultralight trike, designed by and produced by Flying Machines s.r.o. of Rasošky. The aircraft is supplied as a complete ready-to-fly-aircraft.

== Design and development ==
The FM301 was designed to comply with the Fédération Aéronautique Internationale microlight category, including the category's maximum gross weight of 450 kg (992 lb). It features a cable-braced hang glider-style high-wing, weight-shift controls, a two-seats-in-tandem open cockpit with a cockpit fairing, tricycle landing gear and a single engine in pusher configuration.

The aircraft is made with a monocoque fibreglass carriage, with its double surface wing covered in Dacron sailcloth. Its 9.5 m (31.2 ft) span Quasar wing is supported by a single tube-type kingpost and uses an "A" frame weight-shift control bar. The powerplant is a twin cylinder, air-cooled, four-stroke, dual-ignition 60 hp (45 kW) HKS 700E engine, with the two-stroke 64 hp (48 kW) Rotax 582 and the four cylinder, air and liquid-cooled, four-stroke, dual-ignition 80 hp (60 kW) Rotax 912UL or 100 hp (75 kW) Rotax 912ULS engines optional. With the HKS powerplant the aircraft has an empty weight of 175 kg (386 lb) and a gross weight of 450 kg (992 lb), giving a useful load of 275 kg (606 lb). With full fuel of 42 litres (9.2 imp gal; 11 US gal) the payload is 245 kg (540 lb).

The unusual fibreglass structural construction allows internal fuel tanks and also permits a large unobstructed baggage area. The FM301 also has a unique wing mast system that allows the wing to be assembled and mounted on the carriage single-handedly.

== Specifications (FM301) ==
Data from Bayerl and Flying Machines

General characteristics

- Crew: one
- Capacity: one passenger
- Wingspan: 9.5 m (31 ft 2 in)
- Wing area: 15.4 m^{2} (166 sq ft)
- Empty weight: 175 kg (386 lb)
- Gross weight: 450 kg (992 lb)
- Fuel capacity: 42 litres (9.2 imp gal; 11 US gal)
- Powerplant: 1 × HKS 700E twin cylinder, air-cooled, four stroke aircraft engine, 45 kW (60 hp)
- Propellers: 3-bladed composite

Performance

- Maximum speed: 135 km/h (84 mph, 73 kn)
- Cruise speed: 100 km/h (62 mph, 54 kn)
- Stall speed: 52 km/h (32 mph, 28 kn)
- Never exceed speed: 140 km/h (87 mph, 76 kn)
- Maximum glide ratio: 9:1
- Rate of climb: 6 m/s (1,200 ft/min)
- Wing loading: 29.2 kg/m^{2} (6.0 lb/sq ft)
