= InterPlane Aircraft =

Defunct Czech small aircraft company

InterPlane Aircraft sro
- Type: Privately held company
- Industry: Aerospace
- Founded: 1992
- Defunct: late 2013
- Fate: Out of business
- Headquarters: Zbraslavice, Czech Republic
- Products: Ultralight aircraft
- Website: www.interplaneaircraft.com - former location

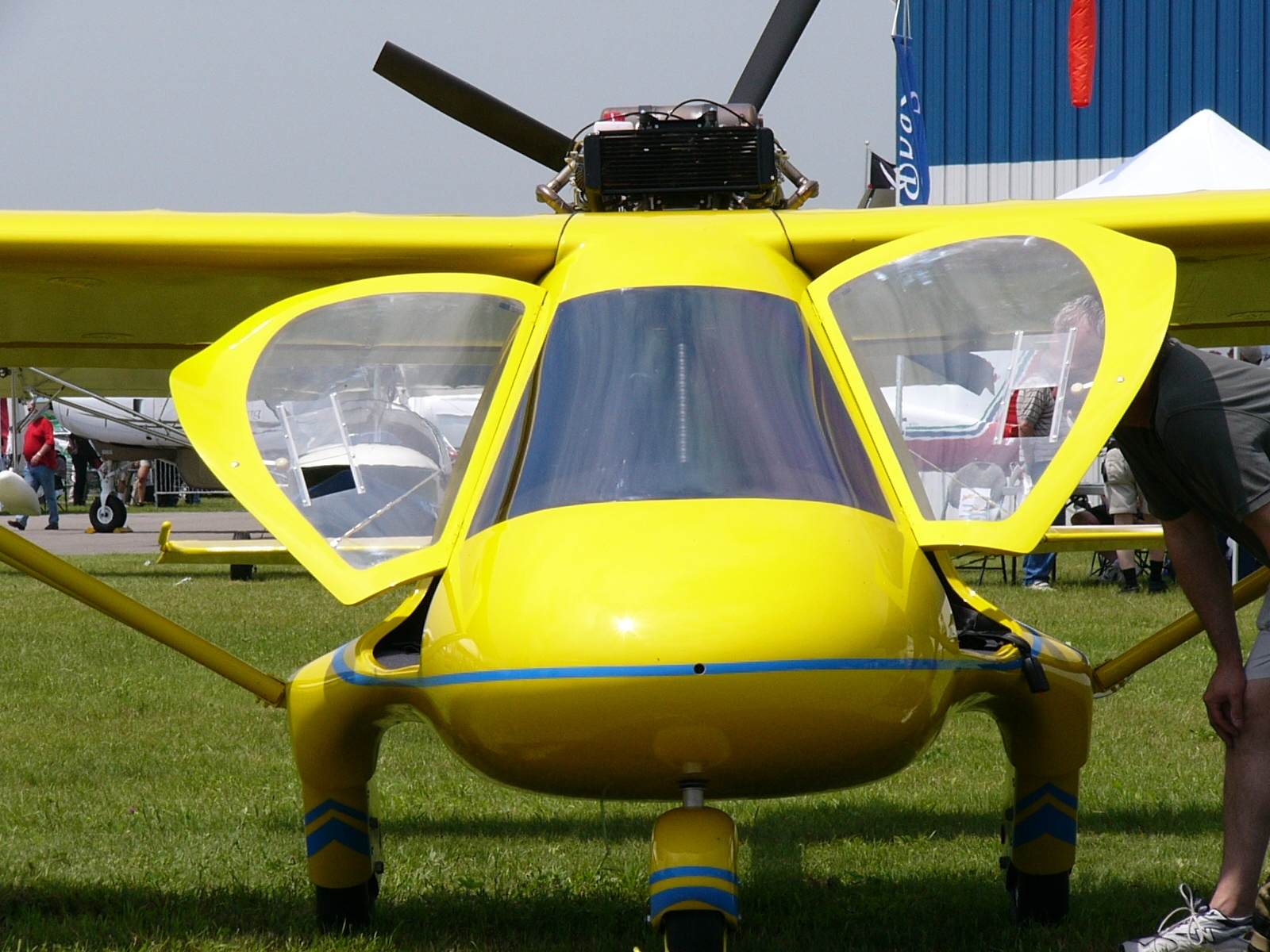
InterPlane Skyboy

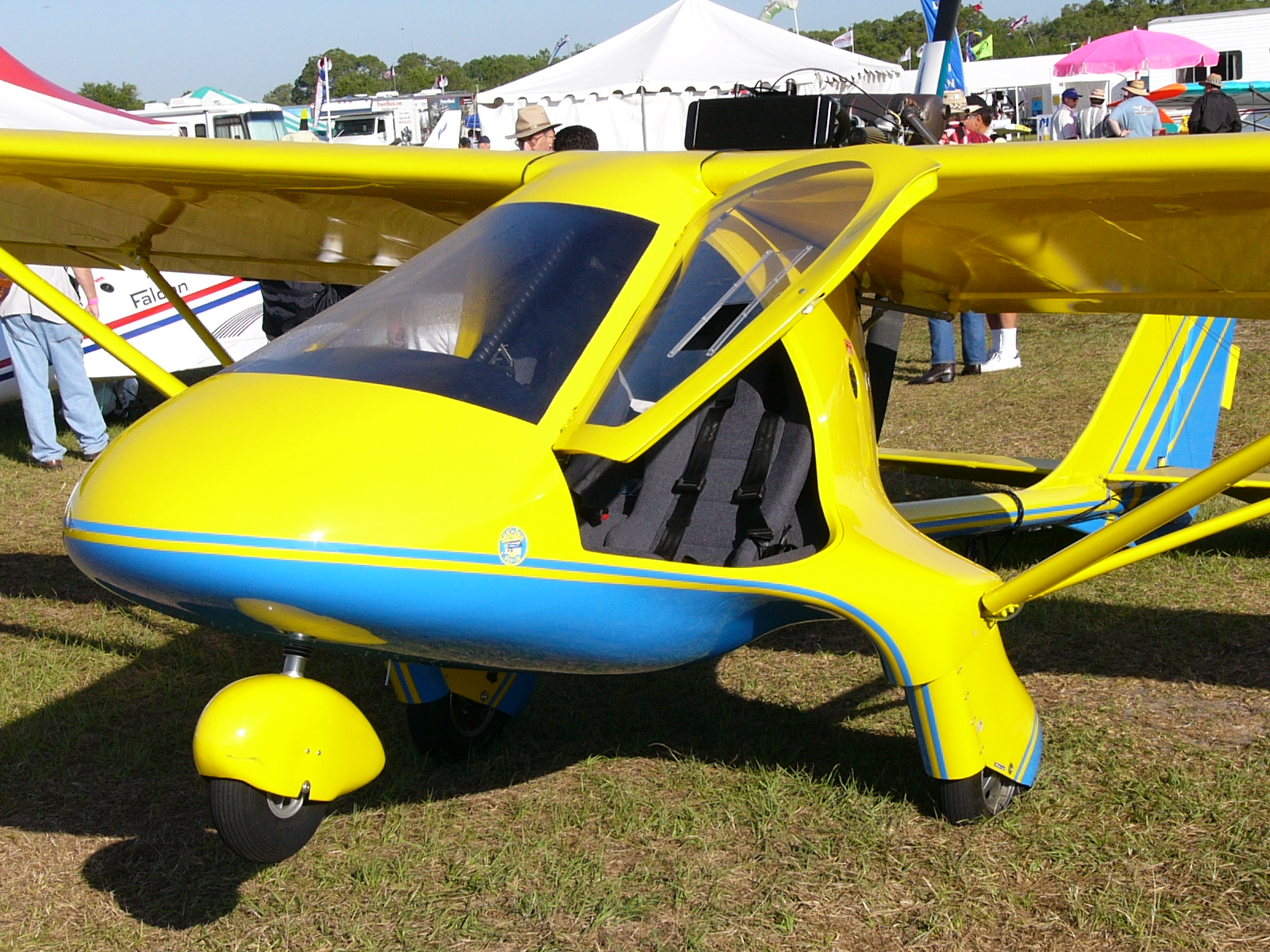
InterPlane Skyboy

InterPlane Aircraft sro, also called InterPlane Aircraft, Inc., was a Czech aircraft manufacturer based in Zbraslavice and founded in 1992. The company specialized in the design and manufacture of ultralight aircraft in the form of kits for amateur construction and ready-to-fly aircraft in the US FAR 103 Ultralight Vehicles rules, the European Fédération Aéronautique Internationale microlight and the American light-sport aircraft categories.

The company was a Společnost s ručením omezeným (sro), a Czech private limited company, although the company referred to itself as InterPlane Aircraft, Inc..

In 2013 the company announced that it was seeking a buyer for the business and its hangar and facilities. By the end of that year the company seems to have gone out of business.

== Products ==
The company's first design, introduced in 1992, was the InterPlane Griffon, a single-seat, strut-braced, high wing kit plane for the US FAR 103 Ultralight Vehicles category. The same year the company introduced the two seats in side-by-side configuration, strut-braced high wing InterPlane Skyboy, which was supplied only as a complete ready to fly aircraft. The Skyboy was accepted as a US light-sport aircraft and in Canada as an Advanced Ultralight Aeroplane.

The company also sold the InterPlane ZJ-Viera, a single seat, low wing, lightweight, low cost airplane made predominantly from composites. It was designed by Marek Ivanov, manufactured by Ivanov Aero and fit the US FAR 103 Ultralight Vehicles category. The company incorporated a photo of the aircraft into its logo.

In the late 1990s the company proposed a low-wing metal and composite two seater to be called the InterPlane Starboy, but it appears to have not been flown.

== Aircraft ==
Summary of aircraft built by InterPlane Aircraft
Model name	First flight	Number built	Type
InterPlane Griffon	1992	15 (1998)	Single-seat, strut-braced, high wing kit plane
InterPlane Skyboy	1992	100	Two-seat, strut-braced, high wing aircraft
InterPlane ZJ-Viera	2008		Single-seat, low wing ultralight
