= Ivanov Aero =

Czech aircraft manufacturer

Ivanov Aero sro
- Company type: Privately held company
- Industry: Aerospace
- Founded: c. 2008
- Founder: Marek Ivanov
- Defunct: 2016
- Headquarters: Hradec Králové, Czech Republic
- Products: ultralight aircraft
- Website: www.ivanovaero.cz

Ivanov Aero sro, sometimes called Ivanov Aircraft, was a Czech aircraft manufacturer based in Hradec Králové and founded by Marek Ivanov. The company specialized in the design and manufacture of ultralight aircraft in the form of kits for amateur construction and ready-to-fly aircraft.

The company seems to have been founded about 2008 and gone out of business in 2016.

The company was a Společnost s ručením omezeným (sro), a Czech private limited company.

Ivanov Aero was formed to develop and produce the Ivanov ZJ-Viera, a single seat ultralight aircraft made from composite materials. Reviewer Marino Boric described the aircraft in a 2015 review, saying, "the dream of ultralighting returns, but with a 21st century feel! Ultralight on the wallet, too, thanks to a combination of simple design and modern all-composite construction...this airplane shows every sign of becoming a landmark design".

Another Czech aircraft manufacturer, InterPlane Aircraft of Zbraslavice, acted as distributor for the ZJ-Viera, marketing it for the US FAR 103 Ultralight Vehicles category, as well as the light-sport aircraft category, before they went out of business in late 2013.

Ivanov Aero also provided services for design studies and engineering, documentation, structural testing, prototyping, aircraft maintenance and repairs and production of aircraft and aircraft parts.

== Aircraft ==
Summary of aircraft built by Ivanov Aero:

- Ivanov ZJ-Viera (2008)
