= Electric Aircraft Corporation ElectraFlyer-ULS =

American motor glider

ElectraFlyer-ULS

General information
- Type: Ultralight motor glider
- National origin: United States
- Manufacturer: Electric Aircraft Corporation
- Designer: Randell Fishman
- Status: In production (2017)

History
- Introduction date: 2012

The Electric Aircraft Corporation ElectraFlyer-ULS is an American electric ultralight motor glider, designed by Randell Fishman and produced by the Electric Aircraft Corporation of Cliffside Park, New Jersey, introduced in late 2012. The aircraft is supplied complete and ready-to-fly.

== Design and development ==
The ElectraFlyer-ULS was designed to comply with the US FAR 103 Ultralight Vehicles rules, including the category's 254 lb (115 kg) empty weight limit. The design has an empty weight of 245 lb (111 kg).

The design features a cantilever mid-wing, a single-seat under a bubble canopy, a twin boom tail, fixed tricycle landing gear and a single electric motor in pusher configuration.

The aircraft is made from carbon fiber and foam composite materials. The motor and drive train are supplied by the Electric Aircraft Corporation in the US, while the airframe is built under contract by Airsport in the Czech Republic and is adapted from an existing design, the Airsport Song.

The drivetrain includes a Fishman-designed 20 hp (15 kW) motor, electronic controller and 3.3 kWh LiPo battery pack. An additional 3.3 kWh battery pack is a US$5,000 option, which gives a two-hour endurance. A two-bladed fixed pitch propeller is standard equipment, but a folding carbon fiber propeller is optional.

== Specifications (ElectraFlyer-ULS) ==
Data from Tacke and manufacturer

General characteristics

- Crew: one
- Empty weight: 245 lb (111 kg)
- Gross weight: 525 lb (238 kg)
- Powerplant: 1 × Fishman electric aircraft engine, powered by one 3.3 kWh Lithium polymer battery pack standard or two 3.3 kWh optional, 20 hp (15 kW)
- Propellers: 2-bladed composite, fixed pitch

Performance

- Cruise speed: 40 mph (64 km/h, 35 kn)
- Endurance: 2 hours (with two battery packs)
- Maximum glide ratio: 20:1
- Rate of sink: 236 ft/min (1.20 m/s)
