= Electric Aircraft Corporation ElectraFlyer-C =

American homebuilt electric aircraft

ElectraFlyer-C

General information
- Type: Experimental electric aircraft
- National origin: United States
- Manufacturer: Electric Aircraft Corporation
- Designer: Randall Fishman
- Status: Developmental prototype only
- Number built: one

History
- Manufactured: 2008
- Introduction date: 2008
- First flight: 2008
- Developed from: Electric Aircraft Corporation ElectraFlyer Trike and Monnett Moni

The Electric Aircraft Corporation ElectraFlyer-C is an American experimental electric aircraft that was designed by Randall Fishman and produced by his company Electric Aircraft Corporation in 2008. The aircraft is a converted Monnett Moni motor glider intended to test electric propulsion technology for the future Electric Aircraft Corporation ElectraFlyer-X.

The design was only intended as a prototype and proof of concept aircraft.

== Design and development ==
The aircraft features a cantilever low-wing, a single-seat enclosed cockpit with a bubble canopy, fixed conventional landing gear and a single 18 hp (13 kW) electric motor in tractor configuration. The sole example built is registered in the US Experimental - Amateur-built category.

Constructed from a Monnett Moni motorglider with taildragger landing gear, the original fuselage and wing were retained, but the tail section and tailwheel were extended to improve control on the ground, and to elevate the fuselage.

The aircraft is made from sheet aluminum. Its 45.6 ft (13.9 m) span wing has an area of 157 sq ft (14.6 m^{2}).

The motor is an 18-horsepower ElectraFlyer direct-drive propulsion kit DC electric motor, powered by a pair of custom-made 5.6 kwh lithium-ion polymer battery packs, weighing 75 pounds (34 kilograms). The batteries are mounted in custom-made, ceramic-stainless steel firewall boxes, sized to fit the space available in the fuselage.

The motor returns an 88% efficiency (90% at cruise), with the motor controller consuming 2% of the power. The batteries fitted give an endurance of 1.5 hours and take six hours to recharge at a cost of 70 cents for the power consumed. While descending the propeller generates power to recharge the batteries. The ElectraFlyer-C received its airworthiness certificate on 11 April 2008.

Fishman indicated that he would sell the aircraft in April 2009, but as of February 2017 it remains owned by his company.

== Specifications (ElectraFlyer-C) ==
Data from Bayerl and Electric Aircraft Corporation

General characteristics

- Crew: one
- Height: 45 ft 7 in (13.9 m)
- Wing area: 157 sq ft (14.6 m^{2})
- Empty weight: 380 lb (172 kg)
- Gross weight: 625 lb (283 kg)
- Powerplant: 1 × ElectraFlyer direct drive electric aircraft engine, with 5.6 kwh lithium-ion polymer batteries, 18 hp (13 kW)

Performance

- Maximum speed: 90 mph (140 km/h, 78 kn)
- Cruise speed: 70 mph (110 km/h, 61 kn)
- Stall speed: 40 mph (65 km/h, 35 kn)
- Endurance: 1.5 hours
