= Guêpe =

Guêpe or La Guêpe (French "The Wasp") may refer to:

== Books and publications ==
- La Guêpe, a Canadian humour journal published 1857–1861
- La Guêpe, a 1934 novel by Albert Touchard
- La Guêpe, a 1943 poem by Francis Ponge

== Film and TV ==
- La Guêpe (film), a 1986 Canadian film by Gilles Carle
- La Guêpe, a 1965 French TV film by François Leterrier

== Transportation ==
- La Guêpe (aircraft), French ultralight aircraft
- La Guêpe (ship), privateer captured by the Royal Navy in 1800, then HMS Wasp

== Other uses ==
- Arthur Guepe (1915–2001), American football player and head coach at the University of Virginia
- Guêpe-class submarine, a class of French attack submarines
