= Flying Machines FM250 Vampire =

Czech ultralight aircraft

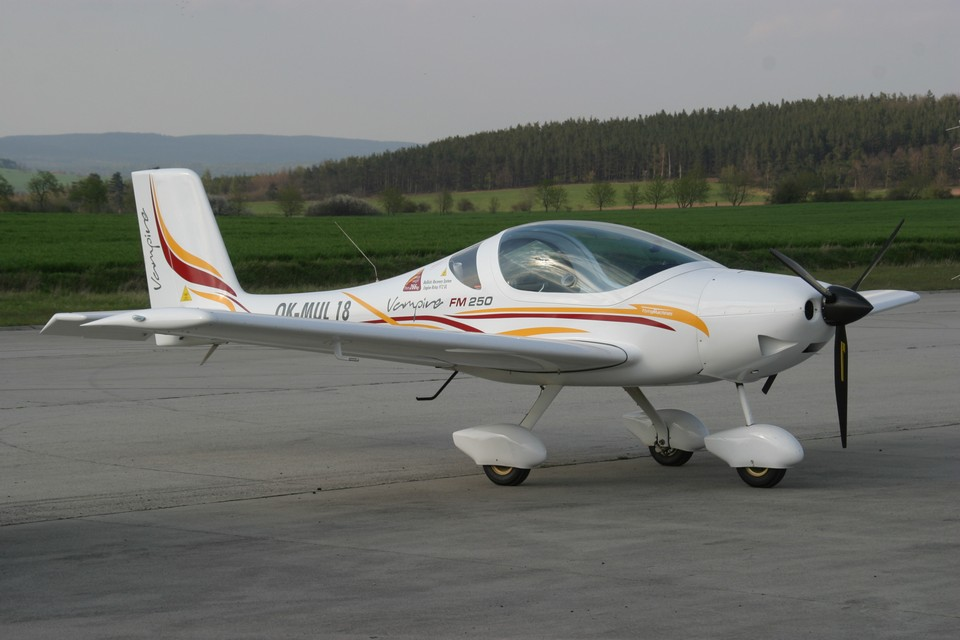
- FM250 Vampire

General information
- Type: Ultralight aircraft and Light-sport aircraft
- National origin: Czech Republic
- Manufacturer: Flying Machines s.r.o.
- Status: In production

History
- Introduction date: 2007

The Flying Machines FM250 Vampire is a Czech ultralight and light-sport aircraft, designed and produced by Flying Machines s.r.o. of Rasošky, introduced at the Sport Aircraft Show held in Sebring, Florida in 2007. The aircraft is supplied as a complete ready-to-fly-aircraft.

== Design and development ==
The aircraft was designed to comply with the Fédération Aéronautique Internationale microlight rules and US light-sport aircraft rules. It features a cantilever low-wing, a two-seats-in-side-by-side configuration enclosed cockpit under a bubble canopy that hinges forward, fixed tricycle landing gear and a single engine in tractor configuration.

The aircraft is made from composite materials and features a wet wing. Its 7.8 m (25.6 ft) span wing has an area of 10.05 m^{2} (108.2 sq ft) and flaps. Standard engines available are the 80 hp (60 kW) Rotax 912UL or the 100 hp (75 kW) Rotax 912ULS four-stroke powerplant. Full dual controls are provided, with the exception of wheel brakes, which are left seat only.

== Variants ==
FM250 Vampire
Original model, introduced in 2007
FM250 Vampire II
Improved model, introduced in 2011.
FM250 Mystique
Model for the US light-sport aircraft category, with longer wings. The Mystique is a Federal Aviation Administration approved special light-sport aircraft.

== Specifications (FM250 Vampire II) ==
Data from Bayerl and Flying Machines

General characteristics

- Crew: one
- Capacity: one passenger
- Length: 6.32 m (20 ft 9 in)
- Wingspan: 7.8 m (25 ft 7 in)
- Height: 2.18 m (7 ft 2 in)
- Wing area: 10.05 m^{2} (108.2 sq ft)
- Empty weight: 266 kg (586 lb)
- Gross weight: 472.5 kg (1,042 lb)
- Fuel capacity: 100 litres (22 imp gal; 26 US gal)
- Powerplant: 1 × Rotax 912ULS four cylinder, liquid and air-cooled, four stroke aircraft engine, 75 kW (101 hp)

Performance

- Maximum speed: 250 km/h (160 mph, 130 kn)
- Cruise speed: 220 km/h (140 mph, 120 kn)
- Stall speed: 65 km/h (40 mph, 35 kn) flaps down
- Never exceed speed: 270 km/h (170 mph, 150 kn)
- Range: 1,200 km (750 mi, 650 nmi)
- Rate of climb: 7 m/s (1,400 ft/min)
- Wing loading: 47.01 kg/m^{2} (9.63 lb/sq ft)
