= Bailey V5 =

Bailey V5 may refer to:

- Bailey V5 engine
- Bailey V5 paramotor
