= InterPlane Skyboy =

Skyboy
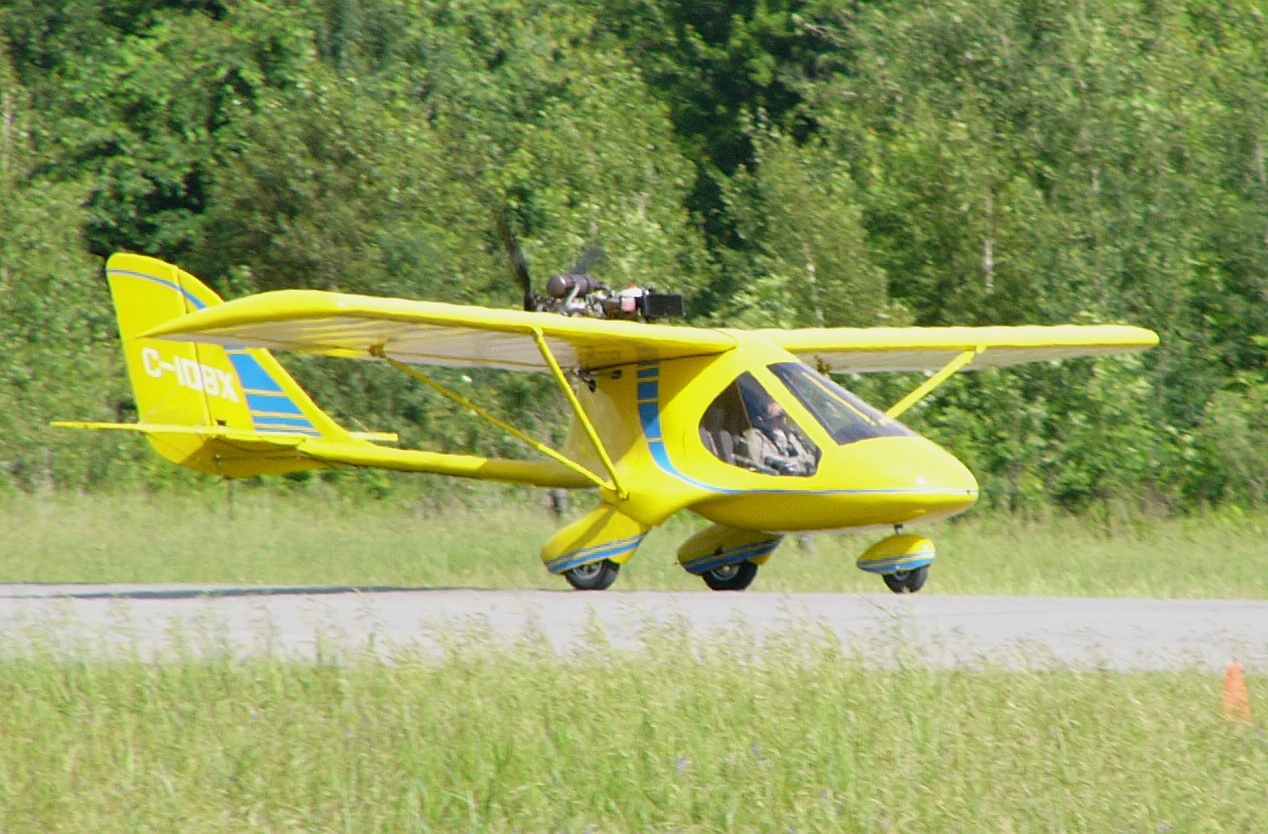

General information
- Type: Ultralight aircraft & Light-sport aircraft
- National origin: Czech Republic
- Manufacturer: InterPlane Aircraft
- Status: Production completed
- Number built: 100

History
- Introduction date: 1992
- First flight: 1992

The InterPlane Skyboy is a two-seat, side-by-side, high wing, single engine, pusher configuration ultralight aircraft that was manufactured as a completed aircraft by InterPlane Aircraft of Zbraslavice, Czech Republic.

== Design and development ==
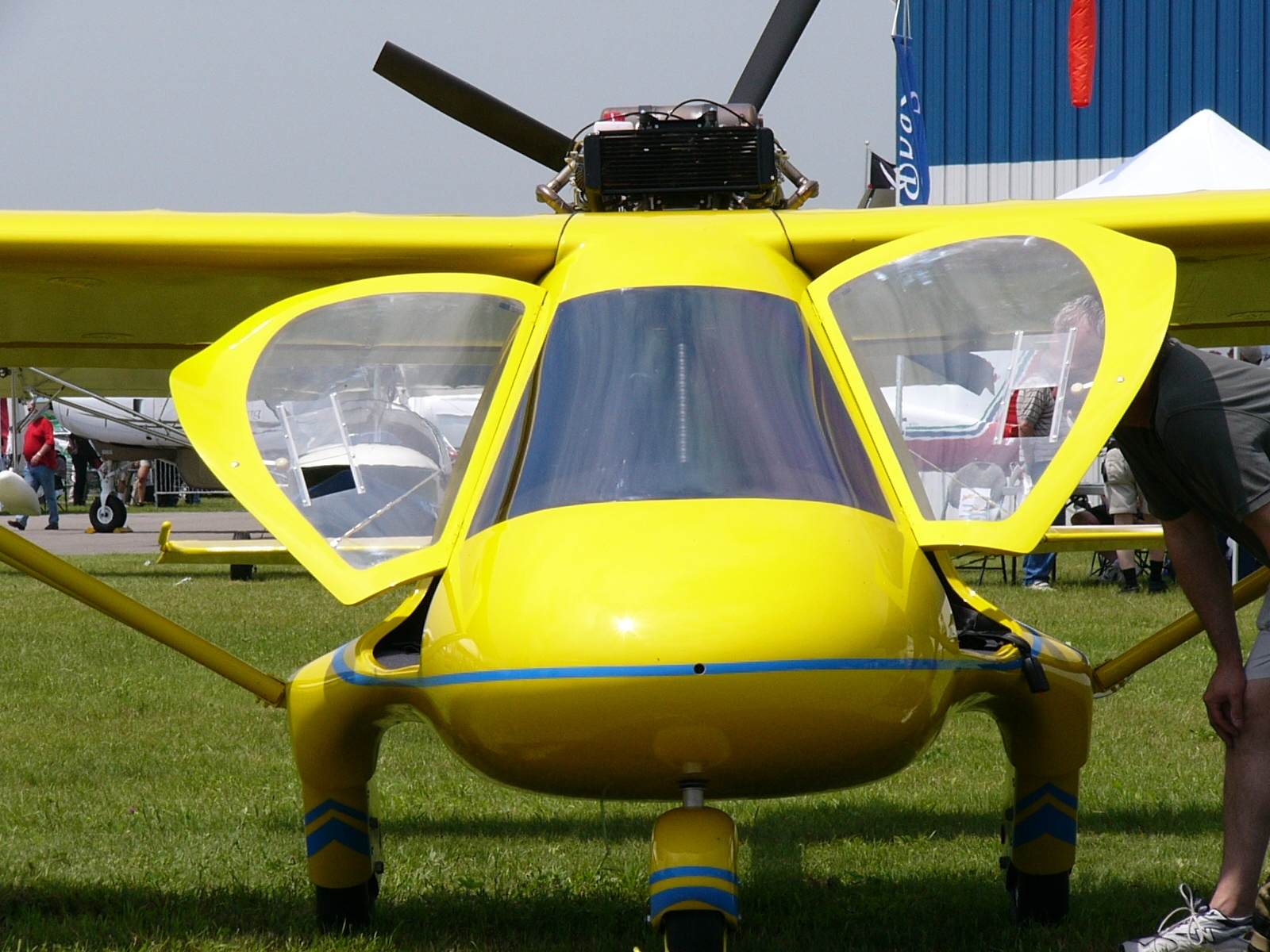
Interplane Skyboy - front view showing the unusual main landing gear

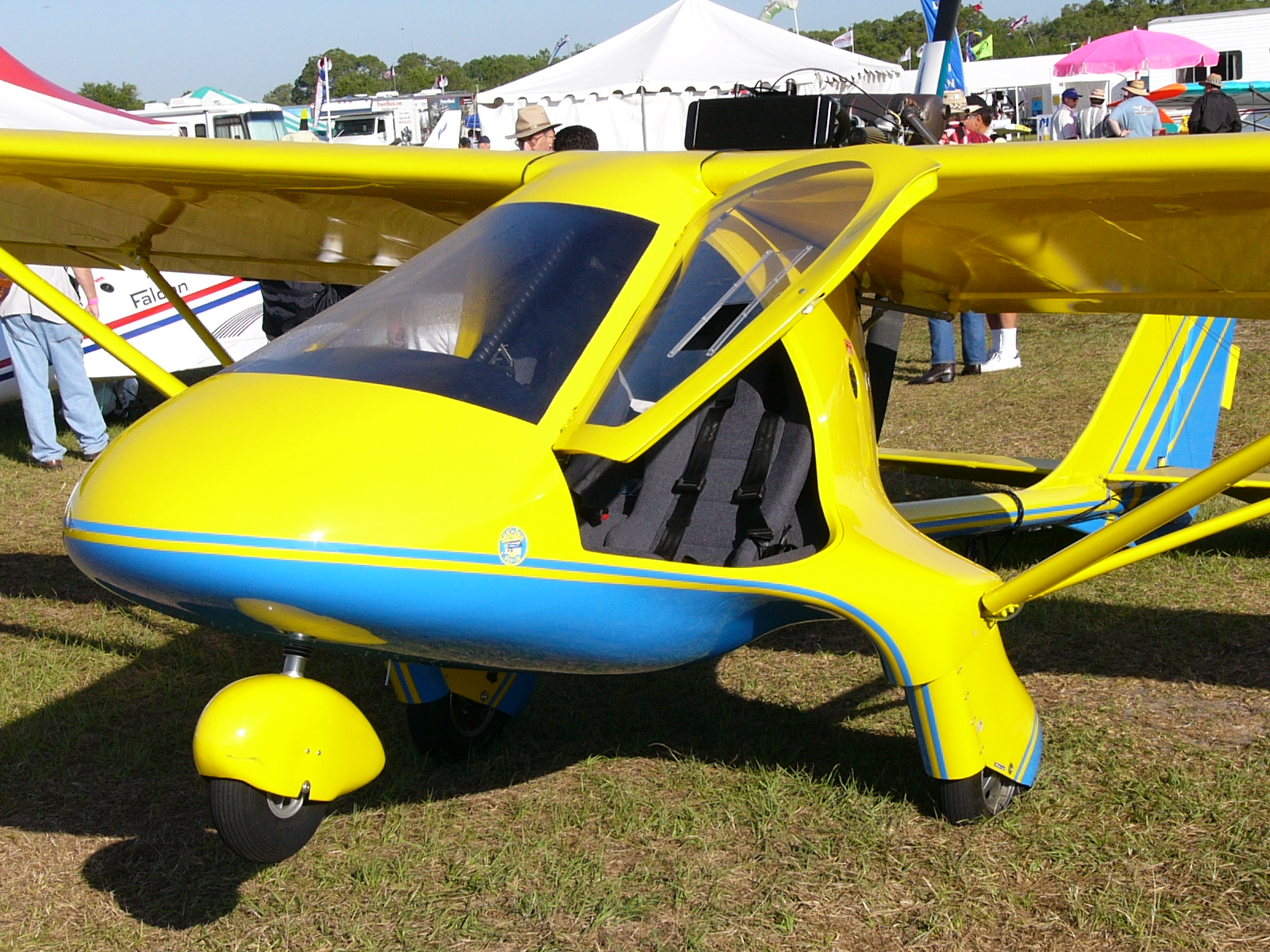
Interplane Skyboy - showing doors and interior accommodation

The Skyboy was designed in 1992 specifically for the German market as a trainer. It was adapted for the US FAR 103 Ultralight Vehicles category for use as a two-seat trainer under the FAR 103 trainer exemption. It later became available as a US light-sport aircraft. The aircraft is available in Canada as an Advanced Ultralight Aeroplane.

The Skyboy wing is built from aluminum extrusions for the spars and wing ribs and covered with doped aircraft fabric. The wing's leading edge is Mylar covered in fabric, to increase stiffness. The wing is supported by "V" struts and utilizes jury struts. The fuselage is built upon an aluminum main tube that runs from the tail right to the rudder pedals. The wings and horizontal tail surfaces can be folded for trailering or storage. The cabin is constructed from two fibreglass shells, joined together. The rear of the cabin is covered in aircraft fabric. The optional cabin doors open upwards.

Controls are conventional three-axis. The control stick is a centrally mounted "Y" stick, between the two seats that can be used from either seat.

The Skyboy has a distinctive main landing gear, consisting of a trailing idler link, with suspension consisting of a coil spring mounted over a shock absorber. The company describes the main landing gear: "one of the best landing gears in the market (makes bad landings look good)".

The available engines include the 48 kW (64 hp) Rotax 582, 60 kW (80 hp) Rotax 912, 75 kW (100 hp) Rotax 912S and the 63 kW (85 hp) Jabiru 2200. The 37 kW (50 hp) Rotax 503 was available at the beginning of production, but did not provide adequate performance.

The Skyboy has never been available as a kit aircraft, but only as a factory-complete, ready-to-fly product. Labour wage levels in the Czech Republic have meant that its price has been generally similar to buying unassembled kits for North American buyers. In 2008 the completed Skyboy base model sold for about US$60,000.

== Operational history ==
Aside from its flight training and recreational aircraft roles, the Skyboy has been employed in South Africa for surveillance duties, in Australia for professional aerial photography and in Mexico for tourist sightseeing flights.

== Variants ==
Skyboy UL
To stay below the exemption's 225 kg (496 lb) empty weight limit the aircraft was marketed without cabin doors, wheel pants and hydraulic brakes, using mechanical brakes instead and with a 410 kg (904 lb) gross weight. The initial engine was the 37 kW (50 hp) Rotax 503 and later the 48 kW (64 hp) Rotax 582.
Skyboy S
Higher 559 kg (1,232 lb) gross weight version for Europe and Canada, with the 48 kW (64 hp) Rotax 582 or larger engines.
Skyboy ZK
450 kg (1,000 lb) gross weight version, with the 48 kW (64 hp)} Rotax 582 engine.

== Specifications (Skyboy S) ==
Data from Purdy, Cliche & InterPlane

General characteristics

- Crew: one
- Capacity: one passenger
- Length: 20 ft 0 in (6.10 m)
- Wingspan: 34 ft 5 in (10.49 m)
- Wing area: 163.6 sq ft (15.20 m^{2})
- Empty weight: 490 lb (222 kg)
- Gross weight: 1,000 lb (454 kg)
- Fuel capacity: 10 US gallons (38 litres)
- Powerplant: 1 × Rotax 582 twin cylinder two-stroke aircraft engine, 64 hp (48 kW)

Performance

- Maximum speed: 90 mph (140 km/h, 78 kn)
- Cruise speed: 68 mph (109 km/h, 59 kn)
- Stall speed: 40 mph (64 km/h, 35 kn)
- Never exceed speed: 128 mph (206 km/h, 111 kn)
- Range: 200 mi (320 km, 170 nmi)
- Service ceiling: 9,000 ft (2,700 m)
- Maximum glide ratio: 7:1
- Rate of climb: 630 ft/min (3.2 m/s)

== See also ==
Aircraft of comparable role, configuration, and era

- Birdman WT-11 Chinook
- Spectrum RX-28 Beaver

== Bibliography ==
Notes

References

- Purdy, Don (1998). AeroCrafter homebuilt aircraft sourcebook (1998 ed.). Bai Communications. ISBN 0-9636409-4-1. - Total pages: 432
- Cliche, André (1996). Ultralight aircraft reference guide (1996 ed.). Cybair. ISBN 0-9680628-1-4. - Total pages: 310
