= InterPlane Starboy =

Czech homebuilt aircraft

Starboy
- Artist's three-view rendering of the InterPlane Starboy

General information
- Type: Homebuilt aircraft
- National origin: Czech Republic
- Manufacturer: InterPlane Aircraft
- Status: Proposed (1998)
- Number built: None

The InterPlane Starboy was a proposed Czech homebuilt aircraft designed by InterPlane Aircraft of Zbraslavice. The aircraft was intended to be supplied as a complete ready-to-fly-aircraft or as a kit for amateur construction, but it has seemingly never entered production.

== Design and development ==
The Starboy design featured a cantilever low-wing, a two-seats-in-side-by-side configuration enclosed cockpit under a bubble canopy, fixed tricycle landing gear with wheel pants and a single engine in tractor configuration.

The aircraft was to have been constructed of a combination of aluminum and composite materials. Its 8.0 m (26.2 ft) span wing would have had a wing area of 12.41 m^{2} (133.6 sq ft). The standard engine proposed was the 80 hp (60 kW) Rotax 912UL.

The aircraft was to have a typical empty weight of 245 kg (540 lb) and a gross weight of 450 kg (990 lb), giving a useful load of 205 kg (452 lb). With full fuel of 50 litres (11 imp gal; 13 US gal) the payload for pilot, passenger and baggage would have been 169 kg (373 lb).

The manufacturer estimated the construction time from the planned kit as 500 hours.

== Specifications (Starboy) ==
Data from AeroCrafter

General characteristics

- Crew: one
- Capacity: one passenger
- Length: 7.56 m (24.80 ft)
- Wingspan: 10.49 m (34.40 ft)
- Wing area: 12.41 m^{2} (133.6 sq ft)
- Aspect ratio: 8.8:1
- Empty weight: 245 kg (540 lb)
- Gross weight: 450 kg (992 lb)
- Fuel capacity: 50 litres (11 imp gal; 13 US gal)
- Powerplant: 1 × Rotax 912UL four cylinder, air and liquid-cooled, four stroke aircraft engine, 60 kW (80 hp)

Performance

- Maximum speed: 220 km/h (137 mph, 119 kn)
- Cruise speed: 150 km/h (93 mph, 81 kn)
- Stall speed: 55 km/h (34 mph, 30 kn)
- Rate of climb: 7.04 m/s (1,386 ft/min)
- Wing loading: 36 kg/m^{2} (7.4 lb/sq ft)
