= InterPlane Griffon =

Czech single engine aircraft

Griffon

General information
- Type: Ultralight aircraft
- National origin: Czech Republic
- Manufacturer: InterPlane Aircraft
- Status: Production completed
- Number built: 15 (1998)

History
- Introduction date: 1992

The InterPlane Griffon is a single seat, high wing, single engine, pusher configuration, tricycle gear ultralight aircraft, that was produced in kit form from InterPlane Aircraft of Zbraslavice, Czech Republic.

== Development ==
The Griffon was the first design produced by InterPlane when they opened for business in 1992. The Griffon was designed for the requirements of the US FAR 103 Ultralight Vehicles category, including that category's maximum 254 lb (115 kg) empty weight.

The Griffon airframe is constructed from aluminum tubing, with the wings and tail covered with doped aircraft fabric. The wing is supported by a "V" strut and utilizes jury struts. It features a three tube tail that allows the pusher propeller to be located in between the tail booms. Standard features supplied included brakes, electric starting, wheel pants, elevator trim system and a plastic cockpit pod fairing with a windshield. The wings and tail surfaces can be folded for trailering or storage.

Available engines included the 40 hp (30 kW) Rotax 447 and the 50 hp (37 kW) Rotax 503.

== Variants ==
Griffon
Basic version equipped with 40 hp (30 kW) Rotax 447, empty weight 254 lb (115 kg).
Griffon EX
Deluxe version equipped with 50 hp (37 kW) Rotax 503, empty weight 342 lb (155 kg).

== Specifications (Griffon EX) ==
Data from Aerocrafter & Cliche

General characteristics

- Crew: one
- Length: 18 ft 9 in (5.72 m)
- Wingspan: 32 ft 11 in (10.03 m)
- Height: 7 ft 2 in (2.18 m)
- Wing area: 150.3 sq ft (13.96 m^{2})
- Empty weight: 342 lb (155 kg)
- Gross weight: 606 lb (275 kg)
- Fuel capacity: 5 US gallons (19 litres)
- Powerplant: 1 × Rotax 503 twin cylinder two-stroke aircraft engine, 50 hp (37 kW)

Performance

- Maximum speed: 87 mph (140 km/h, 76 kn)
- Cruise speed: 59 mph (95 km/h, 51 kn)
- Stall speed: 30 mph (48 km/h, 26 kn)
- Never exceed speed: 90 mph (140 km/h, 78 kn)
- Range: 124 mi (200 km, 108 nmi)
- Rate of climb: 1,181 ft/min (6.00 m/s)
- Wing loading: 4.0 lb/sq ft (20 kg/m^{2})

== See also ==
Aircraft of comparable role, configuration, and era

- Aero-Works Aerolite 103
- Beaujon Mach .07
- Beaujon Enduro
- Birdman WT-11 Chinook
- ISON Airbike
- Spectrum RX-28 Beaver
