= Flying Machines s.r.o. =

Czech aircraft manufacturer

Flying machines s.r.o.
- Company type: Privately held company
- Industry: Aerospace
- Founded: 2004
- Headquarters: Czech Republic
- Products: Light aircraft Ultralight aircraft
- Website: flyingmachines.cz

Flying machines s.r.o. is a Czech manufacturer of light aircraft headquartered in Rasošky. Founded in 2004, the company specializes in producing kit aircraft for amateur construction and ultralight trikes.

== Aircraft ==
Products include:

- FM250 Vampire light sport aircraft.
- FM250 Mystique light sport aircraft.
- FM301 Stream ultralight.
- B612 single-seat light aircraft.
