= Club ULM Rotor Ptenets-2 =

Russian ultralight airplane

Ptenets-2
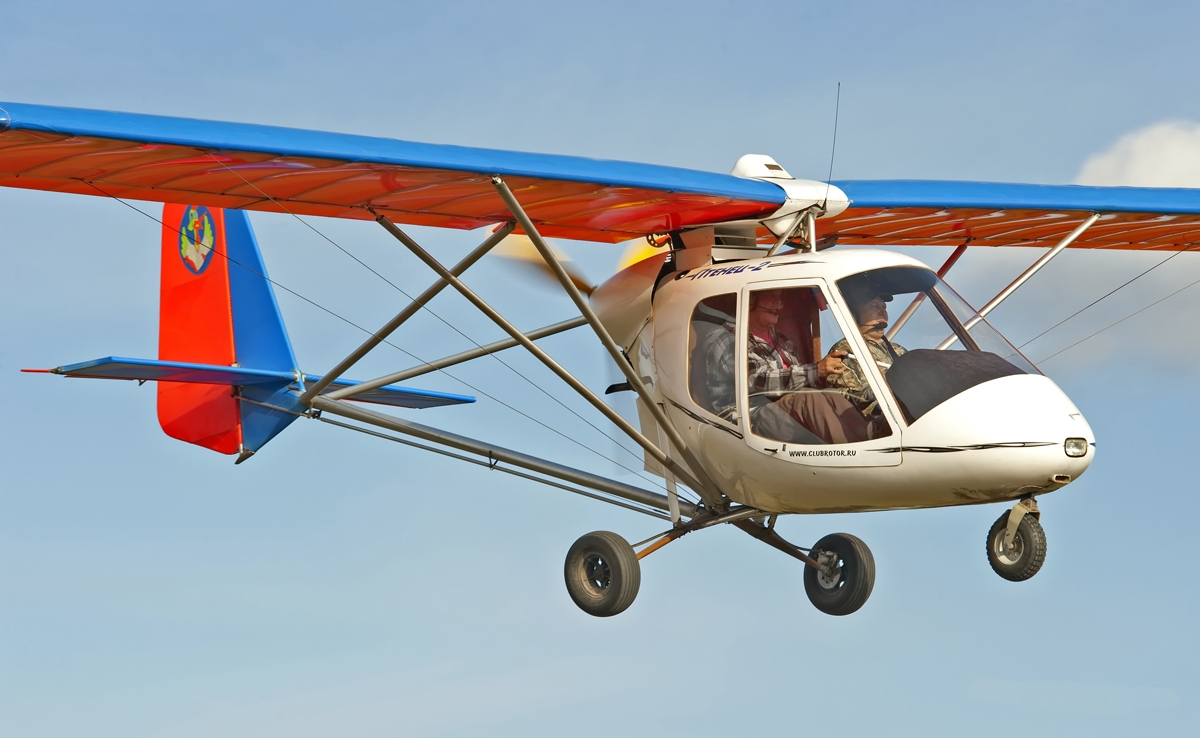

General information
- Type: Ultralight aircraft
- National origin: Russia
- Manufacturer: Club ULM Rotor
- Status: In production

The Club ULM Rotor Ptenets-2 (Russian: Птенец-2, English: Chick or Fledgling) is a Russian ultralight aircraft, designed and produced by Club ULM Rotor of Kumertau, Bashkortostan. The aircraft is supplied complete and ready-to-fly.

== Design and development ==
The aircraft was designed to comply with the Fédération Aéronautique Internationale microlight rules. It features a strut-braced high-wing, a two-seats-in-side-by-side configuration enclosed cockpit, fixed tricycle landing gear and a single engine in pusher configuration.

The aircraft is made from aluminum tubing, with its flying surfaces covered in Dacron sailcloth. The fuselage is made from fibreglass. Its 10.2 m (33.5 ft) span wing has an area of 12.7 m^{2} (137 sq ft). The tail is supported by four tubes that allow space for the pusher propeller. Standard engines available are the 50 hp (37 kW) Rotax 503 and 64 hp (48 kW) Rotax 582 two-strokes and the 60 hp (45 kW) HKS 700E four-stroke powerplant.

== Specifications (Ptenets-2) ==
Data from Bayerl

General characteristics

- Crew: one
- Capacity: one passenger
- Wingspan: 10.2 m (33 ft 6 in)
- Wing area: 12.7 m^{2} (137 sq ft)
- Empty weight: 220 kg (485 lb)
- Gross weight: 450 kg (992 lb)
- Fuel capacity: 55 litres (12 imp gal; 15 US gal)
- Powerplant: 1 × Rotax 582 twin cylinder, liquid-cooled, two stroke aircraft engine, 48 kW (64 hp)
- Propellers: 4-bladed composite

Performance

- Maximum speed: 160 km/h (99 mph, 86 kn)
- Cruise speed: 120 km/h (75 mph, 65 kn)
- Stall speed: 65 km/h (40 mph, 35 kn)
- Rate of climb: 4 m/s (790 ft/min)
