= CBB O2 =

French ultralight trike

O2

General information
- Type: Ultralight trike
- National origin: France
- Manufacturer: CBB ULM
- Designer: Bruno Bouron
- Status: In production (2018)

The CBB O2 (often styled O²) is a family of French ultralight trikes, designed by Bruno Bouron and produced by CBB ULM of Montreuil-Bellay. The aircraft is supplied complete and ready to fly.

== Design and development ==
The O2 was designed to comply with the Fédération Aéronautique Internationale microlight category, including the category's maximum gross weight of 450 kg (992 lb). The aircraft has a maximum gross weight of 450 kg (992 lb).

The aircraft design features a cable-braced hang glider-style high wing supported by a curved mount, weight-shift controls, a two-seats-in-tandem open cockpit with a small cockpit fairing, tricycle landing gear with wheel pants and a single engine in pusher configuration.

The aircraft is made from bolted-together aluminum tubing, with its double-surface wing covered in Dacron sailcloth. Its 9.38 m (30.8 ft) span wing is supported by a single tube-type kingpost and uses an "A" frame weight-shift control bar. The powerplant is a twin-cylinder, liquid-cooled, two-stroke, dual-ignition 64 hp (48 kW) Rotax 582 engine or a four-cylinder, air- and liquid-cooled, four-stroke, dual-ignition 80 hp (60 kW) Rotax 912UL engine. At one time the twin-cylinder, air-cooled, four-stroke, dual-ignition 60 hp (45 kW) HKS 700E engine was offered, but its use on the O2 had been discontinued by 2015. By 2018 the HKS powerplant had returned as an option.

In its O2 SW 582 version, the aircraft has an empty weight of 172 kg (379 lb) and a gross weight of 450 kg (992 lb), giving a useful load of 278 kg (613 lb). With full fuel of 52 litres (11 imp gal; 14 US gal), the payload is 241 kg (531 lb).

An improved model of the basic O2 carriage is the O2B.

A number of different wings can be fitted to the basic carriage, including the standard La Mouette Oryx.

== Variants ==
O2 582 Oryx 14
Model powered by a twin cylinder, liquid-cooled, two-stroke, dual-ignition 64 hp (48 kW) Rotax 582 engine and equipped with a La Mouette Oryx wing.
O2 SW 582
Economical model powered by a twin-cylinder, liquid-cooled, two-stroke, dual-ignition 64 hp (48 kW) Rotax 582 engine.
O2 SW 912
Model powered by a four-cylinder, air and liquid-cooled, four-stroke, dual-ignition 80 hp (60 kW) Rotax 912UL engine and equipped with a La Mouette Oryx wing.
O2B HKS Light
Model powered by a twin-cylinder, air-cooled, four-stroke, dual-ignition 60 hp (45 kW) HKS 700E engine and equipped with a La Mouette wing.
O2B HKS SW
Model with options as standard for cross-country flying, powered by a twin-cylinder, air-cooled, four-stroke, dual-ignition 60 hp (45 kW) HKS 700E engine and equipped with a La Mouette wing.
O2B 582
Model powered by a twin-cylinder, liquid-cooled, two-stroke, dual-ignition 64 hp (48 kW) Rotax 582 engine.
O2B 912
Model powered by a four-cylinder, air- and liquid-cooled, four-stroke, dual-ignition 80 hp (60 kW) Rotax 912UL engine.

== Specifications (O2 SW 582) ==
Data from Tacke

General characteristics

- Crew: one
- Capacity: one passenger
- Wingspan: 9.38 m (30 ft 9 in)
- Wing area: 12.9 m^{2} (139 sq ft)
- Empty weight: 172 kg (379 lb)
- Gross weight: 450 kg (992 lb)
- Fuel capacity: 52 litres (11 imp gal; 14 US gal)
- Powerplant: 1 × Rotax 582 twin cylinder, liquid-cooled, two stroke aircraft engine, 48 kW (64 hp)
- Propellers: 4-bladed fixed pitch

Performance

- Maximum speed: 135 km/h (84 mph, 73 kn)
- Cruise speed: 90 km/h (56 mph, 49 kn)
- Rate of climb: 5.4 m/s (1,060 ft/min)
- Wing loading: 34.9 kg/m^{2} (7.1 lb/sq ft)
