= Airsport =

Czech aircraft manufacturer

Airsport s.r.o.
- Company type: Privately held company
- Industry: Aerospace
- Founded: April 27, 2002
- Founder: Jan Pajer
- Headquarters: Zbraslavice, Czech Republic
- Products: Kit aircraft, microlight aircraft, motorgliders
- Website: www.airsport.cz/AIRSPORT/DOMU.html

Airsport s.r.o. is a Czech aircraft manufacturer based in Zbraslavice. The company specializes in the design and manufacture of microlight aircraft and motorgliders in the form of kits for amateur construction and ready-to-fly aircraft for the European Fédération Aéronautique Internationale microlight category.

== Overview ==
The organization is a Czech společnost s ručením omezeným (s.r.o.), or private limited company. The company has three designs in production as of 2015, all constructed from composite materials. The Airsport Sonet is a light touring aircraft derived from the Airsport Sonata motorglider. The Airsport Song is a single-seat motorglider, with an unusual twin-boom and inverted V-tail layout.

== Aircraft ==
Summary of aircraft built by Airsport
Model name	First flight	Number built	Type
Airsport Sonet			Two-seat light touring microlight aircraft
Airsport Sonata			Two-seat motorglider
Airsport Song			Single-seat motorglider
