= HKS 700E =

Japanese aircraft engine

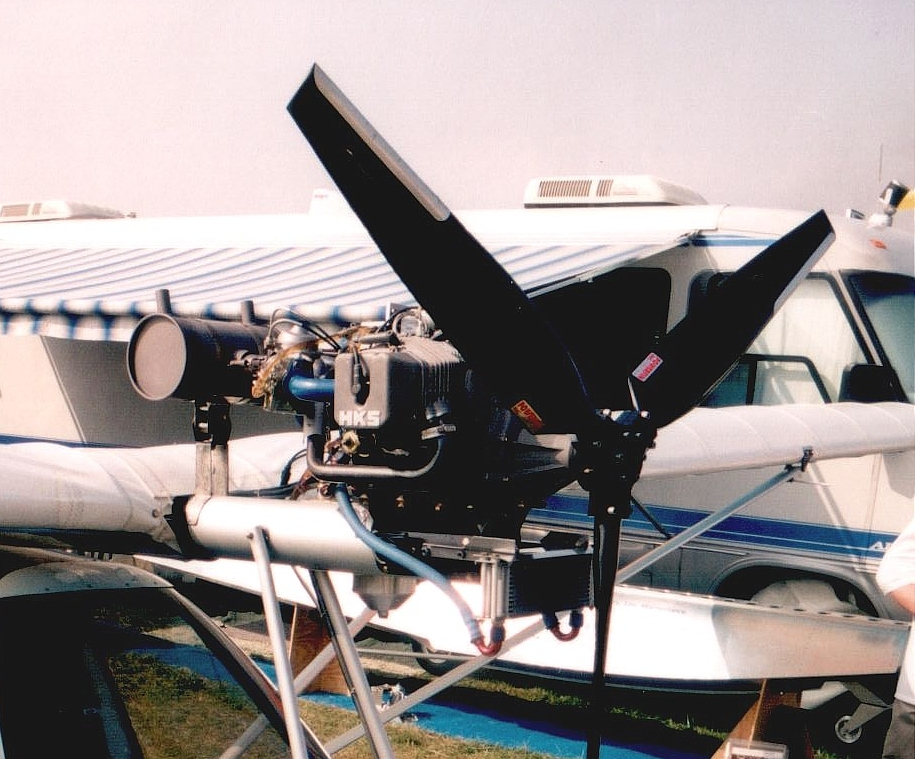
- HKS 700E mounted on a Flightstar II
- Type: Twin cylinder four-stroke aircraft engine
- National origin: Japan
- Manufacturer: HKS

The HKS 700E is a twin-cylinder, horizontally opposed, four stroke, carburetted aircraft engine, designed for use on ultralight aircraft, powered parachutes and ultralight trikes. The engine is manufactured by HKS, a Japanese company noted for its automotive racing engines.

== Development ==
The HKS 700E has dual capacitor discharge ignition, dual carburetors and electric start. The engine is mainly air-cooled, but with oil-cooled cylinder heads. The OHV pushrod engine has four valves per cylinder, and nickel-ceramic coated cylinder bores. Lubrication is dry sump, with a trochoid pump.

The reduction drive is a choice of two integral gearboxes: the A-type gearbox has a 2.58:1 ratio and can accommodate propellers of up to 4,000 kg/cm2 inertial load; the B-type gearbox has a 3.47:1 ratio and can accommodate propellers of up to 6,000 kg/cm2.

The 700E burns 9 L (2.4 US gal) per hour in cruise flight at 4,750 rpm. The recommended time between overhauls is 1000 hours, although this is expected to be increased as experience is gained.

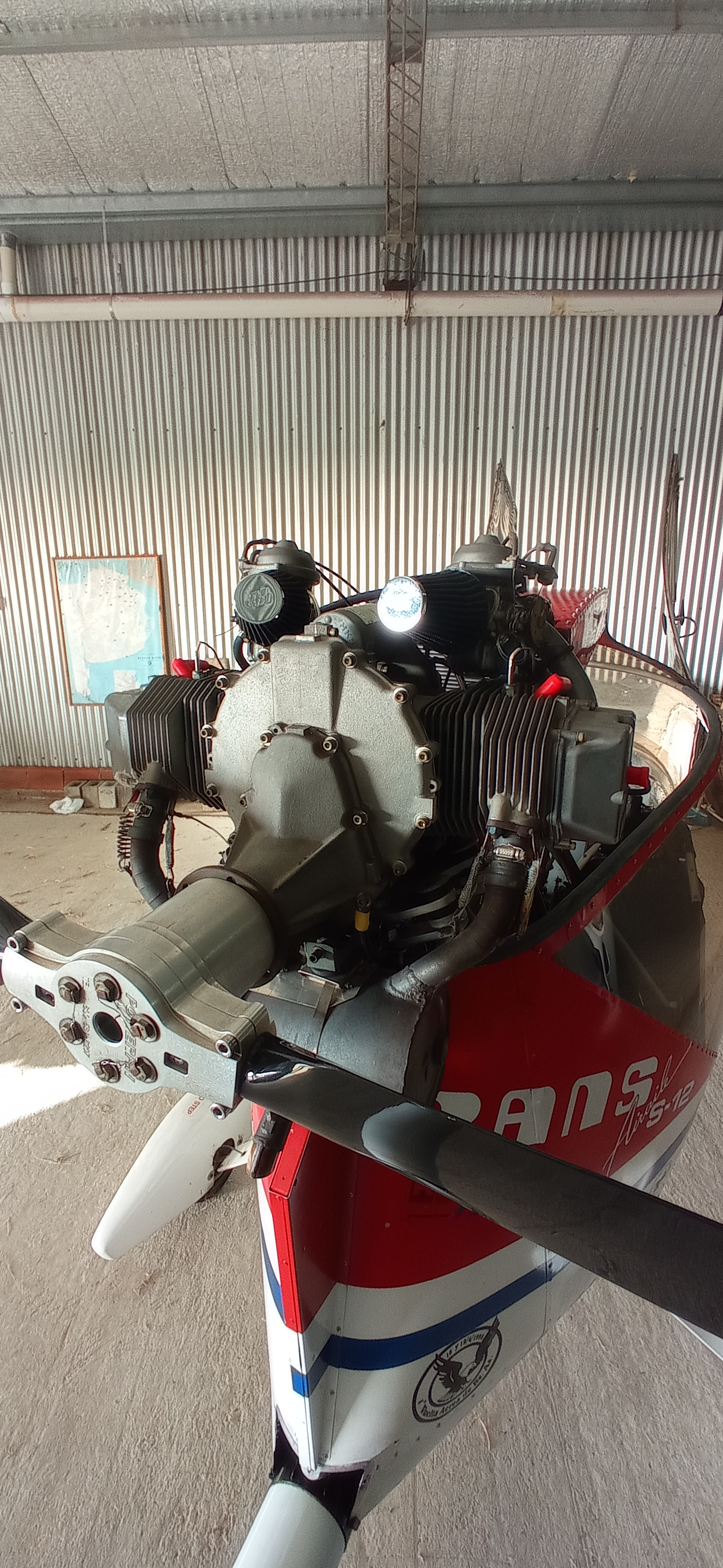
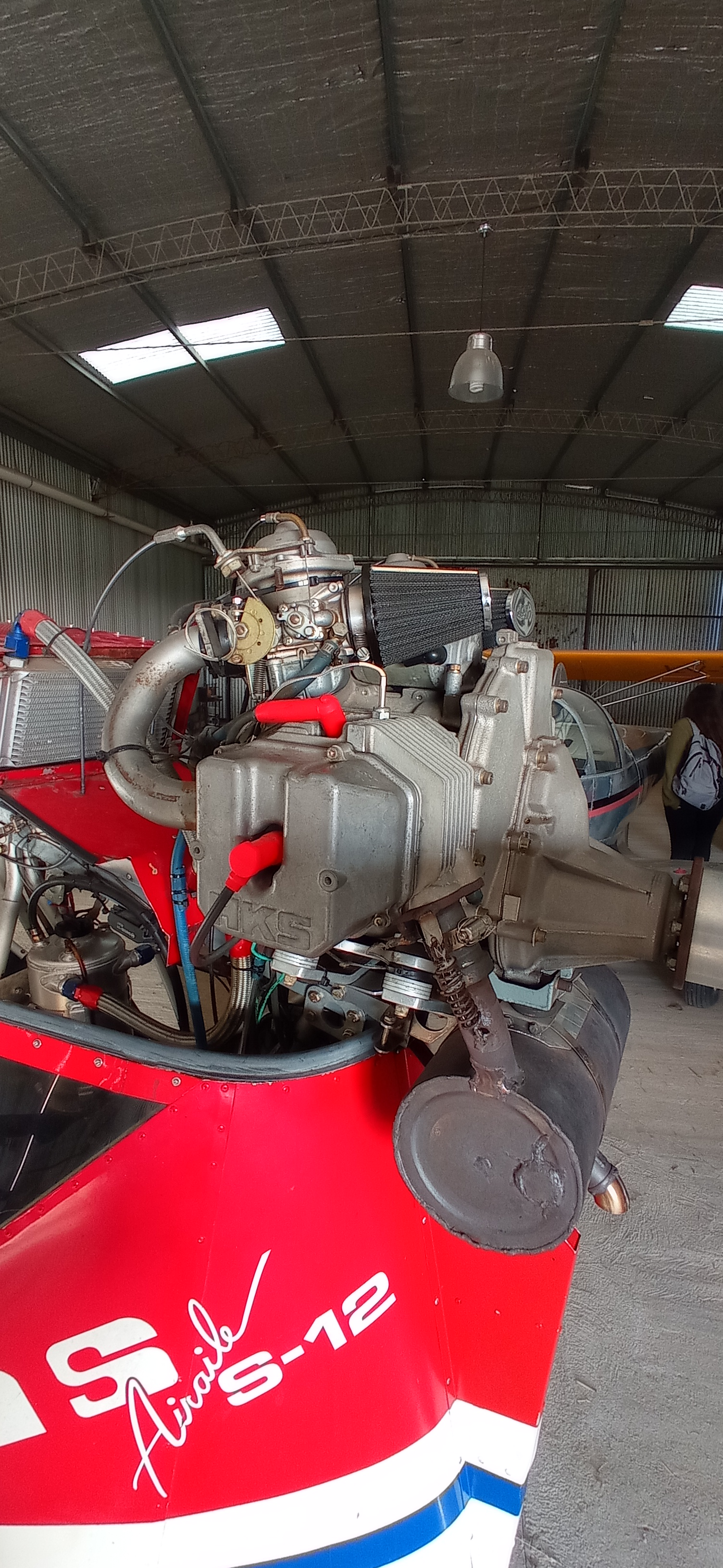
HKS 700E on a Rans S-12 Airaile

Producing 60 hp (45 kW) at 6,200 rpm for three minutes for take-off and 56 hp (42 kW) at 5,800 rpm continuously, the 700E was designed as a fuel efficient four stroke alternative to the high fuel consumption two stroke engines, such as the Rotax 582.

Coupe (facelift)HKS 700E engines from serial number 101105 and above meet ASTM standard 2339-05, which governs the design and manufacture of reciprocating engines for light-sport aircraft. Compliance with the ASTM standard means the aircraft is applicable for use on special or experimental light-sport aircraft (S-LSA or E-LSA).

The company's owner's manual disclaimer states:

WARNING! This is a non-certified aircraft engine, the possibility of engine failure exists at all times. Do not operate this engine over densely populated areas. Do not operate this engine over terrain where a safe, power off landing cannot be performed. The operating and maintenance instructions supplied with this engine must be followed at all times. Flying any aircraft involves the risk of injury or death, building and maintaining your own aircraft requires great personal responsibility.

== Variants ==
700E
Initial version, normally aspirated and producing 60 hp (45 kW) at 6200 rpm for three minutes for take-off and 56 hp (42 kW) at 5800 rpm continuously.
700T
Turbocharged version with a 62.5 mm (2.5 in) stroke and a compression ratio of 8.8:1, that produces 80 hp (60 kW) at 5300 rpm for three minutes for take-off and 77 hp (57 kW) at 4900 rpm continuously. The engine's dry weight is 57.5 kg (127 lb) equipped with electrical system, electric starter, fuel injectors, gearbox, exhaust system and turbocharger. The initial time between overhauls is recommended as 500 hours, but this is expected to rise with operational experience.

== Applications ==
- Aeroalcool Quasar
- Aeros del Sur Manta
- Aéro Services Guépard Guépe
- Air Creation Skypper
- Air Creation Trek
- Airsport Sonet
- Antares MA-33
- Aviation Products Star Trike
- BAaer Guri
- BB Microlight BB-two seater
- Bede BD-6
- Bede BD-17 Nugget
- ASAP Chinook Plus 2
- Capella T-Raptor
- CBB O2
- CGS Hawk
- Club ULM Rotor Ptenets-2
- Cyclone AX2000
- DTA Combo
- Earthstar Thunder Gull
- Excalibur Aircraft Excalibur
- Fletcher Hercules
- Flightstar II
- Flying K Sky Raider
- Flying Machines FM301
- Harmening High Flyer
- Garland Vampire GA-3
- Green Sky Adventures Micro Mong
- Hy-Tek Hurricane Hauler
- Murphy JDM-8
- Murphy Maverick
- North Wing Sport X2
- Phoenix Air Phoenix
- Quad City Challenger
- Quicksilver GT400
- RagWing RW22 Tiger Moth
- Rainbow Aerotrike
- SlipStream Ultra Sport
- Solo Wings Aquilla
- Sport Flight Talon
- Stellar Astra
- Summit Steel Breeze
- Sundog Two-Seater
- TechProAviation Merlin 100
- Titan Tornado

== Specifications (700E) ==
Data from Cliche & HKS

=== General characteristics ===
- Type: Two cylinder, four-stroke aircraft engine
- Bore: 85 mm (3.3 in)
- Stroke: 60 mm (2.4 in)
- Displacement: 680 cc (41.49 cu in)
- Dry weight: 55 kg (121 lb) equipped with electrical system, electric starter, carburetors, gearbox, exhaust system, oil tank and cooler

=== Components ===
- Valvetrain: two intake and two exhaust valves per cylinder
- Fuel type: unleaded auto fuel
- Oil system: dry sump with a trochoid pump
- Cooling system: free air cylinders, with oil-cooled cylinder heads
- Reduction gear: A-type gearbox with 2.58:1 ratio, limit of 4,000kg/cm2 inertial load. The B-type gearbox with 3.47:1 ratio, limit of 6,000kg/cm2 inertial load

=== Performance ===
- Power output: 60 hp (45 kW) at 6200 rpm for three minutes for take-off and 56 hp (42 kW) at 5800 rpm continuous
- Compression ratio: 11.3:1

== See also ==
- Jabiru 2200
- KFM 112M
- Pegasus PAL 95
- Rotax 912
- ULPower UL260i
