= Stellar Astra =

American ultralight trike

Astra

General information
- Type: Ultralight trike
- National origin: United States
- Manufacturer: Stellar Aircraft
- Designer: Allistair Wilson
- Status: Production completed

The Stellar Astra is an American ultralight trike that was designed by Allistair Wilson and produced by Stellar Aircraft of Bloomfield, Indiana. When it was available the aircraft was supplied as a complete ready-to-fly-aircraft. As of 2013 the company appears to be out of business and production complete.

== Design and development ==
The Astra was derived from a P&M Aviation trike design and intended to comply with the US light-sport aircraft category, although it does not appear on the Federal Aviation Administration's accepted LSA list.

The Astra features a cable-braced hang glider-style high-wing, weight-shift controls, a two-seats-in-tandem open cockpit with a cockpit fairing, tricycle landing gear with wheel pants and a single engine in pusher configuration.

The aircraft is made from bolted-together aluminum tubing, with its double surface wing covered in Dacron sailcloth. Its 34.4 ft (10.5 m) span wing is supported by a single tube-type kingpost and uses an "A" frame weight-shift control bar. Powerplants that were factory available were the twin cylinder, air-cooled, two-stroke, dual-ignition 50 hp (37 kW) Rotax 503, the four cylinder, air and liquid-cooled, four-stroke, dual-ignition 80 hp (60 kW) Rotax 912UL and 100 hp (75 kW) Rotax 912ULS and the twin cylinder, air-cooled, four-stroke, dual-ignition 60 hp (45 kW) HKS 700E engine.

With the HKS powerplant the aircraft has an empty weight of 485 lb (220 kg) and a gross weight of 960 lb (435 kg), giving a useful load of 475 lb (215 kg).

The aircraft was produced under contract for Stellar Aircraft in India by Albatross Flying Systems, who also marketed the design in Asia as the Cruiser.

== Specifications (Astra) ==
Data from Bayerl

General characteristics

- Crew: one
- Capacity: one passenger
- Wingspan: 34 ft 5 in (10.5 m)
- Wing area: 168 sq ft (15.6 m^{2})
- Empty weight: 485 lb (220 kg)
- Gross weight: 959 lb (435 kg)
- Powerplant: 1 × HKS 700E twin cylinder, air-cooled, four stroke aircraft engine, 60 hp (45 kW)
- Propellers: 3-bladed composite

Performance

- Maximum speed: 78 mph (125 km/h, 67 kn)
- Cruise speed: 62 mph (100 km/h, 54 kn)
- Stall speed: 37 mph (60 km/h, 32 kn)
- Rate of climb: 450 ft/min (2.3 m/s)
- Wing loading: 5.7 lb/sq ft (27.9 kg/m^{2})
