= Electric Aircraft Corporation Electra 1 =

American electric aircraft motor

Electra 1
- Type: Electric aircraft engine
- National origin: United States
- Manufacturer: Electric Aircraft Corporation
- Major applications: ultralight trikes

The Electric Aircraft Corporation Electra 1 is an American electric motor for powering electric aircraft, designed and produced by Electric Aircraft Corporation of Cliffside Park, New Jersey.

The engine is normally sold in a package that includes "motor, electronic controller, power dial and switch, fuse, connectors, ammeter and shunt, voltmeter, custom machined propeller hub, and digital motor temperature display with probe."

== Design and development ==
The Electra 1 is a brushed 74 volt design producing 14 kW (19 hp). It has an 85% efficiency. The low working rpm of the engine means that it can turn a propeller at efficient speeds without the need for a reduction drive.

== Applications ==
- Electric Aircraft Corporation ElectraFlyer Trike

== Specifications (Electra 1) ==
Data from Tacke

=== General characteristics ===
- Type: brushed electric aircraft engine
- Dry weight: 12 kg (26.5 lb)

=== Components ===
- Reduction gear: none

=== Performance ===
- Power output: 14 kW (19 hp)
- Voltage: 74V nominal
- Best efficiency: 85%
- Power-to-weight ratio: 1.2 kW/kg

== See also ==
Related lists

- List of aircraft engines
