= Aeroalcool Quasar =

Brazilian light-sport aircraft

Quasar
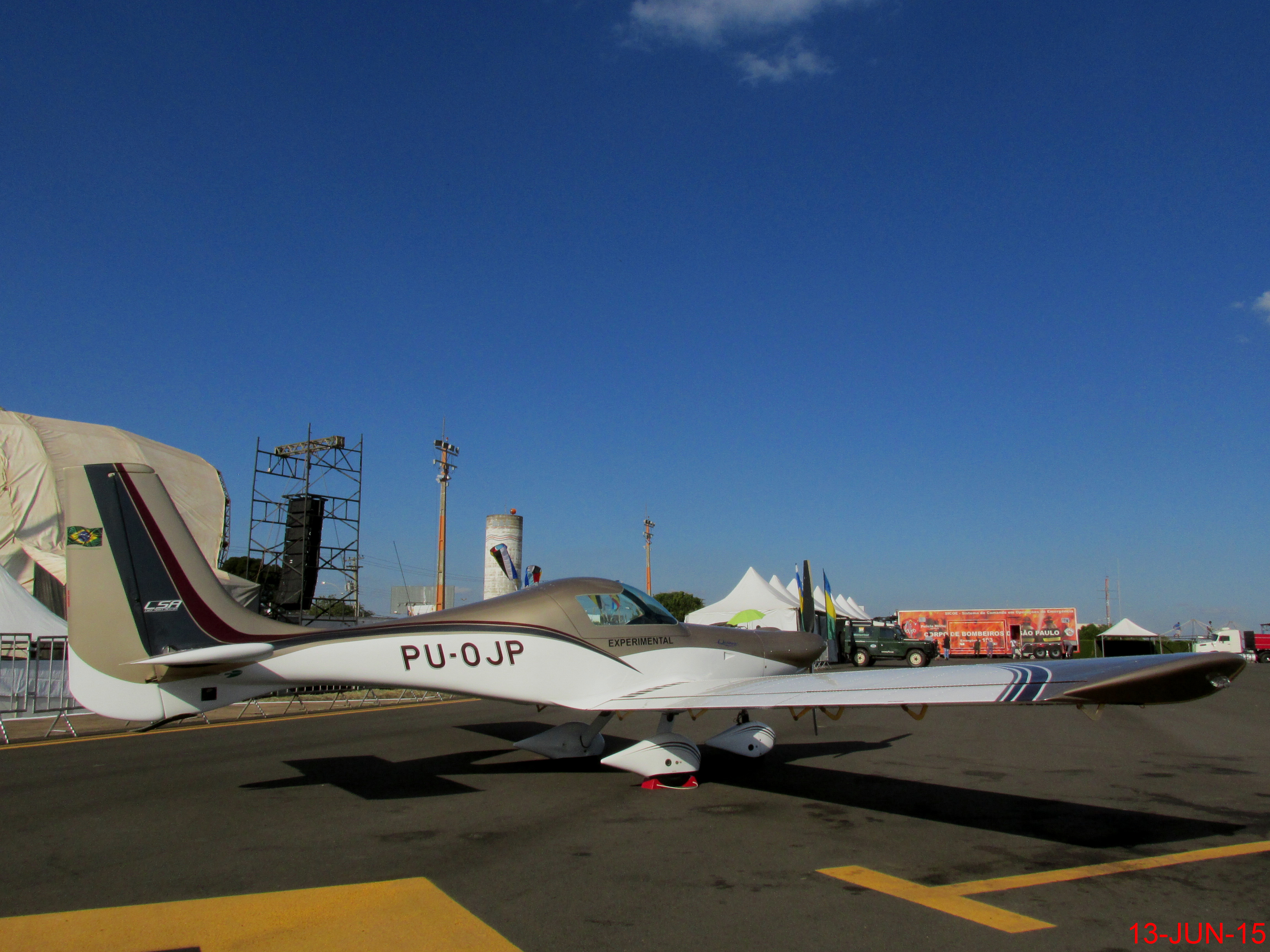

General information
- Type: Light-sport aircraft
- National origin: Brazil
- Manufacturer: Aeroálcool
- Designer: Frank Porter and James Waterhouse
- Status: In production
- Number built: 60 (2015)

History
- Introduction date: 2007

The Aeroalcool Quasar is a Brazilian light-sport aircraft that is produced by Aeroálcool and was introduced in 2007.

== Design and development ==
The aircraft was designed by American Frank Porter with assistance from James Waterhouse of the Federal University of São Carlos in Brazil, to comply with the US light-sport aircraft rules. It features a cantilever low-wing, a two seats in side-by-side configuration enclosed cockpit under a forward hinged canopy, tricycle landing gear and a single engine in tractor configuration.

The aircraft is made from aluminum sheet and has a 9.25 m (30.3 ft) span wing. The initial engine used was the Japanese 60 hp (45 kW) HKS 700E four-stroke powerplant which gives it a cruise speed of 210 km/h (130 mph) while burning only 9 litres (2.0 imp gal; 2.4 US gal) per hour of auto fuel.

A total of 60 had been built by 2015.

== Variants ==
Quasar Lite
Initial model, powered by the 85 hp (63 kW) Jabiru 2200 four-stroke powerplant.
Quasar 214SL
Import version for the US market, distributed by Quasar Aircraft Company, Inc. Accepted as a US light sport aircraft in 2007.
Quasar Fast
Model powered by the 120 hp (89 kW) Jabiru 3300 four-stroke powerplant.

== Specifications (Quasar Lite) ==
Data from Bayerl

General characteristics

- Crew: one
- Capacity: one passenger
- Wingspan: 9.25 m (30 ft 4 in)
- Wing area: 9.2 m^{2} (99 sq ft)
- Empty weight: 215 kg (474 lb)
- Gross weight: 589 kg (1,299 lb)
- Powerplant: 1 × HKS 700E two cylinder, liquid and air-cooled, four stroke, 45 kW (60 hp)
- Propellers: 2-bladed ground adjustable

Performance

- Maximum speed: 260 km/h (160 mph, 140 kn)
- Cruise speed: 191 km/h (119 mph, 103 kn)
- Stall speed: 72 km/h (45 mph, 39 kn)
- Rate of climb: 4.32 m/s (850 ft/min)
