= Ivanov ZJ-Viera =

Czech ultralight aircraft

ZJ-Viera

General information
- Type: Ultralight aircraft
- National origin: Czech Republic
- Manufacturer: Ivanov Aero
- Designer: Marek Ivanov
- Status: Production completed (2016)

History
- Introduction date: c. 2008

The Ivanov ZJ-Viera (Faith) is a Czech ultralight and light-sport aircraft that was designed by Marek Ivanov and produced by Ivanov Aero s.r.o. of Hradec Králové. The aircraft was supplied as a kit for amateur construction or complete and ready-to-fly.

Ivanov Aero seems to have been founded about 2008 and gone out of business in 2016. The design is apparently out of production.

== Design and development ==
The ZJ-Viera was designed to comply with the European single seat deregulated rules and US FAR 103 Ultralight Vehicles rules, with an empty weight of just 77 kg (170 lb). It features a cantilever low-wing, a single-seat open cockpit with a windshield, fixed monowheel landing gear with wingtip wheels, or optionally tricycle landing gear, and a single engine in tractor configuration, mounted on a short nose pylon.

The aircraft is made from composite materials. Its 7.5 m (24.6 ft) span wing has an area of 9.1 m^{2} (98 sq ft) and the design has a swept cruciform tail. The standard engine used is the 26 hp (19 kW) Hirth F-33 two-stroke powerplant, although a 22 hp (16 kW) engine can be used.

Before the company went out of business in late 2013, InterPlane Aircraft acted as distributor for the design, touting it for the US FAR 103 Ultralight category and the light-sport aircraft category.

As of February 2017, the design does not appear on the Federal Aviation Administration's list of approved special light-sport aircraft.

== Operational history ==
Reviewer Marino Boric described the design in a 2015 review as "the dream of ultralighting returns, but with a 21st century feel! Ultralight on the wallet, too, thanks to a combination of simple design and modern all-composite construction...this airplane shows every sign of becoming a landmark design".

== Specifications (ZJ-Viera) ==
Data from Tacke

General characteristics

- Crew: one
- Wingspan: 7.5 m (24 ft 7 in)
- Wing area: 9.1 m^{2} (98 sq ft)
- Empty weight: 77 kg (170 lb)
- Gross weight: 198 kg (437 lb)
- Fuel capacity: 12 litres (2.6 imp gal; 3.2 US gal)
- Powerplant: 1 × Hirth F-33 single cylinder, air-cooled, two stroke aircraft engine, 19 kW (26 hp)
- Propellers: 2-bladed wooden, fixed pitch

Performance

- Maximum speed: 130 km/h (81 mph, 70 kn)
- Cruise speed: 110 km/h (68 mph, 59 kn)
- Stall speed: 44 km/h (27 mph, 24 kn)
- Rate of climb: 3.5 m/s (690 ft/min)
- Wing loading: 21.8 kg/m^{2} (4.5 lb/sq ft)
