= BAaer BA-5 Gurí =

Argentine ultralight aircraft

BAaer Gurí

General information
- Type: Ultralight aircraft
- National origin: Argentina
- Manufacturer: BAaer
- Status: Production completed

The BAaer Gurí is an Argentine ultralight aircraft, designed and produced by BAaer (BA-Aeroplanos) of Buenos Aires. When it was available the aircraft was supplied as a kit for amateur construction.

== Design and development ==
The Gurí was designed as a simple, low cost aircraft to comply with the Fédération Aéronautique Internationale microlight rules. It features a strut-braced high-wing, a two-seats-in-side-by-side configuration semi-enclosed cockpit, fixed conventional landing gear and a single engine in tractor configuration.

The aircraft is made from a mix of aluminum tubing and fiberglass, with its flying surfaces covered in Dacron sailcloth. Its 10 m (32.8 ft) span wing employs V-struts and jury struts. Standard engines used are the 50 hp (37 kW) Rotax 503, the 64 hp (48 kW) Rotax 582 two-stroke engine, the 80 hp (60 kW) Rotax 912UL and the 60 hp (45 kW) HKS 700E four-stroke powerplant.

== Specifications (Gurí) ==
Data from Bayerl and BAaer

General characteristics

- Crew: one
- Capacity: one passenger
- Length: 6 m (19 ft 8 in)
- Wingspan: 10 m (32 ft 10 in)
- Wing area: 14 m^{2} (150 sq ft)
- Empty weight: 225 kg (496 lb)
- Gross weight: 450 kg (992 lb)
- Fuel capacity: 70 litres (15 imp gal; 18 US gal)
- Powerplant: 1 × Rotax 582 twin cylinder, liquid air-cooled, two stroke aircraft engine, 48 kW (64 hp)
- Propellers: 2-bladed wooden

Performance

- Maximum speed: 150 km/h (93 mph, 81 kn)
- Cruise speed: 130 km/h (81 mph, 70 kn)
- Stall speed: 55 km/h (34 mph, 30 kn)
- Range: 500 km (310 mi, 270 nmi)
- Rate of climb: 4 m/s (790 ft/min)
- Wing loading: 32.1 kg/m^{2} (6.6 lb/sq ft)
