= Bailey Aviation =

British aircraft manufacturer

- Company type: Privately held company
- Industry: Aerospace
- Founder: Paul Bailey
- Headquarters: Over, Cambridgeshire, United Kingdom
- Products: Paramotors, aircraft engines
- Website: www.baileyaviation.com

Bailey Aviation is a British aircraft manufacturer originally based in Bassingbourn, Royston and later in Over, Cambridgeshire. The company was founded by Paul Bailey and specializes in the design and manufacture of paramotors in the form of ready-to-fly aircraft for the US FAR 103 Ultralight Vehicles rules and the European rules. The company also builds aircraft engines.

== History ==
Paul Bailey started in the car racing business, founding Bailey Motorsport to produce automotive racing components. He earned his private pilot licence and became involved in sky diving and finally paramotoring. He found the paramotoring products available at the time were of sub-standard quality and set out to design and build improved paramotors.

The company has produced a line of innovative paramotors, noted for their modular construction. These include the mid-2000s Bailey JPX D330 and Bailey Solo. The company embarked on the creation of a line of small four-stroke paramotor engines as well, creating the Bailey B200 and the derivative Bailey V5 engine, which powers the Bailey V5 paramotor. The Bailey Hornet two-cylinder two-stroke powered paraglider motor was introduced in 2013.

== Aircraft ==
Summary of aircraft built by Bailey Aviation
Model name	First flight	Number built	Type
Bailey JPX D330	mid-2000s		Paramotor
Bailey Solo	mid-2000s		Paramotor
Bailey V5 paramotor	mid-2010s		Paramotor
