= Bailey Hornet =

British aircraft motor

Hornet
- Type: Aircraft engine
- National origin: United Kingdom
- Manufacturer: Bailey Aviation

The Bailey Hornet is a British aircraft engine, under development by Bailey Aviation of Royston, Hertfordshire for use in powered paragliders.

The engine was publicly introduced in 2013, but as of 2018 does not appear for sale.

== Design and development ==
The engine is a twin-cylinder two-stroke, horizontally-opposed, air-cooled, petrol engine design, with a helical gear mechanical gearbox reduction drive and a centrifugal clutch. It produces 28 to 30 hp (21 to 22 kW) and weighs 15.5 kg (34.2 lb).

== Specifications (Hornet) ==
Data from Tacke

=== General characteristics ===
- Type: Twin cylinder, two stroke aircraft engine
- Dry weight: 15.5 kg (34.2 lb)

=== Components ===
- Fuel type: petrol
- Cooling system: air
- Reduction gear: helical gear mechanical gearbox, with centrifugal clutch

=== Performance ===
- Power output: 28 to 30 hp (21 to 22 kW)

== See also ==
Related lists

- List of aircraft engines
