= Airsport Sonata =

General information
- Type: Ultralight aircraft
- National origin: Czech Republic
- Manufacturer: Airsport
- Status: In production

The Airsport Sonata is a Czech ultralight motor glider with retractable propeller, designed and produced by Airsport of Zbraslavice.

== Design and development ==
The aircraft features a cantilever low-wing, a T-tail, a two-seats-in-side-by-side configuration enclosed cockpit, electric flaps, a retractable landing gear, and a single engine in tractor configuration.

The Sonata is made from composites. Its polyhedral wing is 15 m (49.2 ft). Standard engines available are the 65 hp (48 kW) Rotax 582 two-stroke and the 60 hp (45 kW) Hirth F34 powerplant.

== Specifications ==
Data from Pilotmix

General characteristics

- Crew: one
- Capacity: one passenger
- Empty weight: 278 kg (613 lb)
- Gross weight: 450 kg (992 lb)
- Powerplant: 1 × Rotax 582 twin cylinder, liquid air-cooled, two stroke, 37 kW (50 hp)

Performance

- Cruise speed: 90 km/h (56 mph, 49 kn)
- Stall speed: 55 km/h (34 mph, 30 kn)
- Never exceed speed: 330 km/h (210 mph, 180 kn)
- Rate of climb: 2 m/s (390 ft/min)
