= Aviation Products Star Trike =

German ultralight trike

Star Trike

General information
- Type: Ultralight trike
- National origin: Germany
- Manufacturer: Aviation Products Ltd
- Designer: Klaus Wisch
- Status: In production (2013)

History
- Manufactured: 1980–present
- Introduction date: 1980

The Aviation Products Star Trike is a German ultralight trike that was designed by Klaus Wisch and is produced by Aviation Products Ltd of Bitburg.

== Design and development ==
The Star Trike was designed in 1980 has been in production ever since. It fits the Fédération Aéronautique Internationale microlight category. The design features a cable-braced hang glider-style high-wing, weight-shift controls, a single-seat or a two-seats-in-tandem open cockpit, tricycle landing gear with wheel pants and a single engine in pusher configuration.

The aircraft is made from bolted-together aluminum tubing, with its single or double surface wing covered in Dacron sailcloth. Its 10 m (32.8 ft) span wing is supported by a single tube-type kingpost and uses an "A" frame weight-shift control bar. A range of powerplants can be fitted, including the twin cylinder, liquid-cooled, two-stroke, dual-ignition 64 hp (48 kW) Rotax 582 engine and the twin cylinder, air-cooled, four-stroke, dual-ignition 60 hp (45 kW) HKS 700E engine.

In its single seat agricultural version the aircraft has an empty weight of 170 kg (375 lb) and a gross weight of 472.5 kg (1,042 lb), giving a useful load of 302.5 kg (667 lb). With full fuel of 44 litres (9.7 imp gal; 12 US gal) the payload is 271 kg (597 lb).

A number of different wings can be fitted to the basic carriage, including the Air Creation XP 15.

== Variants ==
Star Trike Agrar
Single seat agricultural aircraft version.
Star Trike DS
Dual seat version.

== Specifications (Star Trike Agrar) ==
Data from Bayerl

General characteristics

- Crew: one
- Wingspan: 10 m (32 ft 10 in)
- Wing area: 15.5 m^{2} (167 sq ft)
- Empty weight: 170 kg (375 lb)
- Gross weight: 472.5 kg (1,042 lb)
- Fuel capacity: 44 litres (9.7 imp gal; 12 US gal)
- Powerplant: 1 × Rotax 582 twin cylinder, liquid-cooled, two stroke aircraft engine, 48 kW (64 hp)

Performance

- Maximum speed: 140 km/h (87 mph, 76 kn)
- Cruise speed: 120 km/h (75 mph, 65 kn)
- Stall speed: 47 km/h (29 mph, 25 kn)
- Rate of climb: 6.5 m/s (1,280 ft/min)
- Wing loading: 30.5 kg/m^{2} (6.2 lb/sq ft)
