= Bailey B200 =

British homebuilt aircraft engine

B200
- Type: Aircraft engine
- National origin: United Kingdom
- Manufacturer: Bailey Aviation
- Major applications: Airborne T-Lite

The Bailey B200 is a British single cylinder, four valve, four stroke aircraft engine, designed and produced by Bailey Aviation of Bassingbourn, Royston, specifically for paramotors, powered hang gliders, microlights and ultralight aircraft.

== Design and development ==
The B200 was designed specifically as a more fuel efficient and quieter replacement for small two-stroke engines that are typically used on this class of aircraft. The B200 has a displacement of 200 cc (12.2 cu in), includes standard electric starting and capacitor discharge ignition. It produces 22 hp (16 kW) and drives a propeller through a 3.2:1 belt style reduction drive.

== Applications ==
- Airborne T-Lite

== Specifications (B200) ==
Data from Airborne Windsports

=== General characteristics ===
- Type: Single cylinder, four-stroke aircraft engine
- Displacement: 200 cc (12.2 cu in)
- Starting: standard electric

=== Components ===
- Cooling system: air
- Reduction gear: gearbox-type, 3.2:1

=== Performance ===
- Power output: 22 hp (16 kW)
