= Electric Aircraft Corporation ElectraFlyer-X =

American electric aircraft

ElectraFlyer-X
- The prototype ElectraFlyer-X

General information
- Type: Homebuilt and light-sport electric aircraft
- National origin: United States
- Manufacturer: Electric Aircraft Corporation
- Designer: Randall Fishman
- Status: Under development
- Number built: one

History
- Introduction date: 2009
- Developed from: Electric Aircraft Corporation ElectraFlyer-C

The Electric Aircraft Corporation ElectraFlyer-X is an American kit and light-sport electric aircraft, designed by Randall Fishman and at one time under development by his company Electric Aircraft Corporation of Cliffside Park, New Jersey. The ElectraFlyer-X was introduced at AirVenture in 2009. The aircraft is intended to be supplied as a kit for amateur construction or as a complete ready-to-fly aircraft.

By February 2017 the design was no longer featured on the company website.

== Design and development ==
The ElectraFlyer-X was designed to comply with the US light-sport aircraft (LSA) rules. The current LSA rules do not allow any powerplants except reciprocating engines for Special-LSAs (S-LSAs), but Fishman hopes that the rules will be amended in time. In the meantime the aircraft can be constructed in the Experimental - Amateur Built or Experimental-LSA (E-LSA) categories.

The aircraft features a cantilever low wing, a two-seats-in-side-by-side configuration enclosed cockpit under a bubble canopy, fixed tricycle landing gear and a single electric engine in tractor configuration.

The ElectraFlyer-X is made from composites. Its long 15 m (49.2 ft) span wing features a high aspect ratio for aerodynamic efficiency. The engine is an Electric Aircraft Corporation 50 hp (37 kW) brushless, liquid-cooled powerplant designed specifically for the aircraft. The engine is driven by air-cooled battery packs that are fitted in stainless steel boxes and can be installed in either the engine compartment or the cabin. The batteries will permit flights of up to three hours duration.

In 2015 the projected price for a kit, less batteries, was to be US$65,000. The batteries were estimated to add US$15,000 to the cost.

In April 2010 the aircraft's first flight was predicted for May or June 2010. Series production was originally intended for 2010 and then delayed to 2011. By June 2012 there was no indication that the design had actually flown or that it would be produced in the near future. In June 2012 the company website listed it only as "coming soon", however the aircraft's description page had been removed. The US Federal Aviation Administration indicates that the prototype aircraft, N600EL, was registered on 15 July 2009 and had its registration cancelled on 31 May 2012.

Fishman has indicated that the late 2000s recession caused development of company products to be delayed. In 2011 Fishman said, "The recession has made this not a great business right now".

== Specifications (ElectraFlyer-X) ==
Data from Bayerl

General characteristics

- Crew: one
- Capacity: one passenger
- Wingspan: 49 ft 3 in (15 m)
- Empty weight: 772 lb (350 kg)
- Powerplant: 1 × Electric Aircraft Corporation brushless, liquid-cooled electric aircraft engine, 50 hp (37 kW)
- Propellers: 2-bladed composite

Performance

- Cruise speed: 81 mph (130 km/h, 70 kn)
- Stall speed: 34 mph (55 km/h, 30 kn)
- Endurance: 3 hours
