= Aeroálcool =

Brazilian aircraft manufacturer

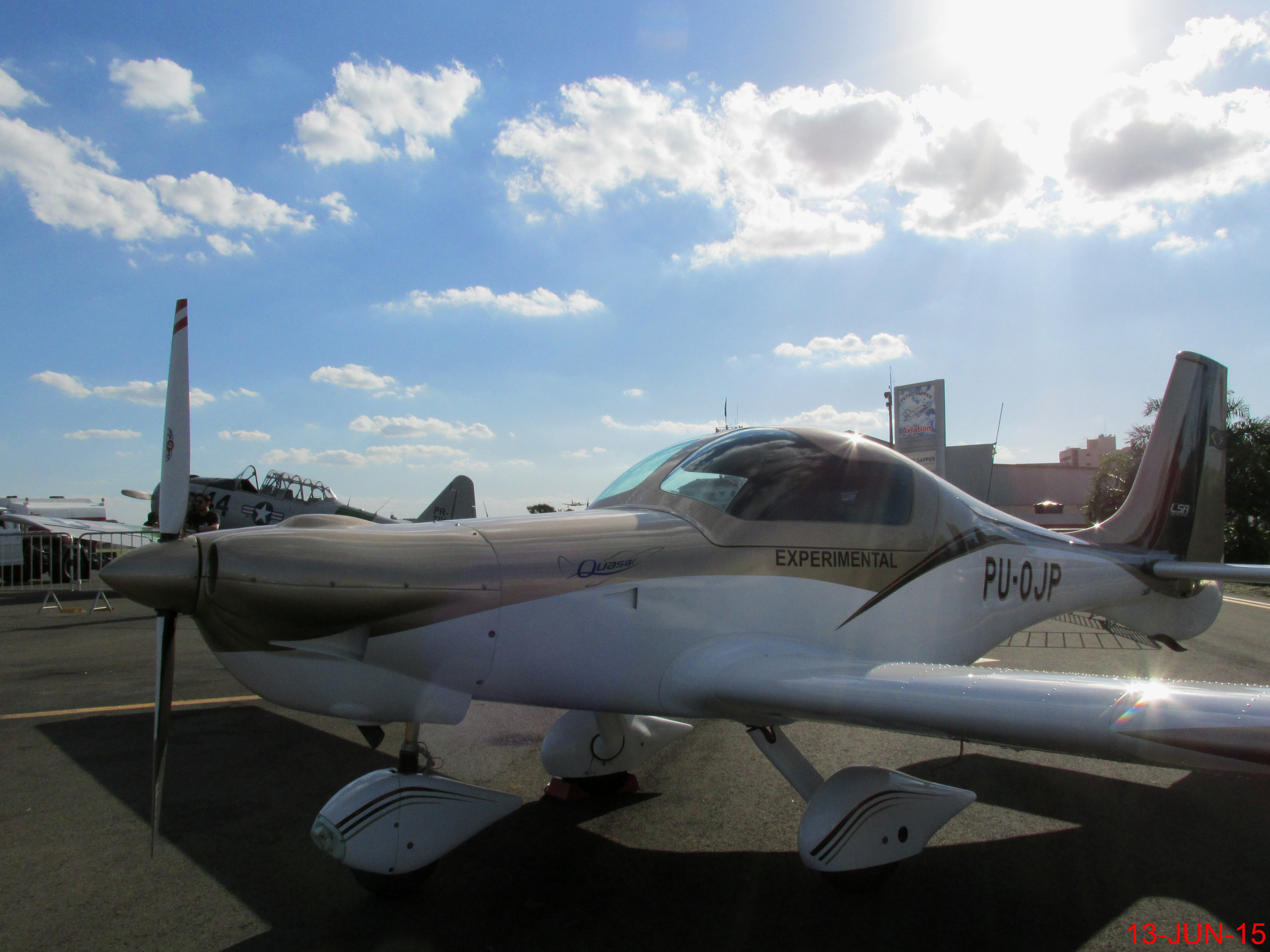
- A Quasar Lite II at Bauru-Arealva Airport
- Type: Sociedade Anônima
- Industry: Aerospace
- Founded: 2001; 25 years ago
- Headquarters: Franca, São Paulo, Brazil
- Products: Airplanes

Aeroálcool is a Brazilian aerospace company based at Franca, São Paulo.

== History ==
The company was founded in 2001 by Omar Pugliesi and the US-American James Waterhouse, originally to produce the ultralight aircraft Aeroalcool Quasar. In the meantime, the company also develops technologies to run engines with ethanol.

Aeroálcool operates in the aerospace industry, with the development and production, as well as the licensed construction of aircraft and components. In addition, unmanned aerial vehicles for civil and military purposes are designed and built.

== Aircraft ==
Summary of aircraft built by Aeroálcool Aircraft
Model name	First flight	Number built	Type
Aeroalcool Quasar	2007	60	Two seat light-sport aircraft

== See also ==
- Aero Bravo
- List of aircraft manufacturers
