= Monnett Moni =

Sport aircraft developed in the early 1980s

Moni
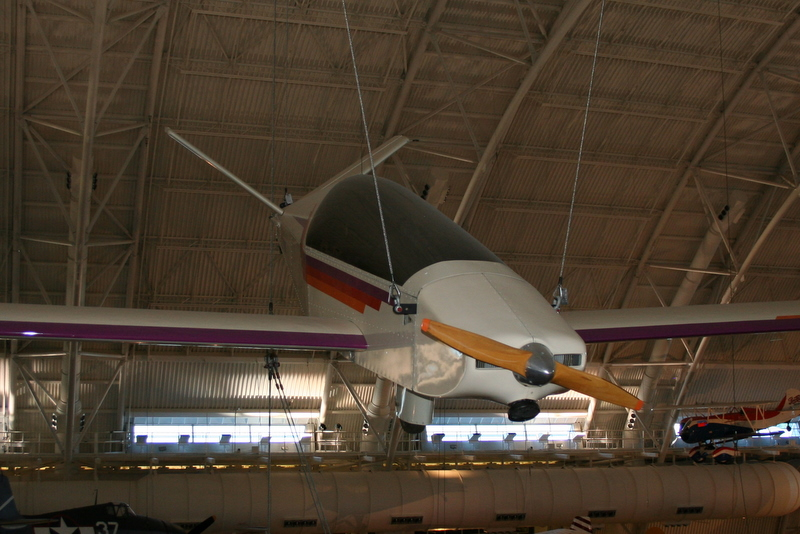
- Monnett Moni on display in the National Air and Space Museum

General information
- Type: Sport aircraft
- National origin: United States
- Manufacturer: Monnett Experimental Aircraft Inc for homebuilding
- Designer: John Monnett
- Number built: 380 kits sold between 1982 and 1986

History
- First flight: July 24, 1981
- Variant: Electric Aircraft Corporation ElectraFlyer-C

The Monnett Moni is a sport aircraft developed in the United States in the early 1980s and marketed for homebuilding.

Designed by John Monnett, who coined the term "air recreation vehicle" to describe it, it is a single-seat motorglider with a low, cantilever wing and a V-tail. Construction is of metal throughout, and it is intended to be easy and inexpensive to build and fly. Like many sailplanes, the main undercarriage is a single monowheel, which in this case was mounted in a streamlined fairing beneath the fuselage and is not retractable, with a steerable tailwheel behind it. Builders are also given the option of constructing their example with fixed tricycle undercarriage. Power is provided by a small two-cylinder, horizontally opposed, air-cooled engine.

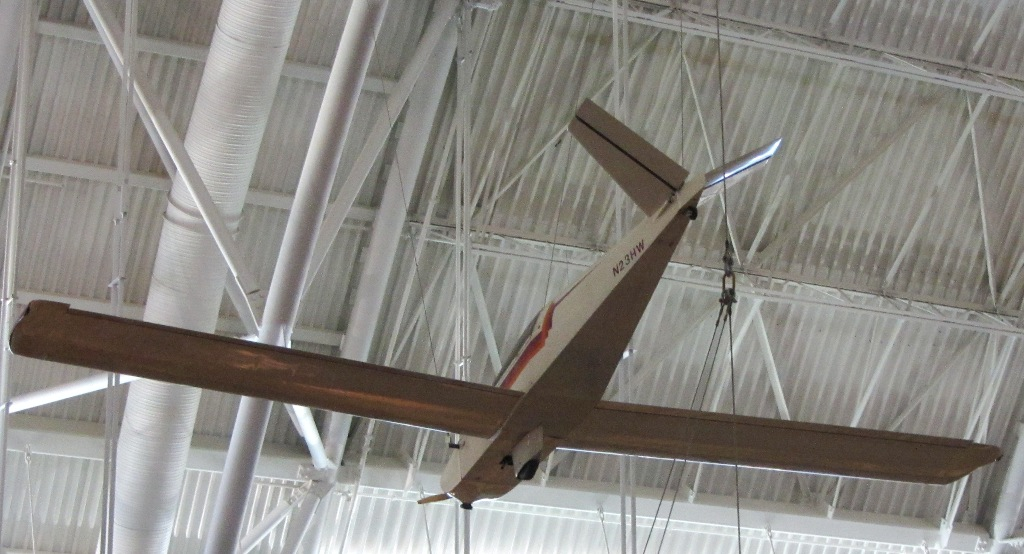
Monnett Moni at the Steven F. Udvar-Hazy Center of the National Air and Space Museum

Examples of the Moni are on display at the Steven F. Udvar-Hazy Center of the National Air and Space Museum, and the EAA AirVenture Museum.

== Variants ==
The Sonex Xenos motorglider is an evolution of the Moni, and provided much of the design foundation for the Sonex line of aircraft.

The all-electric-powered Electric Aircraft Corporation ElectraFlyer-C is a modified Monnett Moni in taildragger configuration.

== Specifications (with tricycle gear) ==
Data from

General characteristics

- Crew: One pilot
- Length: 14 ft 8 in (4.46 m)
- Wingspan: 27 ft 6 in (8.38 m)
- Height: 3 ft 6 in (1.07 m)
- Wing area: 75 sq ft (7.0 m^{2})
- Empty weight: 260 lb (118 kg)
- Gross weight: 500 lb (227 kg)
- Powerplant: 1 × IAME KFM 107 , 30 hp (22 kW)

Performance

- Maximum speed: 120 mph (193 km/h, 100 kn)
- Cruise speed: 110 mph (177 km/h, 96 kn)
- Range: 320 mi (515 km, 280 nmi)
- Service ceiling: 12,500 ft (3,810 m)
- Maximum glide ratio: 20
- Rate of climb: 500 ft/min (2.5 m/s)
- Rate of sink: 167 ft/min (0.85 m/s)
