= Bailey V5 engine =

British aircraft engine

V5
- Type: Aircraft engine
- National origin: United Kingdom
- Manufacturer: Bailey Aviation
- Major applications: Airsport Song; Bailey V5 paramotor

The Bailey V5 is a British aircraft engine, designed and produced by Bailey Aviation of Royston, Hertfordshire for use in powered paragliders, in particular the Bailey V5 paramotor.

== Design and development ==
The engine is a single-cylinder four-stroke, 195 cc (11.9 cu in) displacement, air and oil-cooled, petrol engine design, with a poly V belt reduction drive with reduction ratio of 3.2:1. It employs capacitor discharge ignition and produces 20.5 hp (15 kW) at 8200 rpm.

== Variants ==
V5
Base model with manual recoil start, that weighs 15.8 kg (34.8 lb).
V5E
Model with electric start, that weighs 17.0 kg (37.5 lb).

== Applications ==
- Airsport Song
- Bailey V5 paramotor

== Specifications (V5) ==
Data from Tacke and manufacturer

=== General characteristics ===
- Type: Single cylinder, four stroke aircraft engine
- Bore: 65 mm (2.6 in)
- Stroke: 59 mm (2.3 in)
- Displacement: 195 cc (11.9 cu in)
- Dry weight: 15.8 kg (34.8 lb)

=== Components ===
- Fuel type: 95–99 (Ron) Octane unleaded petrol, Avgas is not recommended
- Cooling system: air and oil
- Reduction gear: poly V belt

=== Performance ===
- Power output: 20.5 hp (15 kW)

== See also ==
Related lists

- List of aircraft engines
