= Aéro Services Guépard Guêpe =

French ultralight aeroplane

Guêpe

General information
- Type: Ultralight aircraft
- National origin: France
- Manufacturer: Aéro Services Guépard
- Status: In production

The Aéro Services Guépard Guêpe (sometimes just called La Guêpe; English: Wasp) is a French ultralight aircraft, designed and produced by Aéro Services Guépard. The aircraft is supplied fully assembled.

== Design and development ==
The aircraft was designed to comply with the Fédération Aéronautique Internationale microlight rules. It features a V-strut-braced high-wing, a two seats in tandem open cockpit, conventional landing gear and a single engine in pusher configuration.

The aircraft is made from bolted-together aluminum tubing, with a single tube serving as the keel tube. A small cockpit fairing and windshield are optional. Its 8.6 m (28.2 ft) span wing has an aluminium structure with its flying surfaces covered in doped aircraft fabric. Standard engines available are the 64 hp (48 kW) Rotax 582 two-stroke and the 60 hp (45 kW) HKS 700E four-stroke powerplant.

== Specifications (Guêpe) ==
Data from Bayerl

General characteristics

- Crew: one
- Capacity: one passenger
- Wingspan: 8.6 m (28 ft 3 in)
- Wing area: 12 m^{2} (130 sq ft)
- Empty weight: 190 kg (419 lb)
- Fuel capacity: 60 litres (13 imp gal; 16 US gal)
- Powerplant: 1 × Rotax 582 four cylinder, liquid-cooled, two stroke, 48 kW (64 hp)
- Propellers: 2-bladed ground adjustable

Performance

- Maximum speed: 160 km/h (99 mph, 86 kn)
- Cruise speed: 130 km/h (81 mph, 70 kn)
- Stall speed: 45 km/h (28 mph, 24 kn)
- Rate of climb: 2.5 m/s (490 ft/min)
