= Electric Aircraft Corporation ElectraFlyer Trike =

American electric ultralight trike

ElectraFlyer

General information
- Type: Ultralight aircraft
- Manufacturer: Electric Aircraft Corporation
- Designer: Randall Fishman

History
- Manufactured: 2007–Present
- First flight: April, 2007

The Electric Aircraft Corporation ElectraFlyer Trike is an ultralight trike fitted with an electric motor, instead of a traditional gasoline engine.

== Design and development ==
The Electraflyer Trike is built to comply with Federal Aviation Regulations, part 103. The standard ElectraFlyer is equipped with a 5.6—kWh Lithium-ion polymer battery which powers an 19 hp (14 kW) Electric Aircraft Corporation Electra 1 electric motor — which can be optionally upgraded to a 40 hp (30 kW) motor. Depending on the number of battery packs mounted, the aircraft can fly for between one and two hours before it must be recharged for 5–6 hours using a standard 120 volt AC outlet. Charging time can be reduced to 2 hours using a 240 volt outlet.

Mounting a Stratus-model hang glider style wing, the total aircraft weight is less than 249 lb (113 kg), depending on the options selected for engine, batteries, and other accessories such as a ballistic parachute.

It was awarded the Grand Champion Ultralight at the 2007 EAA AirVenture Oshkosh Fly-In.
