= Rasošky =

- Municipality
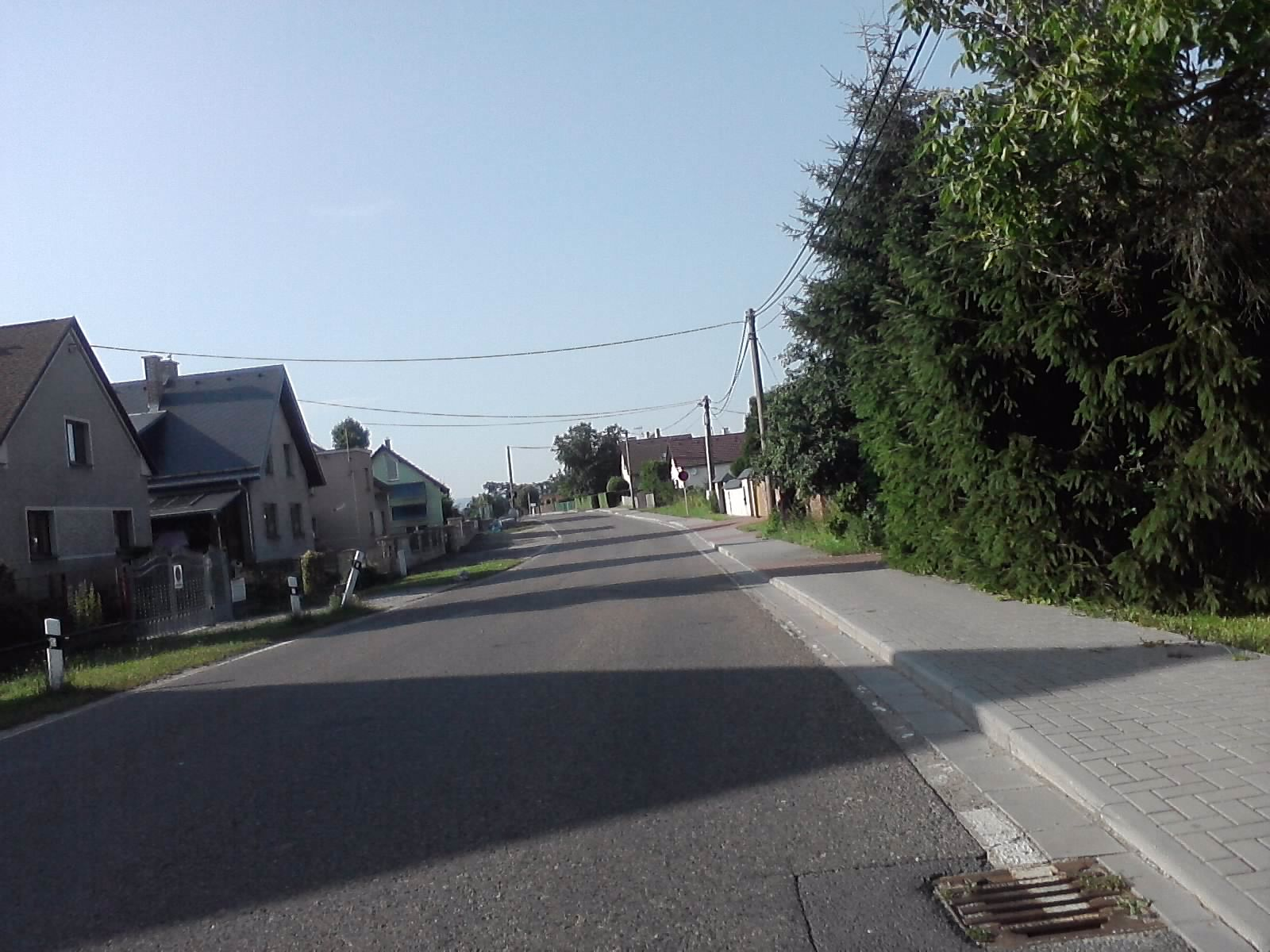
- Main road

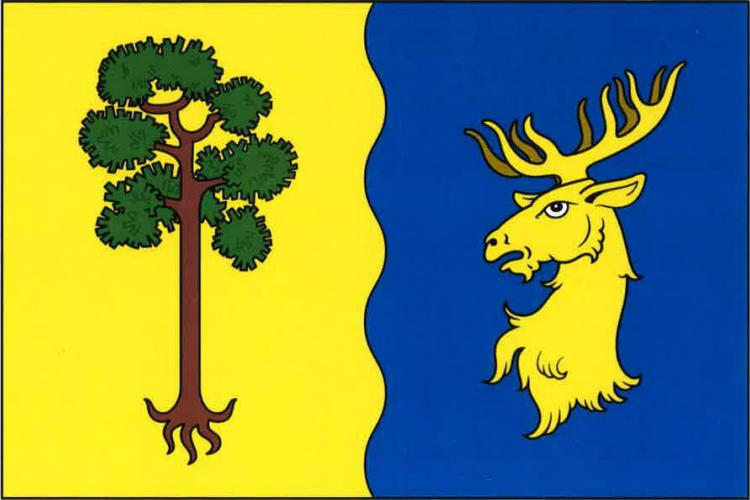
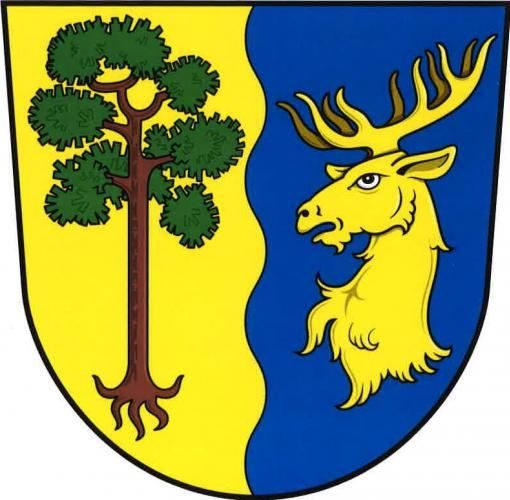
- Flag Coat of arms

- Location in the Czech Republic
- Coordinates: 50°19′19″N 15°54′42″E
- Country: Czech Republic
- Region: Hradec Králové
- District: Náchod
- Founded: 1836

Area
  - Total: 5.51 km^{2} (2.13 sq mi)
- Elevation: 262 m (860 ft)

Population (2026-01-01)
  - Total: 681
  - Density: 124/km^{2} (320/sq mi)
- Time zone: UTC+1 (CET)
  - Summer (DST): UTC+2 (CEST)
- Postal code: 552 21
- Website: www.rasosky.cz

Rasošky is a municipality and village in Náchod District in the Hradec Králové Region of the Czech Republic. It has about 700 inhabitants.

== Administrative division ==
Rasošky consists of two municipal parts (in brackets population according to the 2021 census):

- Rasošky (600)
- Dolní Ples t. Vodní Ples (72)

== Demographics ==
Historical population
Year	Pop.	±%
1869	792	—
1880	860	+8.6%
1890	899	+4.5%
1900	945	+5.1%
1910	984	+4.1%
1921	836	−15.0%
1930	856	+2.4%
1950	610	−28.7%
1961	628	+3.0%
1970	635	+1.1%
1980	617	−2.8%
1991	521	−15.6%
2001	551	+5.8%
2011	643	+16.7%
2021	672	+4.5%
Source: Censuses
