= Zbraslavice =

- Municipality
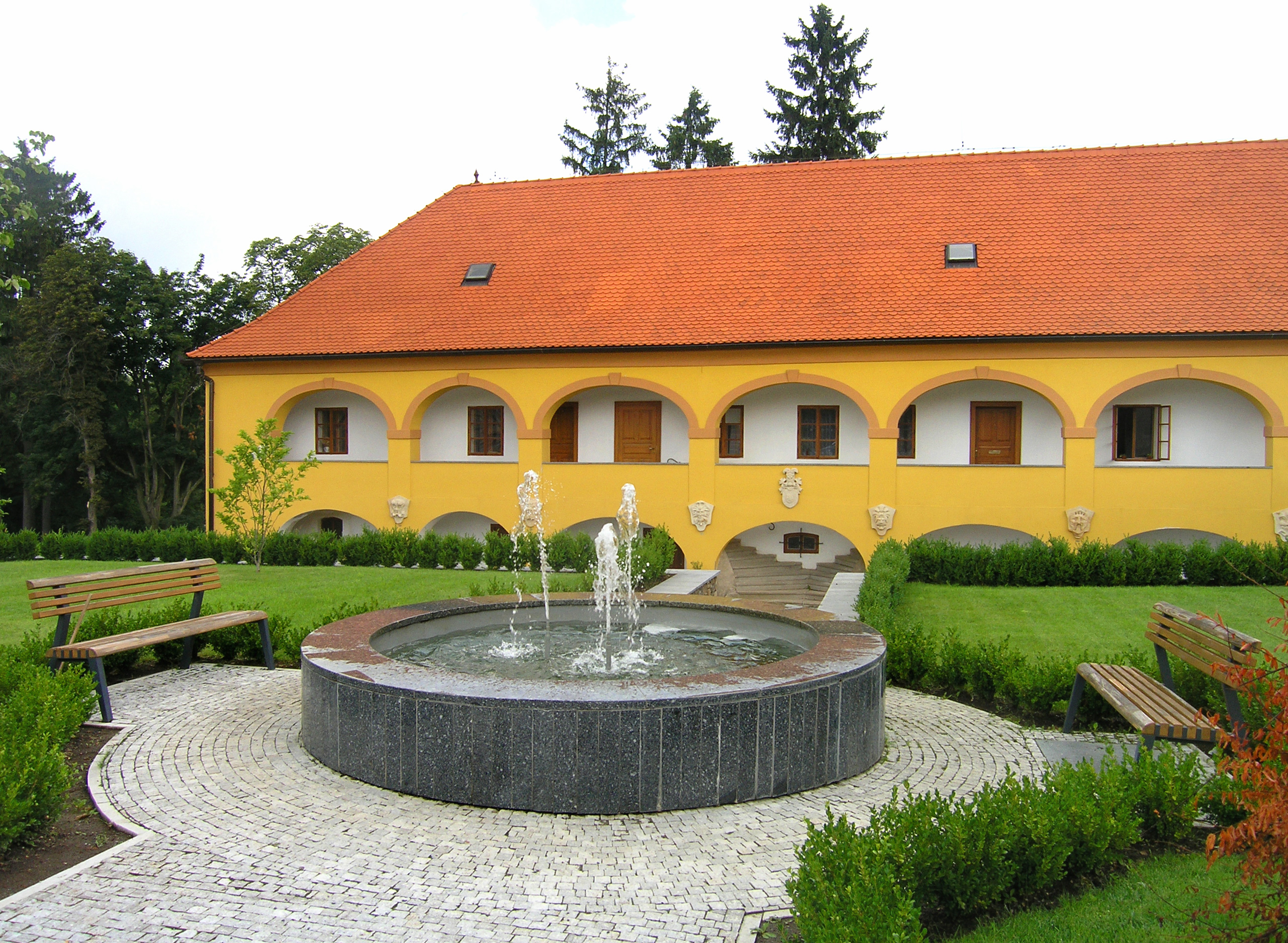
- Zbraslavice Castle

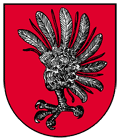
- Coat of arms

- Location in the Czech Republic
- Coordinates: 49°48′43″N 15°11′0″E
- Country: Czech Republic
- Region: Central Bohemian
- District: Kutná Hora
- First mentioned: 1260

Area
  - Total: 38.11 km^{2} (14.71 sq mi)
- Elevation: 502 m (1,647 ft)

Population (2026-01-01)
  - Total: 1,426
  - Density: 37.42/km^{2} (96.91/sq mi)
- Time zone: UTC+1 (CET)
  - Summer (DST): UTC+2 (CEST)
- Postal codes: 284 01, 285 21, 285 22
- Website: www.obeczbraslavice.cz

Zbraslavice (German: Sbraslawitz) is a municipality and village in Kutná Hora District in the Central Bohemian Region of the Czech Republic. It has about 1,400 inhabitants.

== Administrative division ==
Zbraslavice consists of 13 municipal parts (in brackets population according to the 2021 census):

- Zbraslavice (1,002)
- Borová (30)
- Chotěměřice t. Pančava (10)
- Hodkov (57)
- Kateřinky (32)
- Krasoňovice (31)
- Lipina (62)
- Malá Skalice (4)
- Ostrov (39)
- Radvančice (36)
- Rápošov (38)
- Útěšenovice (22)
- Velká Skalice (16)

== Etymology ==
The name is derived from the personal name Zbraslav, meaning "the village of Zbraslav's people".

== Geography ==
Zbraslavice is located about 16 kilometres (10 mi) south of Kutná Hora and 53 km (33 mi) southeast of Prague. It lies in the Upper Sázava Hills. The highest point is the hill Kopaniny at 552 m (1,811 ft) above sea level. The stream Hodkovský potok originates here, flows across the municipal territory and supplies several fishponds there.

== History ==
The first written mention of Zbraslavice is from 1260. It used to be a market town. In 1496, Zbraslavice was almost completely destroyed by a fire, only the local fortress survived. It had to be rebuilt, and the fortress was extended into a small castle.

== Demographics ==
Historical population

Year	Pop.	±%
1869	3,478	—
1880	3,223	−7.3%
1890	3,049	−5.4%
1900	2,894	−5.1%
1910	2,762	−4.6%

Year	Pop.	±%
1921	2,796	+1.2%
1930	2,591	−7.3%
1950	1,892	−27.0%
1961	1,876	−0.8%
1970	1,815	−3.3%

Year	Pop.	±%
1980	1,619	−10.8%
1991	1,497	−7.5%
2001	1,398	−6.6%
2011	1,377	−1.5%
2021	1,379	+0.1%

Source: Censuses

== Transport ==
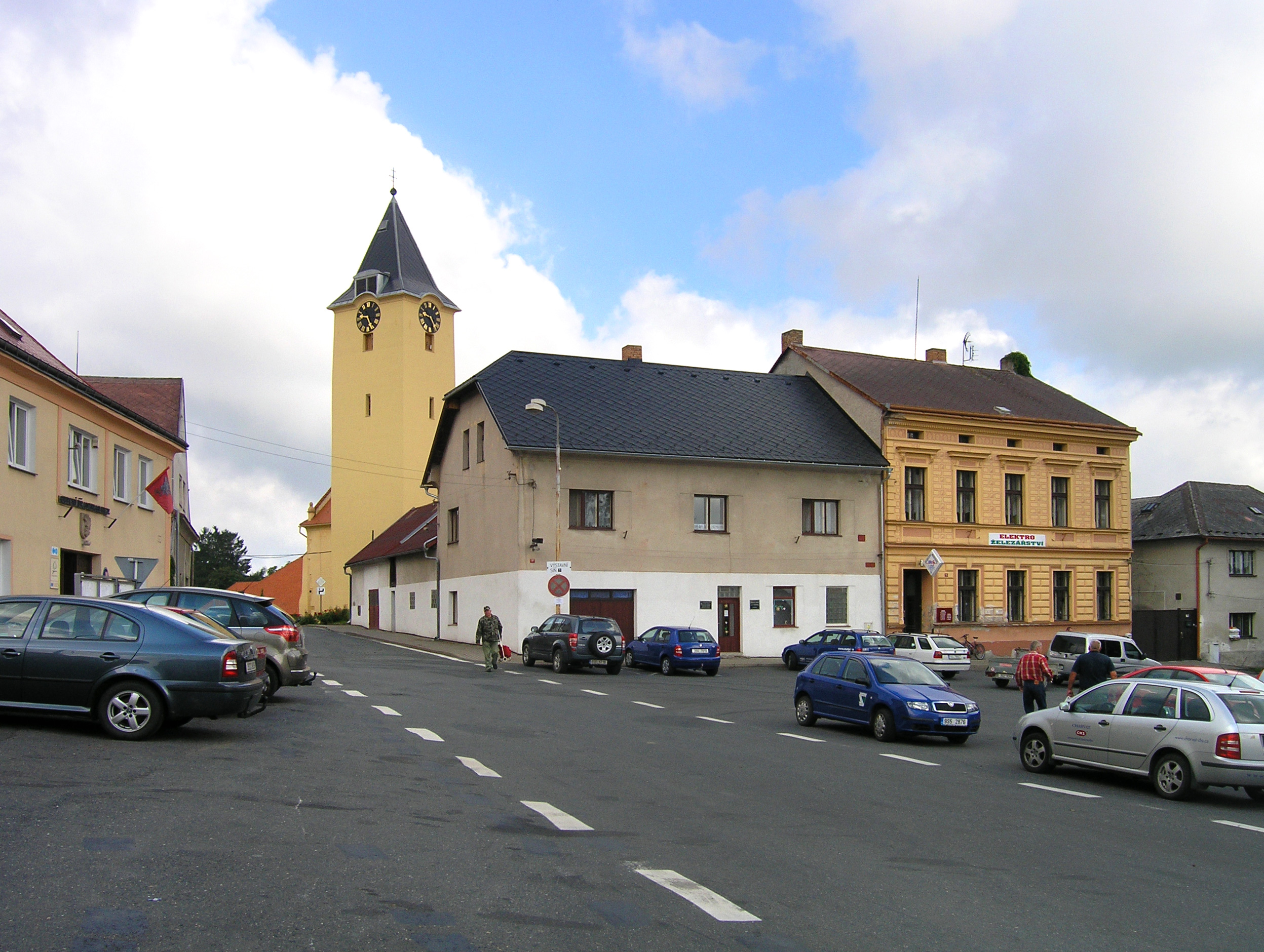
Centre of Zbraslavice

Zbraslavice is located on the railway line Kutná Hora–Zruč nad Sázavou.

== Sights ==
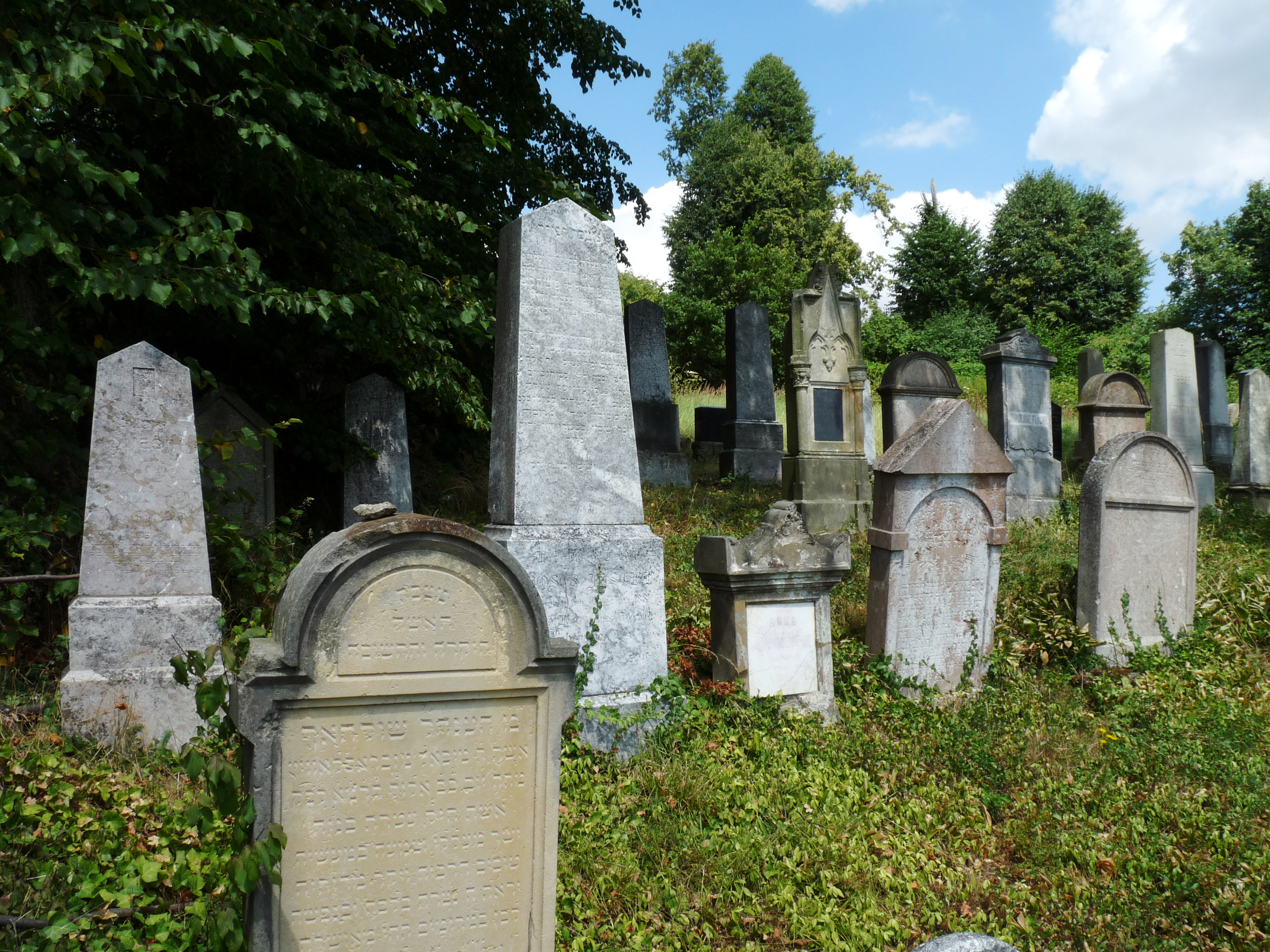
Jewish cemetery

The most important monument is the Church of Saint Lawrence. It was originally a Romanesque church from the late 12th century. Around the 14th century, Gothic modifications took place and the tower was added. Late Baroque modifications were made in the 18th century, but the church preserved its authentic Romanesque-Gothic look.

Zbraslavice Castle is a Renaissance castle from the 16th century, built on the site of the former fortress. Baroque modifications took place in the 18th century.

In the northern part of Zbraslavice is a well-preserved Jewish cemetery. It was founded at the end of the 18th century and used until 1932.
