= American Legend AL11 =

AL3 / AL11 / AL18
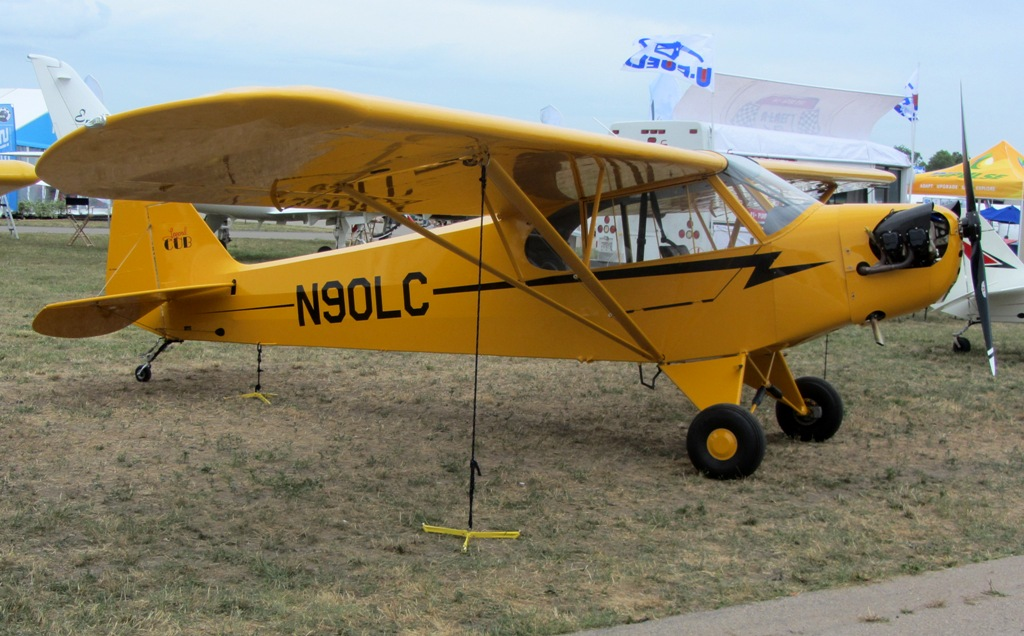
- AL3C-100 Legend Cub on display

General information
- Type: Sport aircraft
- National origin: United States of America
- Manufacturer: American Legend Aircraft Company
- Status: In production

The American Legend AL3, AL11, and AL18 are a series of American light-sport aircraft inspired by the Piper Cub family.

== Design ==
The Legend Cub is built closely along the lines of the original Piper Cub with modern materials, engines and instruments. The aircraft is a high-wing, tandem seat monoplane with conventional landing gear. The fuselage is constructed with welded steel tubing with doped Superflite aircraft fabric.

In April 2015 the Super Legend design was further developed with the addition of a greater number of carbon fibre components, including doors, floorboards, the propeller spinner and the wingtip bows. Avionic upgrades include Garmin G3X avionics and a FreeFlight Systems 1201 WAAS GPS sensor, Trig Mode S and 1090ES ADS-B Out transponder.

== Variants ==
Diesel Engine
In July 2015, American Legend Aircraft and Superior Air Parts (makers of the Gemini engine) announced that the 100-horsepower Gemini turbo-charged diesel engine would be available in 2016 as an option throughout the American Legend product line. The engine burns widely available Jet A and/or diesel fuel; an important consideration as normal aviation 100LL gasoline is expensive or unavailable in many remote areas. Power, price and weight are said to be comparable to the existing Continental O-200 avgas engine, but with a 20% lower fuel burn.
AL11C-100
Designed to resemble a Piper PA-11 Cub Special with an enclosed cowling.
AL3C-100
Designed to resemble a Piper J-3 Cub with cylinders exposed through the cowling.
AL11J-120
Powered with a 120 hp (89 kW) Jabiru 3300 engine.

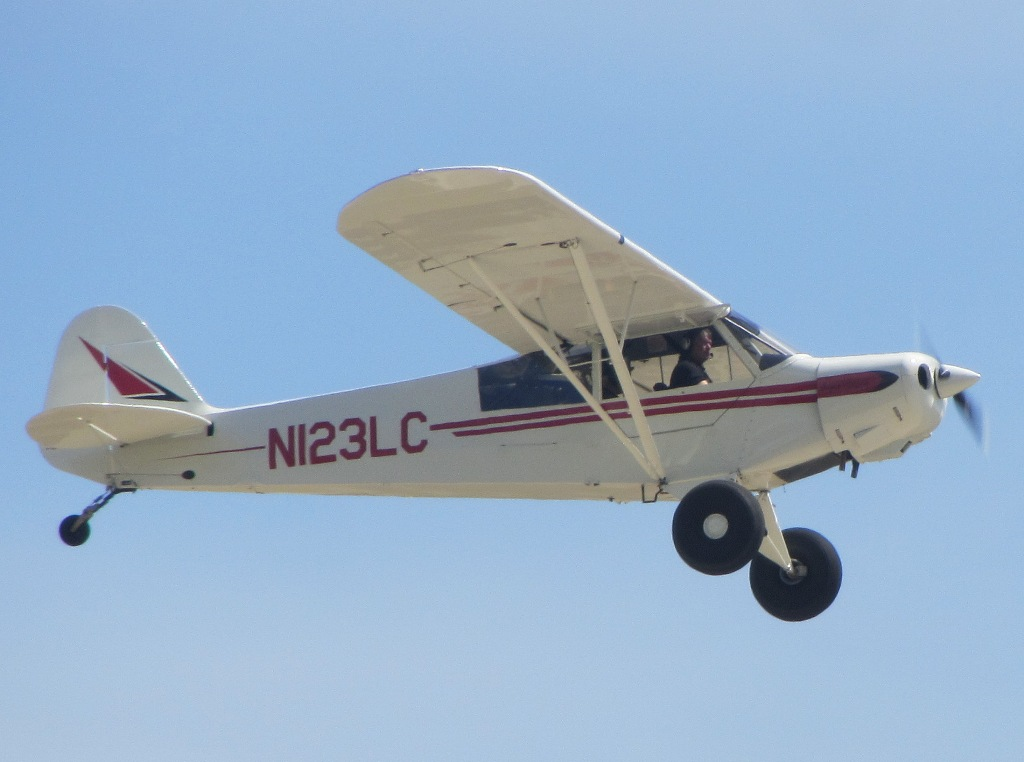
American Legend Super Legend

AL18 Super Legend
Lycoming IO-233 powered variant designed to resemble a Piper PA-18 Super Cub. Kevlar and carbon fiber floats certified for aircraft in 2015. 2015 Super Legend re-engined with Lycoming YO-233 115hp variant accepting 100LL AvGas and Automotive Fuel.

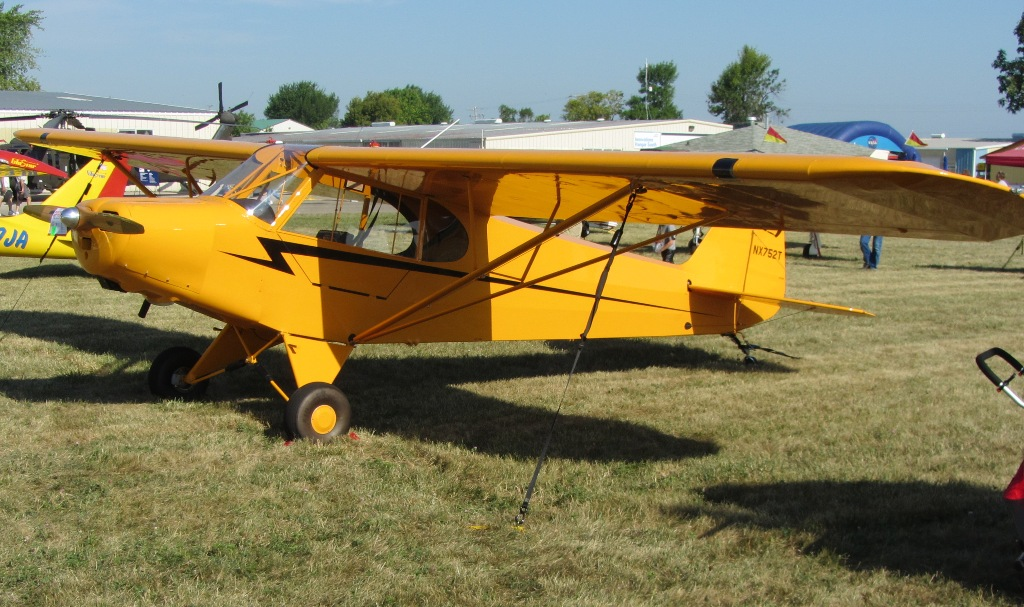
Texas Sport Cub

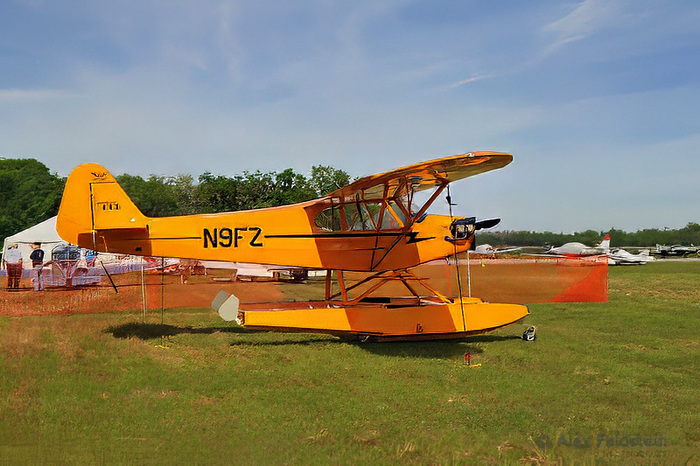
American Legend AL3C on floats at Sun-N-Fun

MOAC
The Mother of all Cubs model is a modification of the AL18 for back country flying and off-airport operations, with shock absorbing landing gear and a Continental Titan O-340 engine of 180 hp (134 kW). Introduced in July 2020, it features large flaps that deploy to 40°, leading-edge slats and square wingtips all intended to improve low-speed handling. The variant is available as a light-sport aircraft or homebuilt aircraft kit.
Texas Sport Cub
Homebuilt kit.

== Specifications (AL3C-100) ==
Data from Manufacturer

General characteristics

- Crew: 1
- Capacity: 1
- Length: 22 ft 5 in (6.83 m)
- Wingspan: 35 ft 6 in (10.82 m)
- Height: 6 ft 7 in (2.01 m)
- Empty weight: 835 lb (379 kg) For American Light Sport Aircraft
- Gross weight: 1,320 lb (599 kg)
- Fuel capacity: 22 U.S. gallons (83 L; 18 imp gal)
- Powerplant: 1 × Continental O-200 4-cylinder horiz. opposed, 100 hp (75 kW)

Performance

- Maximum speed: 94 kn (108 mph, 174 km/h)
- Cruise speed: 84 kn (97 mph, 156 km/h)
- Stall speed: 30 kn (35 mph, 56 km/h)
- Range: 274 nmi (315 mi, 507 km)
- Service ceiling: 15,000 ft (4,600 m)
- Rate of climb: 700 ft/min (3.6 m/s)

== See also ==
Aircraft of comparable role, configuration, and era

- CubCrafters CC11-100 Sport Cub S2
- Piper Cub
- Rans S-21 Outbound
