= Rans S-21 Outbound =

American homebuilt aircraft

S-21 Outbound
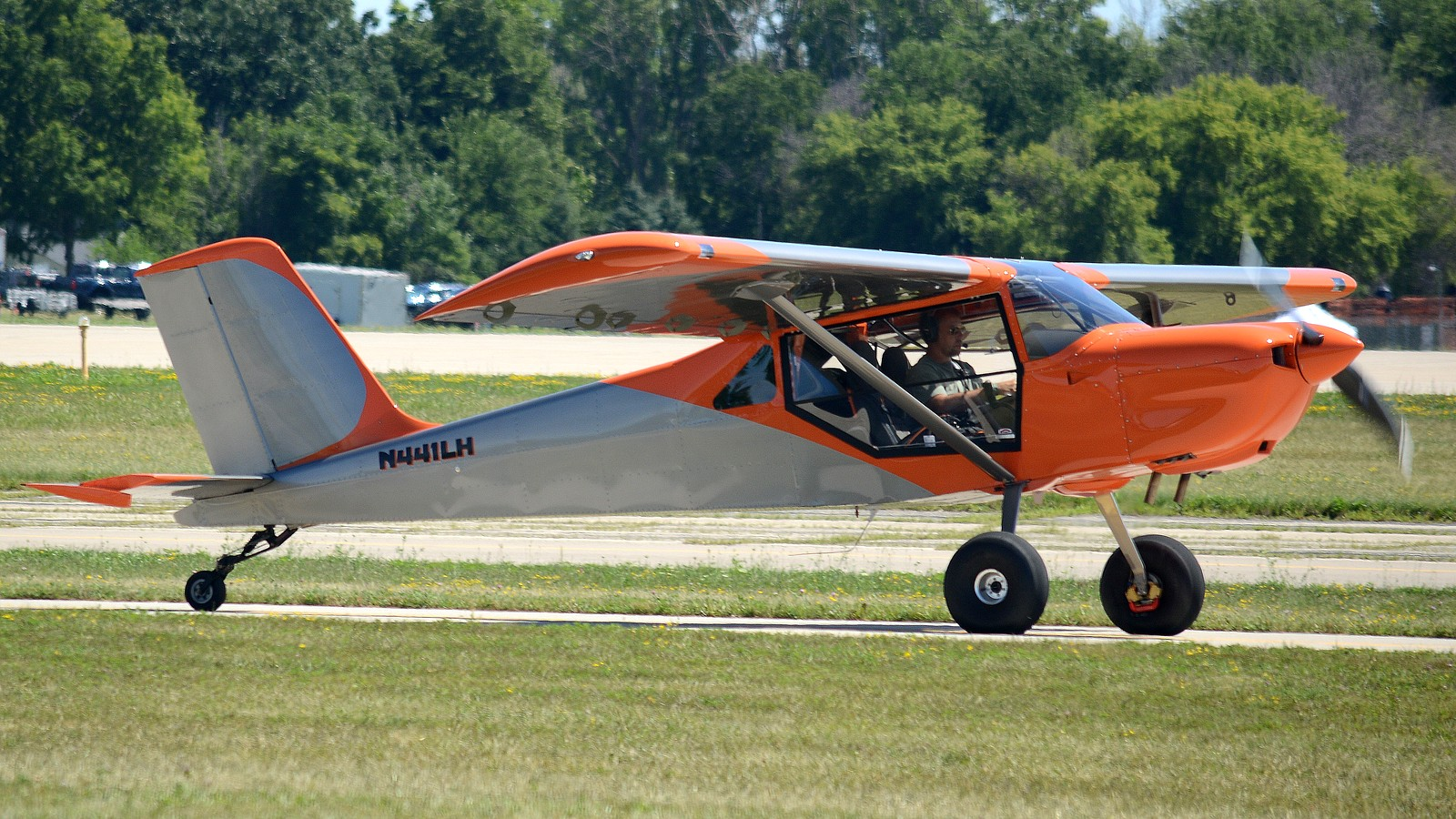

General information
- Type: Homebuilt aircraft Light-sport aircraft
- National origin: United States
- Manufacturer: Rans Designs
- Designer: Randy Schlitter
- Status: In production (2018)

History
- First flight: 15 December 2017

The Rans S-21 Outbound is an American STOL homebuilt aircraft that was designed by Randy Schlitter and is produced by Rans Designs of Hays, Kansas. It was introduced at AirVenture in 2016. The aircraft is supplied as a quick-build kit for amateur construction or ready-to-fly.

== Design and development ==
The S-21 Outbound features a strut-braced high-wing, a two-seats-in-side-by-side configuration enclosed cabin accessed via doors, fixed tricycle landing gear or optionally conventional landing gear and a single engine in tractor configuration.

The aircraft is made from aluminum sheet, with both leading edge and trailing edge extruded spars. The sheet metal parts employ final-size matched holes to reduce builder errors and speed construction. Its 28-foot (8.5 m) span wing mounts flaps and has a wing area of 141 square feet (13.1 m^{2}). The standard engine used is the 180-horsepower (130 kW) Continental Titan X-340 powerplant. Tundra tires up to 26 inches (660 mm) may be fitted.

The aircraft has a typical empty weight of 985 pounds (447 kg) and a gross weight of 1,800 pounds (820 kg), giving a useful load of 815 pounds (370 kg). With full fuel of 31.75 U.S. gallons (120.2 L; 26.44 imp gal) the payload for the crew/pilot, passengers and baggage is 625 pounds (283 kg).

The S-21 competes with the CubCrafters Carbon Cub EX and the American Legend Super Legend HP in the kit aircraft market.

The prototype, registered N215RD, first flew on 17 December 2017, it gained special light-sport aircraft approval in March 2018 with the Rotax 912 ULS, Rotax 912 iS, Lycoming YO-233 and Titan OX-340 engines.

== Operational history ==
In a review for KitPlanes magazine writer Dave Prizio stated that aircraft amateur builders, "seem to want a high-wing utility plane they can use to knock around the backcountry. It's nice to be able to get from here to there at 180 knots, but if there ends up being a 1200-foot dirt strip, an RV-8 doesn't look like the best choice for the trip. The point is that the utility plane is the hot ticket right now, and RANS seems to have come up with just the right plane at just the right time. And if the S-21 with a 100-hp Rotax is a good plane (it is), it is a better plane with 180 hp—a much better plane. This S-21 with the big engine and big tires was a hit at Sun 'n Fun 2019. Everyone wanted a demo ride in this popular new configuration of what is proving to be a very popular plane."

== Specifications (S-21 Outbound) ==
Data from Manufacturer and AVweb

General characteristics

- Crew: one
- Capacity: one passenger
- Length: 22 ft 4.92 in (6.83 m)
- Wingspan: 28 ft (8.5 m)
- Wing area: 141 sq ft (13.1 m^{2})
- Aspect ratio: 5.53:1
- Empty weight: 985 lb (447 kg)
- Gross weight: 1,800 lb (816 kg)
- Fuel capacity: 40.00 U.S. gallons (151.4 L; 33.31 imp gal) main tank, plus 5.00 U.S. gallons (18.9 L; 4.16 imp gal) header tank, total 45.00 U.S. gallons (170.3 L; 37.47 imp gal)
- Powerplant: 1 × Continental X-340 Titan four cylinder, air-cooled, four stroke aircraft engine, 180 hp (130 kW)

Performance

- Maximum speed: 150 mph (240 km/h, 130 kn)
- Stall speed: 38 mph (61 km/h, 33 kn)
- Never exceed speed: 215 mph (346 km/h, 187 kn)
- Range: 527 mi (848 km, 458 nmi)
- Endurance: 3.9 hours
- Service ceiling: 14,500 ft (4,400 m)
- g limits: +6/-4
- Maximum glide ratio: 11.1
- Wing loading: 12.76 lb/sq ft (62.3 kg/m^{2})
- Power/mass: 10 lb/hp
