= CC18 =

CC18 may ref to:

- CubCrafters CC18-180 Top Cub, an American light aircraft design
- Bukit Brown MRT station, a future MRT station in Singapore that will have the code CC18
