= Light Miniature Aircraft =

American aircraft manufacturer

- Company type: Privately held company
- Industry: Aerospace
- Founded: circa 1985
- Defunct: circa 2010
- Fate: Out of business
- Headquarters: Okeechobee, Florida, United States
- Products: Homebuilt aircraft plans

Light Miniature Aircraft was an American aircraft manufacturer based in Okeechobee, Florida. The company specialized in the design of ultralight aircraft and supplied plans for amateur construction.

The company seems to have gone out of business about 2010, but Wicks Aircraft continues to provide kits for the designs.

== Products ==
The company's LM-1, 2 and 3 family of aircraft were designed in the mid-1980s during the initial ultralight boom. At the time many pilots did not find the typical early "flying lawnchair" ultralights confidence inspiring or appealing. The company's designs were intended to fit the same FAR Part 103 rules, including its 254 lb (115 kg) empty weight, but provide aircraft that look and fly like a traditional light aircraft. However, many of the designs result in completed aircraft that are heavier than the US ultralight rule empty weight limit.

The LM-1 family of designs are built from wood, or optionally 4130 steel tube and finished with doped aircraft fabric covering. The completion involves minor changes in the cowling, window and tail shapes to make them resemble well-known light aircraft designs. The first in the series, the LM-1 is a single seat 75-85% scale replica of a Piper J-3 Cub and was first flown in 1985. The LM-2 is a single or two seat 75% scale replica of a Taylorcraft B, while the LM-3 is a single seat 75% scale replica of an Aeronca Champ. The follow-on Light Miniature Aircraft LM-5 is a full-sized tandem two-seat replica of the Piper PA-18 Super Cub.

The LM-J3-W is a full-sized two-seat J-3 Cub replica, while the LM-TC-W is a full-sized two-seats in side-by-side configuration Taylorcraft replica, both rendered in wood and fabric.

== Aircraft ==
Summary of aircraft design by Light Miniature Aircraft
Model name	First flight	Number built	Type
Light Miniature Aircraft LM-1	1985		Single seat 75-85% scale replica of the Piper J-3 Cub
Light Miniature Aircraft LM-2	1987		Single or two seat 75% scale replica of the Taylorcraft B
Light Miniature Aircraft LM-3	1987		Single seat 75% scale replica of the Aeronca Champ
Light Miniature Aircraft LM-5	1991	more than 35 (2007)	Tandem two-seat full-sized replica of a Piper PA-18 Super Cub
Light Miniature Aircraft LM-J3-W			Tandem two-seat full-sized replica of a Piper J-3 Cub
Light Miniature Aircraft LM-TC-W			Two-seat in side-by-side configuration full-sized replica of a Taylorcraft
