= CC19 =

CC19 may refer to:

- Botanic Gardens MRT station, an MRT station in Singapore with the code CC19
- CubCrafters CC19-180 XCub, an American light aircraft design
