= CubCrafters =

American aircraft manufacturer

Cub Crafters, Inc.
- Type: Corporation
- Industry: General Aviation
- Founded: 1980
- Founder: Jim Richmond
- Headquarters: Yakima, Washington
- Key people: Patrick Horgan - President and CEO
- Products: Kit aircraft, certified aircraft
- Number of employees: 150+
- Website: cubcrafters.com

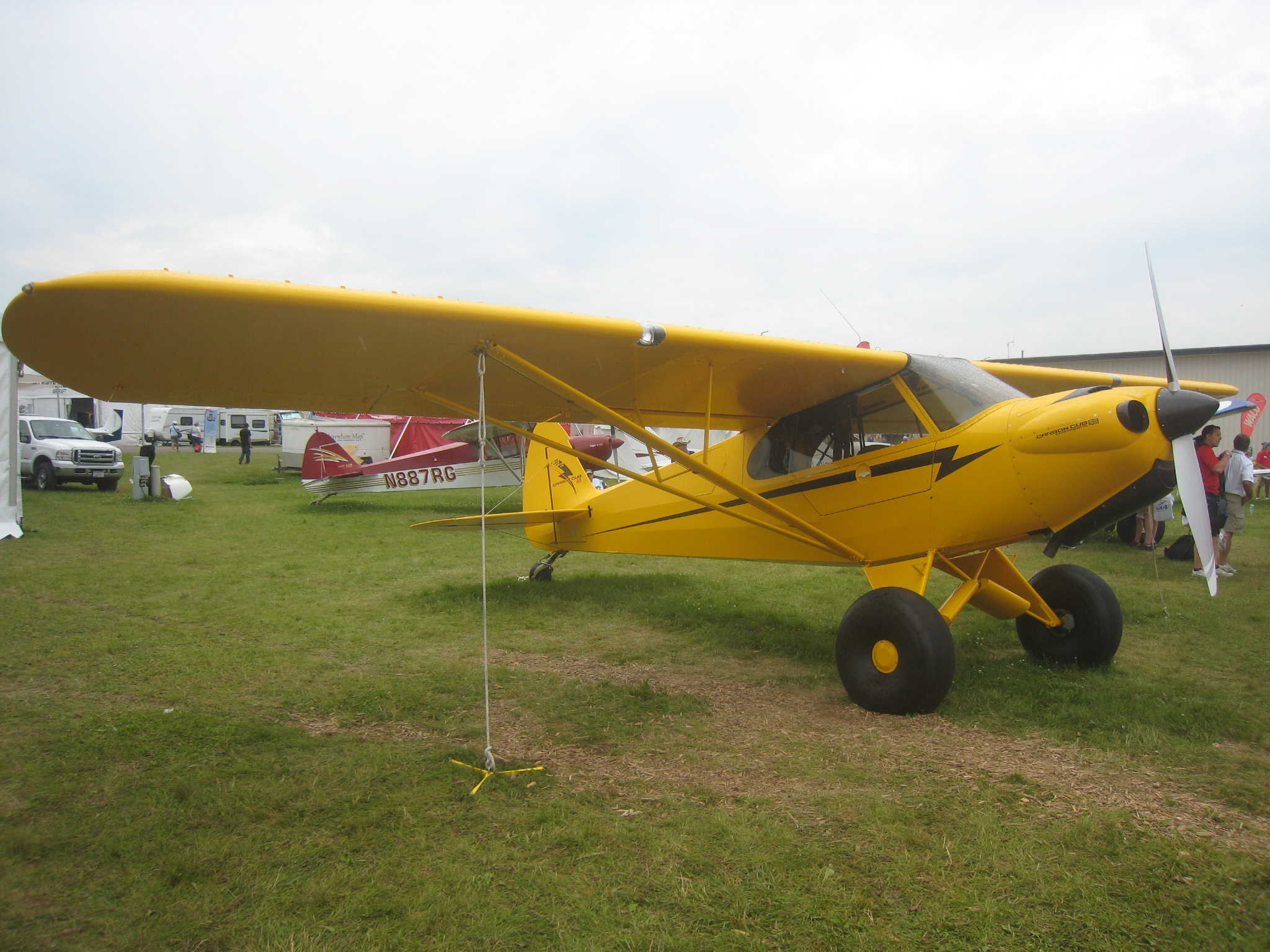
S3 Carbon Cub

Cub Crafters, Inc. (styled CubCrafters) is an aircraft manufacturer based in Yakima, Washington.

== History ==
The company was founded in 1980 by Jim Richmond to build parts and supplementary type certificate (STC) modifications for the Piper PA-18 Super Cub. Its CC18-180 Top Cub was Federal Aviation Administration-certified on December 16, 2004, and remained in production in February 2017.

The CC18-180 Top Cub was granted a type certificate (TC) by Transport Canada on 23 July 2008 and achieved Australian certification in August that year. In July 2015 the company announced that it had sold the TC for the CC18 to the Liaoning Cub Aircraft Corporation of China. CubCrafters licences the TC back to continue to produce the aircraft for the non-Chinese market. The Liaoning Cub Aircraft Corporation plans to produce the design for flight training, aerial photography, mapping, agriculture and personal use.

CubCrafters also produces a light-sport aircraft, the CC11-100 Sport Cub, based on the original Piper J-3 Cub's appearance. The Carbon Cub replaces many aluminium parts with carbon fiber to lighten the empty weight and allow for additional payload.

The company also has a service and overhaul facility for PA-18 Super Cubs and other Cub derivative designs.

In June 2016 the company introduced a new type certified design, the XCub, which had been secretly developed over six years.

In July 2022 the company announced that it intended to raise investment capital by selling preferred shares for US$5, with a minimum purchase of US$400, aimed at customers and aviation enthusiasts. The offer will be under the U.S. Securities and Exchange Commission's Regulation A, which exempts normal registration requirements imposed in a traditional initial public offering (IPO). AVweb noted it as "surely a first for a small aircraft company". In November 2022, the company earned a Securities and Exchange Commission “qualification” to make the US$50 million dollar public IPO.

In December 2022, the company acquired Summit Aircraft Skis of Sandpoint, Idaho, a manufacturer of aircraft skis.

On February 4, 2025, CubCrafters announced that the certified NX Cub had been selected by Embry–Riddle Aeronautical University as the official aircraft for the Golden Eagles Flight Team.

== Aircraft ==
- CC18 Top Cub
- CC18-180 Top Cub Certified version of the CC-18
- CC11-100 Sport Cub
- CC11-160 Carbon Cub SS
- CCX-1865 Carbon Cub FX
- CCK-1865 Carbon Cub EX Homebuilt version of the CCX-1865
- CCX-2000 Carbon Cub FX
- CCK-2000 Carbon Cub EX Homebuilt version of the CCX-2000
- CC19-180 XCub
- CC19-180 NXCub Tricycle landing gear variant of the CC19-180 XCub
- CCX-2300 Revised designation for the NXCub.
- Carbon Cub UL, introduced in 2023, powered by a 160 hp (119 kW) Rotax 916 iS
