= MOAC =

MOAC may refer to:

- Mid-Ohio Athletic Conference, an athletic league for high schools in Ohio, US
- Ministry of Agriculture and Cooperatives (Thailand)
- Cyclic pyranopterin monophosphate synthase, an enzyme
- American Legend MOAC, an American aircraft design
