= CubCrafters CC11-160 Carbon Cub SS =

Type of aircraft

CC11-160 Carbon Cub SS
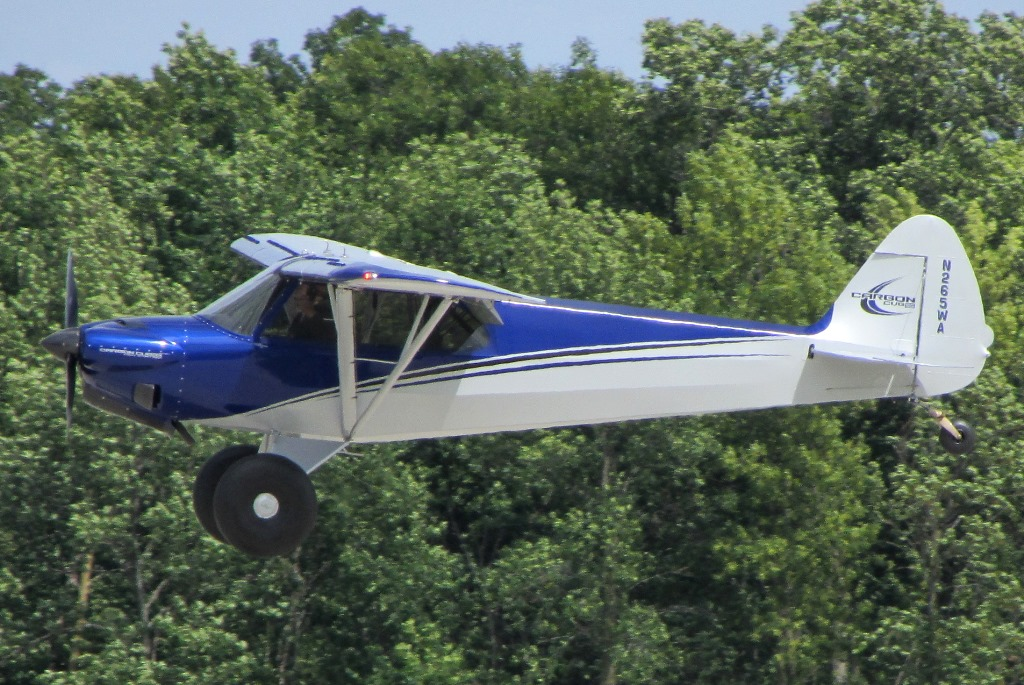
- Carbon Cub SS

General information
- Type: Light-sport aircraft
- National origin: United States
- Manufacturer: CubCrafters

History
- Developed from: CubCrafters CC11-100 Sport Cub S2
- Variant: CubCrafters Carbon Cub UL

The CubCrafters CC11-160 Carbon Cub SS is an ASTM certified light-sport aircraft based on the Piper J-3 Cub manufactured by CubCrafters. It is modernized with light-weight carbon fiber components and a 180 hp (130 kW) engine.

In January 2016, the Carbon Cub was named AVweb's "Airplane of the Year" for 2015.

In the year 2025, a Carbon Cub reached 37608ft near the coast of California.

== Development ==
The Carbon Cub SS was originally named the "CubCrafters Super Sport Cub". In order to maintain certification under American Light Sport Aircraft limitations the maximum takeoff power is limited to five minutes.

== Design ==
The Carbon Cub SS uses a carbon fiber spinner and air-induction scoop. The Carbon Cub weighs 300 pounds (140 kg) less than a Piper PA-18 Super Cub. The carbon cowling weighs six pounds (2.7 kg). The fuselage is welded SAE 4130 chrome-molybdenum steel tubing with fabric covering. The wings are fitted with vortex generators for low-speed flight control. Some models use a partial color on silver base coat paint job that weighs 11 pounds (5.0 kg) less than an all-color paint job.

The CC340 engine, based on the Lycoming O-320, is developed with Engine Components International, Inc. (ECi), using dual electronic ignition and ECi O-320 cylinders.

== Variants ==
CubCrafters CC11-100 Sport Cub S2
An O-200 powered LSA variant
CubCrafters Carbon Cub EX
An experimental kit variant of the Carbon Cub SS with a gross weight of 1,865 lb (846 kg).

== Specifications (Carbon Cub SS) ==
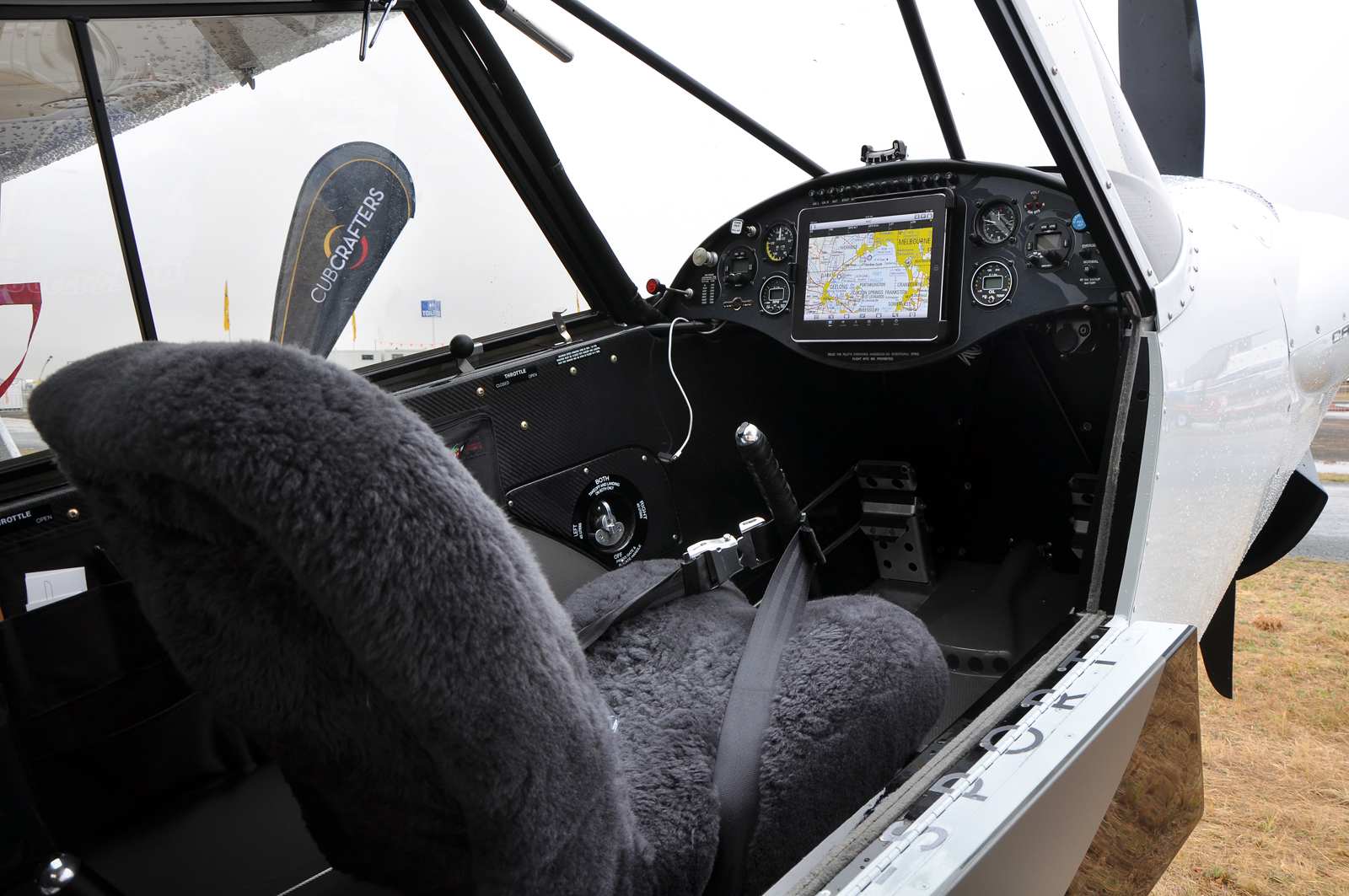
Carbon Cub SS cockpit

Data from Flying

General characteristics

- Capacity: 2
- Length: 22.75 ft (6.93 m)
- Wingspan: 34.25 ft (10.44 m)
- Height: 9.25 ft (2.82 m)
- Wing area: 171.9 sq ft (15.97 m^{2})
- Aspect ratio: 5.2-1
- Airfoil: USA35(B)
- Empty weight: 896 lb (399 kg)
- Gross weight: 1,320 lb (599 kg)
- Fuel capacity: 24 US gallons (91 L) usable in 25 US gal (95 L) tank
- Powerplant: 1 × CC340 horizontally-opposed piston engine, 180 hp (130 kW) for maximum of 5 minutes, 80 hp continuous. The short term increased output is suitable for short field takeoff and initial higher rate of climb. In level flight, 80 hp produces 76.3% of the speed produced by 180 hp, the cube root of 80/180.
- Propellers: 2-bladed CATTO composite propeller

Performance

- Maximum speed: 88 kn (101 mph, 163 km/h) Vno, the boundary between green and yellow on the airspeed indicator.
- Stall speed: 27 kn (31 mph, 50 km/h) out of ground effects, without assistance of engine power, with full flaps; 35 kn (65 km/h) without use of flaps.
- Never exceed speed: 123 kn (141 mph, 227 km/h) Vne, boundary between yellow and red on the airspeed indicator, achievable in powered flight pitched for dive with 1G wing loading in smooth air.
- Range: 390 nmi (450 mi, 720 km) maximum, using 24.0 gal of fuel, with 1.0 gal unusable remaining in tank, with no reserve fuel.
- Ferry range: 650 nmi (750 mi, 1,210 km) with increased fuel capacity of optional extended range fuel tank.
- Service ceiling: 17,999 ft (5,486 m)
- Rate of climb: 2,100 ft/min (11 m/s) using 180 hp, no flaps, below gross weight.
- Wing loading: 7.37 lb/sq ft (36.0 kg/m^{2})
- Thrust/weight: 7.33 per hp
