= Rotax 916 iS =

Aircraft engine

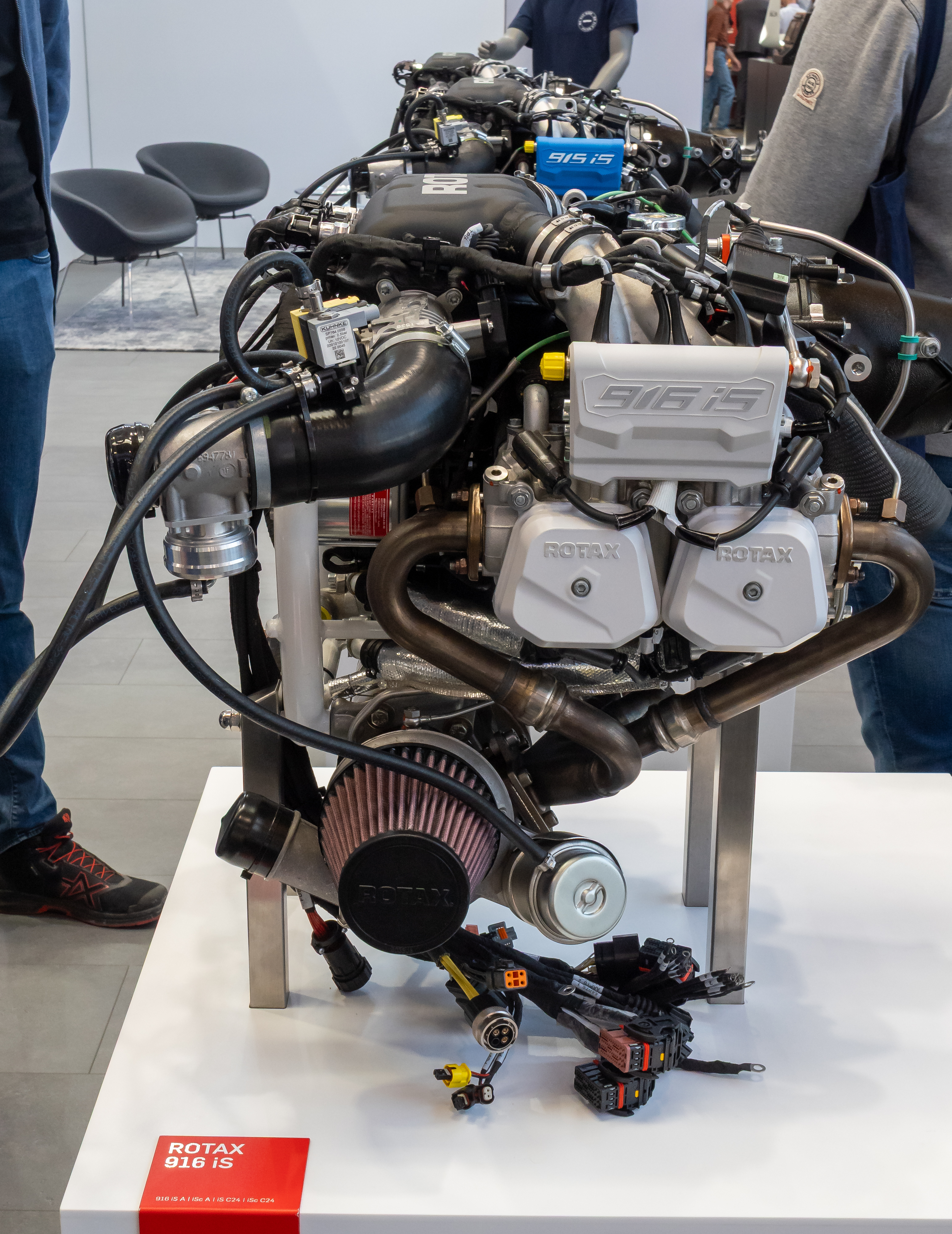
- Type: Piston aircraft engine
- National origin: Austria
- Manufacturer: Rotax
- Major applications: CubCrafters Carbon Cub UL
- Developed from: Rotax 915 iS

The Rotax 916 iS is an Austrian piston aircraft engine, designed and produced by Rotax of Gunskirchen for use in light aircraft, light sport, ultralight, homebuilt aircraft and Unmanned aerial vehicle.

The engine was publicly introduced in March 2023 and first used in the CubCrafters Carbon Cub UL.

== Design and development ==
The engine is a turbocharged four-cylinder, four-stroke, horizontally-opposed, 1,352 cc (82.5 cu in) displacement, gasoline engine design, with a mechanical gearbox reduction drive with a reduction ratio of 2.54:1. It employs dual electronic ignition and produces 160 hp (120 kW) at 5,800 rpm for takeoff and 137 hp (102 kW) at 5,500 rpm continuous operation, with a maximum operating altitude of 23,000 ft (7,000 m).

It has electronic fuel injection; air cooling, with liquid-cooled cylinder heads; a stainless steel exhaust system; a dry sump, forced lubrication system with a separate oil tank and a 12 volt or 24 volt electrical system.

In order to enable the increased takeoff power while maintaining a 2,000 hour TBO, multiple changes were made to handle the increased thermal and mechanical stresses. To deal with the increase in horsepower, the drivetrain features reinforced pistons, redesigned piston rings, and new main bearings with improved protective coatings. A larger intercooler and oil radiator are specified to dissipate additional heat. The crankcase has been reinforced around the main webs for added strength. The oil system has additional squirters to provide an increased volume of oil for cooling. An updated muffler lowers back-pressure for better turbo control, and features a new after-muffler to enable compliance with stricter noise restrictions in Europe. The engine oil has a new formulation and supplier, which is also authorized for use on other 9-series engines. Compared to the 915is, the 916is achieves the same maximum continuous power with 10-20% lower fuel consumption.

The initial time between overhaul is 2,000 hours.

== Operational history ==
The Rotax 916 iS was chosen to power the CubCrafters Carbon Cub UL due to the engine's light weight and ability to burn unleaded automotive gasoline, to facilitate exports to areas of the globe where avgas is not available, such as South America and Africa.

Cub Crafters said of the engine that the "key to the development of the new aircraft is CubCrafters’ collaboration with BRP-Rotax, which is launching their new 160 HP turbocharged engine on the Carbon Cub UL. The new 916 iS engine is lighter, more fuel efficient, and can produce more power than the normally aspirated CC340 engine on the Carbon Cub SS in higher density altitude scenarios."

== Applications ==
- CubCrafters Carbon Cub UL
- Zlin Aviation Norden UL and LSA
- Elbit Hermes 900
- TL-Ultralight Sport Sparker
- Sling (TSi, HW)
- SW-51 Mustang
- JMB VL-3
- Bristell 916RG Turbo

== Specifications (916 iS) ==
Data from Manufacturer

=== General characteristics ===
- Type: Four cylinder, four stroke aircraft engine
- Bore: 84.0 mm (3.3 in)
- Stroke: 61.0 mm (2.4 in)
- Displacement: 1,352 cc (82.5 cu in)
- Dry weight: 85.8 kg (189.2 lb), including propeller speed reduction gearbox with overload clutch, turbocharger, intercooler and exhaust system

=== Components ===
- Turbocharger: intercooled
- Fuel system: electronic fuel injection
- Fuel type: gasoline minimum MON 85, RON 95, AKI 91, leaded or unleaded, avgas 100LL, maximum ethanol 10%
- Oil system: dry sump, forced lubrication with separate oil tank
- Cooling system: air cooled with liquid cooled cylinder heads
- Reduction gear: mechanical gearbox, 2.54:1 ratio

=== Performance ===
- Power output: 160 hp (119 kW) at 5800 rpm for takeoff, 137 hp (102 kW) at 5500 rpm continuous

== See also ==
Related lists

- List of aircraft engines
