= CubCrafters Carbon Cub UL =

American light kit airplane

Carbon Cub UL
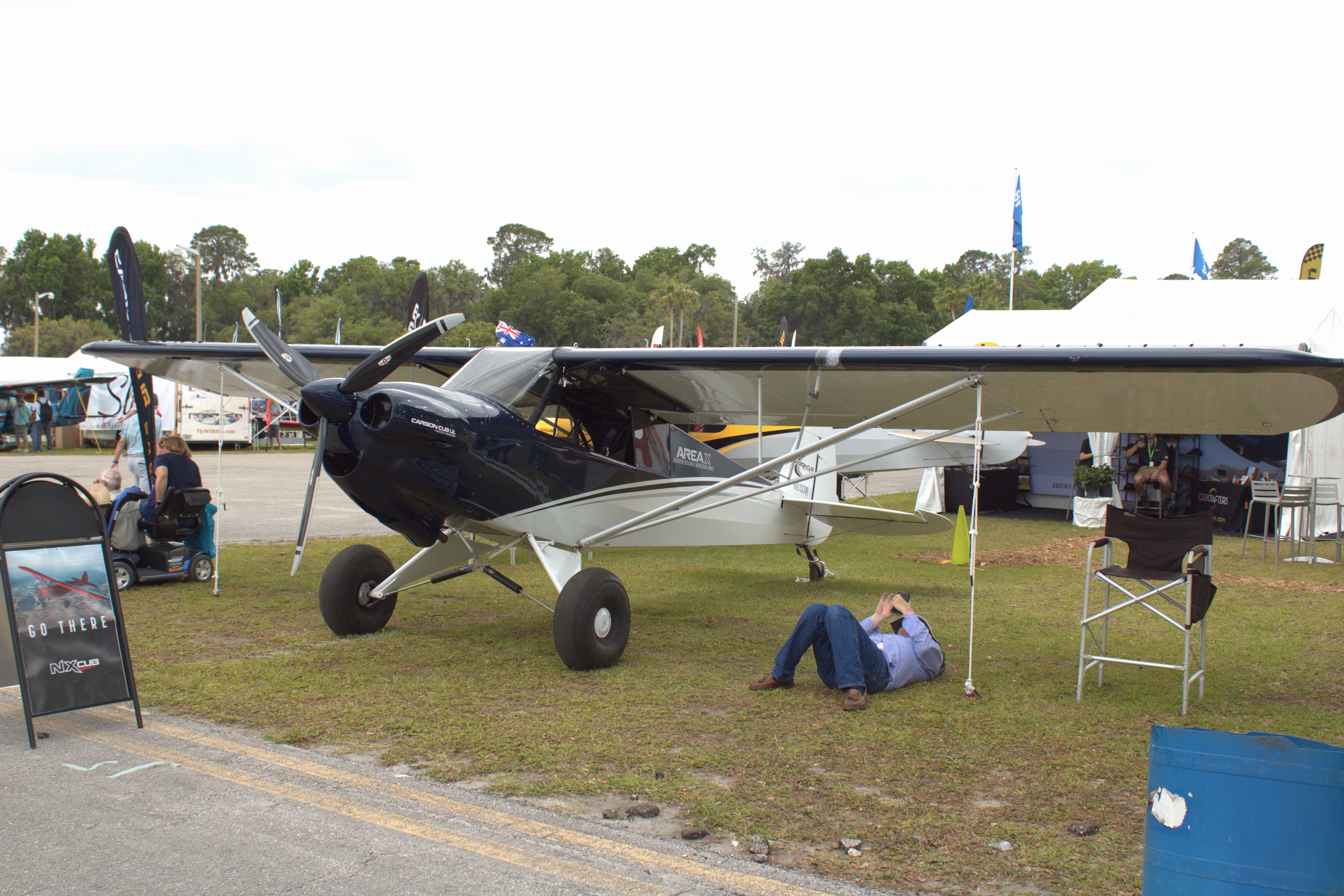
- Carbon Cub UL at 2024 Sun 'n Fun

General information
- Type: Light-sport aircraft
- National origin: United States
- Manufacturer: Cub Crafters
- Status: Under development (2023)

History
- Introduction date: March 2023
- First flight: 2023
- Developed from: CubCrafters CC11-160 Carbon Cub SS

The CubCrafters Carbon Cub UL is an American light-sport and ultralight aircraft that is under development by Cub Crafters of Yakima, Washington, introduced at the Sun 'n Fun airshow in March 2023. The aircraft is intended to be supplied as a kit for amateur construction or as a complete ready-to-fly-aircraft.

Still under development in March 2023, the first customer deliveries are forecast for 2025.

== Design and development ==
The design is a development of the CubCrafters CC11-160 Carbon Cub SS that has been lightened to improve performance, including the newly designed Rotax 916 iS engine, for which this aircraft is the launch customer.

It has been designed to fit the US light-sport aircraft category with a 1,320 lb (599 kg) gross weight and also many other nations' ultralight aircraft categories, to facilitate exports.

The aircraft features a strut-braced high-wing with jury struts, a two-seats-in-tandem enclosed cockpit accessed by doors, fixed conventional landing gear and a single engine in tractor configuration.

The aircraft is made from welded steel tubing, with its flying surfaces covered in doped aircraft fabric. Use is made of pre-preg composite materials, lighter fabric and titanium components, including the firewall and landing gear, to reduce the empty weight. The standard engine used is the 160 hp (119 kW) Rotax 916 iS four-stroke, turbocharged, liquid and air-cooled powerplant, with FADEC, which can run on unleaded automotive gasoline or avgas. Due to its turbocharger, the engine can produce full power up to 17,000 ft (5,182 m).

Regarding the choice of powerplants for the design, aviation writer Paul Bertorelli stated, "the 916 iS gives CubCrafters an uncharacteristic opportunity to shear away from driving increased performance with power loading to driving it with structural efficiency".

The development was forecast to be completed later in 2023, a demonstrator in 2024 and with the first customer deliveries forecast for 2025.

On February 25, 2025, CubCrafters, in collaboration with Hartzell Propeller, announced the development of a lightweight constant-speed propeller designed specifically for the Rotax 916-powered Carbon Cub UL.

== Operational history ==
The prototype was landed on the 88 ft (27 m) diameter rooftop helipad at the Burj Al Arab hotel in Dubai on March 15, 2023, as a Red Bull sponsored stunt.

On October 28, 2025, a CubCrafters Carbon Cub UL, piloted by Jon Kotwicki, climbed to a verified altitude of 37,609 feet (11,463 m) over the California coast near San Luis Obispo, California, setting an unofficial altitude record for Cub-type aircraft. The flight surpassed a previous record of 30,203 feet (9,206 m) set in 1951 by pilot Caro Bayley flying a Piper Super Cub.

== Specifications (Carbon Cub UL) ==
Data from AvWeb and KitPlanes

General characteristics

- Crew: one
- Capacity: one passenger
- Gross weight: 1,320 lb (599 kg)
- Powerplant: 1 × Rotax 916 iS four cylinder, liquid and air-cooled, four stroke aircraft engine, 160 hp (120 kW)
- Propellers: 3-bladed fixed pitch or constant speed propeller

== See also ==
- List of aircraft
