= CubCrafters Carbon Cub EX =

American amateur-built aircraft

Carbon Cub EX
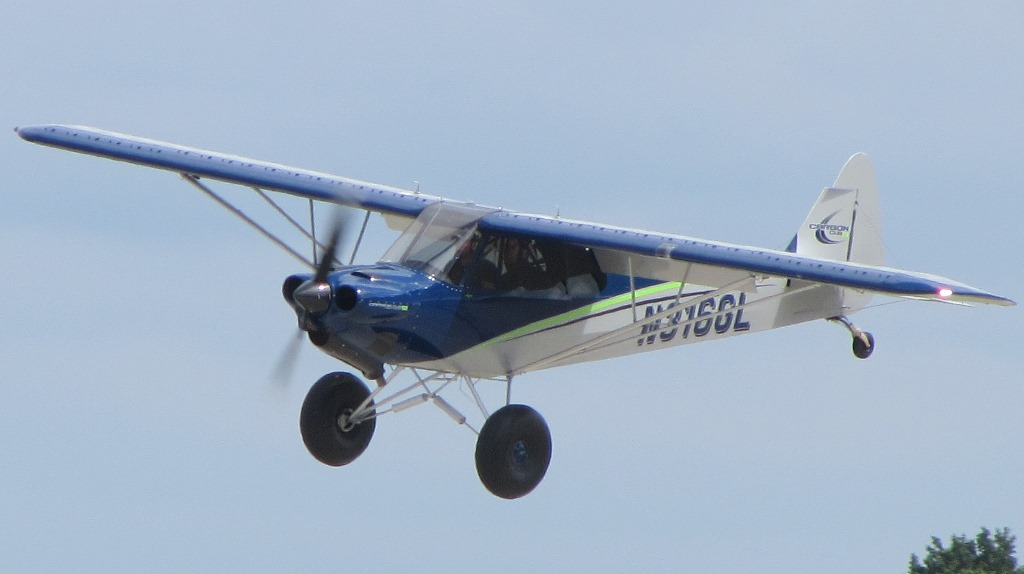

General information
- Type: Amateur-built aircraft
- National origin: United States
- Manufacturer: Cub Crafters
- Status: In production as of 2024

History
- Developed from: Piper PA-18 Super Cub
- Variant: CubCrafters XCub

The CubCrafters Carbon Cub EX (EX - Experimental) is an American amateur-built aircraft, designed and produced by Cub Crafters of Yakima, Washington. The aircraft is supplied as a kit for amateur construction.

== Design and development ==
The Carbon Cub EX features a strut-braced high-wing, a two-seats-in-tandem enclosed cockpit that is 24 in (61 cm) wide and accessed via a door, fixed conventional landing gear and a single engine in tractor configuration. The design is related to the company's CubCrafters Carbon Cub SS light-sport aircraft, but adapted to the US experimental amateur-built category.

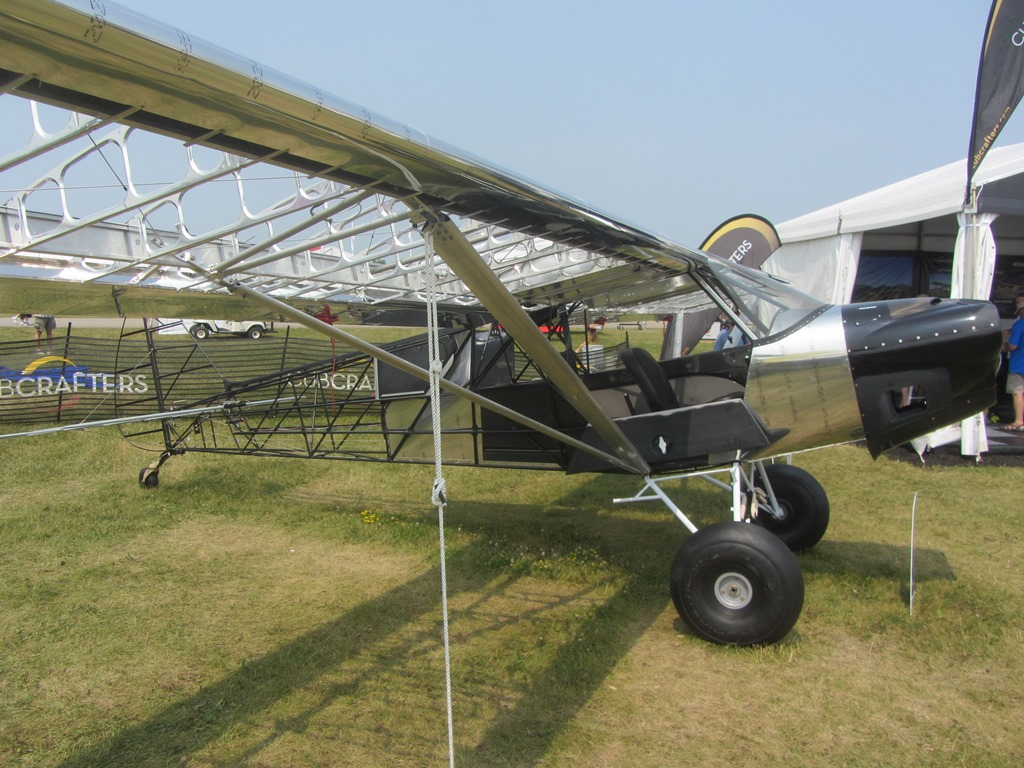
Fuselage of a CubCrafters Carbon Cub

The aircraft's airframe is made from welded steel tubing, aluminum and the judicious use of carbon fiber, covered in doped aircraft fabric. Its 34.2 ft (10.4 m) span wing has an area of 179 sq ft (16.6 m^{2}) and mounts flaps. The aircraft's recommended engine power is 100 to 180 hp (75 to 134 kW) and standard engines used include the 100 hp (75 kW) Continental O-200, the 180 hp (134 kW) Lycoming O-360 and the 180 hp (134 kW) ECi CC340 four-stroke powerplant. Construction time from the supplied kit ranges from 700 to 1100 hours (Depending on builder experience).

In August 2022, a new engine option was introduced, the 186 hp (139 kW) CC363i F/P, equipped with a constant-speed propeller.

== Operational history ==
By December 2016 four examples had been registered in the United States with the Federal Aviation Administration and six with Transport Canada.

== Variants ==
Carbon Cub EX-2
Kit built variant
CubCrafters EX-2 363i
Kit version introduced in December 2022 with a Lycoming/CC 363i 186 hp (139 kW) engine.
Carbon Cub EX-3
Kit built variant with a Superior Air Parts CC363i engine and increased gross weight.
Carbon Cub FX-2
Factory-builder assist variant
Carbon Cub FX-3
Factory-builder assist variant with a Superior Air Parts CC363i engine and increased gross weight.

== Specifications (Carbon Cub EX) ==
Data from Kitplanes

General characteristics

- Crew: one
- Capacity: one passenger
- Length: 23.3 ft (7.1 m)
- Wingspan: 34.2 ft (10.4 m)
- Wing area: 179 sq ft (16.6 m^{2})
- Empty weight: 950 lb (431 kg)
- Gross weight: 1,865 lb (846 kg)
- Fuel capacity: 25 U.S. gallons (95 L; 21 imp gal)
- Powerplant: 1 × ECi CC340 four cylinder, air-cooled, four stroke aircraft engine, 180 hp (130 kW)
- Propellers: 2-bladed fixed pitch propeller

Performance

- Cruise speed: 115 mph (185 km/h, 100 kn)
- Stall speed: 32 mph (51 km/h, 28 kn)
- Range: 400 mi (640 km, 350 nmi)
- Rate of climb: 2,100 ft/min (11 m/s)
- Wing loading: 10.4 lb/sq ft (51 kg/m^{2})
