= Light Miniature Aircraft LM-5 =

American light aircraft

General information
- Type: Ultralight aircraft
- National origin: United States
- Manufacturer: Light Miniature Aircraft
- Status: Plans no longer available, kits still available
- Number built: more than 35 (2007)

History
- Introduction date: 1991
- First flight: 1991

The Light Miniature Aircraft LM-5 series is a family of American high-wing, conventional landing gear, strut-braced, single-engine ultralight aircraft that are intended to resemble the Piper PA-18 Super Cub. The designs are all available as plans from Light Miniature Aircraft of Okeechobee, Florida for amateur construction.

The Light Miniature Aircraft company website domain name expired on 25 May 2010 and has not been renewed. The company seems to have gone out of business about 2010, but Wicks Aircraft continues to provide kits for the designs.

== Design and development ==
The LM-5 design is rendered in wood or optionally aluminum and covered in doped aircraft fabric. The aircraft are sold as plans, with components or complete kits also available to speed construction time.

Unlike the company's LM-1 series which are scale representations of famous general aviation aircraft, the LM-5 series are the same size as the PA-18 that they resemble.

== Variants ==
LM-5X Super Cub
Tandem two-seat full-sized replica of a Piper PA-18 Super Cub, powered by a 64 hp (48 kW) Rotax 582 or Volkswagen air-cooled engine. Built from aluminum and covered in doped aircraft fabric. Empty weight 620 lb (281 kg), gross weight 1,040 lb (472 kg). The LM-5X was first flown in 1991 and was still available in 2010.
LM-5X-W Super Cub
Tandem two-seat full-sized replica of a Piper PA-18 Super Cub, powered by a 64 hp (48 kW) Rotax 582 or Volkswagen air-cooled engine. Built from wood and covered in doped aircraft fabric. Empty weight 775 lb (352 kg), gross weight 1,275 lb (578 kg). Still available in 2010.

== Specifications (LM-5X-W Super Cub) ==
Data from Kitplanes

General characteristics

- Crew: one
- Capacity: one passenger
- Length: 22 ft 7 in (6.88 m)
- Wingspan: 36 ft 1 in (11.00 m)
- Wing area: 180 sq ft (17 m^{2})
- Empty weight: 775 lb (352 kg)
- Gross weight: 1,275 lb (578 kg)
- Fuel capacity: 12 US gallons (46 litres)
- Powerplant: 1 × Rotax 582 twin cylinder, two-stroke aircraft engine, 64 hp (48 kW)
- Propellers: 2-bladed wooden propeller

Performance

- Maximum speed: 95 mph (153 km/h, 83 kn)
- Cruise speed: 80 mph (130 km/h, 70 kn)
- Stall speed: 36 mph (58 km/h, 31 kn)
- Range: 290 mi (470 km, 250 nmi)
- Rate of climb: 750 ft/min (3.8 m/s)

== See also ==
Aircraft of comparable role, configuration, and era

- Piper PA-18
