= CubCrafters CC19 XCub =

American light aircraft

CC19 XCub
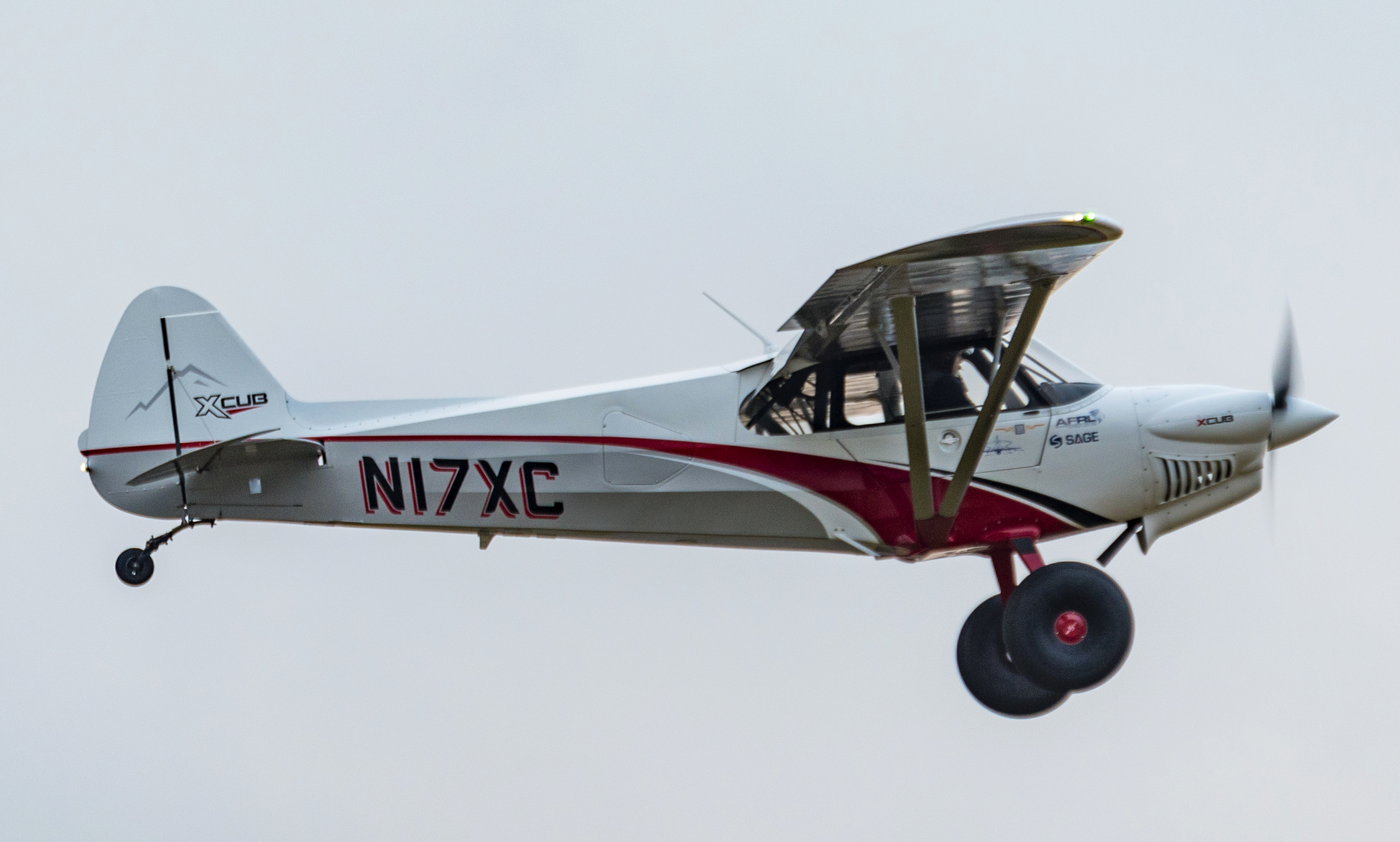
- CubCrafters CC19-180 XCub

General information
- Type: Light aircraft
- National origin: United States
- Manufacturer: CubCrafters
- Status: In production (2016)
- Number built: 20 (July 2016)

History
- Introduction date: June 2016
- Developed from: CubCrafters Carbon Cub EX

The CubCrafters CC19 XCub is an American light aircraft, designed and produced by CubCrafters of Yakima, Washington, introduced in June 2016. The aircraft is supplied complete and ready-to-fly.

== Development ==
The XCub is a development of the CubCrafters Carbon Cub EX, with higher performance and incorporating even more carbon fiber in the structure. It traces its lineage to the 1949-vintage Piper PA-18 Super Cub design.

The XCub was developed in secret over a six-year period, 2010–2016, and was not publicly announced until Federal Aviation Administration (FAA) FAR 23 type certification had been completed. The certification process was completed using company internal resources and did not involve any venture capital, loans or customer deposits.

Type certification for day and night visual flight rules was granted by the FAA on 2 June 2016. The CC19-180 was Type Certified by the European Aviation Safety Agency on 17 December 2017 and in Canada and Japan in August 2018.

On 26 March 2019 the aircraft was also certified by the FAA in the primary aircraft category, for reasons that the company has not disclosed.

== Design ==
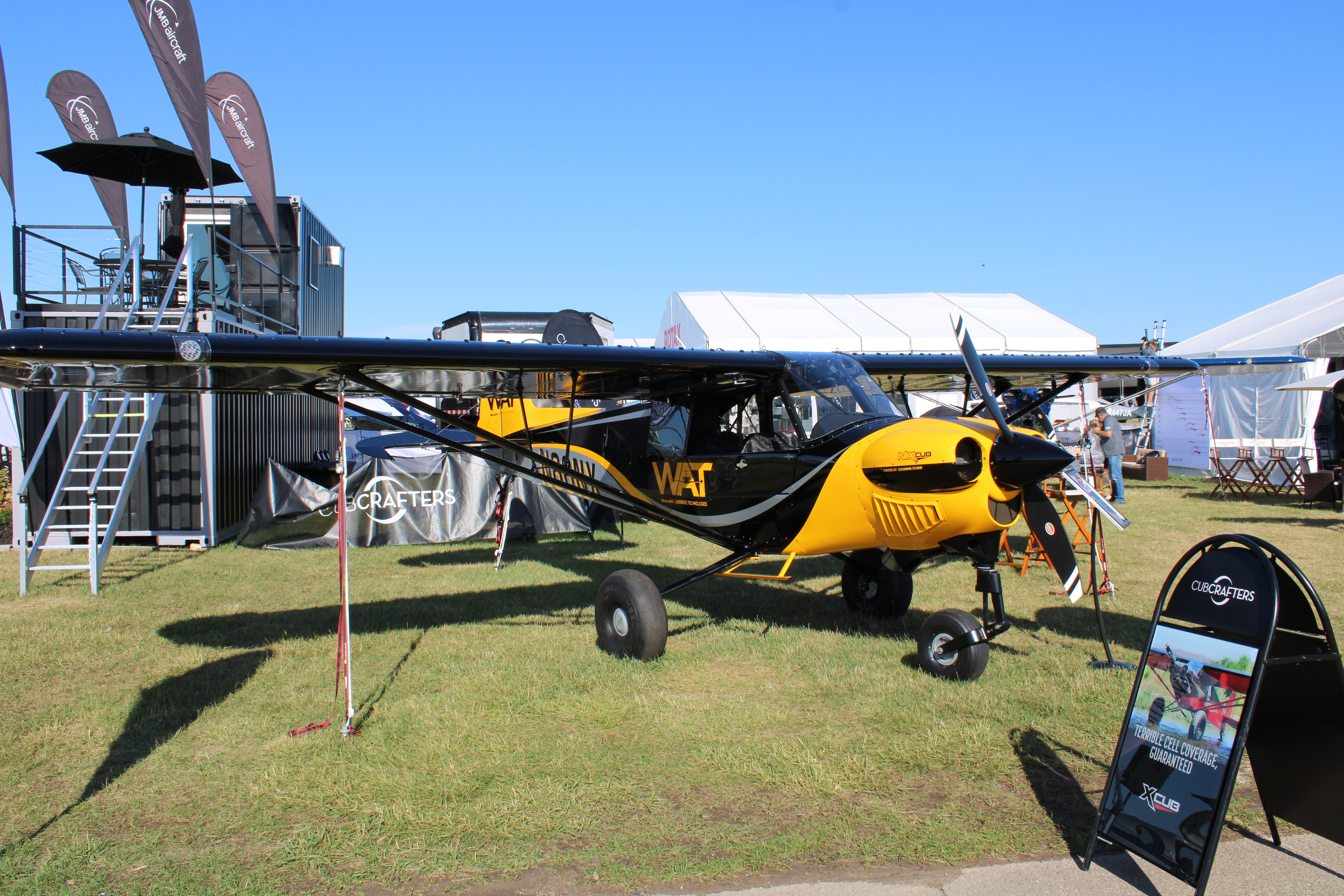
Tricycle-gear CC19-215 NXCub

The aircraft features a V-strut-braced high-wing, a two-seats-in-tandem enclosed cockpit accessed via doors, fixed aluminium sprung conventional landing gear and a single engine in tractor configuration.

The aircraft is made from welded CNC-milled 4130 steel tubing, with its flying surfaces covered in doped aircraft fabric. Its 34.3 ft (10.5 m) span wing has an area of 174.8 sq ft (16.24 m^{2}) and mounts flaps. The controls are driven by torque tubes, instead of cables, with the aileron tubes running inside the V-struts. The standard engine available is the 180 hp (134 kW) Lycoming O-360-C1 (CC363i) four-stroke powerplant, driving a Hartzell Trailblazer composite, constant speed propeller. In July 2019 a 215 hp (160 kW) version powered by a Lycoming IO-390 (CC393i) engine and a Hartzell Pathfinder three-bladed propeller was introduced as the CC19-215. The new powerplant requires a new cowling and baffles.

The aircraft has an empty weight of 1,216 lb (552 kg) and a gross weight of 2,300 lb (1,000 kg), giving a useful load of 1,084 lb (492 kg).

The take-off and landing distance required at maximum gross weight has been demonstrated as 170 ft (52 m).

In 2020 the manufacturer certified a new version of the design, the NXCub, (Nosewheel XCub) with tricycle landing gear, only available with the Lycoming IO-390 (CC393i) engine. With additional parts, an XCub or NXCub can be readily converted between conventional and tricycle landing gear configurations, with NXCub simply being the model designation for aircraft factory-built with tricycle landing gear. The task of converting an aircraft requires two people and takes around four hours. An XCub or NXCub can also be fitted with floats.

== Operational history ==
In reviewing the CC19-180 in June 2016 after an evaluation flight, AOPA reviewer Dave Hirschman concluded, "the 153-mph true airspeed top speed in level flight is impressive, but what’s far more meaningful to backcountry pilots is the tremendous range and operational flexibility they’ll have at more economical cruise settings. At a true airspeed of 120 mph, for example, an XCub pilot can cut fuel burn to 6 gph or less and have about eight hours endurance from a full tank (50 gallons) of avgas. At a normal Super Cub cruise of 100 mph, the XCub can cover 1,000 statute miles...The XCub is exhilarating to fly and aesthetically appealing inside and out. The clever layout of the panel, passenger seating, and stowage compartments show it was built by people who know their customers and the features they value."

In another June 2016 flight review of the CC19-180, Paul Bertorelli of AVweb said, "The XCub has aluminum rather than steel or the Cub’s traditional bungee gear. This was a revelation for me because aluminum does a nice job of absorbing surplus touchdown energy; it’s far less energetic than steel or those blasted bungees in returning misdirected touchdown energy. This results in a unique feeling on touchdown. If you know you’re a little fast and you know you’re going to bounce, it’s just a small one and not the sharp-edged twang of steel or the slingshot of the bungees, but rather a firm pushback with no lateral wiggles at all. It’s quite confidence inducing because those small bounces don’t require the massive control inputs to arrest that a really bad spring-steel bounce would."

At AirVenture in July 2016, the company announced that 20 CC19-180 XCubs had been sold.

In a July 2016 review, Flying magazine writer Pia Bergqvist generally praised the CC19-180, but found fault with the flap mechanism and resulting pitch changes with flap deployment. She wrote, "One thing that takes a bit of getting used to is the flap mechanism. Flaps are adjusted with a large handle in the upper left corner of the cockpit. The location of the handle makes it easy to access, and each flap setting is in a notch to prevent slippage. To get the first flap in position, you have to push slightly forward before grabbing the trigger to release the latch. For the second and third notches, however, you need to pull back before the handle will release. It took a few approaches to get used to the opposite action. The new slotted flap design allows for air from the underside of the wing to flow over the flap surface. With the additional lift, the pitch increases a great deal with each flap setting. [Company president Randy] Lervold advised me to fly with some nose-down trim before adding flaps. Without using that technique, retrimming was definitely required after each notch to prevent going too slow."

In a 2020 flight review of the tricycle landing gear-equipped CC19-180 NXCub model, KitPlanes magazine editor Marc Cook wrote, "truth is, for many pilots who came up in the period after 'real' Cubs made taildraggers the everyday airplane, the presence of a nosewheel on an airplane that’s as capable of off-pavement work as the NXCub will make the whole hard to resist. In fact, for many this is probably the backwoods airplane they’ve been waiting for all along."

== Variants ==
CC19-180 XCub
Certified, conventional landing gear model with 180 hp (134 kW) Lycoming O-360 powerplant
CC19-215 XCub
Certified, conventional landing gear model with 215 hp (160 kW) Lycoming IO-390 powerplant
CC19-215 NXCub
Certified, tricycle landing gear model with 215 hp (160 kW) Lycoming IO-390 powerplant
CCX-2300 Experimental NXCub
Experimental, tricycle landing gear model with 215 hp (160 kW) Lycoming IO-390 powerplant

== Specifications (XCub) ==
Data from Manufacturer and FAA

General characteristics

- Crew: one
- Capacity: one passenger
- Length: 23 ft 10 in (7.26 m)
- Wingspan: 34 ft 4 in (10.46 m)
- Height: 8 ft 4 in (2.54 m)
- Wing area: 174.8 sq ft (16.24 m^{2})
- Empty weight: 1,216 lb (552 kg)
- Gross weight: 2,300 lb (1,043 kg)
- Fuel capacity: 49 U.S. gallons (190 L; 41 imp gal)
- Powerplant: 1 × Lycoming O-360-C1 four cylinder, air-cooled, four stroke aircraft engine, 180 hp (130 kW)
- Propellers: 2-bladed Hartzell Propeller Trailblazer composite, constant speed propeller

Performance

- Maximum speed: 153 mph (246 km/h, 133 kn)
- Cruise speed: 145 mph (233 km/h, 126 kn)
- Stall speed: 39 mph (63 km/h, 34 kn)
- Never exceed speed: 167 mph (269 km/h, 145 kn)
- Range: 800 mi (1,300 km, 700 nmi)
- Endurance: 6 hours
- Service ceiling: 14,000 ft (4,300 m)
- Rate of climb: 1,500 ft/min (7.6 m/s)
