= CubCrafters CC18-180 Top Cub =

American light aircraft based on the Piper PA-18 Super Cub

CC18-180 Top Cub
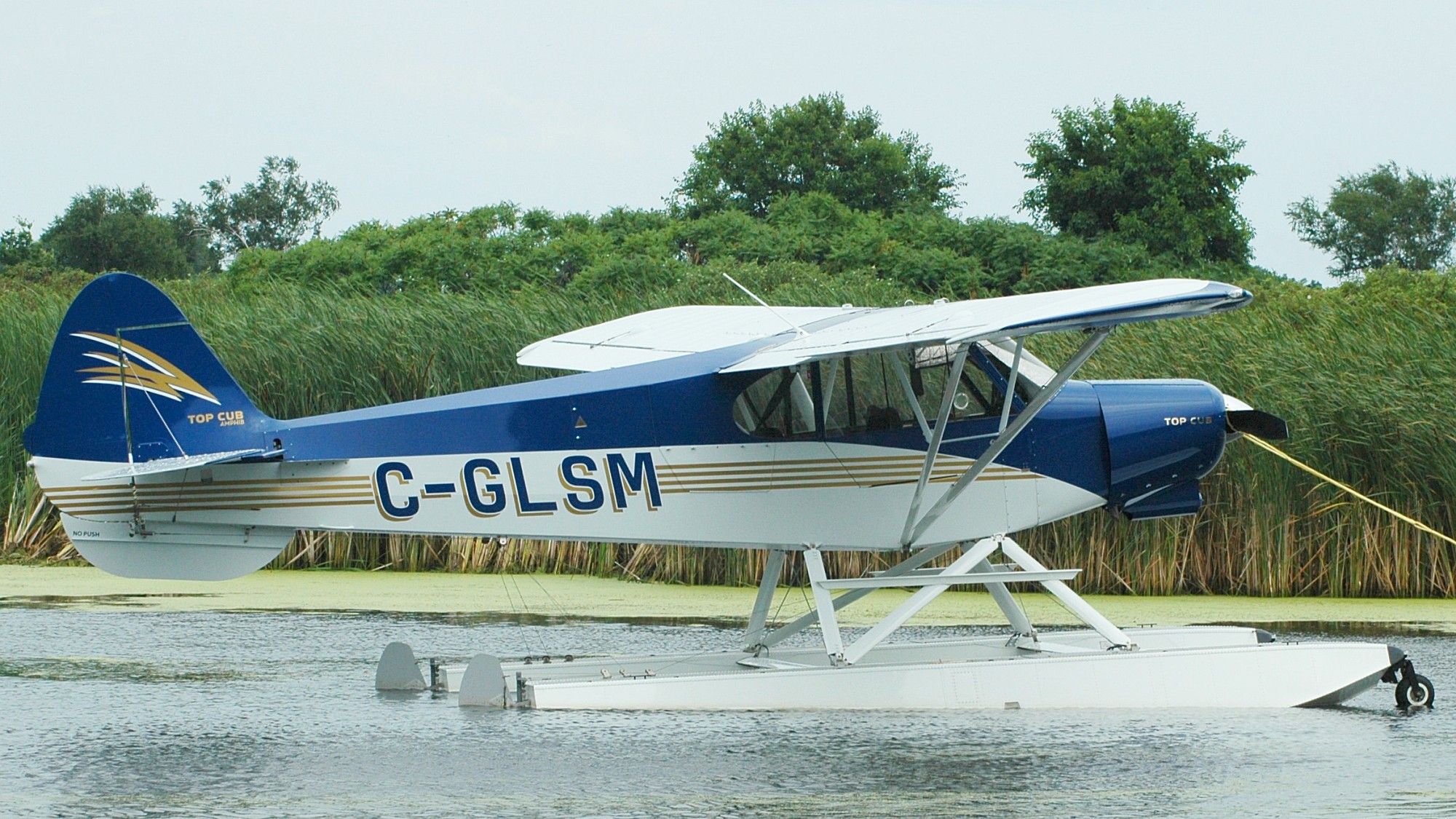

General information
- Type: Light aircraft
- National origin: United States
- Manufacturer: CubCrafters
- Status: In production (2017)

History
- Manufactured: 2004-present
- Introduction date: 2004
- Developed from: Piper PA-18 Super Cub

The CubCrafters CC18-180 Top Cub is an American light aircraft designed and produced by CubCrafters of Yakima, Washington, introduced in 2004. The aircraft is type certified and supplied complete and ready-to-fly.

The design is based on the 1949 vintage Piper PA-18 Super Cub.

== Design and development ==
The CC18-180 Top Cub was designed to comply with the FAR 23 certification rules. It features a strut-braced high-wing, an enclosed cockpit with two-seats-in-tandem accessed by doors, fixed conventional landing gear and a single engine in tractor configuration.

The aircraft is made from welded 4130 steel tubing, with its flying surfaces covered in doped aircraft fabric. Its 35.4 ft (10.8 m) span wing has an area of 178 sq ft (16.5 m^{2}) and mounts flaps. Standard engines available are the 180 hp (134 kW) Lycoming O-360-C4P or O-360-C1G and the 180 hp (134 kW) Superior O-360-A3A2 four-stroke powerplants.

The aircraft can be flown on wheels, tundra tires, skis or amphibious floats. Belly pods are available to increase cargo and fuel capacity.

The design was initially type certified by the US Federal Aviation Administration on 16 December 2004. The aircraft was certified by Transport Canada on 23 July 2008 and achieved Australian certification in August 2008.

In July 2015 CubCrafters sold the type certificate for the CC18 to the Liaoning Cub Aircraft Corporation of China. Cub Crafters then licensed the design back so they could produce the aircraft for the non-Chinese market. The type certificate was transferred to a holding company, Topcub Aircraft, Inc, on August 13, 2015. The Liaoning Cub Aircraft Corporation plans to produce the design in China for flight training, aerial photography, mapping, agriculture and personal use.

== Operational history ==
Reviewer Marino Boric described the design in a 2015 review saying, "the Top Cub is an ideal choice for any adventure-seeking pilot."

By February 2017, 74 examples had been registered in the United States with the Federal Aviation Administration and three with Transport Canada.

== Variants ==
CC18-180
Version type certified by the US FAA on 16 December 2004 for day and night, Visual Flight Rules (VFR).
CC18-180A
Version type certified by the US FAA on 1 July 2005 for day VFR. Only one built.

== Specifications (CC18-180 Top Cub) ==
Data from Tacke, manufacturer and FAA

General characteristics

- Crew: one
- Capacity: one passenger
- Length: 23 ft 6 in (7.16 m)
- Wingspan: 35 ft 3 in (10.74 m)
- Height: 8 ft 5 in (2.57 m)
- Wing area: 178 sq ft (16.5 m^{2})
- Empty weight: 1,200 lb (544 kg)
- Gross weight: 2,300 lb (1,043 kg)
- Fuel capacity: 50 U.S. gallons (190 L; 42 imp gal)
- Powerplant: 1 × Lycoming O-360-C4P four cylinder, air-cooled, four stroke aircraft engine, 180 hp (130 kW)
- Propellers: 2-bladed Sensenich Propeller, 6 ft 4 in (1.93 m) diameter

Performance

- Cruise speed: 127 mph (204 km/h, 110 kn)
- Stall speed: 48 mph (77 km/h, 42 kn) flaps down
- Never exceed speed: 152 mph (245 km/h, 132 kn)
- Range: 570 mi (920 km, 500 nmi)
- Endurance: 5 hours
- Service ceiling: 14,600 ft (4,500 m) with oxygen system installed
- Rate of climb: 800 ft/min (4.1 m/s)
