= Piper PA-11 Cub Special =

1940s American light aircraft

PA-11 Cub Special
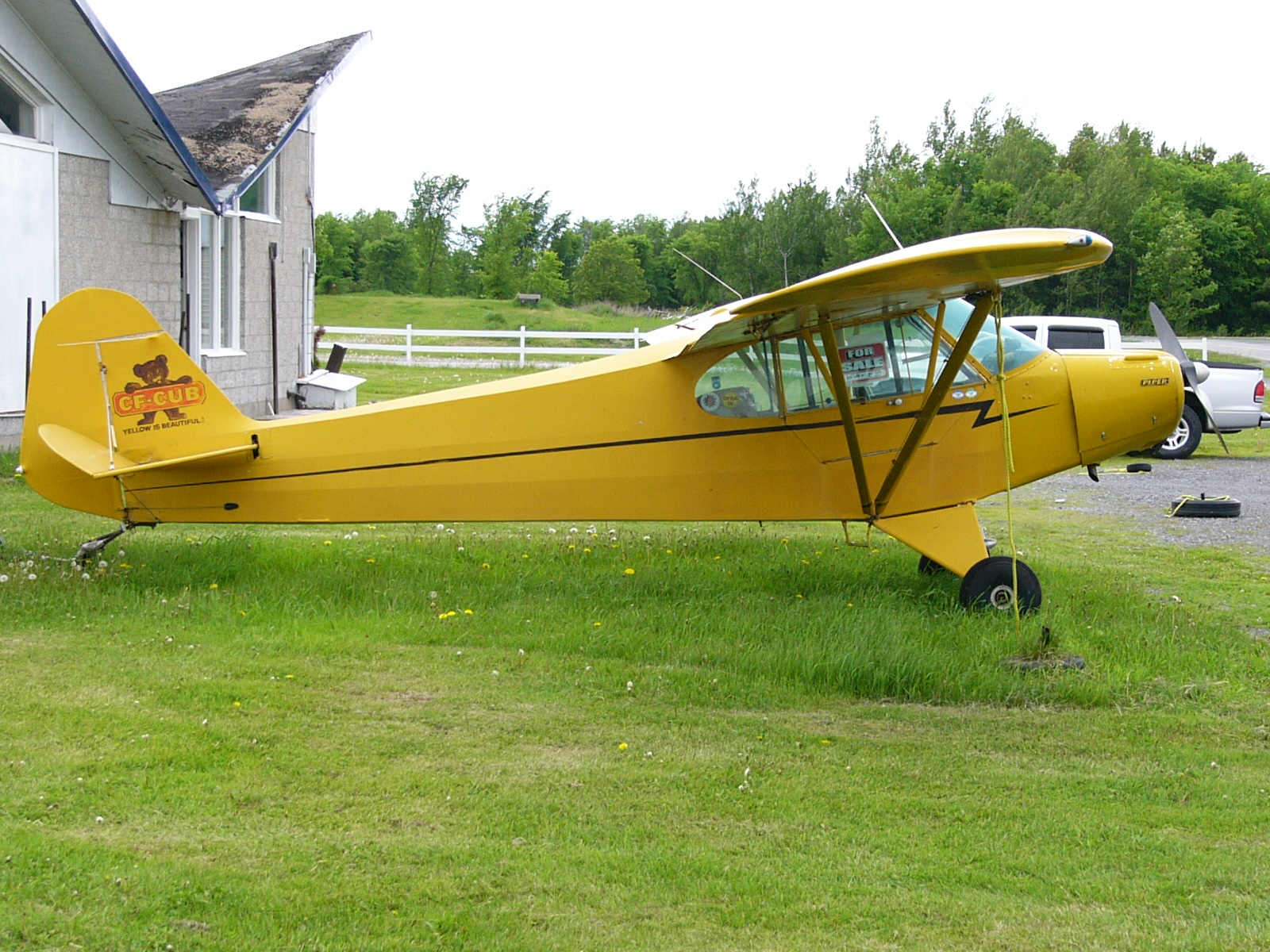

General information
- Type: Light aircraft
- National origin: United States
- Manufacturer: Piper Aircraft
- Status: Production completed
- Primary user: Private owners
- Number built: 1,541

History
- Manufactured: 1947-1949
- Introduction date: 1947
- First flight: August 1946
- Developed from: Piper J-3 Cub
- Variants: Piper PA-18 Super Cub

The Piper PA-11 Cub Special is a later-production variant of the J-3 Cub manufactured by Piper Aircraft.

== Design and development ==
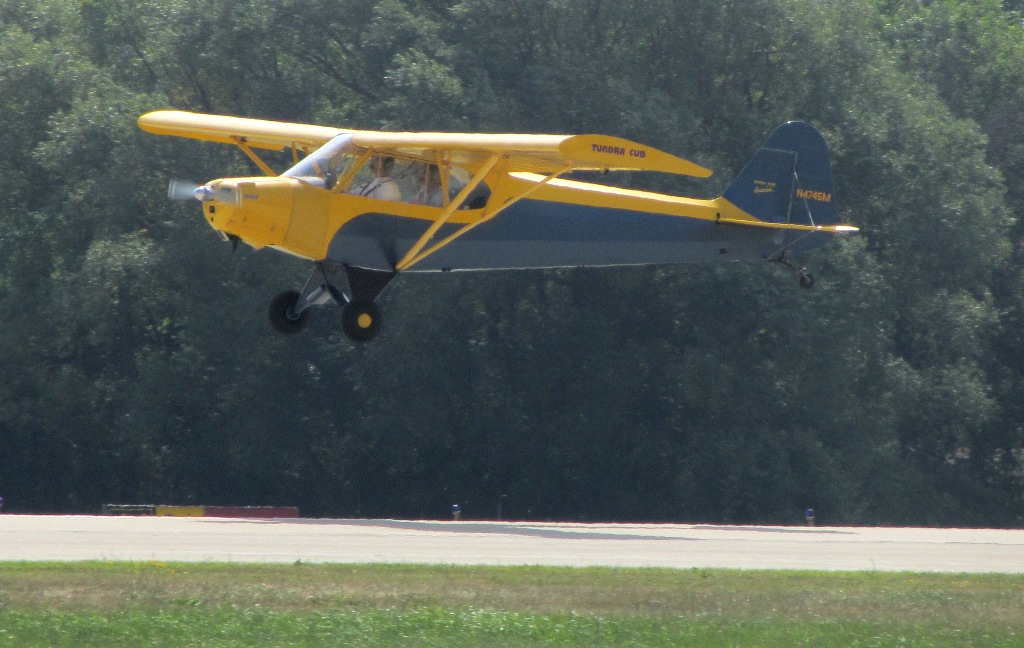
PA-11 landing

The PA-11 is a high-wing braced cabin monoplane with a tail-wheel landing gear. The enclosed cabin has two tandem seats. Early PA-11s had a Continental A65-8 engine, while the later ones had the option of a Continental C90-8.

The PA-11 was based on the earlier J-3, but with the engine cowling fully enclosed (as on the earlier J-5), the windshield sloped at a shallower angle, and the fuel tank placed in the port wing root. Both seats were slightly moved back, and solo flying was usually from the front seat.

The prototype and two subsequent pre-production models were built using a modified J-3 fuselage and wings. The prototype first flew in August 1946 followed by the two pre-production aircraft later in 1946.

The first production aircraft was completed at Lock Haven in March 1947 and production continued at Lock Haven until September 1949. A second production line was established at Ponca City between September 1947 and January 1948.

On the early PA-11s, the fuselage was painted with a metallic blue on the lower half the rest being Lock Haven Yellow. The later PA-11s were all yellow with a simple brown stripe.

The PA-11 also formed the basis for the next evolution in the Cub series, the PA-18 Super Cub, which shares many features.

=== Modifications ===
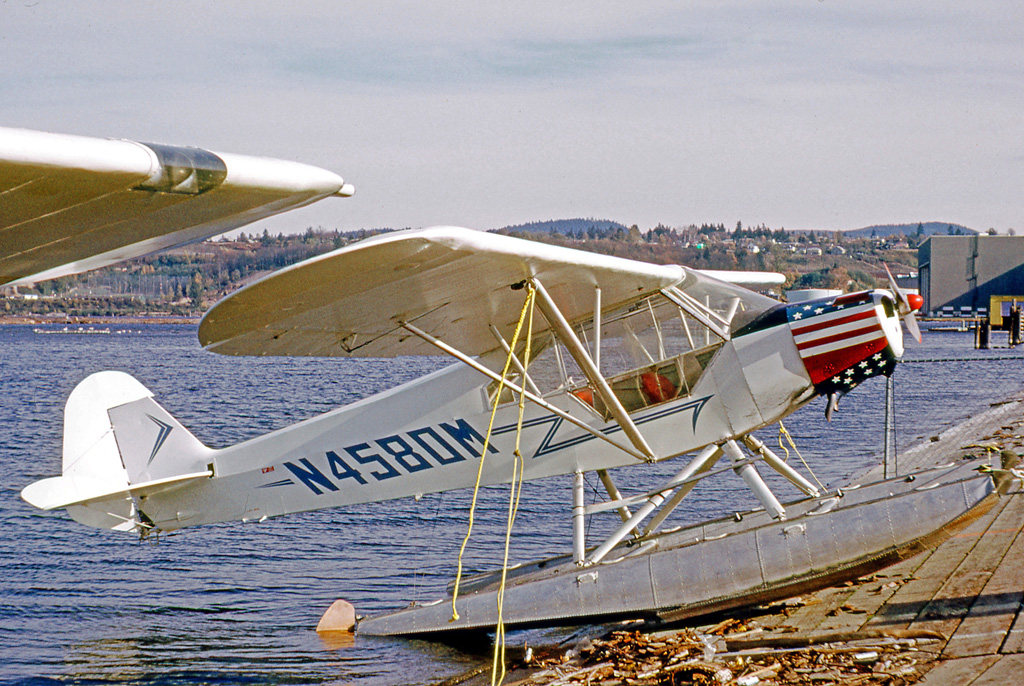
Float-equipped PA-11S at Seattle Renton in 1973

A small number of PA-11s have been modified to use a Tricycle landing gear.

The PA-11 was one of the first aircraft to be used by Piper for experiments with the nose wheel (also known as tricycle gear) configuration. Although its original design is intended to be a tail-dragger, a modification was created to mount a nose wheel.

The nose wheel is attached to the two rear engine mounts by y-shaped steel tubes attached to a steel tube with a shaft that slides freely with the wheel. Cables run underneath the belly directly from fixtures on the rudder pedals to the nose wheel shaft. This gave the ability to steer by pivoting the nose wheel shaft with the rudder pedals. The shock system consisted of six circular bungee cords, sometimes four for softer landings, located on either side of the nose wheel shaft to ears on the top tube and the bottom shaft connected to the wheel.

For the aircraft to balance properly with the nose wheel, the main gear was flipped around so that the center of balance would move forward. The pilot would sit in the front seat for added stability.

A number of Cub Specials have been converted for flight operation using floats.

== Variants ==
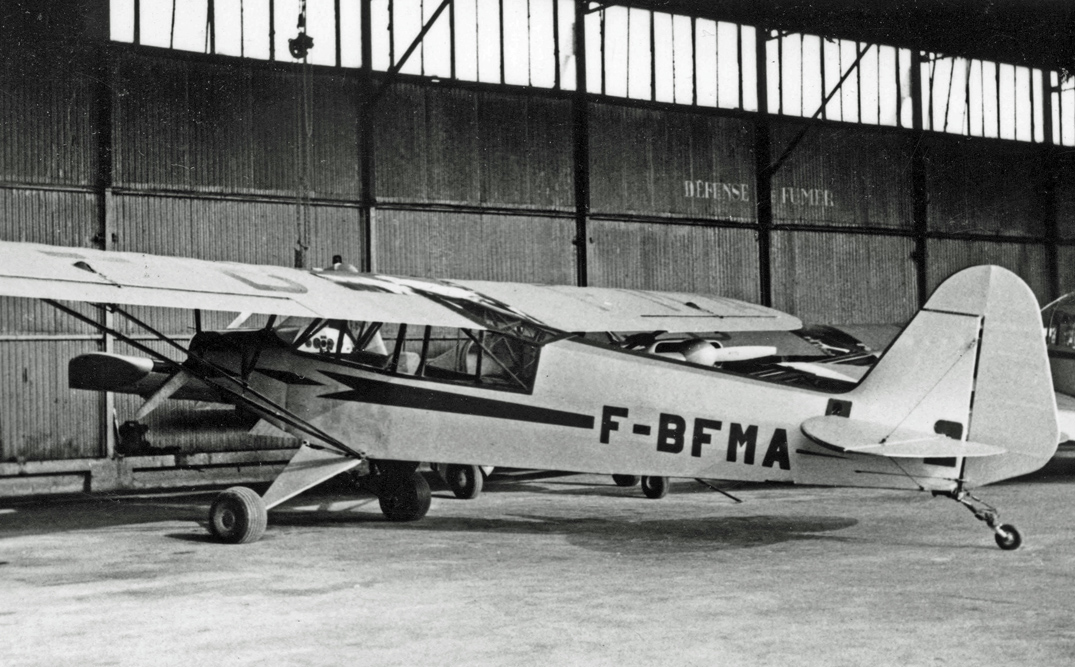
PA-11 Cub Special at Chelles airfield near Paris in June 1967

PA-11
Two-seat light aircraft, powered by either a 65 hp (48 kW) Continental A65-8 or a 95 hp (71 kW) Continental C90-8 piston engine.
PA-11S
Seaplane variant with twin EDO 1400 floats.
L-18B
United States Military designation of the PA-11 Cub Special, powered by a 95 hp (71 kW) Continental C90-8F piston engine, 105 built and delivered to Turkey, under the Military Assistance Program.
B.S.3A
(Thai: บ.ส.๓ก) Royal Thai Armed Forces designation for the PA-11.

== Operators ==
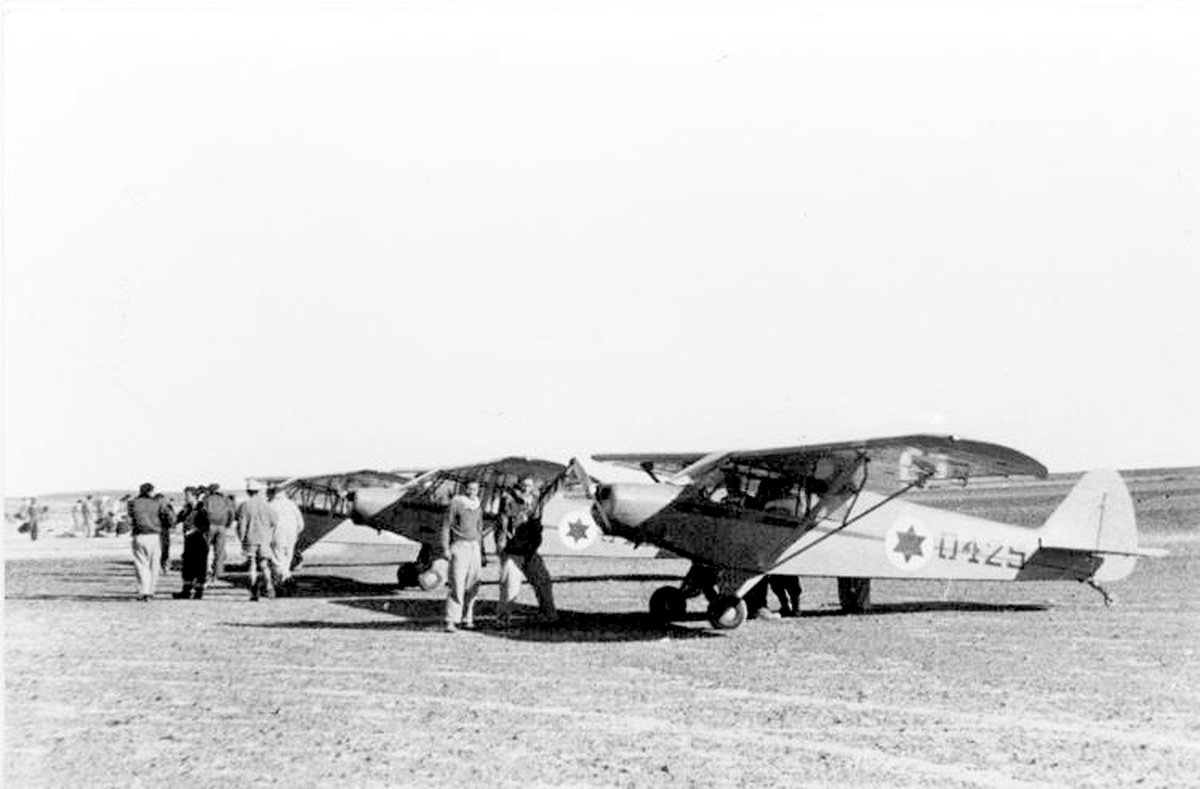
IAF Piper PA-11 Cub Special planes in the Negev in March 1949

=== Military operators ===
Israel

- Israeli Air Force

Turkey

== Specifications (PA-11 with 90 hp Continental engine) ==
Data from Piper Aircraft and Their Forerunners

General characteristics

- Crew: 1
- Capacity: 1 passenger and 470 lbs (213 kg) payload
- Length: 22 ft 4 in (6.8 m)
- Wingspan: 35 ft 2 in (10.7 m)
- Height: 6 ft 8 in (2.03 m)
- Wing area: 178.5 sq ft (16.58 m^{2})
- Empty weight: 750 lb (340 kg)
- Gross weight: 1,220 lb (553 kg)
- Fuel capacity: 12 US gal (10.0 imp gal; 45 L)
- Powerplant: × 1 Continental C90-8, 90 hp (67 kW)
- Propellers: 2-bladed Sensenich fixed-pitch wooden propeller, 6 ft 0 in (1.83 m) diameter

Performance

- Maximum speed: 112 mph (181 km/h, 97 kn)
- Cruise speed: 100 mph (162 km/h, 87 kn)
- Stall speed: 40 mph (65 km/h, 35 kn)
- Range: 350 mi (567 km, 300 nmi)
- Service ceiling: 16,000 ft (4,880 m)
