= CubCrafters CC11-100 Sport Cub S2 =

Sport Cub S2
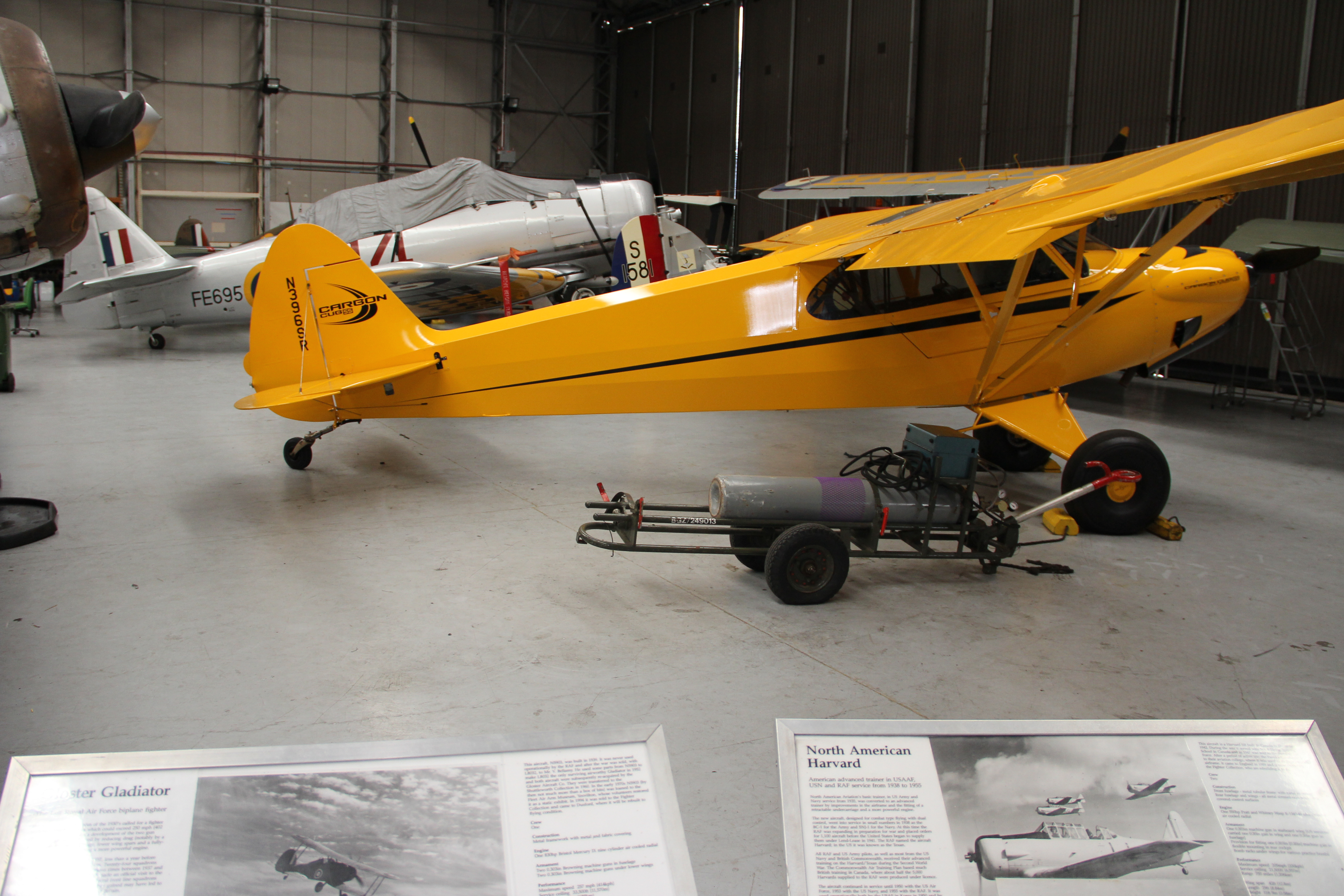

General information
- Type: Light sport aircraft
- National origin: United States
- Manufacturer: CubCrafters

History
- Introduction date: 2007
- Variant: CubCrafters Carbon Cub SS

The Cub Crafters CC11-100 Sport Cub S2 is a high-wing, tandem-seat, conventional landing gear–equipped, tube-and-fabric light-sport aircraft built by Cub Crafters. The aircraft certified to ATSM standards for the FAA's Light Sport Category and was in production as of 2010. The S2 was introduced in 2007 as an improvement to the Sport Cub of 2005.

== Design and development ==
Cub Crafters started business as a heavy maintenance and overhaul shop for classic Piper aircraft. In 1998, Cub Crafters started production of all-new aircraft leading to the Sport Cub built to meet the FAA's Light Sport requirements.

The aircraft follows the same basic design and shape as the Piper Cub. Notable exceptions are a 100 hp (75 kW) fully cowled Teledyne Continental engine, an electrical system and a modified USA 35b airfoil from the SuperCub.

== Operational history ==
In 2007, Scott Carson, CEO of Boeing, purchased an S2 for his own personal use.

== Variants ==
CC11-100 Sport Cub
Base model.
Super Sport Cub
Uses engine components from a Lycoming O-340 engine capable of 180 hp (134 kW), and derated to 80 hp (60 kW).

== Specifications (CC11-100 Sport Cub S2) ==
Data from Cub Crafters

General characteristics

- Capacity: 2
- Length: 23 ft 3 in (7.09 m)
- Wingspan: 34 ft 2 in (10.41 m)
- Height: 8 ft 4 in (2.54 m)
- Wing area: 179 sq ft (16.6 m^{2})
- Airfoil: Modified USA 35(B)
- Empty weight: 832 lb (377 kg)
- Gross weight: 1,320 lb (599 kg)
- Fuel capacity: 25 US gallons (95 litres)
- Powerplant: 1 × Continental O-200 , 100 hp (75 kW)

Performance

- Cruise speed: 88 kn (101 mph, 163 km/h)
- Stall speed: 28 kn (32 mph, 51 km/h)
- Never exceed speed: 123 kn (141 mph, 227 km/h)
- Range: 390 nmi (450 mi, 720 km)
- Endurance: 5 hr
- Rate of climb: 790 ft/min (4.0 m/s)
- Wing loading: 7.4 lb/sq ft (36 kg/m^{2})

== See also ==
Related development

- Piper Cub

Aircraft of comparable role, configuration, and era

- Wag-Aero CUBy
