= Piper PA-18 Super Cub =

1940s American light aircraft

PA-18 Super Cub
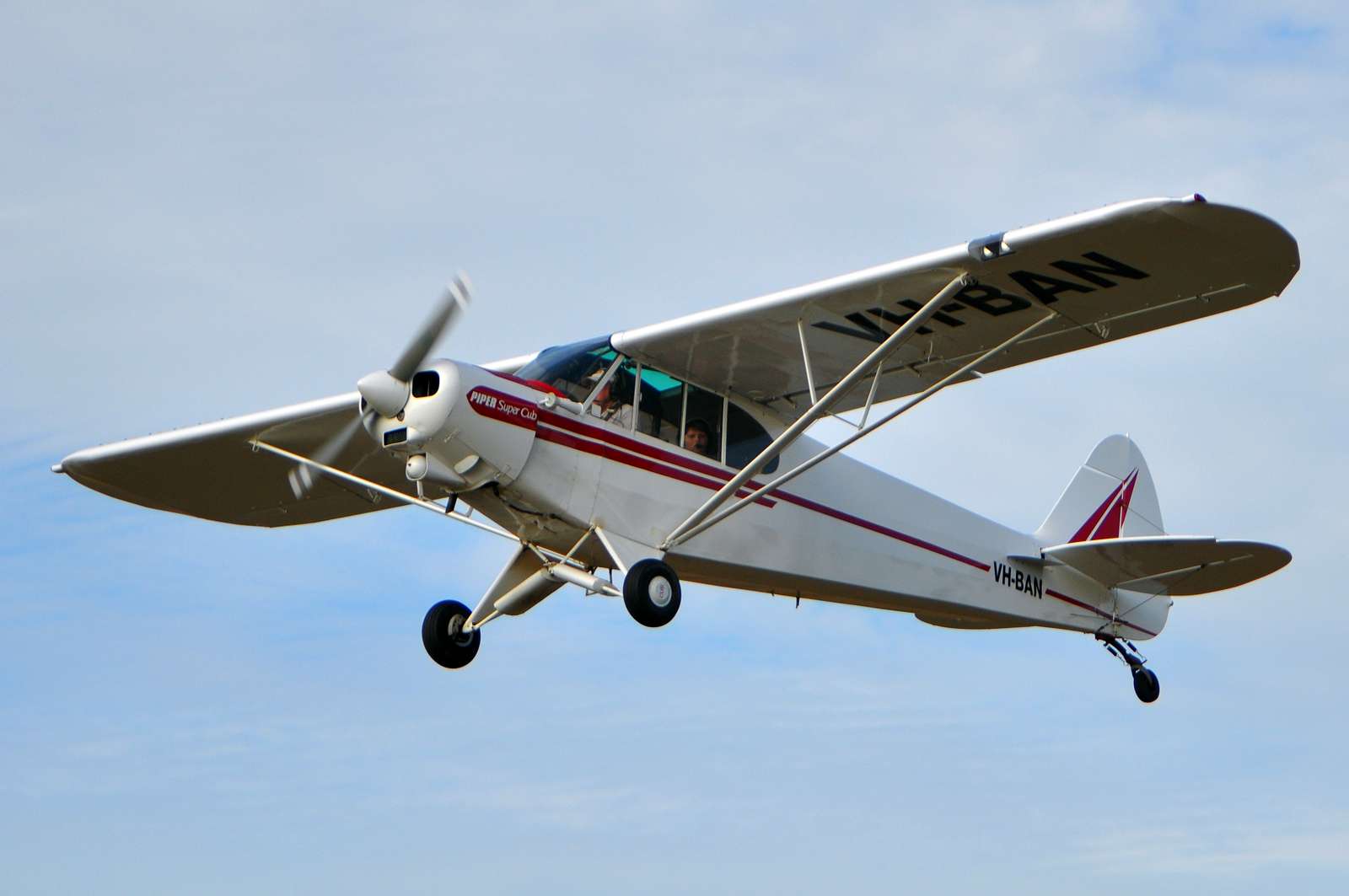
- PA-18-150 over Watts Bridge Airfield

General information
- Type: Light utility aircraft
- National origin: United States
- Manufacturer: Piper Aircraft
- Number built: 10,326

History
- Manufactured: 1949–1983; 1988–1994
- Introduction date: 1949
- First flight: 1949
- Developed from: Piper PA-11 Cub Special

The Piper PA-18 Super Cub is a two-seat, single-engine monoplane. Introduced in 1949 by Piper Aircraft, it was developed from the PA-11 Cub Special, and traces its lineage back through the J-3 Cub to the Taylor E-2 Cub of the 1930s. In close to 40 years of production, over 10,000 were built. Super Cubs are commonly found in roles such as bush flying, banner towing and glider towing.

== Design and development ==
While based on the design of the earlier Cubs, the addition of an electrical system, flaps (3 notches), and a considerably more powerful engine (150 hp), made it a very different flying experience. Although the "standard" Super Cub was fitted with a 150-horsepower (112 kW) Lycoming engine, it is not uncommon to see them equipped with a 160-horsepower O-320-B2B, or even 180 horsepower (134 kW) Lycoming O-360 powerplant. The high-lift wing and powerful engine made the Super Cub a prime candidate for conversion to either floatplane or skiplane. In addition, the PA-18A (an agricultural version) was produced for applying either dry chemical or liquid spray.

The Super Cub retained the basic "rag and tube" (fabric stretched over a steel tube frame) structure of the earlier J-3 Cub.

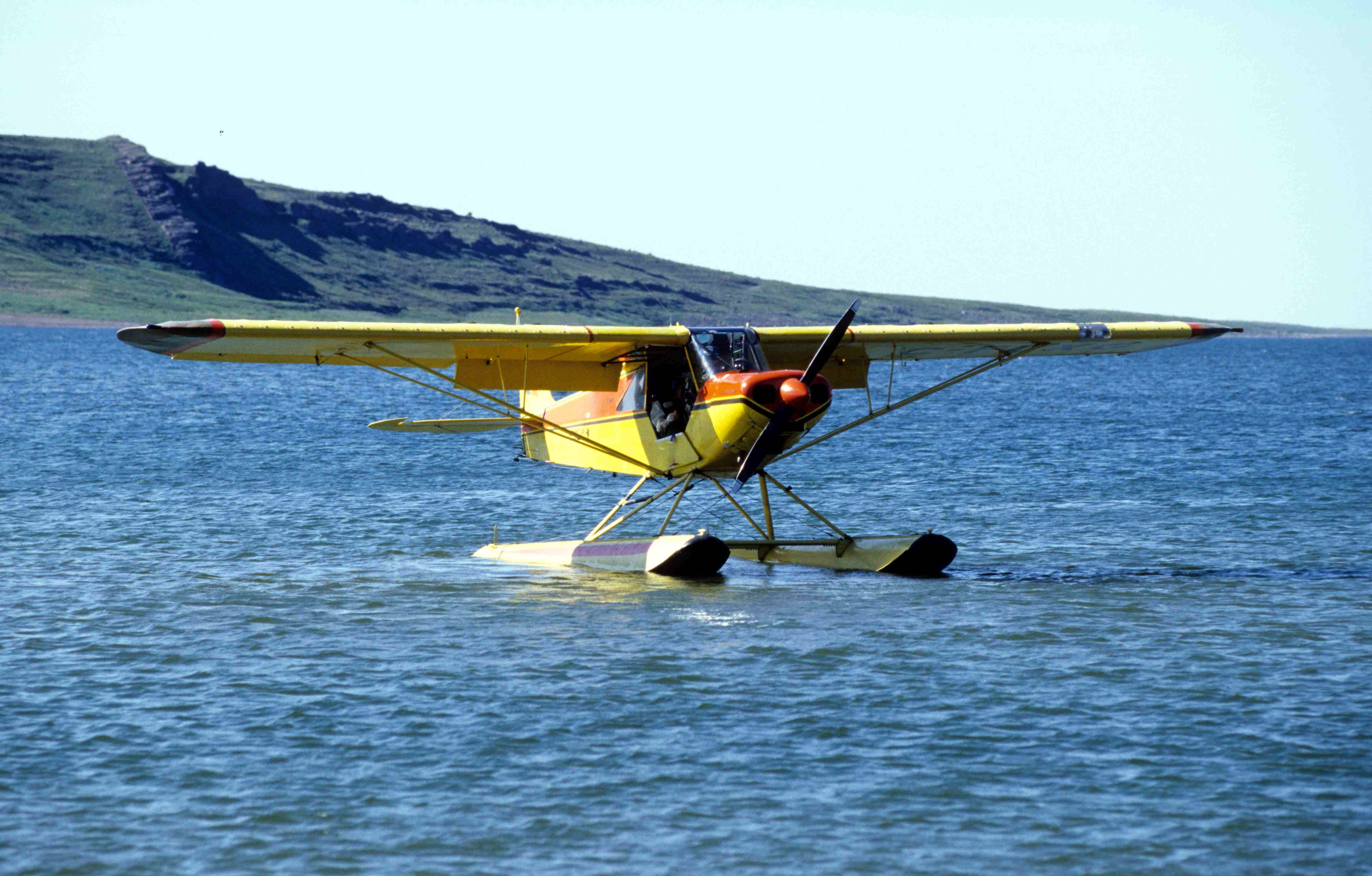
Piper PA-18-150 Super Cub floatplane

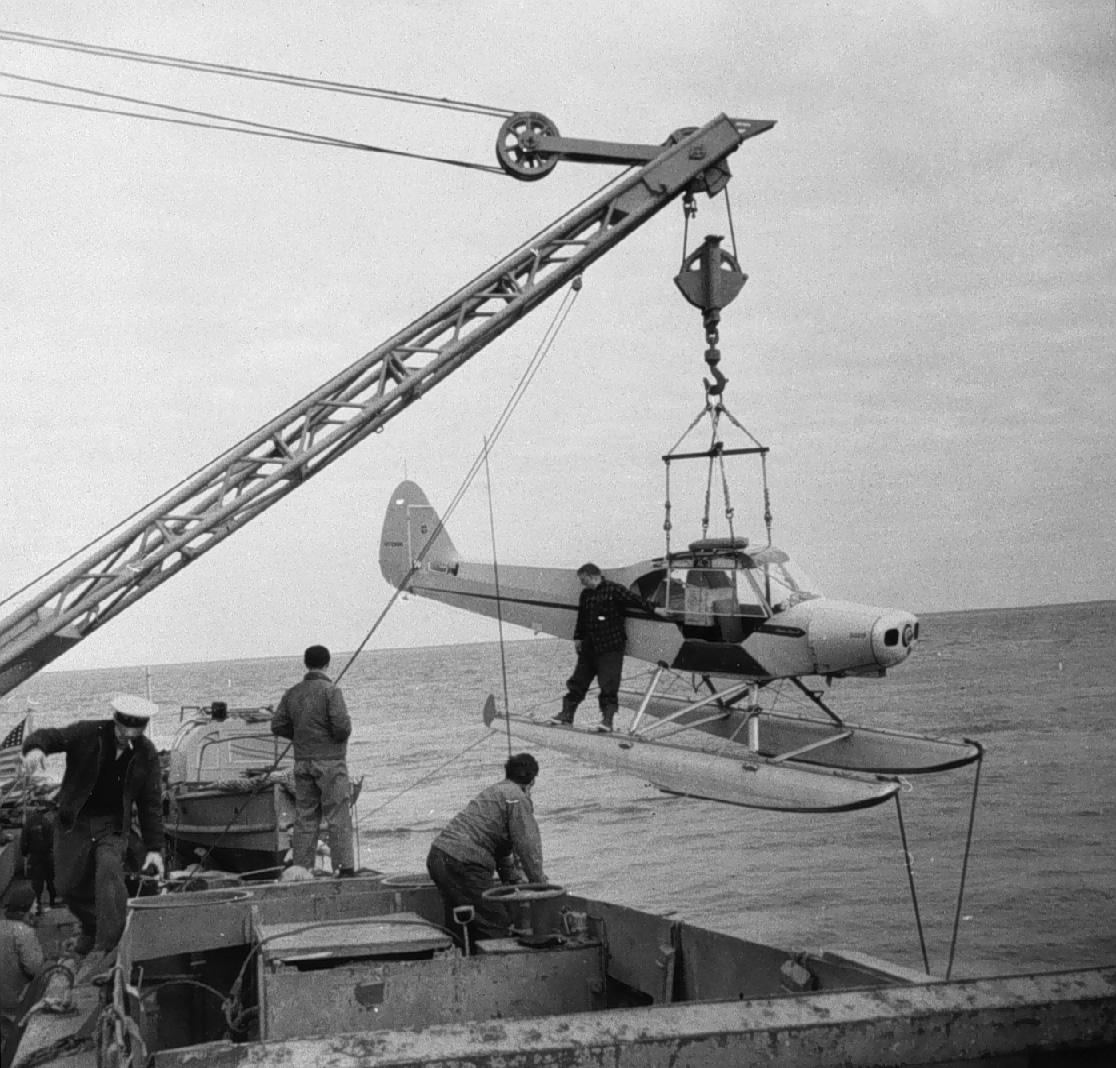
Piper Cub used for weather monitoring and instrument maintenance in Alaska in 1950

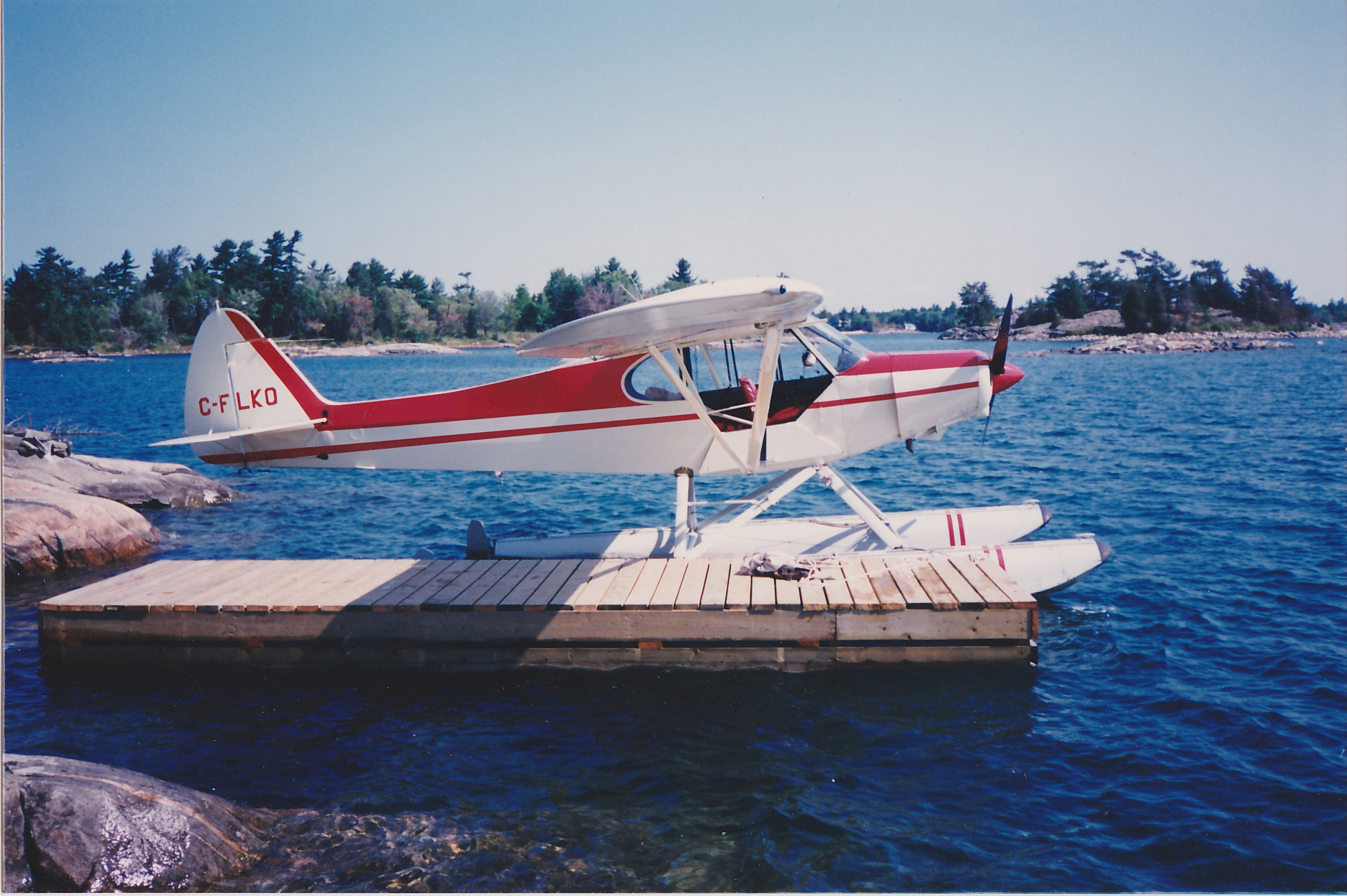
Super Cub PA-18-150 on floats

The first true "Super" Cubs had flaps, dual fuel tanks, and an O-235 Lycoming engine producing about 108 hp (115 hp for takeoff only). However, a 90 hp Continental variant without flaps and without the optional second wing tank was available. Their empty weight was, on the average, 800–1000 pounds with a gross weight of 1,500 lb. These Cubs would take off in about 400 feet (at gross weight) and land in about 300 feet using flaps. The Super Cub is renowned for its ability to take off and land in very short distances. The first Super Cubs were going to be offered with a unique four-wheel tandem main landing gear designed for landing and takeoff from rough terrain, but this was replaced with conventional landing gear. The O-290 Lycoming powered Cubs (135 hp) followed and would take off in about 200 feet (61 m). The landing distance remained the same at about 400 feet (120 m), or 300 feet (91 m) using flaps. With the use of the Lycoming O-320 at 150–160 hp, the Cub's allowable gross weight increased to 1,750 lb while retaining the capability of a mere 200 feet (61 m) required for takeoff.

The PA-18 has developed a very dedicated following in the bush-flying community, and many modifications have been developed for it, to the point where it is quite rare to find an original, completely stock Super Cub. Modifications include extended baggage compartments (reaching farther back into the fuselage, or even two-level baggage compartments in the top and bottom of the rear fuselage), external luggage pods, fuel pods, lumber racks for carrying construction materials into unimproved bush runways. Also the removal of header tanks, larger 24 or even 30 gallon wing fuel tanks, extended main landing gear for better ground clearance of the propeller, strengthened tailwheel springs, the addition of a small third passenger seat in the luggage area and lightweight generators and starters. Also various different mount areas for the battery (to move the weight forward, and reduce tail weight to shorten takeoff distance), various vertical stabilizer shapes to increase surface area, lengthened flaps, various wingtip designs, vortex generators on the leading edge of the wings, movement of the electrical panel from the right wing root to the dashboard to reduce fire hazard during a crash, and even the addition of a constant-speed propeller. Above all, the most common modification is the addition of "bush wheels" (themselves said to be direct descendants of Alvin Musselman's 1920s-origin "airwheel" tires used on the original Piper J-3), large, soft, low pressure balloon-tires designed to absorb impacts from rocks and boulders, and to not sink into sand or other soft surfaces, ideal for off-runway landings.

== Variants ==
PA-18 Super Cub

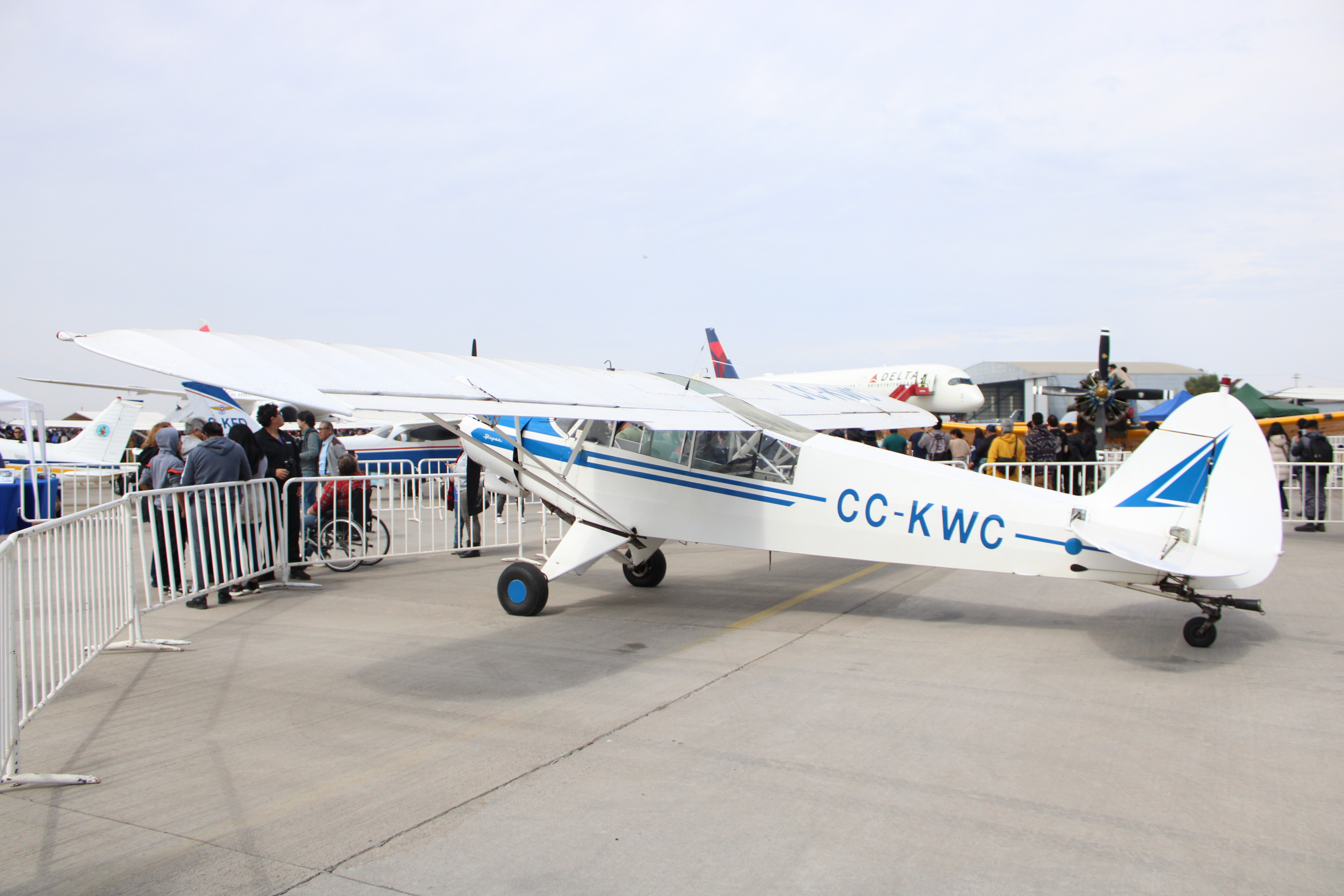
A parked Super Cub

Prototype and production variant powered by a 95 hp Continental C-90-8F piston engine, sometimes known as the PA-18-95.
PA-18-105 Super Cub
Production variant fitted with a 105 hp Lycoming O-235-C1 piston engine and larger tailplane.
PA-18-105 Special
Special variant built in 1952 and 1953 for the Civil Air Patrol as a trainer with horn-balanced elevators and provision for seat parachutes.
PA-18-125 Super Cub
Variant to replace the PA-18-95 with flaps and horn-balanced elevators and a 125 hp Lycoming O-290-D piston engine and either wood or metal controllable-pitch propeller.
PA-18-135 Super Cub
Variant with a 135 hp Lycoming O-290-D piston engine and fitted with two wing tanks as standard.

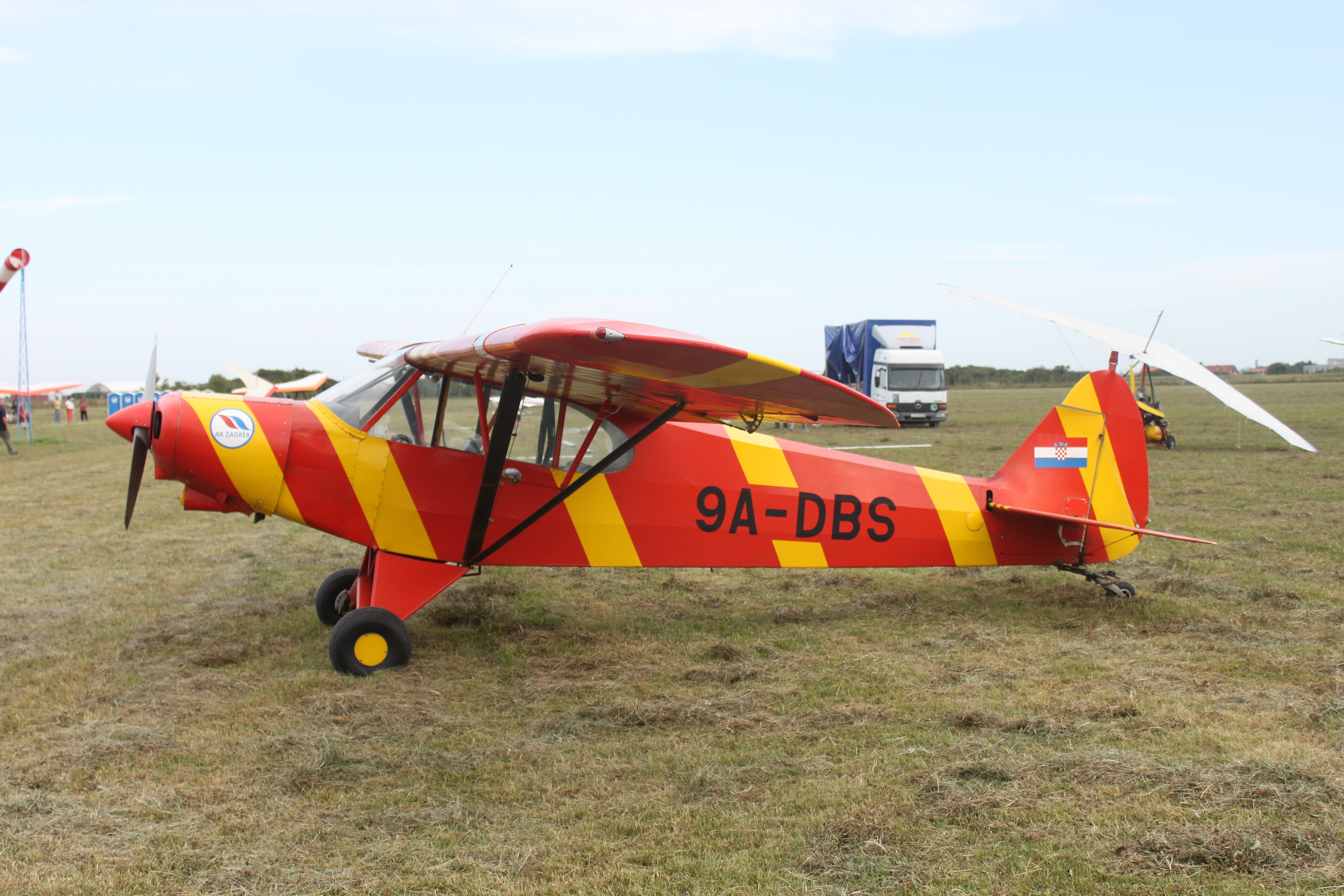
PA-18-150

PA-18-150 Super Cub
1954 variant with a 150 hp Lycoming O-320.
PA-18-180 Super Cub
Experimental variant with a 180 hp Lycoming O-360 engine, one built in 1980 by Piper. Other aircraft have been re-engined under a Supplemental Type Certificate.
PA-18A
Designation for production agricultural aircraft, including cropdusters and sprayer variants and incorporating a slightly different rear fuselage profile to allow fitting of a hopper-tank in the rear seat position.
PA-18S
Designation for production aircraft fitted with floats.
PA-18AS
Designation of a small number of agricultural aircraft fitted with floats.
PA-19 Super Cub
Original designation of the military variant of the PA-18, only three built and all subsequent military production were designated as PA-18s.
Aeromod Loadstar Model 100
Biplane conversion of Super Cub, powered by 135 hp (101 kW) O-290-D engine, designed for improved capability from high-altitude airfields.
SAFAT 01
A Sudanese development / copy built by the SAFAT Aviation Complex at Khartoum.

=== Military designations ===
L-18C Super Cub
Military designation of the PA-18 Super Cub for the United States Army, powered by a 95 hp (71 kW) Continental C90-8F piston engine, 838 delivered, at least 156 of which were delivered to other nations under MDAP.
YL-21 Super Cub
Two Super Cub 135s for evaluation by the United States Army.
L-21A Super Cub
Military designation of the Super Cub 125, powered by a 125 hp (92 kW) Avco Lycoming 0-290-II piston engine, 150 delivered.
L-21B Super Cub
Military designation of the Super Cub 135, powered by a 135 hp (101 kW) Avco Lycoming 0-290-D2 piston engine, 584 delivered many to other nations under MDAP, re-designated U-7A in 1962.
TL-21A
A number of L-21As were converted into training aircraft.
U-7A Super Cub
1962 redesignation of the L-21B.

== Operators ==
=== Military operators ===
Argentina

- Argentine Air Force
- Argentine National Gendarmerie

Austria

- Austrian Air Force

Belgium

- Belgian Army

Cyprus

- Cyprus Air Command

Germany

- Federal German Luftwaffe

Greece

- Greek Army

Iran

- Imperial Iranian Air Force

Italy

- Italian Army

Israel

- Israeli Air Force

Japan

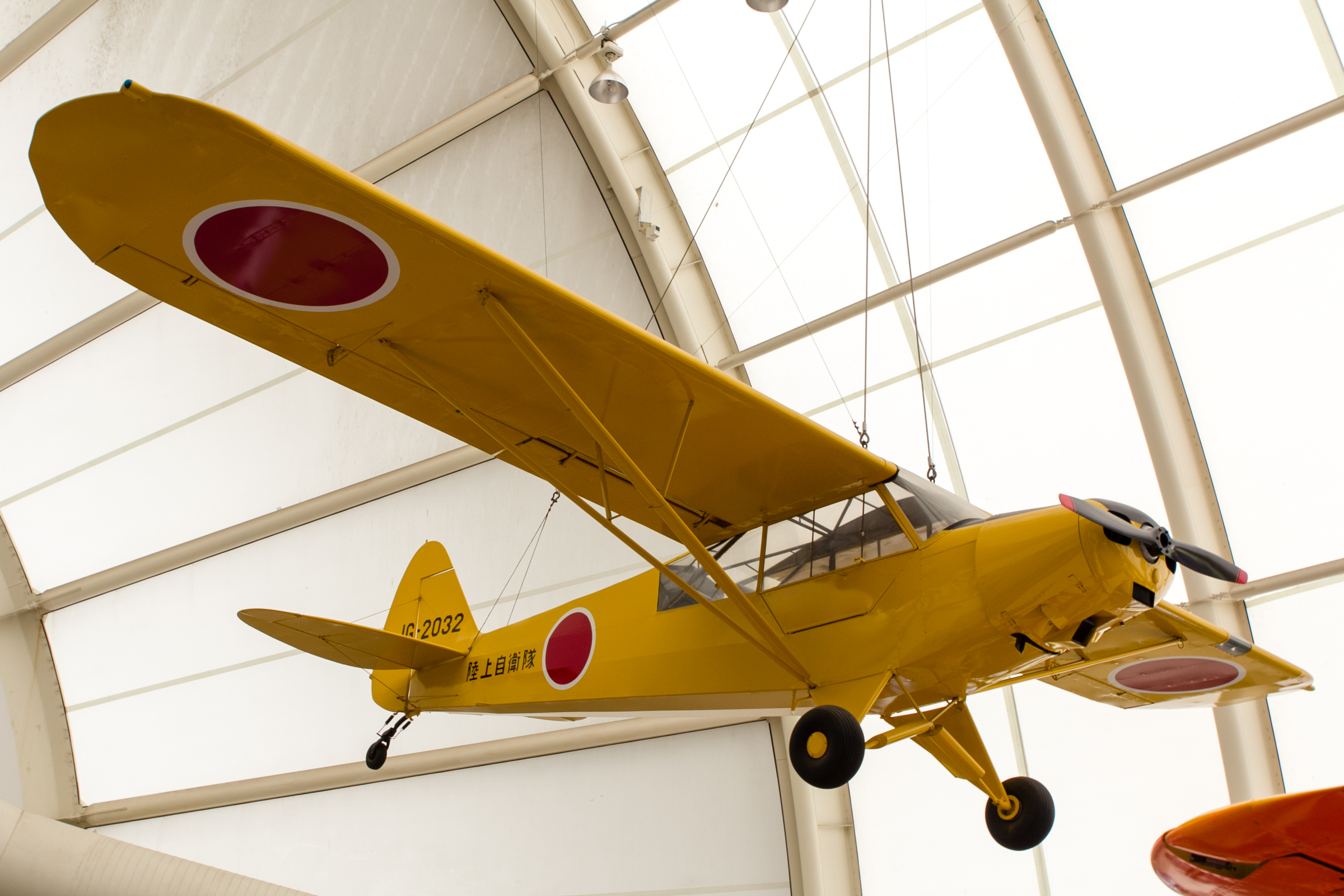
Japan Ground Self-Defense Force L-21B

- Japan Ground Self-Defense Force

Luxembourg

- Luxembourg Air Wing: 3 Piper PA-18 Super Cub from 1952 to 1968.

Katanga

- Force Aérienne Katangaise

Netherlands

- Netherlands Air Force

Nicaragua

- Nicaraguan Air Force

Norway

- Royal Norwegian Air Force

Portugal

- Portuguese Army
- Portuguese Air Force

Sweden

- Swedish Army

Switzerland

- Swiss Air Force
  - 4 PA-18-150 served with the Swiss Airforce, as V-653 to V-656, from 1964 to 1975. V654 became HB-PAV, V655 HB-PAW, V656 HB-PAX.

Turkey

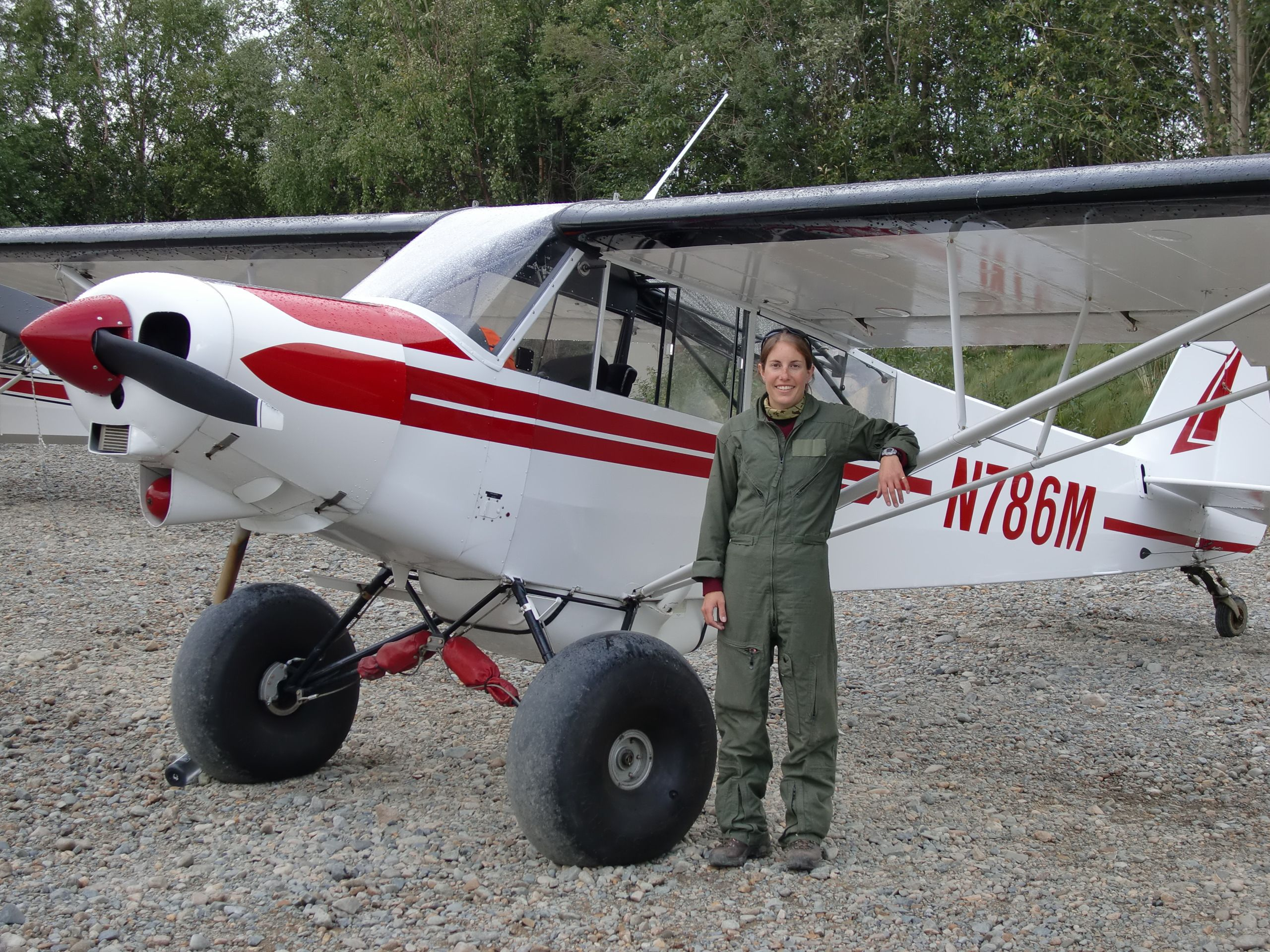
USFWS Super Cub, used for law enforcement in Alaska. 1970 Piper PA-18-150 Super Cub C/N 18-8898

- Turkish Army

Uganda
Uruguay

- Uruguayan Navy

United States

- United States Air Force
- United States Army

=== Civilian Users ===
United States

- Alaska State Troopers
- U.S. Fish and Wildlife Service, Alaska
- U.S. Border Patrol Southwest Border

== Specifications (PA-18-150 landplane) ==
3-view line drawing of the Piper PA-18 Super Cub

Data from Jane's All The World's Aircraft 1976-77

General characteristics

- Crew: 1
- Capacity: 1 passenger
- Length: 22 ft 7 in (6.88 m)
- Wingspan: 35 ft 2 1/2 in (10.732 m)
- Height: 6 ft 8 1/2 in (2.045 m)
- Wing area: 178.5 sq ft (16.58 m^{2})
- Aspect ratio: 7:1
- Airfoil: USA 35B MOD
- Empty weight: 930 lb (422 kg)
- Max takeoff weight: 1,750 lb (794 kg)
- Fuel capacity: 36 US gal (30 imp gal; 140 L)
- Powerplant: 1 × Lycoming O-320 air-cooled flat four engine, 150 hp (110 kW)

Performance

- Maximum speed: 130 mph (209 km/h, 113 kn)
- Cruise speed: 115 mph (185 km/h, 100 kn) (75% power)
- Stall speed: 43 mph (69 km/h, 37 kn) (flaps down)
- Never exceed speed: 153 mph (246 km/h, 133 kn)
- Range: 460 mi (740 km, 400 nmi)
- Service ceiling: 19,000 ft (5,800 m)
- Rate of climb: 960 ft/min (4.9 m/s)
- Takeoff distance to 50 ft (15 m): 500 ft (152 m)
- Landing distance from 50 ft (15 m): 725 ft (221 m)

== See also ==
Related development

- Piper J-3 Cub
- Piper PA-11 Cub Special
- Taylor Cub

Aircraft of comparable role, configuration, and era

- Aero Boero AB-95
- American Champion Scout
- Aviat Husky
- CubCrafters CC11-160 Carbon Cub SS - 180hp Light Sport
- CubCrafters CC18-180 Top Cub - certified modern version
- Light Miniature Aircraft LM-5 - copy of the PA-18
- Super 18 Model S18-180

== Bibliography ==
- John Andrade, U.S. Military Aircraft Designations and Serials since 1909, Midland Counties Publications, 1979, ISBN 0-904597-22-9
- Peperell, Roger W. and Colin M. Smith. Piper Aircraft and their forerunners. Tonbridge, Kent, England:Air-Britain, 1987, ISBN 0-85130-149-5
- Steinemann, Peter. "Protector of the Plate". Air International, Vol. 42, No. 2, February 1992. pp. 73–78. ISSN 0306-5634.
- Taylor, John W. R. Jane's All The World's Aircraft 1967–68. London: Sampson Low, Marston & Company, 1967.
- Taylor, John W.R. Jane's All The World's Aircraft 1976-77. London: Jane's Yearbooks, 1976, ISBN 0-354-00538-3.
- Wheeler, Barry C. "World Air Forces 1974". Flight International, Vol. 106, No. 3414. August 15, 1974. pp. 167–190.
