= Pagotto =

Pagotto is an Italian surname. Notable people with the surname include:

- Angelo Pagotto (born 1973), Italian football goalkeeper
- Antonio Pagotto, or Toni Pagot (1921–2001), Italian comics artist and animator
- Mario Pagotto (1911–1992), Italian football defender

== See also ==
- Carpenterie Pagotto, Italian aircraft manufacturer
  - Pagotto Brakogyro, a series of Italian autogyros
  - Pagotto Brako, an Italian ultralight trike
