= Celier XeWing =

Polish ultralight aircraft

XeWing

General information
- Type: Ultralight aircraft
- National origin: Poland
- Manufacturer: Celier Aviation
- Designer: Raphael Celier
- Status: Prototype only

History
- Introduction date: 2009
- Developed from: Celier Xenon 2

The Celier XeWing (contraction of Xenon Wing) is a Polish ultralight aircraft that was designed by Frenchman Raphael Celier and produced by his company Celier Aviation of Jaktorów-Kolonia, Poland. It was introduced at AERO Friedrichshafen in 2009. The aircraft was intended to be supplied as a kit for amateur construction or as a complete ready-to-fly-aircraft.

By 2012 the company was no longer advertising the XeWing and it is unlikely that it progressed beyond the prototype stage.

== Design and development ==
The XeWing was developed by mating the fuselage from the Celier Xenon 2 gyroplane with a newly designed strut-braced parasol wing in place of the rotor system. The aircraft was intended to comply with the Fédération Aéronautique Internationale microlight rules. It features a two-seats-in-side-by-side configuration enclosed cockpit, fixed tricycle landing gear and a single engine in pusher configuration.

The aircraft wing is made from aluminum sheet, has a span of 6.6 m (21.7 ft) and an area of 10 m^{2} (110 sq ft). The wing can be folded for ground transportation and storage. The standard engine specified was the 100 hp (75 kW) Rotax 912ULS four-stroke powerplant.

Despite the commonality of the fuselage and engine package with the Xenon 2, the XeWing cannot swap its fixed wing for a rotor system.

== Specifications (XeWing) ==
Data from Bayerl

General characteristics

- Crew: one
- Capacity: one passenger
- Wingspan: 6.6 m (21 ft 8 in)
- Wing area: 10 m^{2} (110 sq ft)
- Empty weight: 300 kg (661 lb)
- Gross weight: 472.5 kg (1,042 lb)
- Fuel capacity: 85 litres (19 imp gal; 22 US gal)
- Powerplant: 1 × Rotax 912ULS four cylinder, liquid and air-cooled, four stroke aircraft engine, 75 kW (101 hp)

Performance

- Cruise speed: 150 km/h (93 mph, 81 kn)
- Stall speed: 70 km/h (43 mph, 38 kn)
