= Celier Kiss =

Polish autogyro

Kiss

General information
- Type: Autogyro
- National origin: Poland
- Manufacturer: Celier Aviation
- Designer: Raphael Celier
- Status: Production completed

The Celier Kiss is a series of Polish autogyros that was designed by Frenchman Raphael Celier and produced by his company, Celier Aviation of Jaktorów-Kolonia, Poland. When it was available the aircraft was supplied as a kit for amateur construction or as a complete ready-to-fly-aircraft.

== Design and development ==
The tandem seat Kiss series was designed as a complement to the side-by-side configuration Celier Xenon 2 series of autogyros. The Kiss series all feature a single main rotor, tricycle landing gear, a low-set T-tail and a choice of engines, all mounted in pusher configuration.

== Variants ==
Kiss 582
A proposed single seat variant under development in 2011. It will be powered by the twin cylinder, liquid-cooled, two-stroke, dual-ignition 64 hp (48 kW) Rotax 582 engine. The cockpit will be either partially or, optionally, fully enclosed.
Kiss 912
Base model, with two seats in tandem, powered by a four cylinder, air and liquid-cooled, four-stroke, dual-ignition 80 hp (60 kW) Rotax 912UL engine in pusher configuration. The cockpit has a semi-enclosed fairing with a windshield.
Kiss 912S
Upgraded model, with two seats in tandem, powered by a four cylinder, air and liquid-cooled, four-stroke, dual-ignition 100 hp (75 kW) Rotax 912ULS engine in pusher configuration. The cockpit has a fully enclosed fairing.
Kiss 914
Turbocharged model, with two seats in tandem, powered by a four cylinder, air and liquid-cooled, four-stroke, dual-ignition 115 hp (86 kW) Rotax 914 engine in pusher configuration. The cockpit has a fully enclosed fairing.

== Specifications (912) ==
Data from Bayerl

General characteristics

- Crew: one
- Capacity: one passenger
- Empty weight: 200 kg (441 lb)
- Gross weight: 450 kg (992 lb)
- Fuel capacity: 50 litres (11 imp gal; 13 US gal)
- Powerplant: 1 × Rotax 912UL four cylinder, liquid and air-cooled, four stroke aircraft engine, 60 kW (80 hp)
- Main rotor diameter: 8.4 m (27 ft 7 in)
- Main rotor area: 55.4 m^{2} (596 sq ft)

Performance

- Maximum speed: 140 km/h (87 mph, 76 kn)
- Endurance: 3 hours
- Rate of climb: 3 m/s (590 ft/min)
- Disk loading: 8.1 kg/m^{2} (1.7 lb/sq ft)
