= Eurodisplay SR-01 Magic =

Sailboat class

General information
- Type: Ultralight aircraft and Light-sport aircraft
- National origin: Czech Republic
- Manufacturer: Eurodisplay
- Status: Production completed

The Eurodisplay SR-01 Magic is a Czech ultralight and light-sport aircraft, designed and produced by Eurodisplay of Kozomín. The aircraft is supplied as a kit for amateur construction or as a complete ready-to-fly aircraft.

The company seems to have gone out of business in mid-2016 and production ended.

== Design and development ==
The SR-01 was designed to comply with the Fédération Aéronautique Internationale microlight rules and US light-sport aircraft rules. It features a swept cantilever low-wing, a two-seats-in-tandem enclosed cockpit under a bubble canopy, fixed, or optionally retractable, tricycle landing gear and a single engine in tractor configuration. The tandem arrangement was chosen to provide military trainer-like seating.

The aircraft is made from sheet aluminum. Its 9.45 m (31.0 ft) span wing has an area of 11.7 m^{2} (126 sq ft) and single-slotted flaps. Standard engines available are the 80 hp (60 kW) Rotax 912UL, the 100 hp (75 kW) Rotax 912ULS and the 115 hp (86 kW) Rotax 914 four-stroke powerplants.

== Variants ==
SR-01 Magic UL ProTrainer
Version for the European market with a gross weight of 472.5 kg (1,042 lb)
SR-01 Magic LSA ProTrainer
Version for the US light-sport market with a gross weight of 600 kg (1,323 lb)

== Specifications (SR-01 Magic UL ProTrainer) ==
Data from Bayerl and Eurodisplay

General characteristics

- Crew: one
- Capacity: one passenger
- Length: 6.860 m (22 ft 6 in)
- Wingspan: 9.45 m (31 ft 0 in)
- Height: 2.40 m (7 ft 10 in)
- Wing area: 11.7 m^{2} (126 sq ft)
- Empty weight: 360 kg (794 lb)
- Gross weight: 472.5 kg (1,042 lb)
- Fuel capacity: 140 litres (31 imp gal; 37 US gal) in two 70 litres (15 imp gal; 18 US gal) tanks
- Powerplant: 1 × Rotax 912UL four cylinder, liquid and air-cooled, four stroke aircraft engine, 60 kW (80 hp)

Performance

- Maximum speed: 220 km/h (140 mph, 120 kn)
- Stall speed: 64 km/h (40 mph, 35 kn) flaps down
- Never exceed speed: 250 km/h (160 mph, 130 kn)
- Range: 2,200 km (1,400 mi, 1,200 nmi)
- Service ceiling: 4,500 m (14,800 ft)
- g limits: +6/-3
- Rate of climb: 5 m/s (980 ft/min)
