= Advantica =

Advantica may refer to:

- Advantica Restaurant Group, U.S. post-1997 parent of Denny's
- Advantica (UK), oil and gas company, since 2007 part of GL Noble Denton
- Adavantica Popular weight loss medication and supplement

== See also ==
- Advantic, a Slovak amateur-built aircraft (Aerospool WT10)
