= Titanium Explorer =

Australian autogyro

Explorer

General information
- Type: Autogyro
- National origin: Australia
- Manufacturer: Titanium Auto Gyro
- Designer: Neil Sheather and Andrew Pepper
- Status: In production (2017)

The Titanium Explorer is an Australian autogyro designed by Neil Sheather and Andrew Pepper and produced by Titanium Auto Gyro (TAG Aviation Pty Limited) of Attunga, New South Wales. The aircraft is supplied complete and ready-to-fly, although development of a kit for amateur construction was underway in 2015.

== Design and development ==
Development of the design was started in 2009 as a result of noted deficiencies in imported autogyro designs for Australian conditions.

The Explorer features a single main rotor, a two-seats-in tandem open cockpit, each with a windshield, tricycle landing gear with wheel pants, plus a tail caster and a four-cylinder, liquid and air-cooled, four stroke 100 hp (75 kW) Rotax 912 or 115 hp (86 kW) turbocharged Rotax 914 engine in pusher configuration.

The aircraft fuselage box-section frame is made from titanium, while the cockpit fairing is made from carbon fiber reinforced polymer and fibreglass composites. Its two-bladed rotor has a diameter of 8.38 m (27.5 ft) and a chord of 22 cm (8.7 in). The design is noted for its rugged suspension, designed for Australian outback conditions.

The aircraft has a typical empty weight of 240 kg (529 lb) and a gross weight of 575 kg (1,268 lb), giving a useful load of 335 kg (739 lb). With full fuel of 85 litres (19 imp gal; 22 US gal) the payload for the pilot, passenger and baggage is 274 kg (604 lb).

== Specifications (Explorer) ==
Data from Tacke

General characteristics

- Crew: one
- Capacity: one passenger
- Empty weight: 240 kg (529 lb)
- Gross weight: 575 kg (1,268 lb)
- Fuel capacity: 85 litres (19 imp gal; 22 US gal)
- Powerplant: 1 × Rotax 914 four cylinder, liquid and air-cooled, four stroke turbocharged aircraft engine, 86 kW (115 hp)
- Main rotor diameter: 8.38 m (27 ft 6 in)
- Main rotor area: 55 m^{2} (590 sq ft)
- Propellers: 3-bladed composite

Performance

- Maximum speed: 185 km/h (115 mph, 100 kn)
- Cruise speed: 150 km/h (93 mph, 81 kn)
- Rate of climb: 8 m/s (1,600 ft/min)
- Disk loading: 10.5 kg/m^{2} (2.2 lb/sq ft)

== See also ==
- List of rotorcraft
