= Idea Hydropteron =

Hungarian flying boat

Hydropteron
- Hydropteron prototype

General information
- Type: Light-sport aircraft and Homebuilt aircraft
- National origin: Hungary
- Manufacturer: Idea Aircraft
- Status: Under development (2012)
- Number built: Prototypes only

History
- Introduction date: 2010
- First flight: 25 November 2009

The Idea Hydropteron (English: Water Wing) is a Hungarian light-sport aircraft and kit aircraft amphibious flying boat, under development by Idea Aircraft, of Miskolc. The Hydropteron was first flown on 25 November 2009 and introduced to the public at the AERO Friedrichshafen show in 2010. The aircraft is intended to be supplied as a kit for amateur construction or as a complete ready-to-fly-aircraft.

== Design and development ==
The aircraft was designed to comply with the US light-sport aircraft rules in its two-seat version and amateur-built rules as a three seater. It features a cantilever high-wing, a two-seats-in-side-by-side configuration enclosed cockpit under a bubble canopy, with a third seat optional, a cruciform tail, retractable tricycle landing gear and a single engine in pusher configuration.

The aircraft is made from composites. Its 10.9 m (35.8 ft) span wing, has an area of 12.47 m^{2} (134.2 sq ft) and flaps. The standard engine is the 115 hp (86 kW) Rotax 914 four-stroke turbocharged powerplant, but engines of up to 140 hp (104 kW) may be fitted. No wingtip floats are fitted and the aircraft relies on fuselage-mounted sponsons for water stability.

Production was originally scheduled for 2011, but as of early-2017 only prototypes appear to have been flown.

== Specifications (Hydropteron LSA) ==
Data from Bayerl, Tacke and Idea Aircraft

General characteristics

- Crew: one
- Capacity: one passenger
- Length: 6.9 m (22 ft 8 in)
- Wingspan: 10.9 m (35 ft 9 in)
- Height: 2.2 m (7 ft 3 in)
- Wing area: 12.47 m^{2} (134.2 sq ft)
- Empty weight: 360 kg (794 lb)
- Gross weight: 560 kg (1,235 lb)
- Fuel capacity: 50 litres (11 imp gal; 13 US gal)
- Powerplant: 1 × Rotax 914 four cylinder, liquid and air-cooled, four stroke turbocharged aircraft engine, 86 kW (115 hp)
- Propellers: 3-bladed composite

Performance

- Maximum speed: 220 km/h (140 mph, 120 kn)
- Cruise speed: 170 km/h (110 mph, 92 kn)
- Stall speed: 73 km/h (45 mph, 39 kn)
- Range: 700 km (430 mi, 380 nmi)
- Rate of climb: 3 m/s (590 ft/min)
- Wing loading: 44.9 kg/m^{2} (9.2 lb/sq ft)
