= Rotorvox C2A =

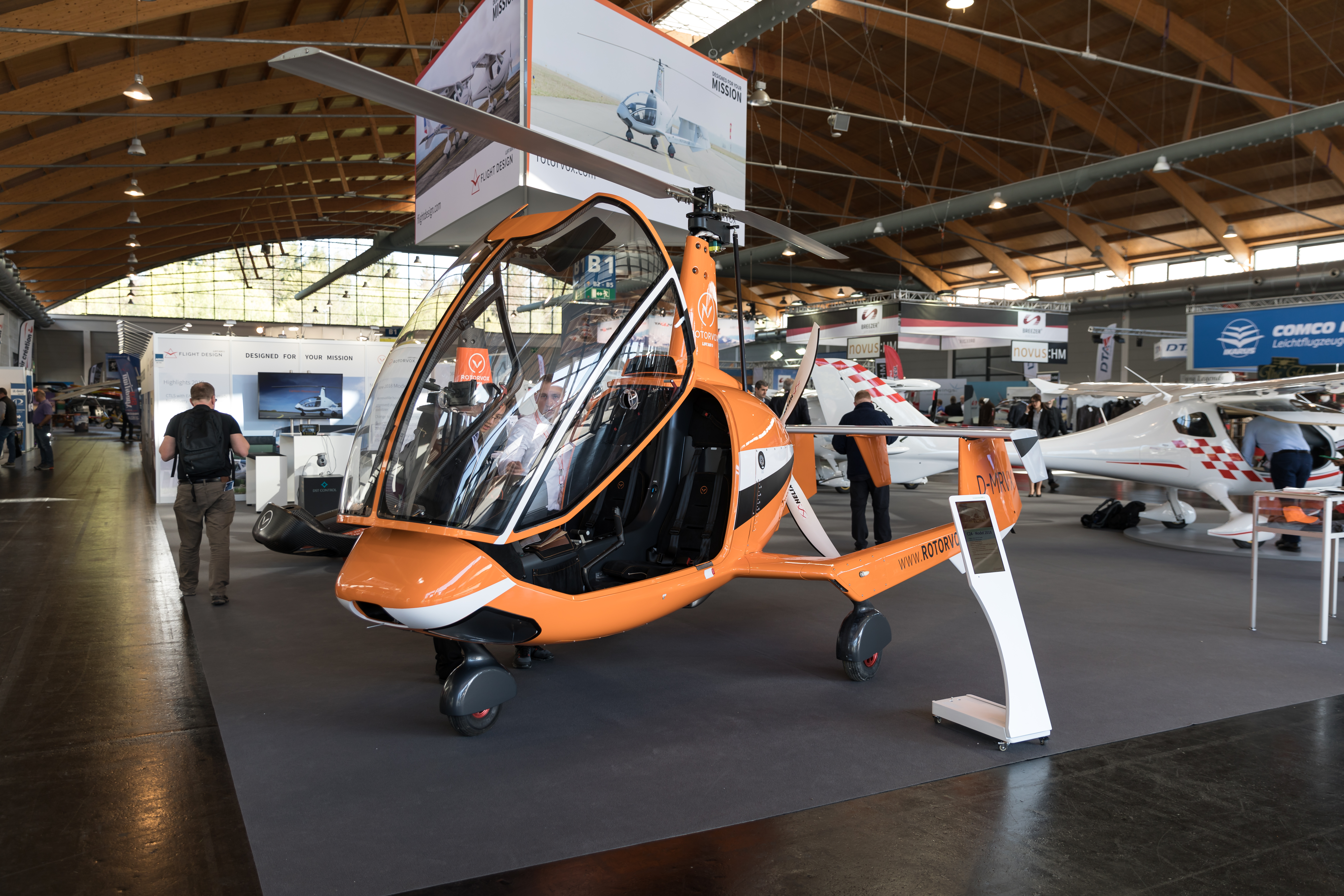

General information
- Type: Two seat autogyro
- National origin: Germany
- Manufacturer: Rotorvox GGC GmbH

History
- First flight: c.2009

The Rotorvox C2A is a two-seat, pusher configuration autogyro developed in Germany.

== Design and development ==
Structurally, the C2A is largely carbon-fibre monocoque. The fuselage pod contains a protective cell for the side-by-side seating behind a large, forward hinged, three piece canopy. A faired pylon, mounted immediately behind the cell supports a two blade aluminium rotor and behind it a 73 kW (98 hp) Rotax 914 liquid-cooled flat-four engine drives a three blade propeller. The rotor is pre-rotated hydraulically.

Flat-sided tail booms are held away from the fuselage on short stubs and each mounts a straight-tapered fin and rudder, their tips linked by the tailplane. There are shallow, long ventral fins. The C2A has a short-legged, wide track tricycle undercarriage with its mainwheels near to the forward end of the booms and a nosewheel under the forward fuselage.

At least two prototypes were flown over five years of development before C2A deliveries began in October 2014.

== Specifications ==
Data from Jane's All the World's Aircraft 2015/16 p.279

General characteristics

- Crew: Two
- Length: 5.50 m (18 ft 1 in) fuselage; including rotors 8.40 m (27 ft 7 in)
- Width: 2.21 m (7 ft 3 in) fuselage
- Height: 2.85 m (9 ft 4 in)
- Max takeoff weight: 560 kg (1,235 lb)
- Fuel capacity: 90 L (20 imp gal; 24 US gal)
- Powerplant: 1 × Rotax 914 liquid-cooled flat-four, 73 kW (98 hp) continuous
- Main rotor diameter: 8.40 m (27 ft 7 in) two aluminium blades, airfoil NACA 8H12
- Propellers: 3-bladed Duc, 1.75 m (5 ft 9 in) diameter

Performance

- Cruise speed: 145 km/h (90 mph, 78 kn)
- Never exceed speed: 164 km/h (102 mph, 89 kn)
- Range: 600 km (370 mi, 320 nmi)
- Endurance: maximum 6 hr
