= Aerospool WT9 Dynamic =

Slovak ultralight and light-sport aircraft

WT9 Dynamic
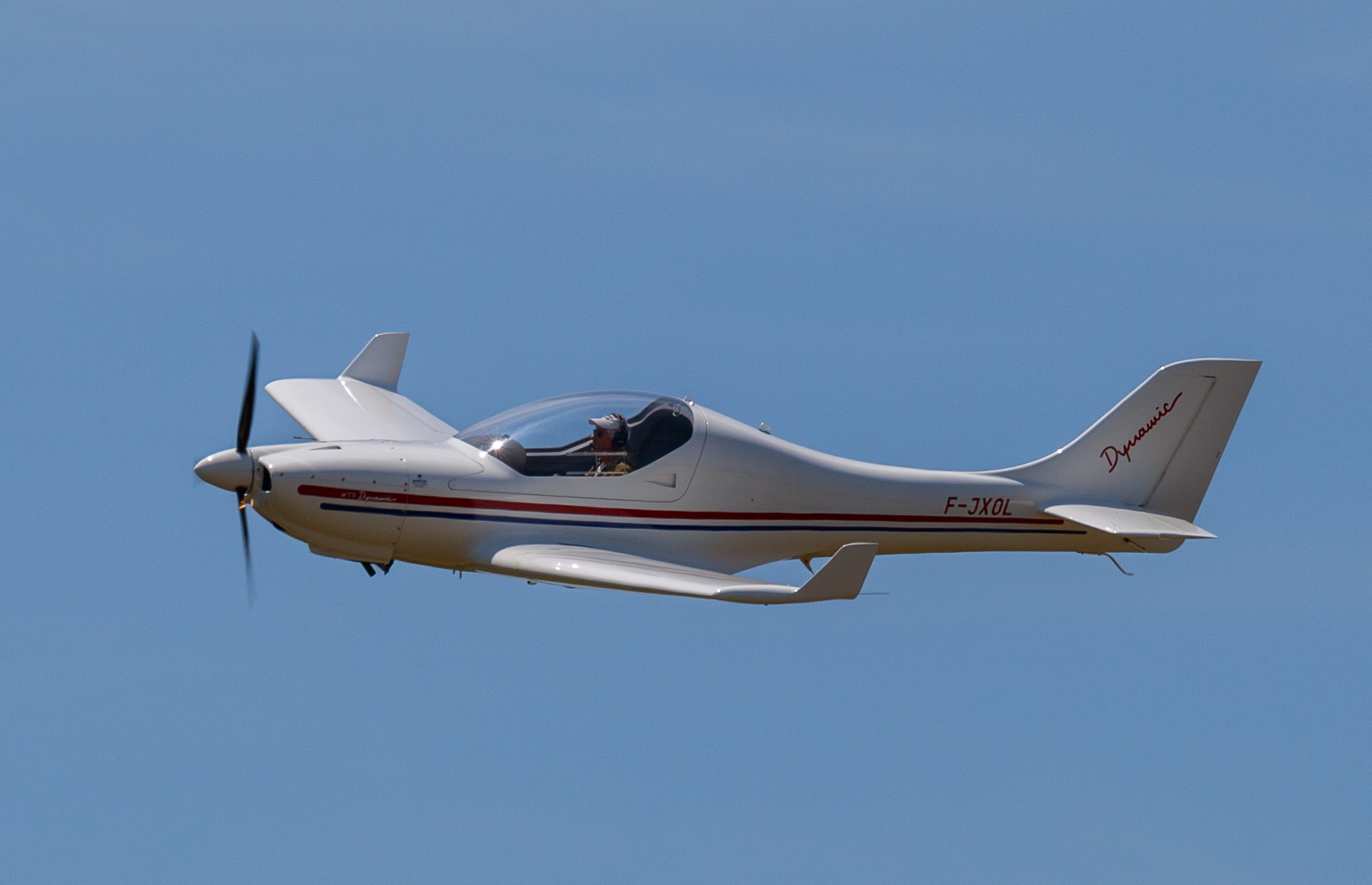

General information
- Type: Ultralight aircraft and Light-sport aircraft
- National origin: Slovakia
- Manufacturer: Aerospool
- Status: In production
- Number built: 950 (2001-2024)

History
- Variant: Aerospool WT10 Advantic

The Aerospool WT9 Dynamic is a Slovak ultralight and light-sport aircraft, designed and produced by Aerospool of Prievidza. The aircraft is supplied as a complete ready-to-fly-aircraft.

== Design and development ==
The aircraft was designed to comply with the Fédération Aéronautique Internationale microlight rules, US light-sport aircraft rules and UK BCAR Section "S". It features a cantilever low-wing, a two-seats-in-side-by-side configuration enclosed cockpit, fixed or retractable tricycle landing gear and a single engine in tractor configuration.

The aircraft is made with carbon fibre sandwich construction. The cockpit width is 1.15 m (45 in). Standard engines available are the 75 kW (100 hp) Rotax 912ULS, the Rotax 912iS and the 86 kW (115 hp) Rotax 914 four-stroke powerplants. A glider towhook is optional equipment.

The design has been developed into a three to four seat aircraft, the Aerospool WT10 Advantic.

== Variants ==
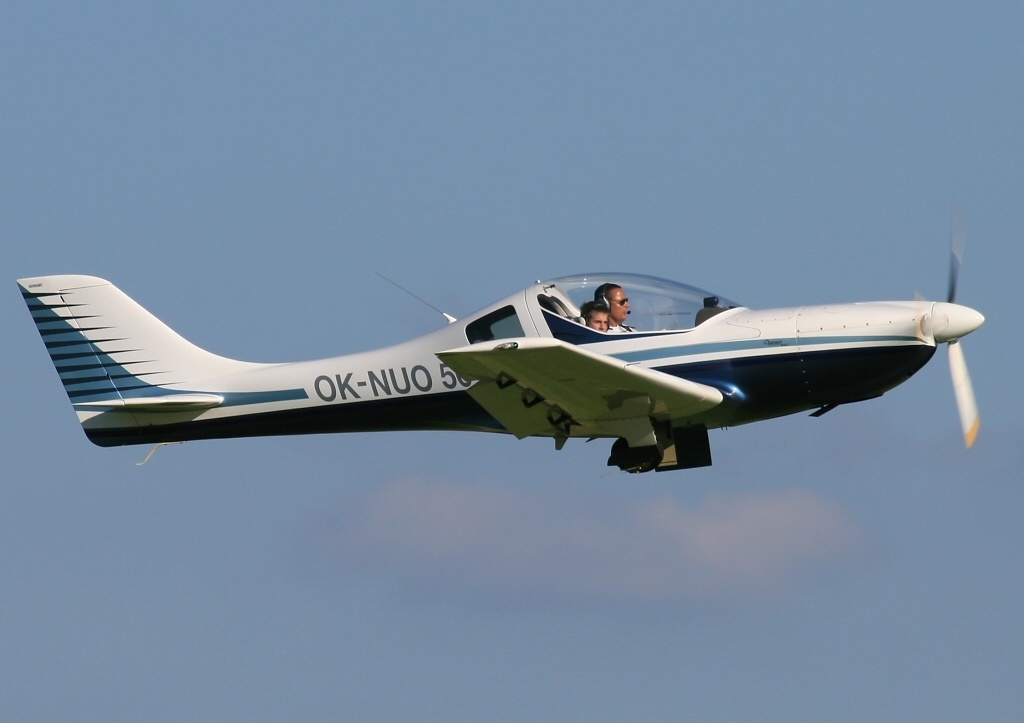
Aerospool WT9 Dynamic with retractable gear

Microlight version
Base model with gross weight of 450 kg (992 lb) and 75 litres (16 imp gal; 20 US gal) fuel capacity for the European microlight category
LSA version
Model with gross weight of 600 kg (1,323 lb) and 126 litres (28 imp gal; 33 US gal) fuel capacity for the US light-sport aircraft category. Standard empty weight is 300 kg (661 lb), useful load 300.5 kg (662 lb), range 1,397 km (868 mi).
Dynamic Club
EASA Type Certified Model in Restricted airworthiness category to meet Certification Specification CS-LSA, two-seats with fixed landing gear and powered by a Rotax 912 ULS2.
Dynamic GTi

LTF-UL German certified. Cruise at 167 kn (309 km/h; 192 mph) with retractable gear or 156 kn (289 km/h; 180 mph) with fixed gear. Powered by the 105 kW (141 hp) Rotax 915iS. The Rotax 916 120 kW (160 hp) version is currently under testing.

== Accidents and incidents ==
- On 26 May 2021, after the landing of a Aerospool WT-9 Dynamic, the nose wheel collapsed, the pilot escaped unhurt.

== Specifications (WT9 Dynamic European microlight version) ==
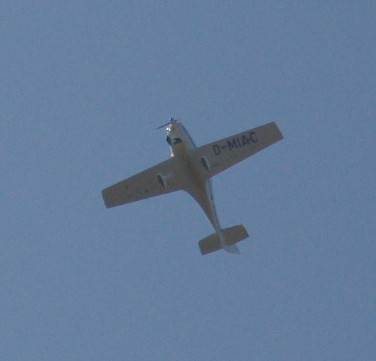
Aerospool WT9 Dynamic in flight

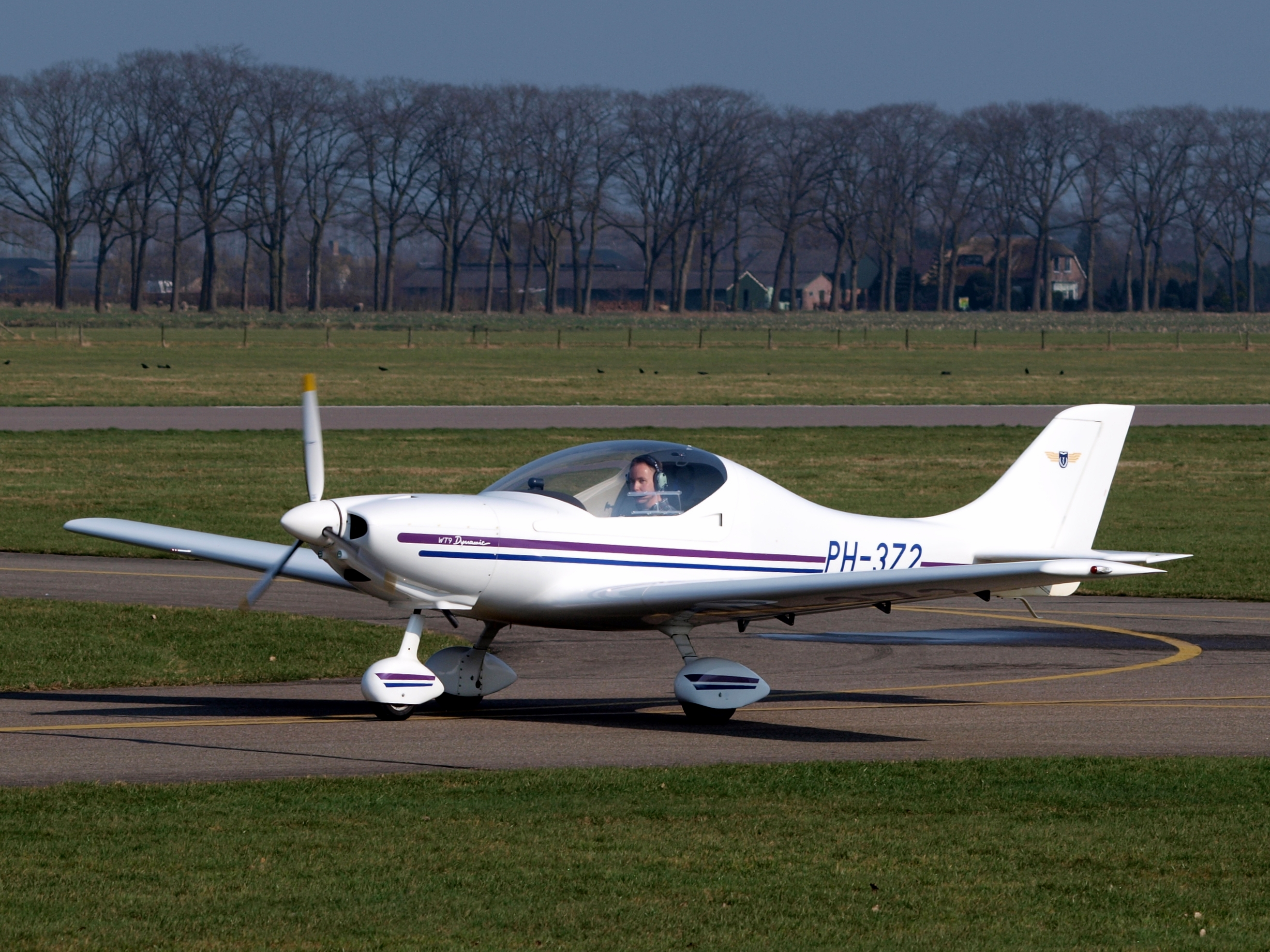
Aerospool WT9 Dynamic with fixed landing gear

Data from Bayerl, Tacke and Aerospool

General characteristics

- Crew: two
- Capacity: one passenger and one pilot
- Length: 6.40 m (21 ft 0 in)
- Wingspan: 9.00 m (29 ft 6 in)
- Height: 2 m (6 ft 7 in)
- Wing area: 10.35 m^{2} (111.4 sq ft)
- Empty weight: 350 kg (772 lb)
- Gross weight: 600 kg (1,323 lb) MTOW depends on certification
- Fuel capacity: 75 litres (16 imp gal; 20 US gal) standard, 125 litres (27 imp gal; 33 US gal) optional
- Powerplant: 1 × Rotax 915iS four cylinder, liquid and air-cooled, four stroke, 105 kW (141 hp)

Performance

- Cruise speed: 250 km/h (155 mph, 135 kn)
- Stall speed: 65 km/h (40 mph, 35 kn)
- Never exceed speed: 280 km/h (174 mph, 151 kn)
- Range: 1,600 km (990 mi, 860 nmi)
- Rate of climb: 10 m/s (2,000 ft/min)
