= Aerospool =

Aerospool, spol sro
- Company type: Spoločnosť s ručením obmedzeným
- Industry: Aerospace
- Predecessor: Aero-club Prievidza
- Founded: 1990
- Headquarters: Prievidza, Slovakia
- Products: Ultralight aircraft, aircraft kits
- Services: aircraft maintenance
- Website: www.aerospool.sk

Aerospool, spol sro is a Slovak aircraft manufacturer based in Prievidza. The company specializes in the design and manufacture of ultralight and kit aircraft in the form of kits for amateur construction and ready-to-fly aircraft. They also build major components for gliders as well as repairing and re-finishing gliders.

The company was founded at the end of 1990 by members of the Aero-club Prievidza.

The company is organized as a spoločnosť s ručením obmedzeným, a Slovak private limited company.

== History ==
The company's first product was the fuselage for the WT3 glider. The company then branched into making hand-laid-up fibreglass transport trailers for gliders, producing more than 120 of them.

The company took on subcontract work and built more than 100 fuselages for the InterPlane Skyboy ultralight aircraft. They produced components for the WT6, the Radab Windex and the Aeropro Eurofox.

In 1992 they designed their own aircraft the Aerospool Compact.

In 1993 Aerospool commenced offering repairs for Schempp-Hirth gliders and was approved by the German airworthiness authority, the Luftfahrt-Bundesamt. They started producing Schempp-Hirth gliders under contract and by 2017 were building tailplanes, elevators and winglets for the Schempp-Hirth Ventus-2C, as well as carrying out pre-assembly, painting and final assembly.

In 1996 the Impulz first flew in prototype form and was developed into the WT9 Dynamic in 2000. The two-seat WT9 Dynamic achieved commercial success and over 500 had been delivered by 2015. The three-to-four seat version of the WT9 is the WT10 Advantic, which was first flown on 11 April 2013 and remained under development in 2017. The WT10 is intended to be supplied as a kit for amateur construction once production begins.

== Aircraft ==
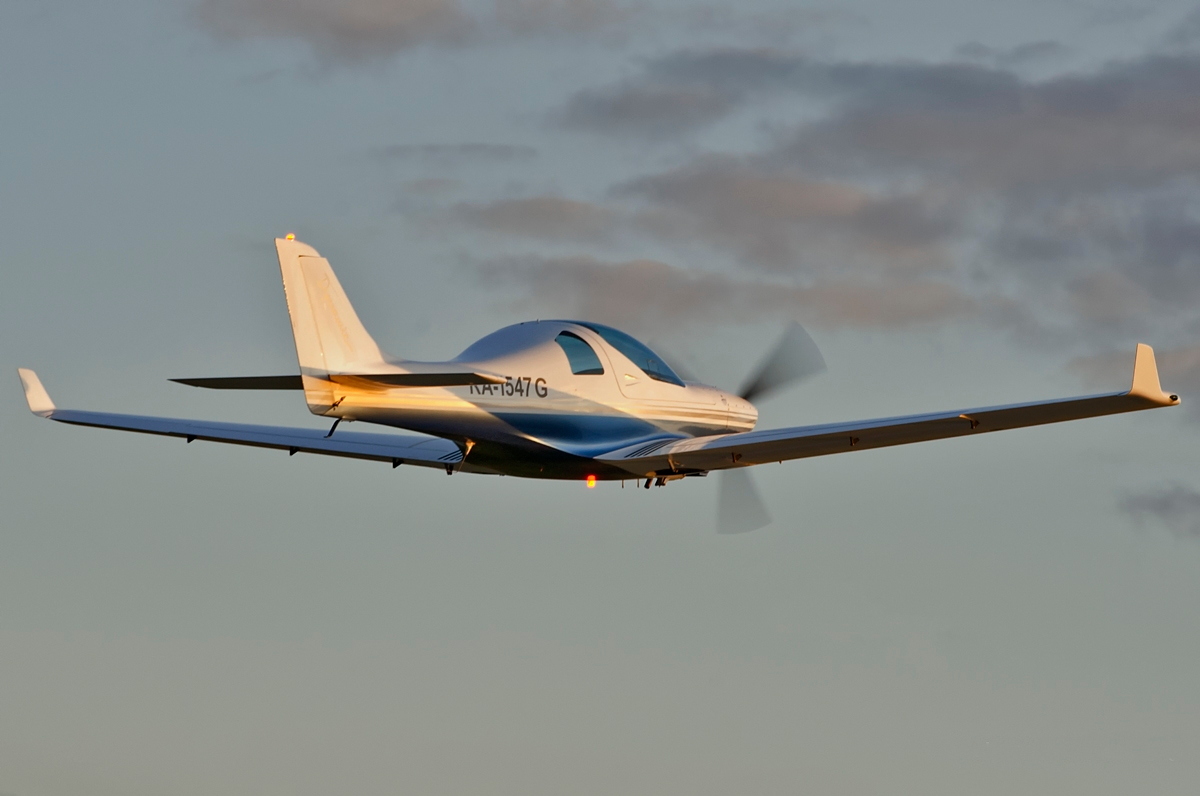
Aerospool WT9 Dynamic

Summary of aircraft built by Aerospool:

- Aerospool WT9 Dynamic
- Aerospool WT10 Advantic
- Schempp-Hirth Ventus-2C
