= Rotax 914 =

Austrian turbocharged aircraft engine

914
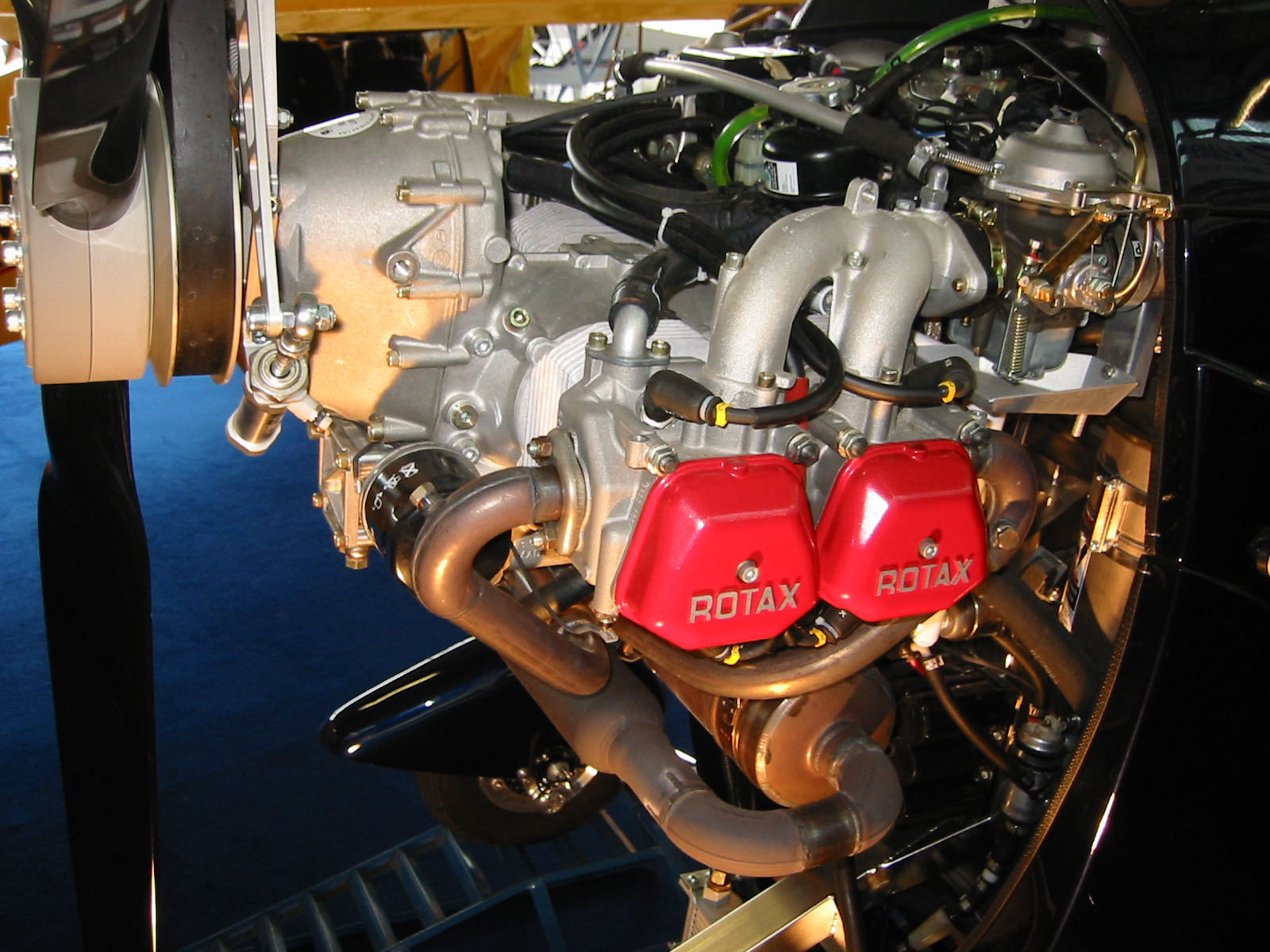
- Type: Piston aircraft engine
- National origin: Austria
- Manufacturer: Rotax
- Major applications: Light aircraft, unmanned aerial vehicles
- Manufactured: 1996–present
- Developed from: Rotax 912

The Rotax 914 is a turbo-charged, four-stroke, four-cylinder, horizontally opposed aircraft engine with air-cooled cylinders and water-cooled cylinder heads. It is designed and built by the Austrian company BRP-Powertrain, owned by Bombardier Recreational Products (BRP), as part of its Rotax brand.

The engine commonly powers certified light aircraft, homebuilt aircraft, autogyros and military UAVs such as the MQ-1 Predator.

== Design and development ==
Introduced in 1996, the Rotax 914 is a turbocharged development of the Rotax 912.

The Rotax 914 has a turbocharger with an automatic wastegate controller and dual carburetors. It features dual capacitor discharge ignition, liquid-cooled cylinder heads and air-cooled cylinder barrels, an electric starter, a built in propeller reduction gearbox, dry sump forced oil lubrication and has a separate oil tank. It has hydraulic valves that include automatic adjustment. Rotax can provide a purpose-designed air intake, exhaust system and engine mount.

The 914 oil system differs from most dry-sump designs in that lubricating oil is forced into the storage tank by crankcase pressure rather than by a separate scavenge pump. This requires a novel preflight inspection procedure: before checking the oil level with the dipstick, the engine is "burped" by removing the oil filler cap and turning the propeller until a gurgling sound is heard, which indicates that all oil has been forced into the tank and the oil level can now be checked accurately.

The 914 is more fuel efficient and lighter than similarly sized traditional engines, but originally had a shorter time between overhaul (TBO), restricting its market potential. On introduction, the TBO was only 600 hours, which was double that of previous Rotax engines but far short of existing engines of comparable size and power. However, by 1999 the TBO had been increased to 1,000 hours, and it was increased again to 2,000 hours in 2010.

The engine can be operated on 100LL leaded avgas or on unleaded regular automotive gasoline, with a minimum RON of 95. If the 914 is operated using leaded fuel, lead sludge will accumulate in the oil tank and reduction gearbox, and the fuel is incompatible with the recommended synthetic oil because it cannot hold lead in suspension; consequently, using leaded fuel mandates additional maintenance, and unleaded fuel is recommended.

== Variants ==
914 F
Family of engine versions certified to US Federal Aviation Administration FAR 33 and EASA JAR-E. These include:
- 914 F2: Version equipped to accept a fixed pitch propeller.
- 914 F3: Version equipped with a hydraulic governor for a constant speed propeller.
- 914 F4: Version equipped to accept a hydraulic governor for a constant speed propeller.
914 UL
Non-certified engine version for homebuilt and ultralight aircraft.

== Applications ==
- Aero Adventure Pegasus
- Aerospool WT9 Dynamic
- Aerospool WT10 Advantic
- Air Copter A3C
- Alisport Yuma
- Alpi Pioneer 300
- Alpi Pioneer 400T
- Australian Aircraft Kits Hornet STOL
- AutoGyro MT-03
- AutoGyro Calidus
- AutoGyro Cavalon
- Aviomania Genesis Duo G2SA
- B&F Fk14 Polaris
- Bauer BAD-12 Gyrotrainer
- Blackshape Prime
- Bushcaddy R-80
- Bushcaddy R-120
- The Butterfly Super Sky Cycle
- Celier Kiss
- Celier Xenon 2
- Chayair Sycamore
- Criquet Storch
- Denel Dynamics Bateleur
- Diamond HK36 Super Dimona
- Dorna Parandeh Abi
- Dova DV-1 Skylark
- DTA J-RO
- Dyn'Aéro MCR4S
- Dynali H2S
- Dynali H3 EasyFlyer
- ELA 07
- ELA 10 Eclipse
- Elbit Hermes 900
- Eurodisplay SR-01 Magic
- Europa XS
- FD-Composites ArrowCopter
- Flying Legend Hawker Hurricane Replica
- General Aviation Design Bureau T-32 Maverick
- HB Flugtechnik HB-207 Alfa
- Heli-Sport CH-7 Kompress helicopter
- Heli-Sport CH77 Ranabot helicopter
- Ibis GS-501 Urraco
- IAI Heron
- Idea Hydropteron
- Just Superstol
- Magni M-14 Scout
- Magni M-24 Orion
- Qods Mohajer-6
- M&D Flugzeugbau Samburo
- MQ-1 Predator
- NAL Hansa
- Norman Aviation Nordic VI
- Norman Aviation Nordic 8 Mini Explorer
- Pagotto Brakogyro
- Pelegrin Tarragon
- Phenix Aviation Phenix
- Progressive Aerodyne SeaRey
- RMT Bateleur
- Roko Aero NG4
- Rokospol Via
- Rotor Flight Dynamics Dominator
- RotorSport UK Calidus
- RotorSport UK MT-03
- Rotorvox C2A
- Scheibe Falke
- Shaanxi Baojii Special Vehicles Lie Ying Falcon
- Shahed 129
- SkyCruiser Autogyro SkyCruiser
- SkyStar Pulsar
- Softeks V-24 Lastochka
- Sonaca 200
- SlipStream Genesis
- Stemme S10 motor glider
- Storm 300
- Storm RG Fury
- Titan T-51 Mustang
- Titanium Explorer
- TL-Ultralight Stream
- Trixy Liberty
- Ultravia Pelican
- Wild DoubleEnder
- Wüst Seahawk

== Specifications (914) ==
=== General characteristics ===
- Type: four-cylinder, four-stroke liquid- / air-cooled engine with opposed cylinders
- Bore: 79.5 mm (3.13 in)
- Stroke: 61 mm (2.4 in)
- Displacement: 1,211.2 cc (73.91 cu in)
- Length: 561 mm (22.1 in)
- Width: 576 mm (22.7 in)
- Dry weight: 78 kg (172 lb) with electric starter, carburetors, fuel pump, air filters and oil system

=== Components ===
- Valvetrain: OHV, hydraulic lifters, pushrods, rocker arms
- Fuel system: Dual CD carburetors, dual electric pumps
- Fuel type: Unleaded: 91 octane AKI (Canada/USA) / 95 octane RON (European) or higher
- Oil system: Dry sump with trochoid pump, camshaft driven
- Cooling system: Liquid-cooled cylinder heads, air-cooled cylinders
- Reduction gear: Integrated reduction gear 1:2.273; 1:2.43 optional
- Electronic dual ignition

=== Performance ===
- Power output: Maximum 84 kW (115 hp) at 5,800 rpm, with 5 minute time limit; 73 kW (100 hp) continuous

== See also ==
- Rotax aircraft engines

Related lists

- List of aircraft engines
