= Phenix Aviation Phenix =

Spanish autogyro

Phenix

General information
- Type: Autogyro
- National origin: Spain
- Manufacturer: Phenix Aviation
- Status: Under development (2013)
- Number built: Two prototypes

History
- First flight: 11 December 2009

The Phenix Aviation Phenix (English: Phoenix) is a Spanish autogyro, under development by Phenix Aviation of Alicante. The aircraft is intended to be supplied as a complete ready-to-fly-aircraft.

The project was first announced at the Aero 09 show held in Friedrichshafen, Germany in 2009. The first prototype flew in 2010, with the second prototype flying in 2011.

== Design and development ==
The Phenix is constructed mostly from carbon fibre and of pod and boom layout. It features a single, two-bladed Wagtail or 8.40 m (27.6 ft) diameter Averso main rotor with a chord of 21.4 cm (8.4 in) mounted at the top of a tall column. It has a two-seats-in side-by-side configuration enclosed cockpit with forward hinged doors on both sides, tricycle landing gear and a four-cylinder, air and liquid-cooled, four-stroke, dual-ignition turbocharged 115 hp (86 kW) Rotax 914 engine in tractor configuration. The tractor layout provides better propeller efficiency and less noise, but at the cost of reduced forward cockpit visibility. Behind the seats is a separate baggage space, accessed externally from either side through its own doors.

The short rear fuselage carries a broad tailplane with octagonal endplate fins that have rudders mounted on them. The first prototype had another central, ventral underfin with its own rudder. A ballistic parachute is installed in the tail cone.

The first Phenix flew on 11 December 2009, after being displayed at Aero '09 in Friedrichshafen in April that year. This first prototype was flown from the left hand seat but the second, first flown on 30 September 2011 adopted the standard helicopter right hand layout. The Phenix is designed to meet the British BCAR-T standards. Two versions are under development: the Ultralight, to meet European regulations and the Experimental for South Africa.

The aircraft has an empty weight of 285 kg (628 lb) and a gross weight of 450 kg (992 lb), giving a useful load of 165 kg (364 lb).

== Specifications (Phenix) ==
Data from Bayerl and Jane's All the World's Aircraft 2013-14, p.619. Performance figures are estimates.

General characteristics

- Crew: one
- Capacity: one passenger
- Length: 5.20 m (17 ft 1 in)
- Width: 2.28 m (7 ft 6 in)
- Height: 3.20 m (10 ft 6 in)
- Empty weight: 285 kg (628 lb)
- Gross weight: 472.5 kg (1,042 lb)
- Fuel capacity: 80 litres (18 imp gal; 21 US gal)
- Powerplant: 1 × Rotax 914 four cylinder, liquid and air-cooled, turbocharged four stroke aircraft engine, 86 kW (115 hp)
- Main rotor diameter: 8.40 m (27 ft 7 in)
- Main rotor area: 57.21 m^{2} (615.8 sq ft)
- Propellers: 3-bladed composite

Performance

- Maximum speed: 180 km/h (110 mph, 97 kn)
- Cruise speed: 160 km/h (99 mph, 86 kn)
- Endurance: 4 hours
- Disk loading: 8.26 kg/m^{2} (1.69 lb/sq ft)

Avionics

- MGL Enigma or Odyssey EFIS
- AviMap EKP IV GPS
