= SkyCruiser Autogyro SkyCruiser =

Hungarian autogyro

SkyCruiser

General information
- Type: Autogyro
- National origin: Hungary
- Manufacturer: SkyCruiser Autogyro KFT
- Status: In production (2017)

The SkyCruiser Autogyro SkyCruiser is a series of Hungarian autogyros designed and produced by SkyCruiser Autogyro KFT of Inárcs. It was publicly introduced at the AERO Friedrichshafen airshow in 2014. The aircraft is supplied complete and ready-to-fly.

== Design and development ==
The SkyCruiser features a single main rotor, a two-seats-in tandem open cockpit with a windshield, tricycle landing gear with wheel pants, plus a tail caster and a four-cylinder, liquid and air-cooled, four stroke 115 hp (86 kW) Rotax 914 turbocharged engine or modified 125 hp (93 kW) turbocharged Rotax 912 in pusher configuration.

The aircraft fuselage is made from composites and has a two-bladed rotor with a diameter of 8.4 m (27.6 ft) and an electronic pre-rotator. The aircraft has a gross weight of 560 kg (1,235 lb).

The design features an automatic propeller system. When the electronic pre-rotator for the main rotor is engaged the pusher propeller automatically goes to flat pitch and creates no thrust. When the pilot moved the control stick aft to take-off the propeller automatically goes to best climb setting.

In 2011 an improved version was introduced called the SC-200 "New Face", with aesthetic changes, including a more rounded cockpit fairing and wider cockpit seating. The original model was then renamed the "SC-200 Standard".

== Specifications (SkyCruiser) ==
Data from Tacke

General characteristics

- Crew: one
- Capacity: one passenger
- Gross weight: 560 kg (1,235 lb)
- Fuel capacity: 104 litres (23 imp gal; 27 US gal)
- Powerplant: 1 × Rotax 914 four cylinder, liquid and air-cooled, four stroke turbocharged aircraft engine, 86 kW (115 hp)
- Main rotor diameter: 8.4 m (27 ft 7 in)
- Main rotor area: 55 m^{2} (590 sq ft)
- Propellers: 3-bladed composite

Performance

- Maximum speed: 185 km/h (115 mph, 100 kn)
- Cruise speed: 145 km/h (90 mph, 78 kn)
- Disk loading: 10.2 kg/m^{2} (2.1 lb/sq ft)

== See also ==
- List of rotorcraft
