= RMT Bateleur =

German ultralight aircraft

Bateleur

General information
- Type: Ultralight aircraft and Light-sport aircraft
- National origin: Germany
- Manufacturer: RMT Aviation
- Designer: Andre von Schoenebeck
- Status: In production (2012)

The RMT Bateleur (named for the bird species) is a German ultralight and light-sport aircraft, designed by Andre von Schoenebeck and produced by RMT Aviation of Bad Bocklet. The aircraft is supplied as a kit for amateur construction or as a complete ready-to-fly-aircraft.

== Design and development ==
The aircraft was designed by von Schoenebeck as his first full-sized aircraft after a career of designing competition model gliders. The Bateleur was intended to comply with the Fédération Aéronautique Internationale microlight rules and US light-sport aircraft rules. The company also plans to type certify it to FAR 23 standards.

The Bateleur features a delta wing layout with a canard. The wing is a cantilever low-wing design. The aircraft also features two-seats-in-tandem under separate bubble canopies, fixed or optionally retractable tricycle landing gear and a single engine in pusher configuration. The light-sport version will have fixed landing gear as that category's rules require and a gross weight of 600 kg (1,323 lb).

The aircraft is made from composites. Its 6.25 m (20.5 ft) span wing has an area of 14 m^{2} (150 sq ft) and flaps mounted on the main and canard wings. Standard engines available are the 100 hp (75 kW) Rotax 912ULS and the turbocharged, 115 hp (86 kW) Rotax 914 four-stroke powerplants. Landing gear is fixed for the US light-sport aircraft market or retractable for the homebuilt version.

Production was initially established in South Africa, moved to Germany, and finally to the United States in 2012.

As of March 2017, the design does not appear on the Federal Aviation Administration's list of approved special light-sport aircraft.

== Specifications (Bateleur) ==
Data from Bayerl

General characteristics

- Crew: one
- Capacity: one passenger
- Wingspan: 6.25 m (20 ft 6 in)
- Wing area: 14 m^{2} (150 sq ft)
- Empty weight: 250 kg (551 lb)
- Gross weight: 450 kg (992 lb)
- Fuel capacity: 76 litres (17 imp gal; 20 US gal)
- Powerplant: 1 × Rotax 912ULS four cylinder, liquid and air-cooled, four stroke aircraft engine, 75 kW (101 hp)

Performance

- Maximum speed: 320 km/h (200 mph, 170 kn)
- Cruise speed: 300 km/h (190 mph, 160 kn)
- Stall speed: 65 km/h (40 mph, 35 kn)
- Endurance: 7 hours at 275 km/h (171 mph)
- Rate of climb: 7 m/s (1,400 ft/min)
- Wing loading: 42.9 kg/m^{2} (8.8 lb/sq ft)
