= ELA 07 =

Spanish autogyro

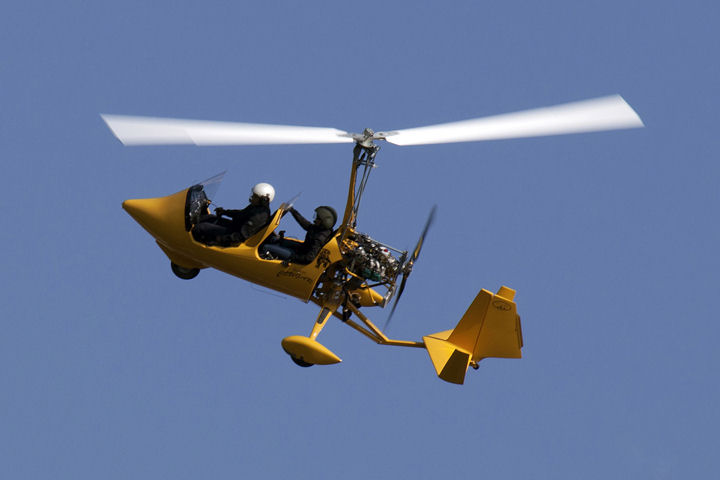
- ELA 07S

General information
- Type: Autogyro
- National origin: Spain
- Manufacturer: ELA Aviación
- Status: In production (2012)

The ELA 07 is a series of Spanish autogyros, designed and produced by ELA Aviación of Córdoba, Andalusia. The aircraft are supplied complete and ready to fly.

== Design and development ==
The ELA 07 series features a single main rotor, a two-seats-in-tandem open cockpit with a windshield, tricycle landing gear with wheel pants and a four-cylinder, air-cooled, four-stroke, dual-ignition 100 hp (75 kW) Rotax 912S engine in pusher configuration. The turbocharged 115 hp (86 kW) Rotax 914 powerplant is optional.

The aircraft fuselage is made from TIG welded, CNC laser-cut stainless steel tubing for corrosion resistance. The cockpit fairing is non-structural carbon fibre and resin. Its 8.23 m (27.0 ft) diameter rotor has a chord of 22 cm (8.7 in) and is mounted to a rotor head made from a combination of stainless steel and 7075 T6 aluminium. The triple tail is also made from carbon fibre and resin. Equipment fitted includes a pre-rotator, pneumatic pitch trim and mechanical roll trim. The Cougar version has an empty weight of 250 kg (550 lb) and a gross weight of 450 kg (990 lb), giving a useful load of 200 kg (440 lb). A forward baggage compartment with a volume of 60 litres (13 imp gal; 16 US gal) is optional.

== Operational history ==
By January 2013 two examples had been registered in the United Kingdom with the Civil Aviation Authority.

== Variants ==
ELA 07 Agro
Agricultural aircraft version with the rear seat replaced by a 130 litres (29 imp gal; 34 US gal) tank that can be used to apply liquids or solids in ultra-low volumes. The aircraft fits an 8 m (26.2 ft) spray boom and an enlarged windshield. The Agro can be quickly returned to two-seat configuration by removal of the spraying equipment.
ELA 07 Cougar
Version for recreational touring use, with a single windshield for the front cockpit.
ELA 07S
Version for flight training use, with two windshields, one for each cockpit, plus dual controls.

== Specifications (ELA 07 Cougar) ==
Data from Bayerl and ELA

General characteristics

- Crew: one
- Capacity: one passenger
- Empty weight: 250 kg (551 lb)
- Gross weight: 450 kg (992 lb)
- Fuel capacity: 75 litres (16 imp gal; 20 US gal)
- Powerplant: 1 × Rotax 912ULS four cylinder, liquid and air-cooled, four stroke aircraft engine, 75 kW (101 hp)
- Main rotor diameter: 8.23 m (27 ft 0 in)
- Propellers: 3-bladed composite

Performance

- Maximum speed: 185 km/h (115 mph, 100 kn)
- Cruise speed: 140 km/h (87 mph, 76 kn)
- Never exceed speed: 175 km/h (109 mph, 94 kn)
- Range: 400 km (250 mi, 220 nmi)
- Rate of climb: 5 m/s (980 ft/min)
