= Softeks V-24 Lastivka =

Ukrainian utility aircraft

V-24 Lastivka

General information
- Type: Four seat twin engined pusher utility aircraft
- National origin: Ukraine
- Manufacturer: Softeks
- Designer: Victor Vashchenko

History
- First flight: 20 November 2012

The Softeks V-24 Lastivka (Ластівка, Swallow) is a four-seat, twin pusher engined utility aircraft, designed and built in Ukraine in the 2010s for survey and transport work. The first prototype flew late in 2012.

== Design and development ==
The Lastochka is designed for a wide range of utility work, such as fire and geological surveys, freight transport and passenger carrying. It is a low wing monoplane constructed largely of composites, with straight tapered wings tipped with winglets. Their trailing edges carry slotted ailerons and slotted flaps. Two 73.5 kW (99 hp) Rotax 912 ULS air-cooled flat four engines are mounted in pusher configuration on pylons over the wings in short cowlings, positioned with their propeller discs as close as possible to the fuselage. 84.5 kW (113 hp) Rotax 914 engines are an alternative.

The nose and cabin transparencies are smoothly contoured, with no windscreen step, and entry is by an upward opening door on each side forward of the wing leading edge. There are transparencies aft of those in the doors, placed over the wing. A baggage space has a maximum volume of 0.20 m^{3} (7.1 ft^{3}), depending on layout details. The upper fuselage line drops gently behind the cabin to the T-tail, where the fin is integral with the fuselage, straight edged and swept, with a backward leaning rudder hinge. The rudder, with a swept trailing edge, has a horn balance extending forward of the hinge line under the fuselage, where it is faired into a small ventral fin. There is a small, electrically activated rudder trim tab, set low down. A high aspect ratio, rectangular tailplane is placed on top of the fin, bearing a similarly shaped one piece elevator. This has a central trim tab.

The Lastochka has a tricycle undercarriage with main legs retracting inwards; each leg has a pneumatic shock absorber and carries a single wheel fitted with hydraulic brakes. The nosewheel retracts forwards. The aircraft is designed to operate from water or snow, using floats or skis, if required.

The first flight took place on 20 November 2012 and the Lastochka was first demonstrated in public at the SP Korolyov Aviation Meeting, held from 17 to 20 Jane 2010 at Smokovka airport, Zhytomyr.

== Specifications (Rotax 912 ULS) ==
Data from Jane's All the World's Aircraft 2013-14, pp.655-6

General characteristics

- Capacity: Four, including one or two pilots
- Length: 7.34 m (24 ft 1 in)
- Wingspan: 11.18 m (36 ft 8 in)
- Height: 2.98 m (9 ft 9 in)
- Wing area: 11.74 m^{2} (126.4 sq ft) gross
- Empty weight: 760 kg (1,676 lb)
- Max takeoff weight: 1,300 kg (2,866 lb)
- Fuel capacity: 250 L (55 Imp gal; 66 US gal); 180 kg (400 lb). Provision for additional tankage.
- Maximum payload: 400 kg (881 kg)
- Take-off run: 250 m (820 ft)
- Landing run: 200 m (660 ft)
- Recovery parachute: Galaxy GRS 1200 ballistic
- Powerplant: 2 × Rotax 912 ULS liquid cooled flat four, 73.5 kW (98.6 hp) each
- Propellers: 2-bladed MT-Propeller MTV-21-A-C-F/CFL0178-51, 1.78 m (5 ft 10 in) diameter variable pitch pusher

Performance

- Maximum speed: 300 km/h (190 mph, 160 kn)
- Cruise speed: 265 km/h (165 mph, 143 kn) at 65% power
- Stall speed: 90 km/h (56 mph, 49 kn) flaps down
- Never exceed speed: 350 km/h (220 mph, 190 kn)
- Range: 1,500 km (930 mi, 810 nmi)
- Service ceiling: 5,100 m (16,700 ft) service
- Rate of climb: 8.0 m/s (1,570 ft/min) at sea level
- Wing loading: 110.7 kg/m^{2} (22.7 lb/sq ft) maximum
- Power/mass: 113 W/kg (0.069 hp/lb) minimum

Avionics

- Dynon Avionics twin screen electronic flight instrument system
- Autopilot
