= Celier Aviation =

Aircraft manufacturer specializing in autogyros

- Company type: Privately held company
- Industry: Aerospace
- Founded: 1993
- Founder: Raphael Celier
- Headquarters: Safi, Malta
- Products: Autogyros

Celier Aviation is an aircraft manufacturer, founded by Raphael Celier in France in 1993. The company was moved to Piotrków Trybunalski, Poland in 2006 and Safi, Malta in 2017. The company specializes in the design and manufacture of autogyros available in kit form and also as fully assembled aircraft.

The company established its reputation with the two-seat side-by-side configuration Celier Xenon 2 series of autogyros. By 2011 over 100 of these were flying. Celier subsequently developed a tandem-seat design, the Kiss, but it was not produced in large numbers. By 2014 the company was offering only the Xenon 4, a development of the Xenon 2.

The company also developed the XeWing, a fixed wing light aircraft using the fuselage and engine of the Xenon 2, but mounting a folding strut-braced parasol wing in place of the autogyro's main rotor. The design was shown at AERO Friedrichshafen in 2009, but was never offered for sale and it is unlikely it was ever developed beyond a single prototype.

== Aircraft ==
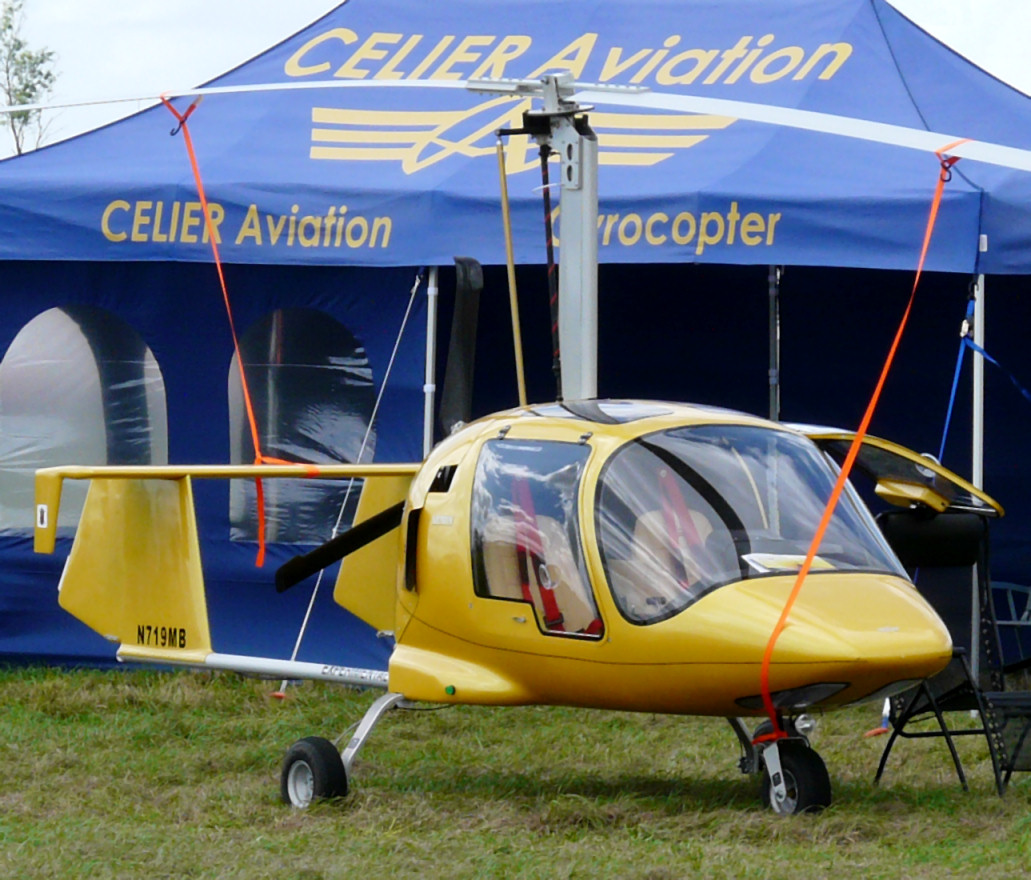
A Celier Xenon 2 on display at Sun 'n Fun in Lakeland, Florida, United States, 2008.

Summary of aircraft built by Celier Aviation
| Model name | First flight | Number built | Type |
|---|---|---|---|
| Celier Xenon 2 | | over 100 (by 2011) | two seat gyroplane |
| Celier Xenon 3 | | | two seat gyroplane |
| Celier Xenon 4 | | | two seat gyroplane |
| Celier Kiss | | | two seat gyroplane |
| Celier XeWing | | one | two seat light aircraft |
