= Wüst Seahawk =

German homebuilt aircraft

Seahawk
- Wüst Seahawk prototype

General information
- Type: Amateur-built aircraft
- National origin: Germany
- Manufacturer: Wüst GmbH
- Status: Prototypes only flying (2011)

History
- First flight: 2003

The Wüst Seahawk is a German amateur-built flying boat under development by Wüst GmbH. The aircraft is intended to be supplied as a kit for amateur construction.

== Design and development ==
The Seahawk was originally the Mark Flugzeugbau Shark, but that company went out of business and Wüst continued development of the design.

The Seahawk features a cantilever shoulder-wing, a two-seats-in-side-by-side configuration enclosed cockpit, retractable tricycle landing gear and a single engine in pusher configuration, mounted in a pod above the wing.

The aircraft is made from composites. Its wing mounts downturned wing tips that incorporate floats for water operations. The standard engine used is the 115 hp (86 kW) Rotax 914 four-stroke turbocharged powerplant. The highly swept fin mounts the tailplane high, in a nearly T-tailed configuration. The hull incorporates a built-in step.

The aircraft prototype first flew on 29 March 2003, and a second prototype was completed. A third prototype was under construction in Africa in 2010. The company indicated that kit production would likely take place in the Czech Republic.

Since 2010 the company website has disappeared and development of the Seahawk may have ceased.

== Specifications (Seahawk) ==
Data from Bayerl and Jackson

General characteristics

- Crew: one
- Capacity: one passenger
- Length: 7.35 m (24 ft 1 in)
- Wingspan: 8.38 m (27 ft 6 in)
- Height: 2.65 m (8 ft 8 in)
- Empty weight: 350 kg (772 lb)
- Max takeoff weight: 549 kg (1,210 lb)
- Fuel capacity: 90 L (24 US gal; 20 imp gal)
- Powerplant: 1 × Rotax 914 four cylinder, liquid and air-cooled, four stroke turbocharged aircraft engine, 86 kW (115 hp)
