= Celier Xenon 4 =

Maltese autogyro

Xenon 4
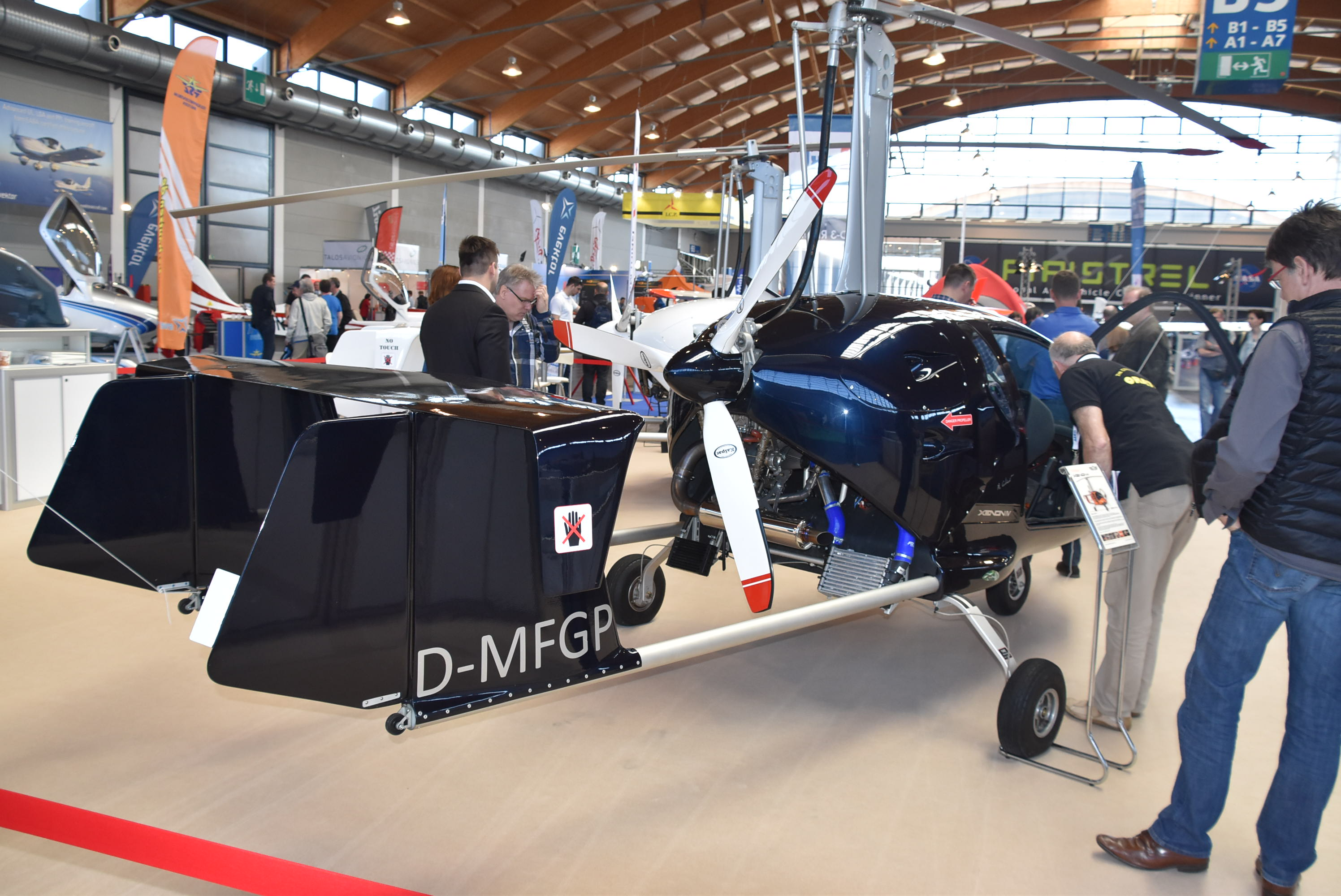

General information
- Type: Autogyro
- National origin: Malta
- Manufacturer: Celier Aviation
- Designer: Raphael Celier
- Status: In production (2017)

History
- Developed from: Celier Xenon 2

The Celier Xenon 4 (also referred to by the manufacturer as the Xenon IV) is a Maltese autogyro designed by Raphael Celier and produced by Celier Aviation of Safi, Malta. The aircraft is supplied complete and ready-to-fly.

== Design and development ==
The Xenon 4 is a development of the Celier Xenon 2 and Celier Xenon 3, with a newly designed fuselage and longer tailboom. It features a single main rotor, a two-seats-in side-by-side configuration enclosed cockpit, with some models offering a third seat. It has tricycle landing gear and a modified four cylinder, liquid and air-cooled, four stroke 135 hp (101 kW) turbocharged Rotax 912 engine in pusher configuration.

The fuselage is a monocoque made from carbon fiber reinforced polymer and features a cabin internal width of 130 cm (51 in). The two-bladed rotor has a diameter of 8.8 m (28.9 ft) and a chord of 20 cm (7.9 in). The aircraft has a typical empty weight of 295 kg (650 lb) and a maximum gross weight of 560 kg (1,235 lb), giving a useful load of 265 kg (584 lb). With full fuel of 85 litres (19 imp gal; 22 US gal) the payload for the pilot, passengers and baggage is 205 kg (452 lb).

== Variants ==
Xenon 4 Sport
Entry level civil model with two seats in side-by-side configuration and powered by a 100 hp (75 kW) Rotax 912S engine.
Xenon 4 XL
Mid level civil model with three seats in 1-2 configuration and powered by a 140 hp (104 kW) Rotax 912 ULS-T engine.
Xenon 4 Executive
Top level civil model with three seats in 1-2 configuration and powered by a 135 hp (101 kW) Rotax 912 ULS-T engine.
Xenon 4 Geo
Civil model equipped for the land survey and aerial photography roles, intended for the construction, mining and survey industries.
CA-22
Military model for medevac and other military roles. It is powered by a 135 hp (101 kW) Rotax 912 ULS-T engine.
C-22 VIP
Civil model for VIP transport.

== Specifications (Xenon 4 Executive) ==
Data from Tacke and product website

General characteristics

- Crew: one
- Capacity: two passengers
- Empty weight: 295 kg (650 lb)
- Gross weight: 560 kg (1,235 lb)
- Fuel capacity: 85 litres (19 imp gal; 22 US gal)
- Powerplant: 1 × Rotax 912ULS-T modified four cylinder, liquid and air-cooled, four stroke aircraft engine, 101 kW (135 hp)
- Main rotor diameter: 8.8 m (28 ft 10 in)
- Main rotor area: 61 m^{2} (660 sq ft)
- Propellers: 3-bladed composite

Performance

- Maximum speed: 195 km/h (121 mph, 105 kn)
- Cruise speed: 160 km/h (99 mph, 86 kn)
- Range: 640 km (400 mi, 350 nmi)
- Service ceiling: 5,500 m (18,000 ft)
- Rate of climb: 5.0 m/s (1,200 ft/min)
- Disk loading: 9.1 kg/m^{2} (1.9 lb/sq ft)
- Take-off run: 50–60 m (164–197 ft)
- Landing run: 0–5 m (0–16 ft)

== See also ==
- List of rotorcraft
