= Air Copter A3C =

French autogyro

A3C

General information
- Type: Autogyro
- National origin: France
- Manufacturer: Air Copter
- Status: In production (2011)

The Air Copter A3C is a French autogyro, designed and produced by Air Copter of Lherm, Haute-Garonne. The aircraft is supplied as a kit for amateur construction.

== Design and development ==
The A3C was designed to comply with amateur-built aircraft rules. It features a single main rotor, a two-seat side-by-side configuration enclosed cockpit with a windshield, tricycle landing gear and a four-cylinder, air and liquid-cooled, four-stroke, dual-ignition, turbocharged 115 hp (86 kW) Rotax 914 or a normally-aspirated 100 hp (75 kW) Rotax 912S engine mounted in pusher configuration.

Air Copter is well known as a designer and manufacturer of gyroplane rotor blades and other dynamic components and they also make their own components for the A3C. The aircraft's 8.40 m (27.6 ft) diameter rotor has a chord of 20 cm (7.9 in) and employs a NACA 8H12 airfoil. The main rotor has a pre-rotator to shorten take-off distance. The aircraft has an empty weight of 250 kg (550 lb) and a gross weight of 450 kg (990 lb), giving a useful load of 200 kg (440 lb).

== Specifications (A3C) ==
Data from Bayerl

General characteristics

- Crew: one
- Capacity: one passenger
- Airfoil: NACA 8H12
- Empty weight: 250 kg (551 lb)
- Gross weight: 450 kg (992 lb)
- Fuel capacity: 34 litres (7.5 imp gal; 9.0 US gal)
- Powerplant: 1 × Rotax 914 four cylinder, liquid and air-cooled, turbocharged, four stroke aircraft engine, 86 kW (115 hp)
- Main rotor diameter: 8.40 m (27 ft 7 in)
- Propellers: 3-bladed composite

Performance

- Maximum speed: 170 km/h (110 mph, 92 kn)
- Cruise speed: 140 km/h (87 mph, 76 kn)
- Rate of climb: 4 m/s (790 ft/min)
