= ELA 10 Eclipse =

Spanish gyroplane

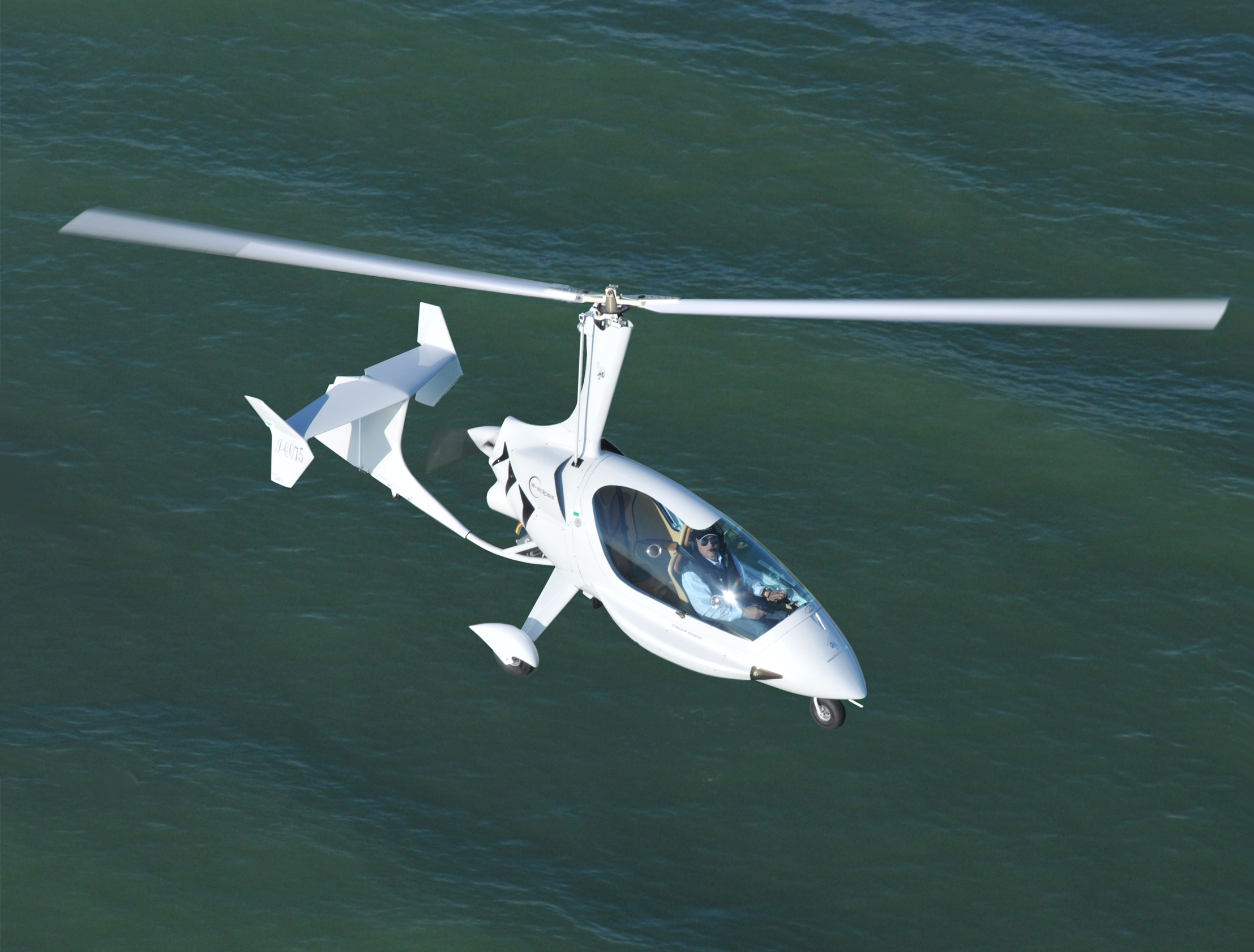

General information
- Type: Autogyro
- National origin: Spain
- Manufacturer: ELA Aviación
- Status: In Production (2017)

The ELA Aviation ELA 10 Eclipse is a Spanish, two-seat, enclosed autogyro, designed and built by ELA Aviación of Córdoba, Andalusia. It was introduced at the AERO Friedrichshafen airshow in 2014. The aircraft is supplied complete and ready-to-fly.

== Design and development ==
The ELA 10 Eclipse has a single main rotor, a two-seats-in tandem enclosed cockpit with a bubble canopy, tricycle landing gear with wheel pants, plus a tail caster and a four-cylinder, liquid and air-cooled, four stroke 100 hp (75 kW) Rotax 912 ULS or turbocharged 115 hp (86 kW) Rotax 914 engine in pusher configuration.

The aircraft fuselage is made from composites. Its two-bladed rotor has a diameter of 8.50 m (27.9 ft) and a chord of 22 cm (8.7 in). The aircraft has a typical empty weight of 275 kg (606 lb) and a gross weight of 530 kg (1,168 lb) with the Rotax 914 engine (530 kg (1,168 lb) with the Rotax 912 ULS engine), giving a useful load of 255 kg (562 lb). With full fuel of 100 litres (22 imp gal; 26 US gal) the payload for the pilot, passengers and baggage is 183 kg (403 lb).

== Specifications (ELA 10 Eclipse) ==
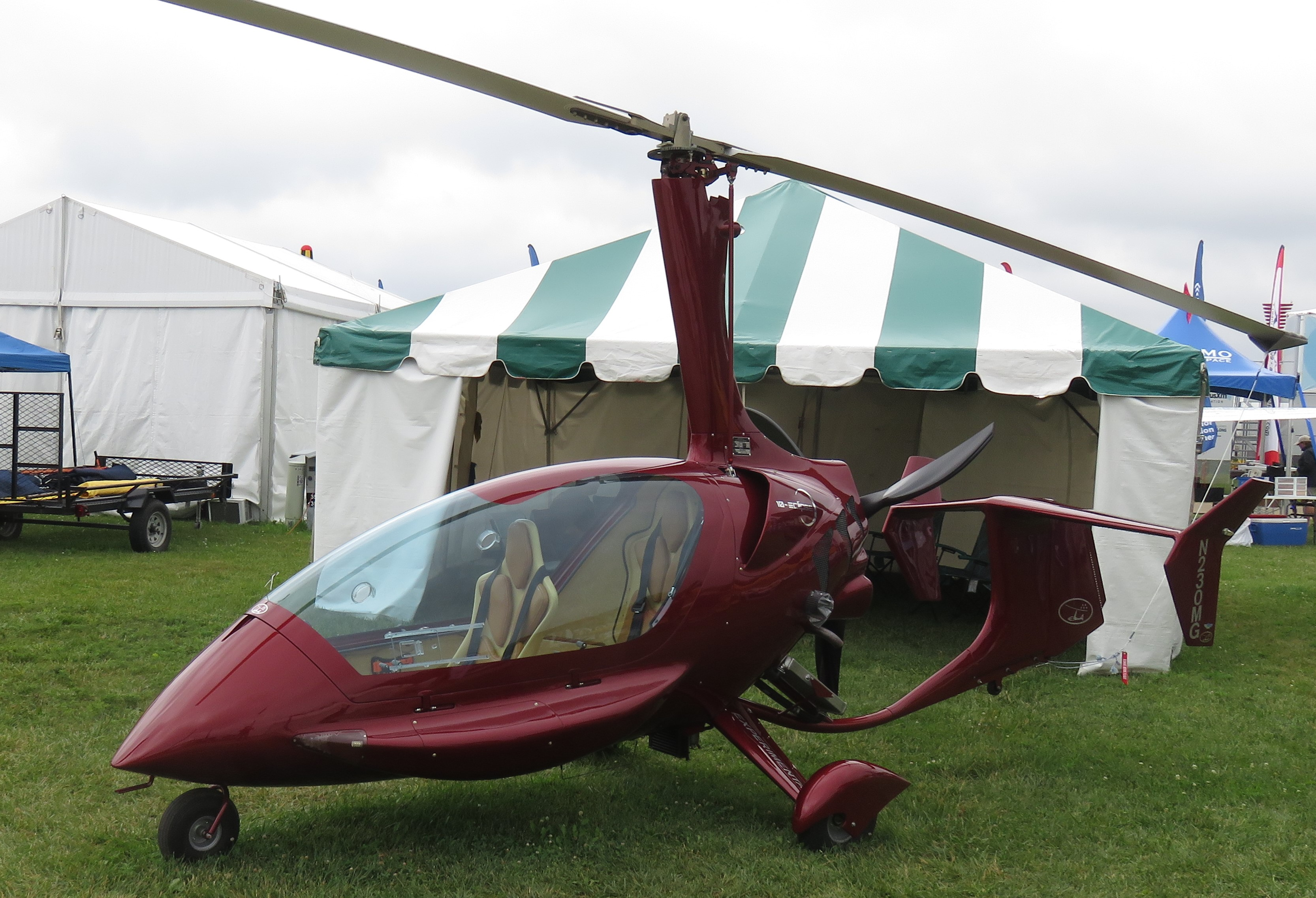
ELA 10 Eclipse

Data from Tacke

General characteristics

- Crew: one
- Capacity: one passenger
- Empty weight: 275 kg (606 lb)
- Gross weight: 530 kg (1,168 lb)
- Fuel capacity: 100 litres (22 imp gal; 26 US gal)
- Powerplant: 1 × Rotax 914 four cylinder, liquid and air-cooled, turbocharged four stroke aircraft engine, 86 kW (115 hp)
- Main rotor diameter: 8.50 m (27 ft 11 in)
- Main rotor area: 57 m^{2} (610 sq ft)
- Propellers: 3-bladed composite

Performance

- Maximum speed: 190 km/h (120 mph, 100 kn)
- Cruise speed: 160 km/h (99 mph, 86 kn)
- Rate of climb: 5 m/s (980 ft/min)
- Disk loading: 9.3 kg/m^{2} (1.9 lb/sq ft)

== See also ==
- List of rotorcraft
