= Bauer BAD-12 Gyrotrainer =

Czech autogyro

BAD-12 Gyrotrainer

General information
- Type: Autogyro
- National origin: Czech Republic
- Manufacturer: Bauer Avion
- Status: In production (2012)

The Bauer BAD-12 Gyrotrainer is a Czech autogyro, designed and produced by Bauer Avion of Prague. The aircraft is supplied as a complete ready-to-fly-aircraft.

== Design and development ==
The BAD-12 Gyrotrainer features a single main rotor, a two seats in tandem open cockpit with a windshield, tricycle landing gear with wheel pants, a triple tail and a four-cylinder, air and liquid-cooled, four-stroke, dual-ignition 100 hp (75 kW) Rotax 912ULS engine in pusher configuration. The turbocharged 115 hp (86 kW) Rotax 914 and Subaru EJ22 are optional engines.

The aircraft fuselage is made from tubing, while the cockpit fairing is composite. The main rotor has a diameter of Its 8.70 m (28.5 ft). The BAD-12 has an empty weight of 284 kg (626 lb) and a gross weight of 450 kg (990 lb), giving a useful load of 166 kg (366 lb). The tricycle landing gear is supplemented with a small tailwheel to prevent dragging the tail on take-off. The tailboom has a bend in it to permit the installation of larger and more efficient propellers.

== Variants ==
BAD-12 Gyrotrainer
Base open cockpit model.
BAD-12 Gyrotrainer C
Cabine model with a fully enclosed fairing.

== Specifications (BAD-12 Gyrotrainer) ==
Data from Bayerl

General characteristics

- Crew: one
- Capacity: one passenger
- Empty weight: 284 kg (626 lb)
- Gross weight: 450 kg (992 lb)
- Fuel capacity: 55 litres (12 imp gal; 15 US gal)
- Powerplant: 1 × Rotax 914 four cylinder, turbocharged, liquid and air-cooled, four stroke aircraft engine, 86 kW (115 hp)
- Main rotor diameter: 8.70 m (28 ft 7 in)
- Propellers: 2-bladed composite, ground adjustable

Performance

- Maximum speed: 160 km/h (99 mph, 86 kn)
- Cruise speed: 100 km/h (62 mph, 54 kn)
- Rate of climb: 3 m/s (590 ft/min)
