= ELA 09 Junior =

Spanish autogyro

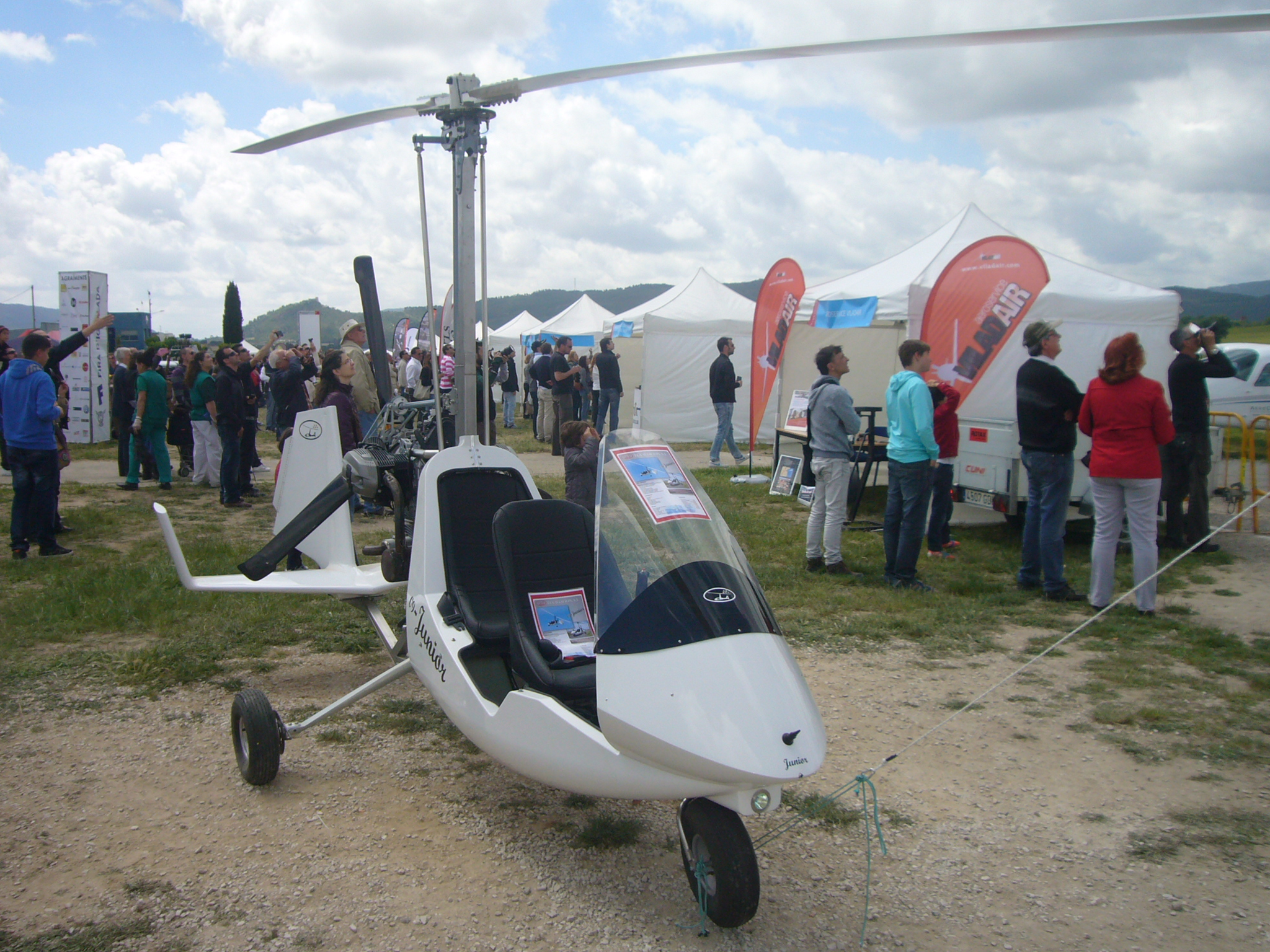

General information
- Type: Autogyro
- National origin: Spain
- Manufacturer: ELA Aviación
- Status: In production (2017)

The ELA 09 Junior is a Spanish autogyro designed and produced by ELA Aviación of Córdoba, Andalusia, introduced in the mid-2010s. The aircraft is supplied complete and ready-to-fly.

== Design and development ==
The 09 Junior was designed as an entry-level aircraft for pilots new to gyro flying. Reviewer Werner Pfaendler explains the choice of the aircraft's name and the marketing philosophy: "Junior refers to the target group (newcomer in the gyro aviation) and the price. It does not refer to technical components and instruments that comply with the high standards of the ELA senior gyros. For 35,000 Euros (ready-to-fly, no tax) customers get an excellent, sturdy gyro in plain white. Optional accessories include metallic paint (2,600 Euros), radio ATR 500 (1,500 Euros), or landing lights for 65 Euros and more."

The design features a single main rotor, a two-seats-in tandem open cockpit with a windshield, tricycle landing gear without wheel pants, plus a tail caster and a four-cylinder, liquid and air-cooled, four stroke 100 hp (75 kW) Rotax 912 ULS engine in pusher configuration.

The aircraft has a two-bladed rotor with a diameter of 8.25 m (27.1 ft) and a chord of 22 cm (8.7 in). The 09 Junior has a typical empty weight of 240 kg (529 lb) and a gross weight of 450 kg (992 lb), giving a useful load of 210 kg (463 lb). With full fuel of 45 litres (9.9 imp gal; 12 US gal) the payload for the pilot, passengers and baggage is 178 kg (392 lb).

== Specifications (09 Junior) ==
Data from Tacke

General characteristics

- Crew: one
- Capacity: one passenger
- Empty weight: 240 kg (529 lb)
- Gross weight: 450 kg (992 lb)
- Fuel capacity: 45 litres (9.9 imp gal; 12 US gal)
- Powerplant: 1 × Rotax 912 ULS four cylinder, liquid and air-cooled, four stroke aircraft engine, 75 kW (100 hp)
- Main rotor diameter: 8.25 m (27 ft 1 in)
- Main rotor area: 53 m^{2} (570 sq ft)
- Propellers: 3-bladed composite

Performance

- Maximum speed: 150 km/h (93 mph, 81 kn)
- Cruise speed: 120 km/h (75 mph, 65 kn)
- Rate of climb: 3.5 m/s (690 ft/min)
- Disk loading: 8.5 kg/m^{2} (1.7 lb/sq ft)

== See also ==
- List of rotorcraft
