= ELA Aviación =

Spanish aircraft manufacturer

ELA Aviación, SL
- Company type: Sociedad limitada
- Industry: Aerospace
- Founded: 1996
- Headquarters: Córdoba, Andalusia, Spain
- Products: autogyros
- Website: www.elaaviacion.com

ELA Aviación, SL (English: ELA Aviation, Limited) is a Spanish aircraft manufacturer based in Córdoba, Andalusia. The company specializes in the design and manufacture of autogyros in the form of ready-to-fly aircraft.

The company is a sociedad limitada (SL), a Spanish limited liability company.

The company was formed in 1996 and produces the open-cockpit ELA 07 series of autogyros, including the ELA 07 Agro agricultural aircraft, the ELA 07 Cougar for recreational touring use and the ELA 07S for flight training. The ELA 09 Junior is an entry-level open-cockpit autogyro, introduced in the mid-2010s. The company also produces an enclosed cockpit autogyro, the ELA 10 Eclipse.

== Aircraft ==
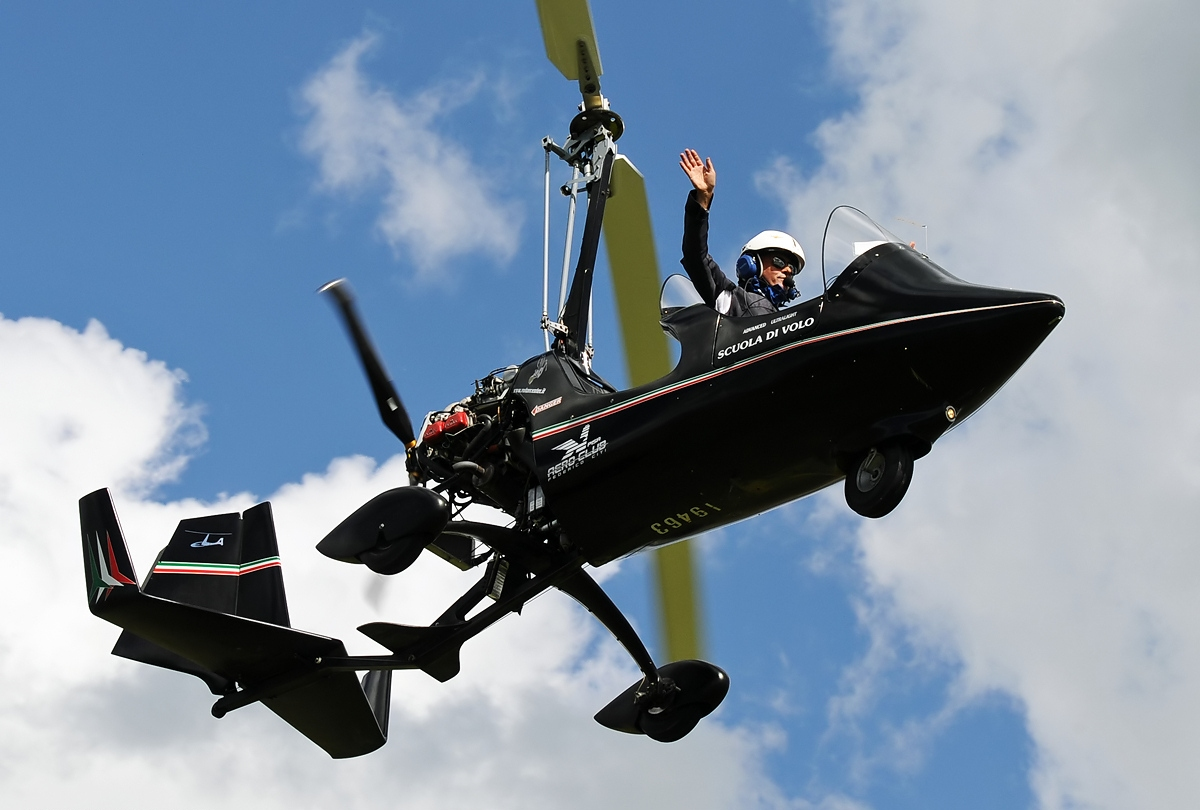
ELA 07 autogyro

Summary of aircraft built by ELA Aviación
Model name	First flight	Number built	Type
ELA 07			Two-seat open-cockpit autogyro
ELA 09 Junior			Two-seat open-cockpit autogyro
ELA 10 Eclipse			Two-seat enclosed-cockpit autogyro
