= Pagotto Brako =

Italian ultralight trike

Brako

General information
- Type: Ultralight trike
- National origin: Italy
- Manufacturer: Carpenterie Pagotto
- Designer: Enio Pagotto
- Status: In production (2013)

The Pagotto Brako is an Italian ultralight trike, designed by Enio Pagotto and produced by Carpenterie Pagotto of Pianzano. The aircraft is supplied as a complete ready-to-fly-aircraft.

== Design and development ==
The aircraft was designed to comply with the Fédération Aéronautique Internationale microlight category, including the category's maximum gross weight of 450 kg (992 lb). The aircraft has a maximum gross weight of 450 kg (992 lb). It features a cable-braced hang glider-style high wing, weight-shift controls, a two-seats-in-tandem open cockpit without a cockpit fairing, tricycle landing gear with wheel pants and a single engine in pusher configuration.

The aircraft is made from welded stainless steel tubing, with its single or double surface wing covered in Dacron sailcloth. The Brako is factory supplied only with Grif wings. With the Trainer wing it has a wingspan of 10.35 m (34.0 ft). The wing is supported by a single tube-type kingpost and uses an "A" frame weight-shift control bar. The powerplant is a twin-cylinder, air-cooled, two-stroke, dual-ignition 50 hp (37 kW) Rotax 503 engine, with a reconditioned four-cylinder, air- and liquid-cooled, four-stroke, dual-ignition 80 hp (60 kW) Rotax 912UL engine optional.

With the Rotax 503 engine and Grif Trainer wing the aircraft has an empty weight of 158 kg (348 lb) and a gross weight of 450 kg (992 lb), giving a useful load of 292 kg (644 lb). With full fuel of 42 litres (9.2 imp gal; 11 US gal) the payload is 261 kg (575 lb).

A number of different wings can be fitted to the basic carriage, including the beginner Grif Trainer, intermediate Grif Spyder and the higher performance Grif Corsair with wing areas of 12.8 m^{2} (138 sq ft) and 13.7 m^{2} (147 sq ft).

== Specifications (Brako with Grif Trainer wing) ==
Data from Bayerl

General characteristics

- Crew: one
- Capacity: one passenger
- Wingspan: 10.35 m (33 ft 11 in)
- Wing area: 16.0 m^{2} (172 sq ft)
- Empty weight: 158 kg (348 lb)
- Gross weight: 450 kg (992 lb)
- Fuel capacity: 42 litres (9.2 imp gal; 11 US gal)
- Powerplant: 1 × Rotax 503 twin-cylinder, air-cooled, two-stroke aircraft engine, 37 kW (50 hp)
- Propellers: three-bladed composite

Performance

- Maximum speed: 100 km/h (62 mph, 54 kn)
- Cruise speed: 75 km/h (47 mph, 40 kn)
- Stall speed: 45 km/h (28 mph, 24 kn)
- Rate of climb: 2.8 m/s (550 ft/min)
- Wing loading: 28.1 kg/m^{2} (5.8 lb/sq ft)
