= Celier Xenon 2 =

Polish autogyro

Xenon 2
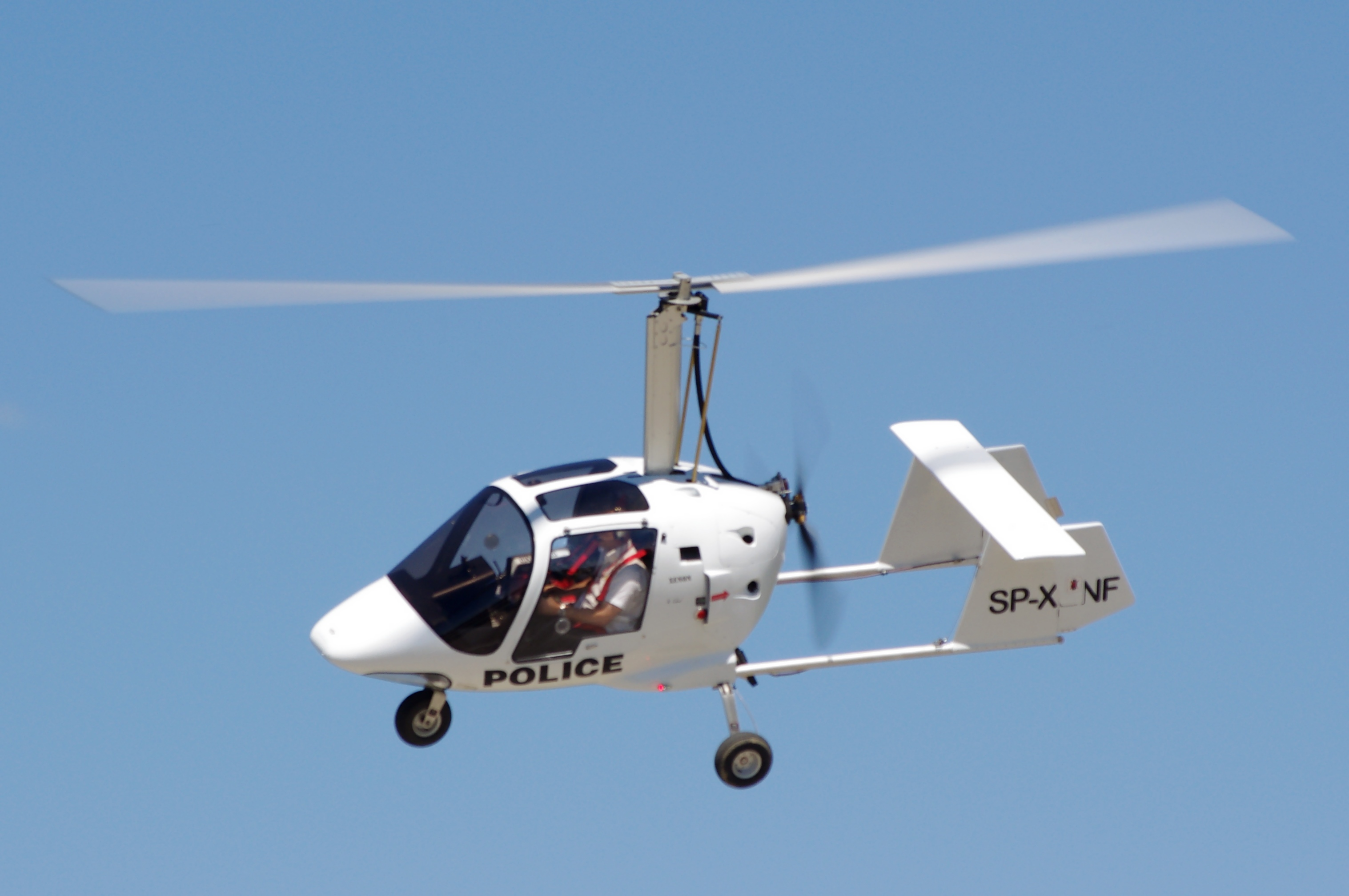

General information
- Type: Autogyro
- National origin: Poland
- Manufacturer: Celier Aviation
- Designer: Raphael Celier
- Status: Production completed
- Number built: 100 (2011)

The Celier Xenon 2 (also referred to by the manufacturer as the Xenon II) is a series of Polish autogyros that was designed by Frenchman Raphael Celier and produced by his company, Celier Aviation of Piotrków Trybunalski, Poland. The aircraft is supplied as a kit for amateur construction or as a complete ready-to-fly-aircraft.

Production of the Xenon 2 has ended and only the Celier Xenon 4 model remained in production is 2017.

== Design and development ==
The side-by-side configuration Xenon 2 complements the tandem seat Celier Kiss series of autogyros. The Xenon 2 series all feature a single main rotor, tricycle landing gear, a low-set twin-boom T-tail, a fully enclosed two seat cockpit and a choice of engines, all mounted in pusher configuration.

One hundred Xenon 2s had been completed by 2011. The design has been developed into the three seat Celier Xenon 3 and Xenon 4.

== Variants ==
Xenon 2 RT
Turbocharged model, powered by a four cylinder, air and liquid-cooled, four-stroke, dual-ignition 115 hp (86 kW) Rotax 914 engine in pusher configuration.
Xenon 2R Eco
Model powered by a four cylinder, air and liquid-cooled, four-stroke, dual-ignition 100 hp (75 kW) Rotax 912ULS engine in pusher configuration.
Xenon 2 Executive
Upgraded turbocharged model, powered by a four cylinder, air and liquid-cooled, four-stroke, dual-ignition 135 hp (101 kW) Rotax 914 engine in pusher configuration. The aircraft has many upgrades and optional equipment as standard, including a Mitsubishi turbocharger that boosts the engine power output.
Xenon 3
Development version
Xenon 4
Further refined three-seat version

== Specifications (Xenon 2 RT) ==
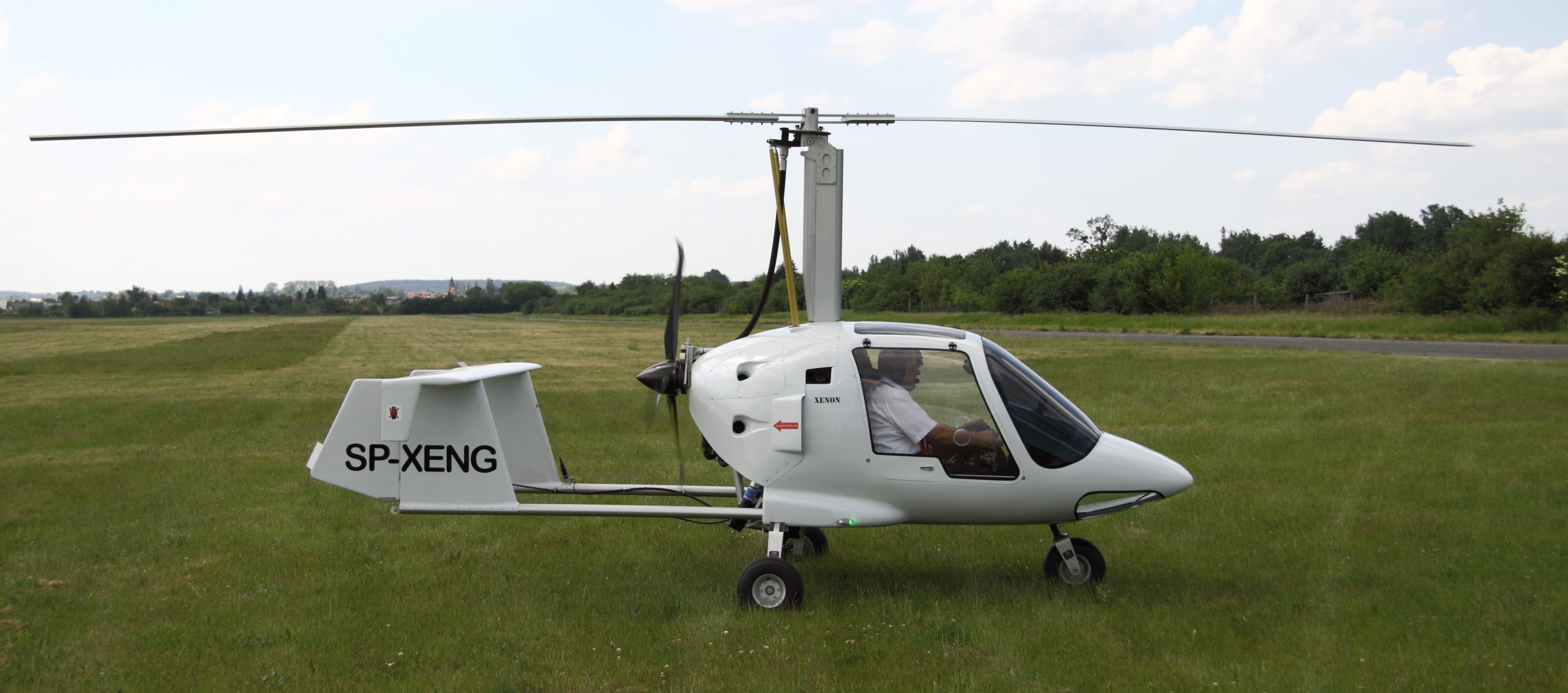
Celier Xenon 2

Data from Bayerl

General characteristics

- Crew: one
- Capacity: one passenger
- Empty weight: 285 kg (628 lb)
- Gross weight: 450 kg (992 lb)
- Fuel capacity: 85 litres (19 imp gal; 22 US gal)
- Powerplant: 1 × Rotax 914 four cylinder, liquid and air-cooled, four stroke turbocharged aircraft engine, 86 kW (115 hp)
- Main rotor diameter: 8.4 m (27 ft 7 in)
- Main rotor area: 55.4 m^{2} (596 sq ft)

Performance

- Maximum speed: 195 km/h (121 mph, 105 kn)
- Cruise speed: 160 km/h (99 mph, 86 kn)
- Rate of climb: 8 m/s (1,600 ft/min)
