= Aerospool WT10 Advantic =

Slovakian light aircraft

WT10 Advantic
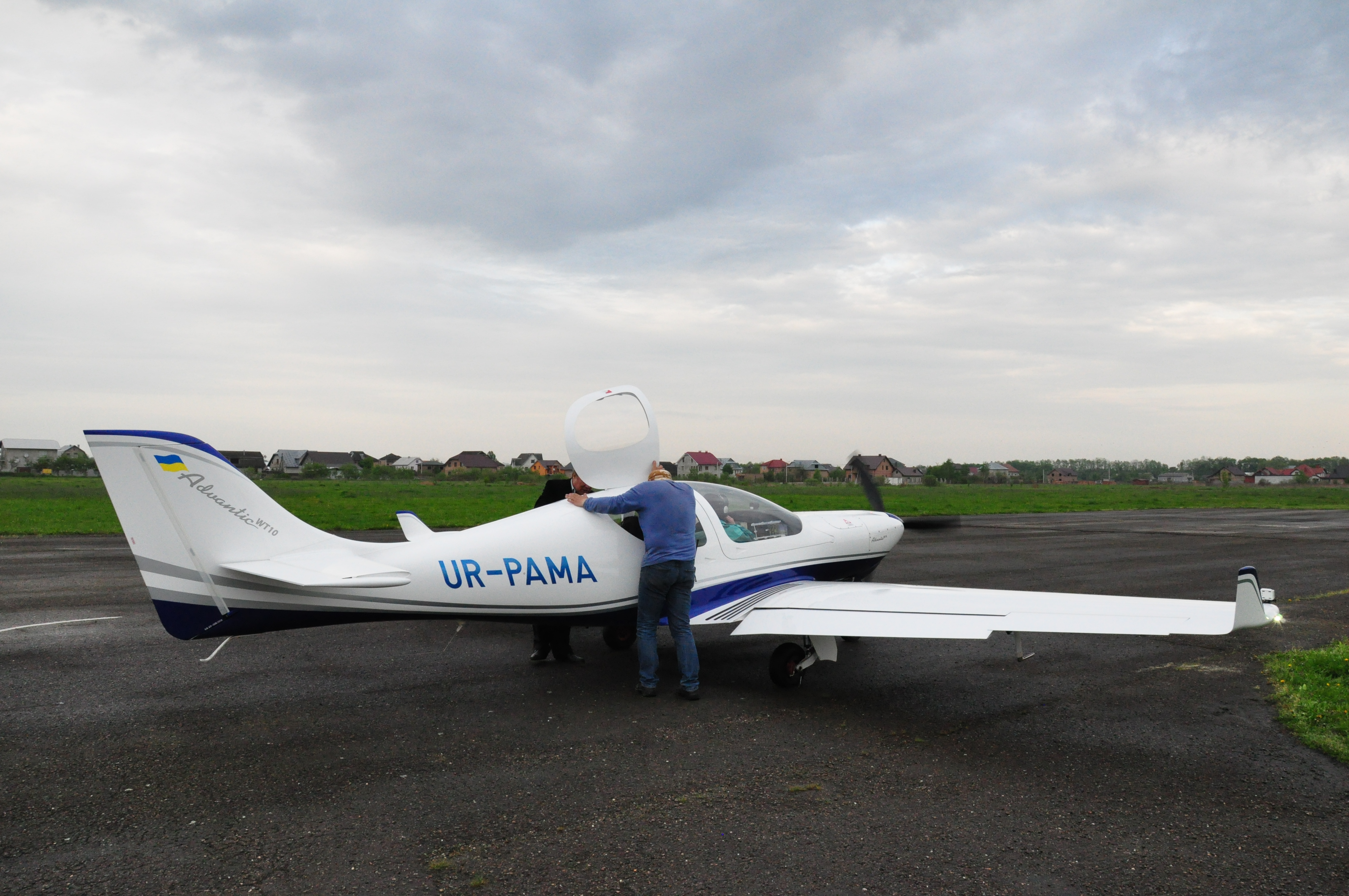

General information
- Type: Amateur-built aircraft
- National origin: Slovakia
- Manufacturer: Aerospool
- Status: Under development (2015)

History
- Manufactured: 2015-present
- First flight: 11 April 2013
- Developed from: Aerospool WT9 Dynamic

The Aerospool WT10 Advantic is a Slovak amateur-built aircraft, designed and being developed by Aerospool of Prievidza, introduced at the AERO Friedrichshafen show in 2013. The aircraft is intended to be supplied as a kit for amateur construction.

== Design and development ==
The WT10 Advantic is a development of the commercially successful two-seat Aerospool WT9 Dynamic. The WT10 features a cantilever low-wing, a three to four-seat enclosed cockpit under a forward-hinged bubble canopy, plus a rear seat access hatch, retractable tricycle landing gear and a single engine in tractor configuration.

The WT10 is made from composite materials. Its 9.4 m (30.8 ft) span wing has an area of 10.61 m^{2} (114.2 sq ft) and mounts flaps. The prototype used a 115 hp (86 kW) Rotax 914 turbocharged four-stroke powerplant, driving an MT-Propeller. The gross take off weight will be 750 kg (1,653 lb) for the three seat configuration and 850 kg (1,874 lb) for the four seat configuration.

The aircraft was first flown on 11 April 2013. As of March 2017 it was still indicated on the manufacturer's website as under development.

== Specifications (WT10 Advantic) ==
Data from Tacke

General characteristics

- Crew: one
- Capacity: three passengers
- Wingspan: 9.4 m (30 ft 10 in)
- Wing area: 10.61 m^{2} (114.2 sq ft)
- Gross weight: 850 kg (1,874 lb)
- Fuel capacity: 126 litres (28 imp gal; 33 US gal)
- Powerplant: 1 × Rotax 914 turbocharged four cylinder, liquid and air-cooled, four stroke aircraft engine, 86 kW (115 hp)
- Propellers: 3-bladed MT-Propeller

Performance

- Maximum speed: 250.0 km/h (155.3 mph, 135.0 kn)
- Cruise speed: 210 km/h (130 mph, 110 kn)
- Stall speed: 88 km/h (55 mph, 48 kn)
- Rate of climb: 3.75 m/s (738 ft/min)
- Wing loading: 80.1 kg/m^{2} (16.4 lb/sq ft)
