= Carpenterie Pagotto =

Italian aircraft manufacturer

Carpenterie Pagotto Srl
- Company type: Privately held company
- Industry: Aerospace
- Founded: 1961
- Founder: Enio Pagotto
- Headquarters: Pianzano, Italy
- Products: Autogyros and ultralight trikes
- Website: www.carpenteriepagotto.it

Carpenterie Pagotto Srl (English: Pagotto Structures Limited), also sometimes called Pagotto Carpenterie, is an Italian aircraft manufacturer based in Pianzano. The company was founded in 1961 by designer Enio Pagotto and specializes in the design and manufacture of autogyros and ultralight trikes.

Pagotto established his company initially to produce trikes and built his reputation on them, he then expanded into autogyro design.

== Aircraft ==
Summary of aircraft built by Carpenterie Pagotto
Model name	First flight	Number built	Type
Pagotto Brako			Two seat ultralight trike
Pagotto Brakogyro			Two seat autogyro
