= Pagotto Brakogyro =

Italian autogyro

Brakogyro
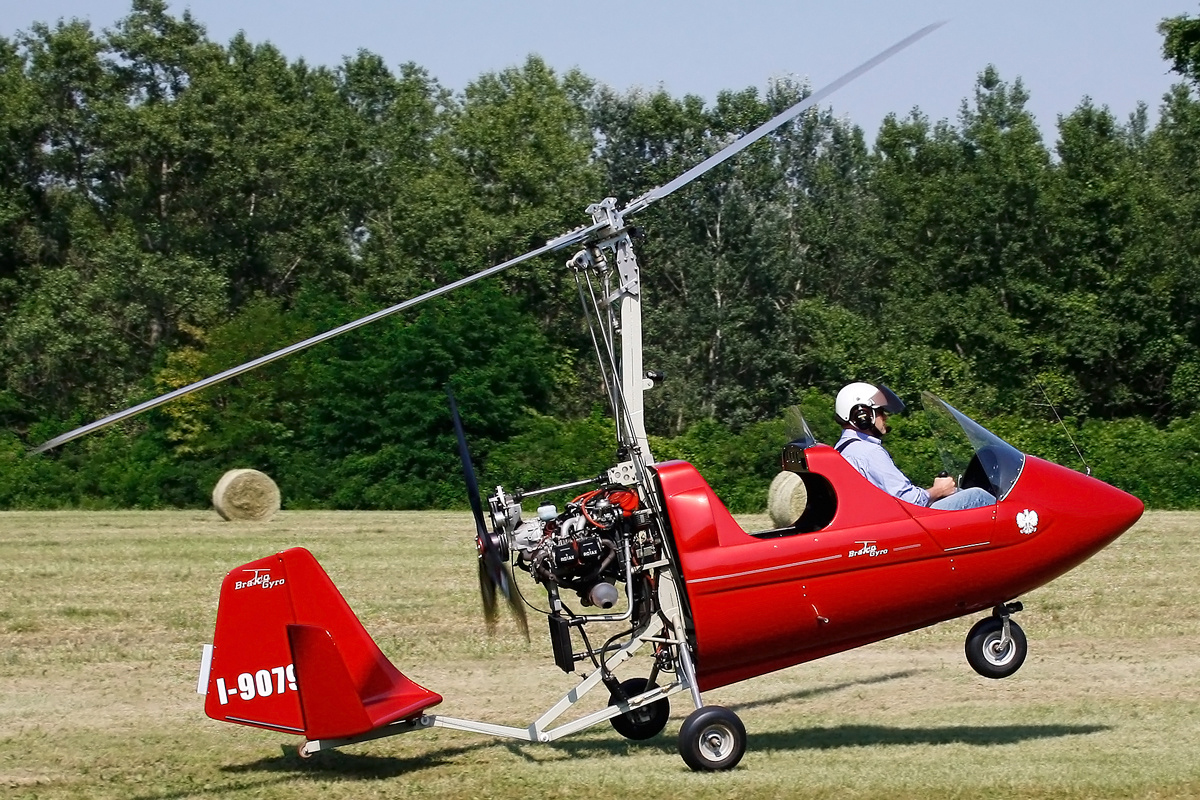
- Pagotto Brakogyro GT during landing

General information
- Type: Autogyro
- National origin: Italy
- Manufacturer: Carpenterie Pagotto
- Designer: Enio Pagotto
- Status: In production (2013)

The Pagotto Brakogyro is a series of Italian autogyros, designed by Enio Pagotto and produced by Carpenterie Pagotto of Pianzano. The aircraft is supplied as a complete ready-to-fly-aircraft.

== Design and development ==
The Brakogyro features a single main rotor, an open cockpit with a windshield with two seats in tandem, tricycle landing gear with wheel pants and a four-cylinder, air- and liquid-cooled, four-stroke, dual-ignition Rotax 912S engine with a custom-designed turbocharger that produces 122 hp (91 kW), mounted in pusher configuration. The 115 hp (86 kW) turbocharged Rotax 914 powerplant is also available, but at higher cost.

The aircraft fuselage is made from welded stainless steel tubing, with a non-structural composite cockpit fairing. Its 8.53 m (28.0 ft) diameter Averso rotor has a chord of 21.3 cm (8.4 in). The aircraft has a triple tail mounted on the tail boom tube.

== Variants ==
Brakogyro GT
Model with composite cockpit fairing. The Brakogyro GT has an empty weight of 265 kg (584 lb) and a gross weight of 450 kg (992 lb), giving a useful load of 185 kg (408 lb).
NAKEd
Open model without the cockpit fairing, but fitted with a single rollbar and skids in front of the main landing gear. The NAKEd has an empty weight of 248 kg (547 lb) and a gross weight of 450 kg (992 lb), giving a useful load of 202 kg (445 lb), 17 kg (37 lb) more than the Brakogyro GT.

== Specifications (Brakogyro GT) ==
Data from Bayerl

General characteristics

- Crew: one
- Capacity: one passenger
- Empty weight: 265 kg (584 lb)
- Gross weight: 450 kg (992 lb)
- Fuel capacity: 80 litres (18 imp gal; 21 US gal)
- Powerplant: 1 × Rotax 912ULS Turbo four cylinder, liquid and air-cooled, four stroke aircraft engine, fitted with a Pagotto-designed turbocharger, 91 kW (122 hp)
- Main rotor diameter: 8.53 m (28 ft 0 in)
- Propellers: 3-bladed compostire

Performance

- Maximum speed: 195 km/h (121 mph, 105 kn)
- Cruise speed: 150 km/h (93 mph, 81 kn)
- Rate of climb: 5 m/s (980 ft/min)
