= Kozomín =

- Municipality
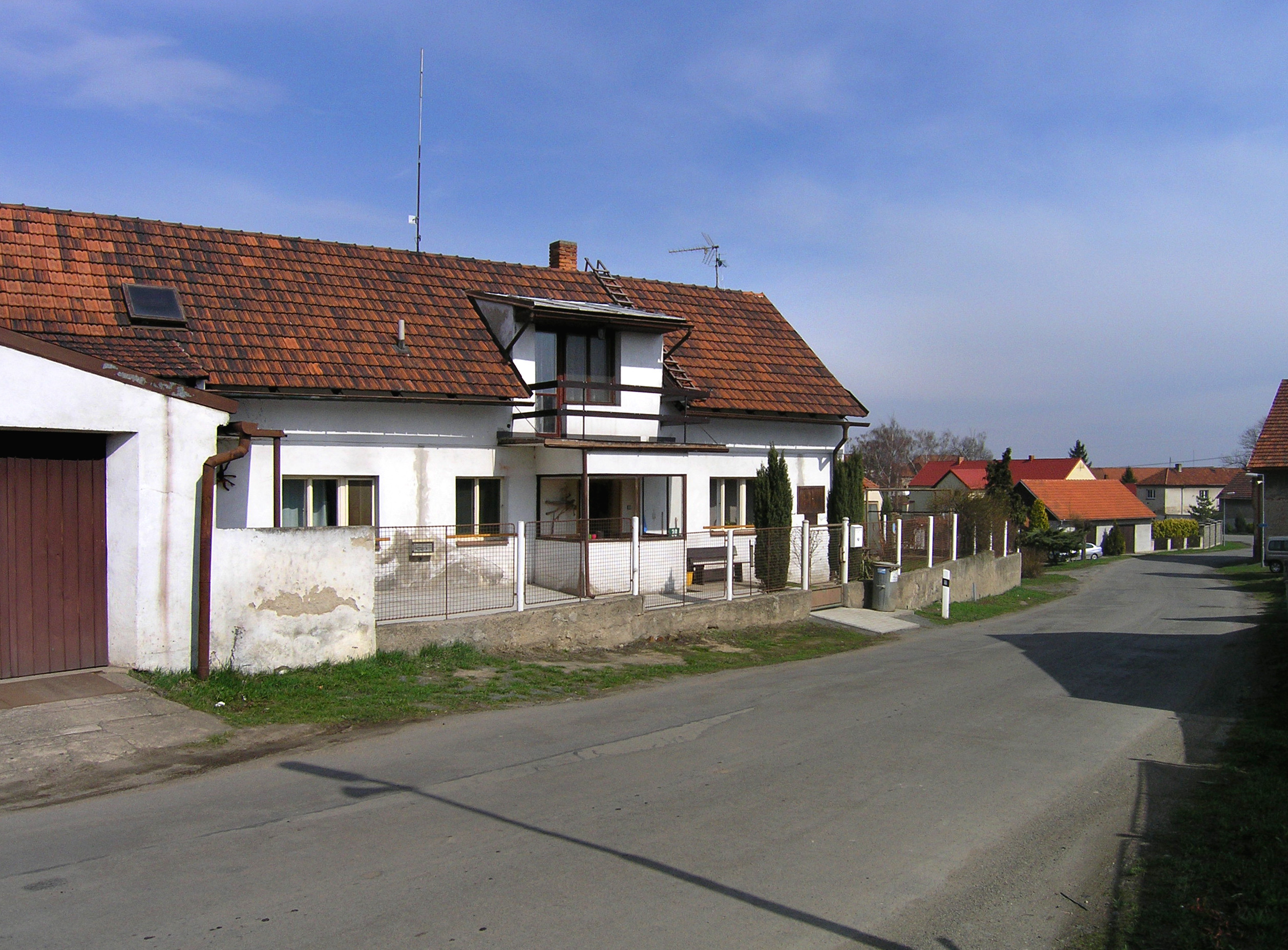
- Main street

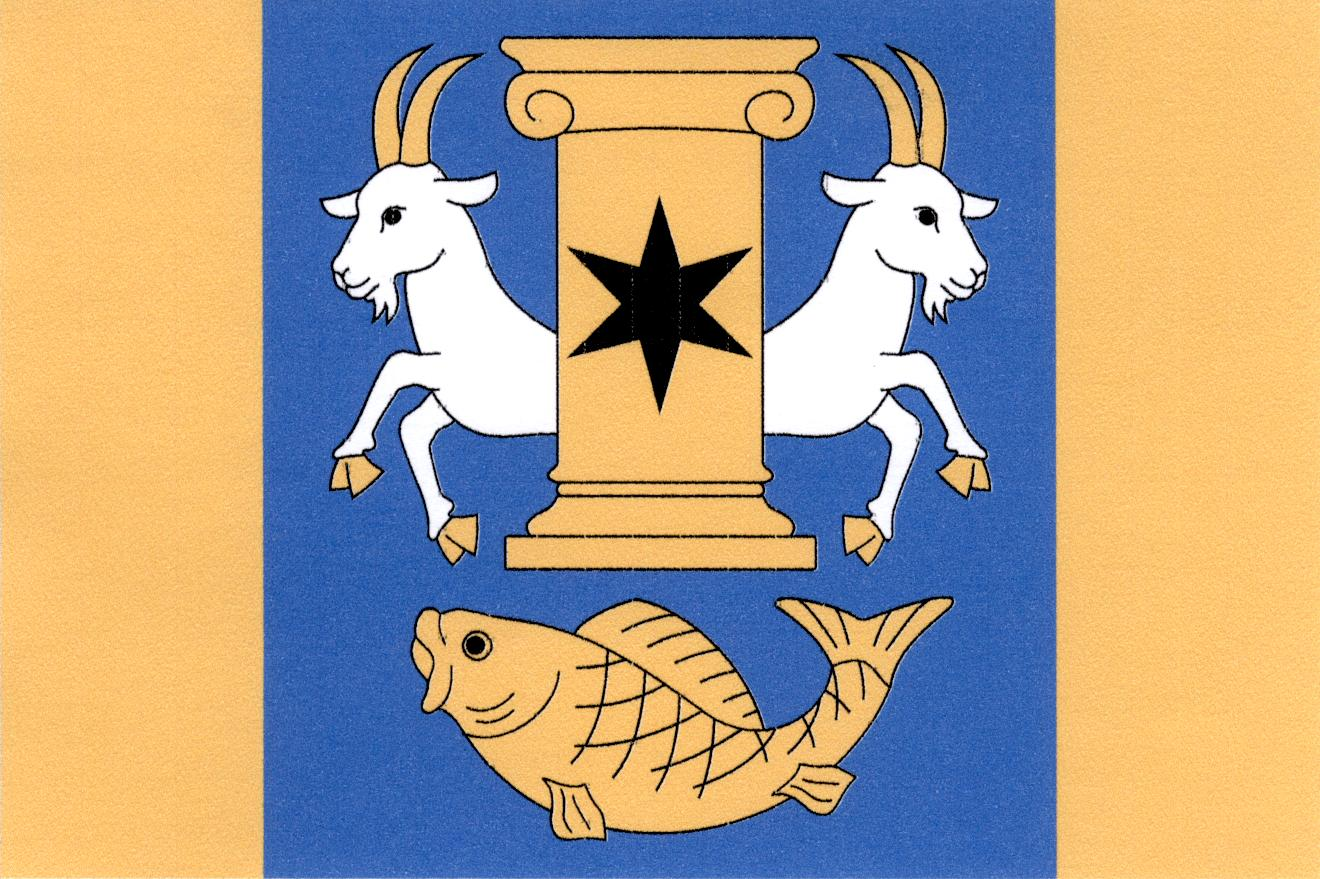
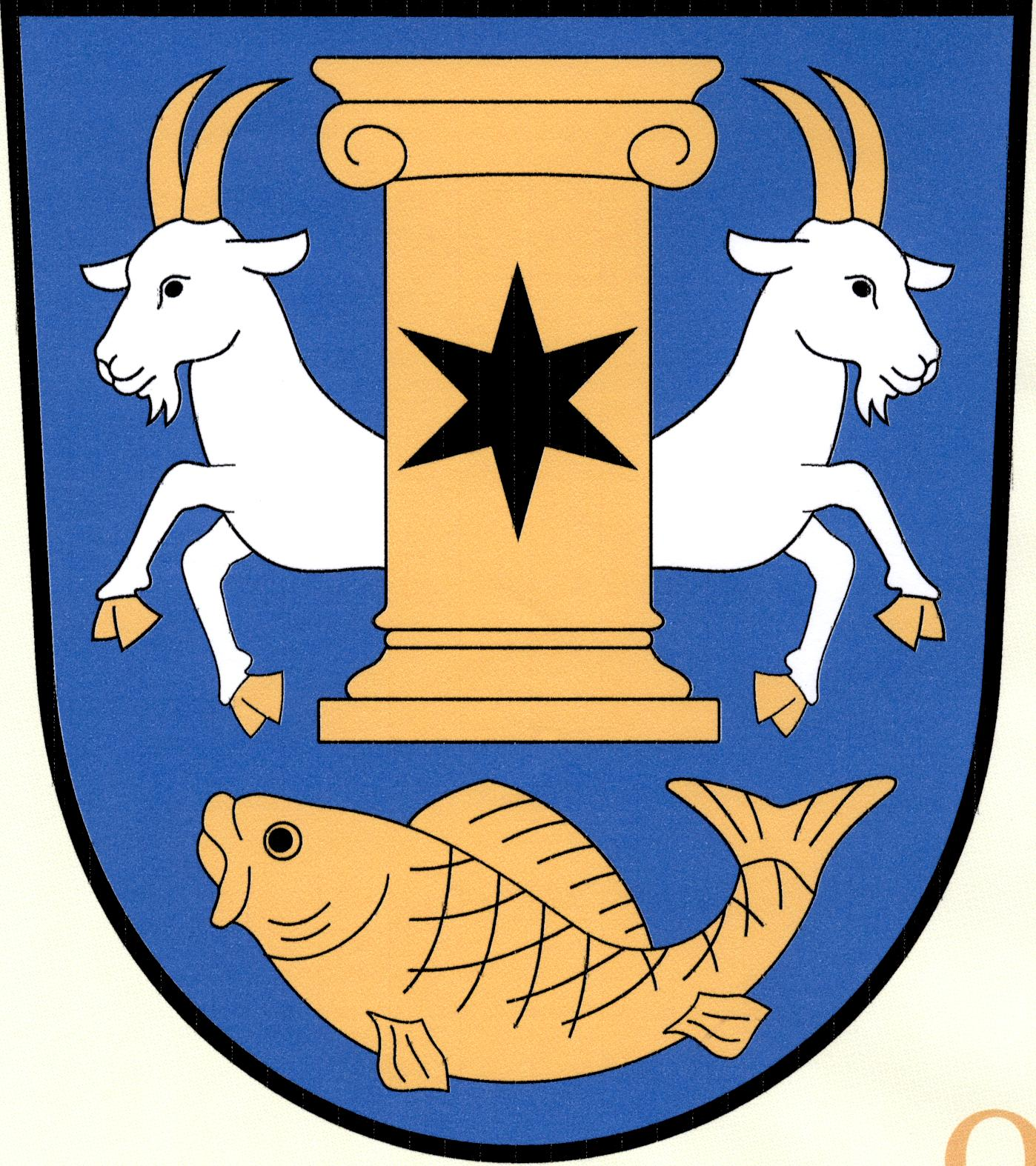
- Flag Coat of arms

- Location in the Czech Republic
- Coordinates: 50°14′13″N 14°22′16″E
- Country: Czech Republic
- Region: Central Bohemian
- District: Mělník
- First mentioned: 1400

Area
  - Total: 2.72 km^{2} (1.05 sq mi)
- Elevation: 265 m (869 ft)

Population (2026-01-01)
  - Total: 496
  - Density: 182/km^{2} (472/sq mi)
- Time zone: UTC+1 (CET)
  - Summer (DST): UTC+2 (CEST)
- Postal code: 277 45
- Website: www.kozomin.cz

Kozomín is a municipality and village in Mělník District in the Central Bohemian Region of the Czech Republic. It has about 500 inhabitants.

== History ==
The first written mention of Kozomín is from 1400.

== Demographics ==
Historical population
Year	Pop.	±%
1869	286	—
1880	318	+11.2%
1890	287	−9.7%
1900	374	+30.3%
1910	394	+5.3%
1921	405	+2.8%
1930	463	+14.3%
1950	342	−26.1%
1961	368	+7.6%
1970	377	+2.4%
1980	325	−13.8%
1991	284	−12.6%
2001	264	−7.0%
2011	426	+61.4%
2021	472	+10.8%
Source: Censuses
