= Jaktorów-Kolonia =

- Village
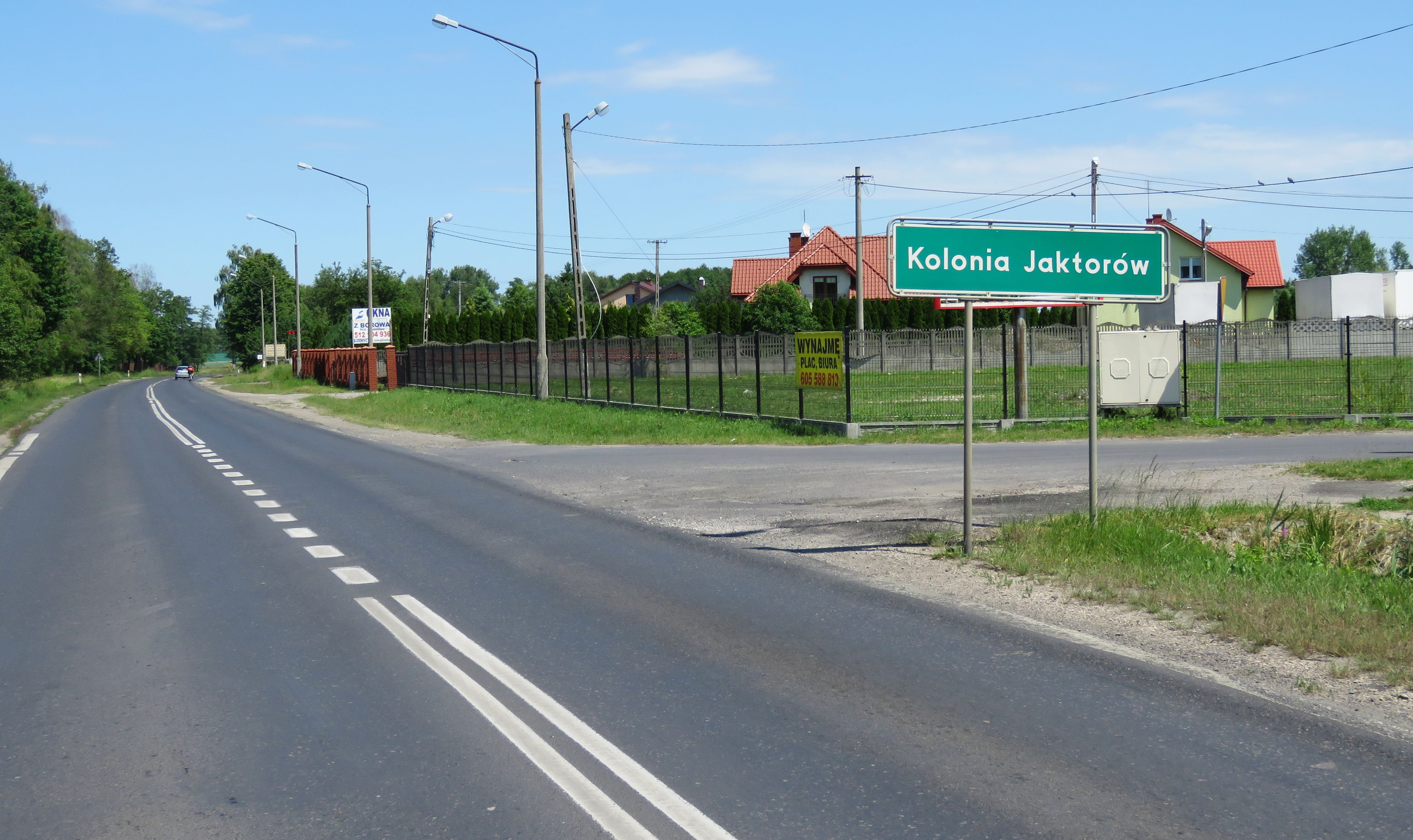

- Location within Poland
- Coordinates: 52°5′N 20°31′E
- Country: Poland
- Voivodeship: Masovian
- County: Grodzisk
- Gmina: Jaktorów
- Population: 600

Jaktorów-Kolonia [jakˈtɔruf kɔˈlɔɲa] is a village in the administrative district of Gmina Jaktorów, within Grodzisk County, Masovian Voivodeship, in east-central Poland.
