= Asso Aerei =

Italian range of light homebuilt aircraft

Asso Aerei Srl (English: Ace Aircraft Limited) was an Italian designer of light and ultralight aircraft founded by Giuseppe (Bepi) Vidor. Vidor (died 23 September 2013, aged 72) was a carpenter who studied engineering at night school, and all his aircraft are wooden designs, most with tricycle landing gear. The aircraft are homebuilt from plans or from very basic kits. The name Vidor Asso is also used.

== Aircraft ==
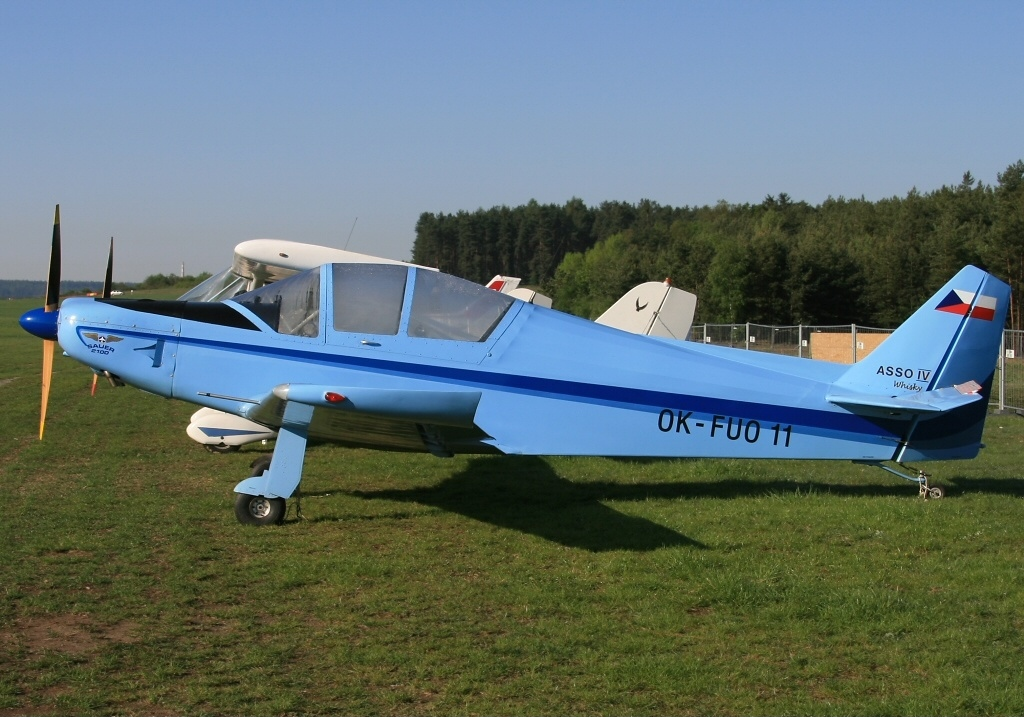
Asso IV Whisky OK-FUO 11

Asso I
Side-by-side 2-seat taildragger built by Vidor based on the Piel Super Emeraude – one built 1980. It is also known as RD 95, after Vidor's friend and advisor, Robert Denize, who had collaborated with Claude Piel. Another, built by Vidor, first flew in 1984.
Asso II
Four seater, also known as RD 30V, never flown because of the introduction of an Italian luxury tax based on aircraft weight.

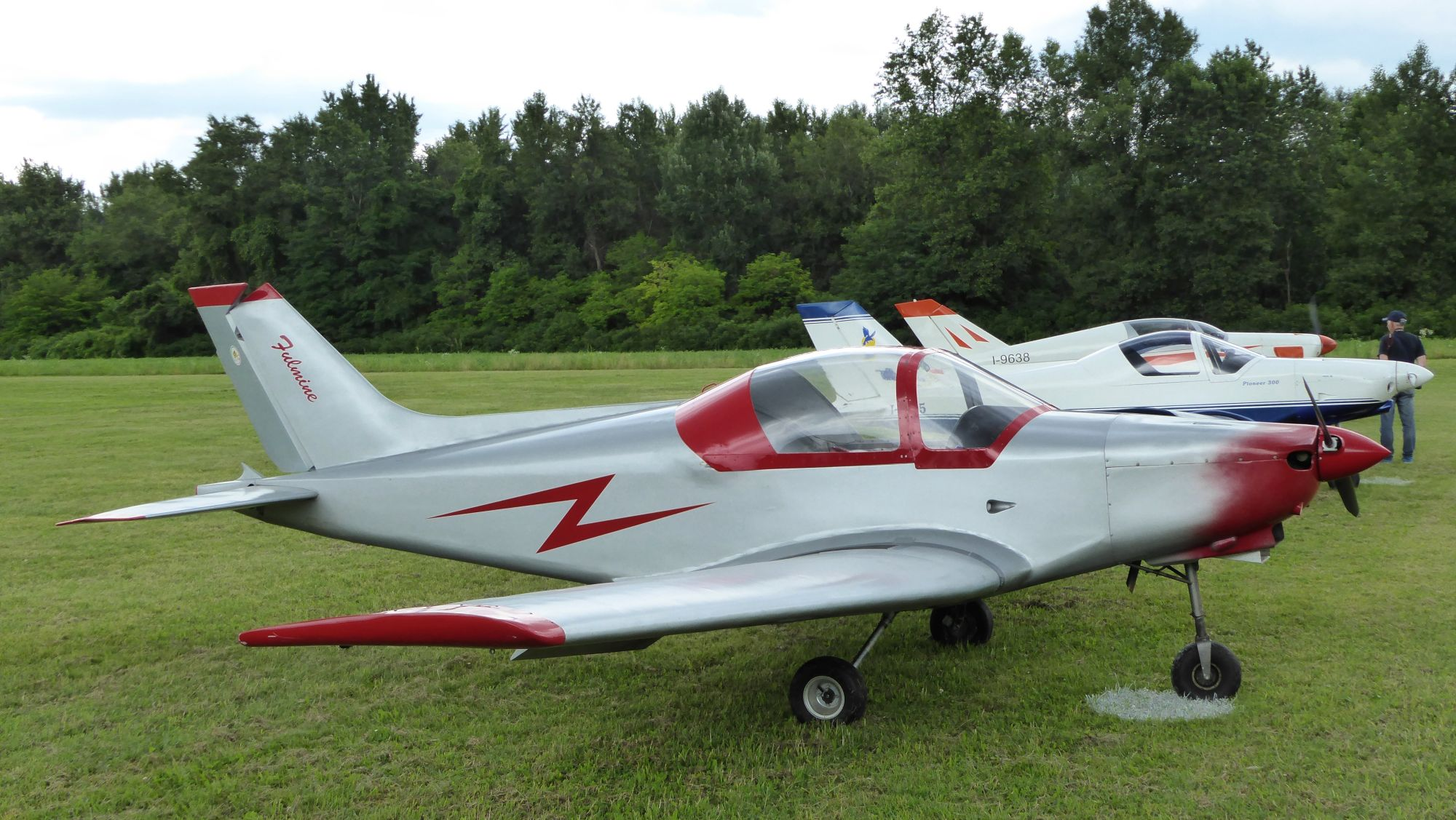
Asso V Champion I-7490

Asso III
Ultralight to avoid the luxury tax, based on the Asso I, but much lighter. Many kits sold.
Asso IV Whisky
2-seat tandem taildragger with fixed or retractable maingear. (Also known as Aerostar?)
Asso V Champion
2-seat side-by-side, fixed or retractable gear (1995). Built by Alpi Aviation with composite skin panels as the Pioneer 300.

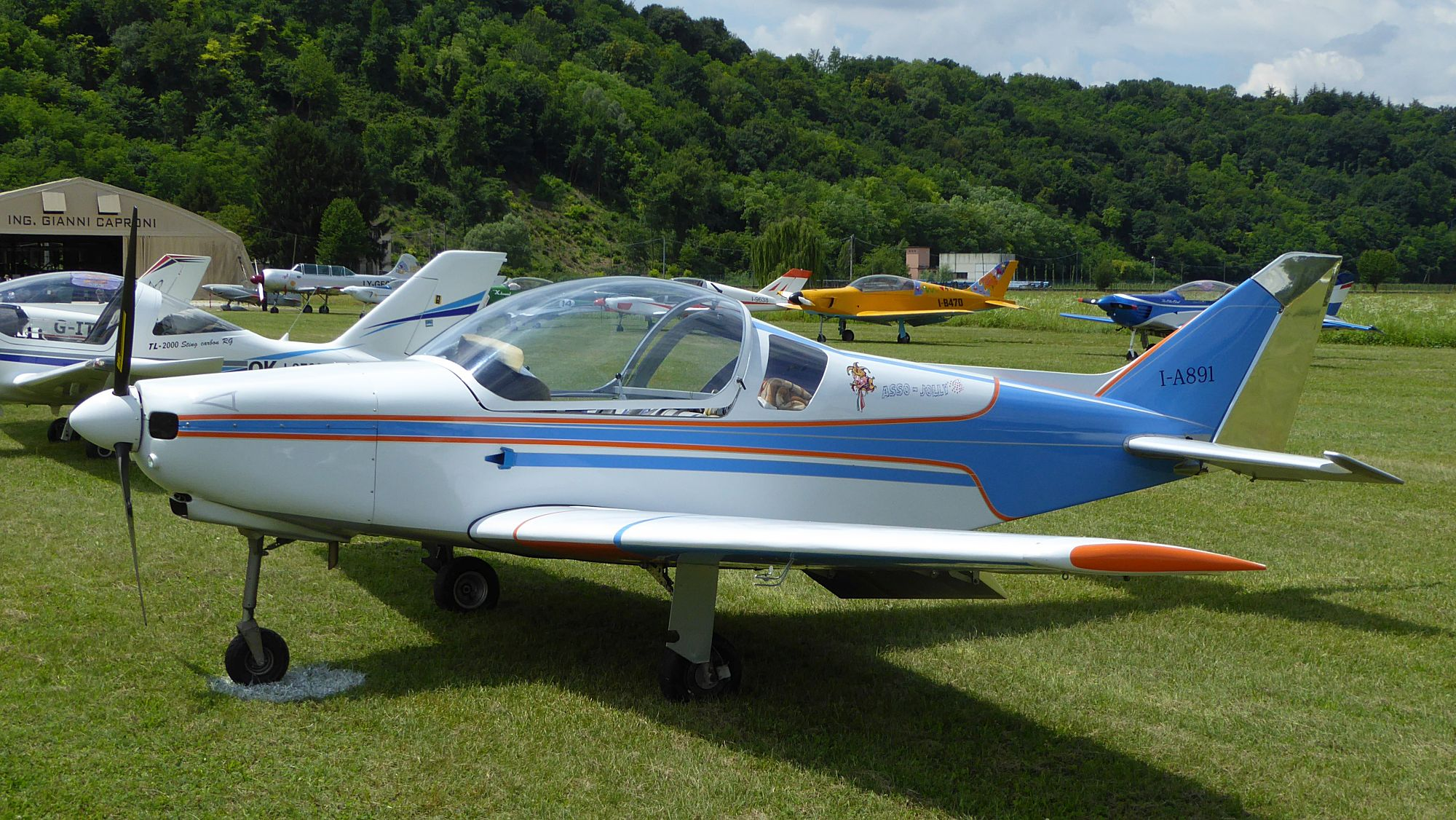
Asso V Jolly I-A891

Asso V Jolly
Lower-power version of the V Champion.
Asso V X-Ray
Side-by-side version of the IX Warrior.

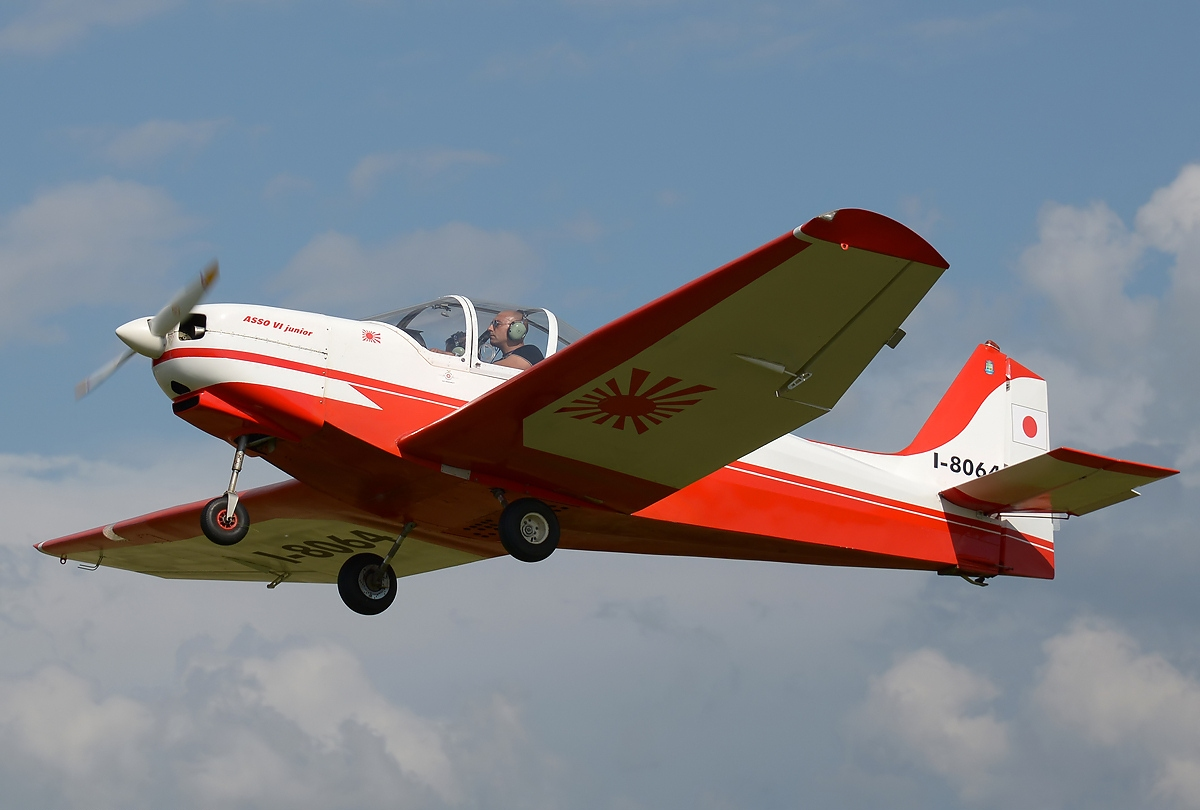
Asso VI Junior I-8064

Asso VI Junior
A simplified III, fixed gear, plus a glider version with greater wingspan.
Asso VI Evolution
Development of the Junior, with reduced wingspan, flaps and sliding canopy.
Asso VII
Asso VIII Centauro
Fiat G.55 scale replica based on the IV Whisky.
Asso IX Warrior
2-seat tandem RG aerobatic tourer.

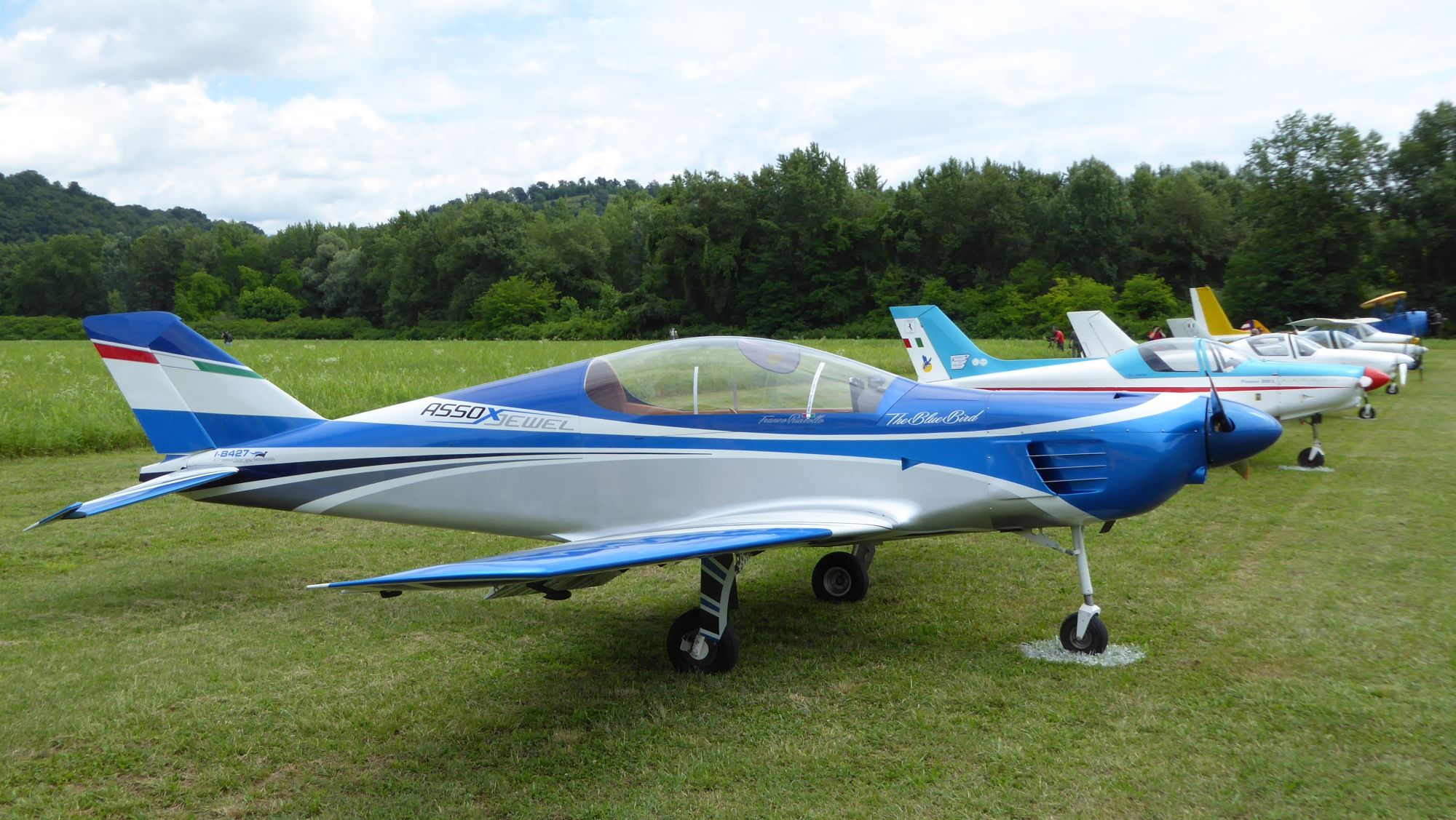
Asso X Jewel I-B427

Asso X Jewel
Laminar flow wing tandem 2-seater development of the V Champion. Developed into the all-composite Millennium Master (2006), which evolved into the Blackshape Prime (2007) and the Pelegrin Tarragon.
Asso XI Sprint
Production version of the VI Junior with steel tube fuselage (2003).
Asso XIV Spitfire
Supermarine Spitfire scale replica based on the IV Whisky.
Asso XV Sword
2-seat side-by-side RG tourer.

== Uncompleted projects ==
Asso XVI
Tandem 2-seater with pusher engine at the rear.
Asso XVIB
Twin-Wankel engines driving a single propeller.
Asso XVII
Side-by-side version of the X Jewel.
Asso XVIIB
Side-by-side version of the X Jewel.
