= Alpi Pioneer 400 =

Italian light aircraft

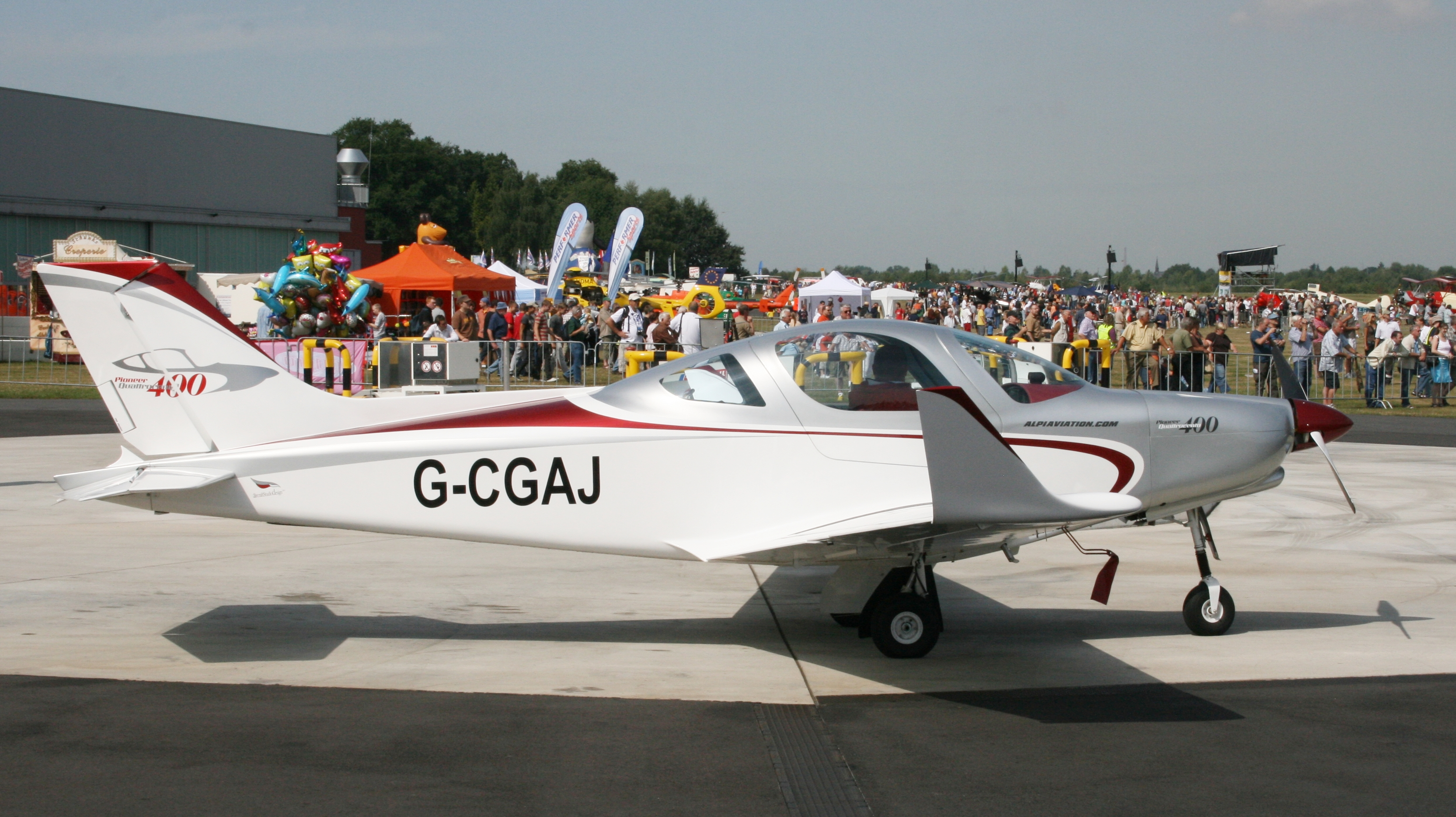

General information
- Type: Fixed wing single engine
- National origin: Italy
- Manufacturer: Alpi Aviation
- Status: In production
- Number built: 54 by October 2024

History
- First flight: Early 2013
- Developed from: Alpi Pioneer 200, Alpi Pioneer 300

The Alpi Pioneer 400 is an Italian four-seat light aircraft, designed produced by Alpi Aviation, of Pordenone. The aircraft is supplied as a kit for amateur construction or as a complete ready-to-fly-aircraft.

== Design ==
The Alpi Pioneer series of light aircraft, 200, 300 are developments of the Vidor Champion V or Asso V, designed by Giuseppe Vidor and renamed Pioneer. The Pioneer 400, developed in the following years by the company, is the largest (4 seater). Quattrocento (four hundred) is often included in the name.

The Pioneer 400 is a low wing monoplane, with a trapezoidal plan wing that has sweep only on the trailing edge and winglets at its tips. The wing structure is wooden with a single box-spar and is covered with carbon fibre. Ailerons occupy about half the span; inboard, slotted flaps fill the rest. Both ailerons and flaps are fabric covered.

The fuselage and empennage have a wooden structure and carbon fibre skin. The engine with which she was born is the 73.5 kW (98.6 hp) Rotax 912S flat-four, driving a variable pitch propeller. The cabin is over the wings, with two pairs of side-by-side seats. Entry is by two upward-opening doors and there is a baggage space behind the rear seats. At the rear the vertical surfaces are straight-edged and swept, with a long dorsal strake. The horizontal surfaces are approximately trapezoidal in plan, with an unswept leading edge. Both the rudder and elevators are fabric covered. The rudder is balanced and both it and the port elevator carry trim tabs.

The Pioneer has retractable tricycle landing gear though the nose-wheel remains partially exposed when retracted. An emergency ballistic parachute is an option.

== Development ==
The date of the first flight of the Pioneer 400 is March 27, 2009, and it first appeared in public at the 2009 Friedrichshafen airshow held 2–5 April. Though briefly registered in Italy, by 11 June 2009 the first prototype had been re-registered in the UK as G-CGAJ. It received type approval in late 2010 and full approval in August 2012.

Although some examples were made in the ultralight category (MTOW 600 kg), the Pioneer 400 was created to be a 4-seater, designated Experimental has an MTOW of 850 kg (1,870 lb).

54 Pioneer 400s had been built by October 2024.

== Variants ==
Pioneer 400 915iS
MTOW 850 kg (1,870 lb), experimental category, equipped with Rotax 915iS 140 Hp engine
Pioneer 400 916iS
MTOW 850 kg (1,870 lb), experimental category, equipped with Rotax 916iS 160 Hp engine

== Specification (400 916iS) ==
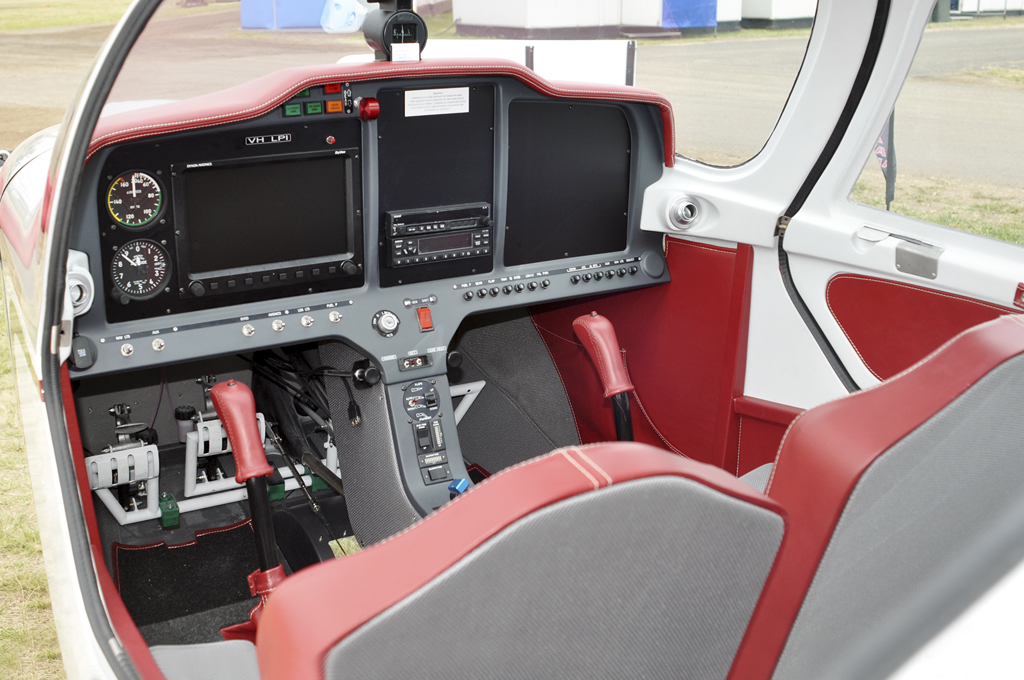

Data from Jane's All the World's Aircraft 2016/17 And Company website

General characteristics

- Crew: One
- Capacity: Three passengers
- Length: 7.00 m (23 ft 0 in)
- Wingspan: 8.80 m (28 ft 10 in)
- Wing area: 11.20 m^{2} (120.6 sq ft)
- Max takeoff weight: 850 kg (1,874 lb)
- Powerplant: 1 × Rotax 916 IS flat-four aircraft engine, 119 kW (160 hp)
- Propellers: 3-bladed variable pitch

Performance

- Maximum speed: 300 km/h (190 mph, 160 kn) Max cruise Speed
- Cruise speed: 277 km/h (172 mph, 150 kn)
- Stall speed: 67 km/h (42 mph, 36 kn)
- Range: 1,444 km (897 mi, 780 nmi) at 150KTAS FL100
- Service ceiling: 6,000 m (20,000 ft) service
- Maximum glide ratio: 13 best
- Rate of climb: 7.62 m/s (1,500 ft/min) maximum, at sea level
- Take-off and landing runs: 150 m (490 ft)

Avionics
GARMIN G3X DYNON HDX
