= Vidor Asso X Jewel =

Asso X Jewel
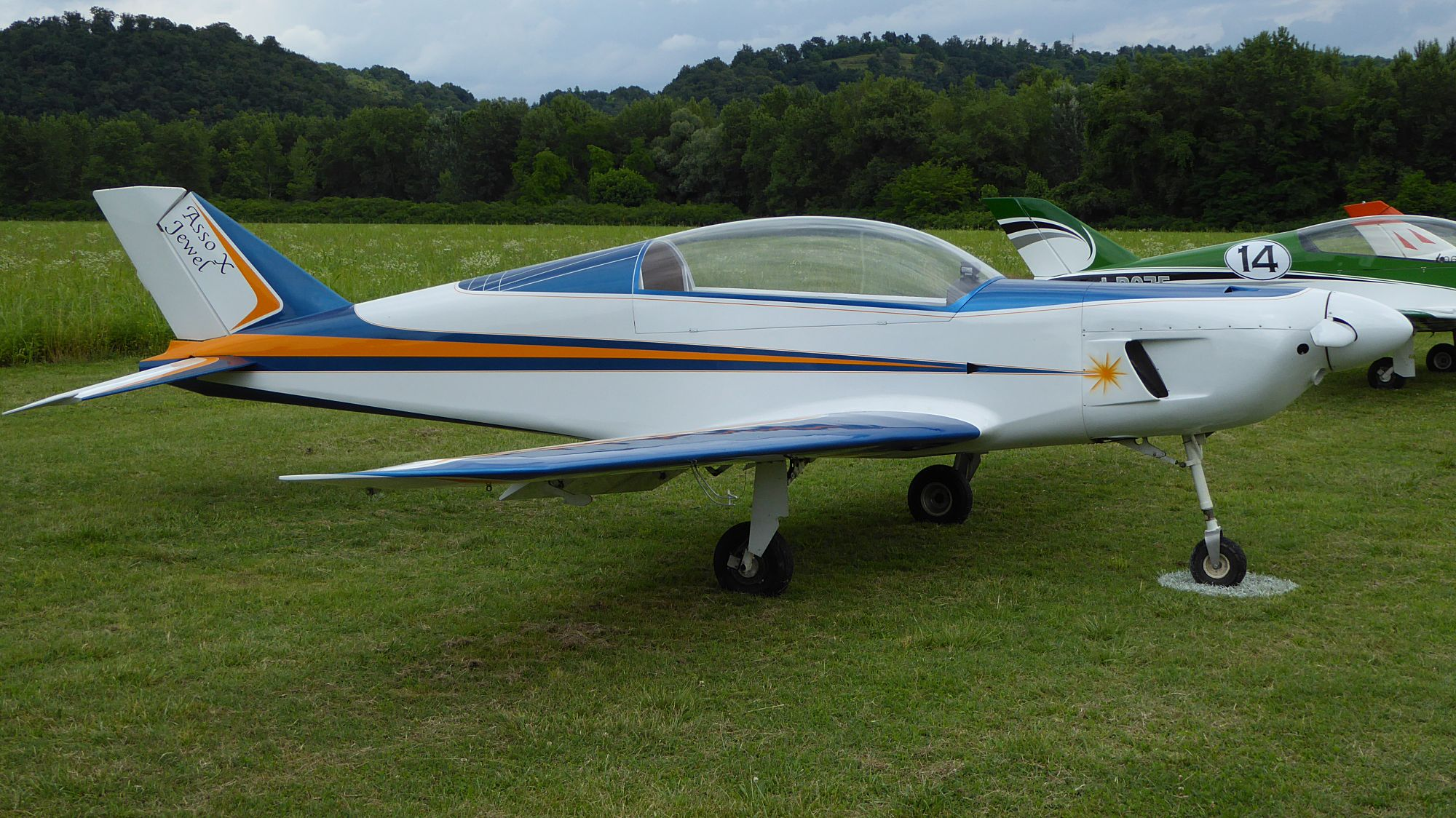

General information
- Type: Tandem seat ultralight
- National origin: Italy
- Designer: Giuseppe Vidor

History
- Variant: Millennium Master

The Asso X Jewel is an all - wood, low wing, single engine, two tandem seats ultralight aircraft, designed by Italian designer Giuseppe Vidor.

This aircraft is one of his many wooden designs, marketed by Vidor's Asso Aerei company, like the Asso V Champion, Asso IV Whisky and Asso VI Junior. The aircraft kit/plans are specified for the Rotax 912, but it is also one of the very few aircraft reported to be using the Sauer S 2100 ULT engine.

== Variants ==
Millennium Master
A composite airplane, evolved from the Asso X Jewel.

Pelegrin Tarragon
A composite airplane, evolved from the Millennium Master.

Blackshape Prime
A composite airplane, evolved from the Millennium Master.

== Specifications ==
Data from Light airplanes directory

General characteristics

- Capacity: 2
- Length: 7 m (23 ft 0 in)
- Wingspan: 8.1 m (26 ft 7 in)
- Height: 2.15 m (7 ft 1 in)
- Wing area: 9.6 m^{2} (103 sq ft)
- Empty weight: 282.5 kg (623 lb)
- Max takeoff weight: 472.5 kg (1,042 lb)
- Propellers: 2-bladed with ground-adjustable pitch

Performance

- Maximum speed: 300 km/h (190 mph, 160 kn)
- Cruise speed: 286 km/h (178 mph, 154 kn)
- Stall speed: 64 km/h (40 mph, 35 kn)
- Never exceed speed: 330 km/h (210 mph, 180 kn)
- Range: 1,300 km (810 mi, 700 nmi)
- Wing loading: 47 kg/m^{2} (9.6 lb/sq ft)
