= Issoire APM 20 Lionceau =

APM 20 Lionceau
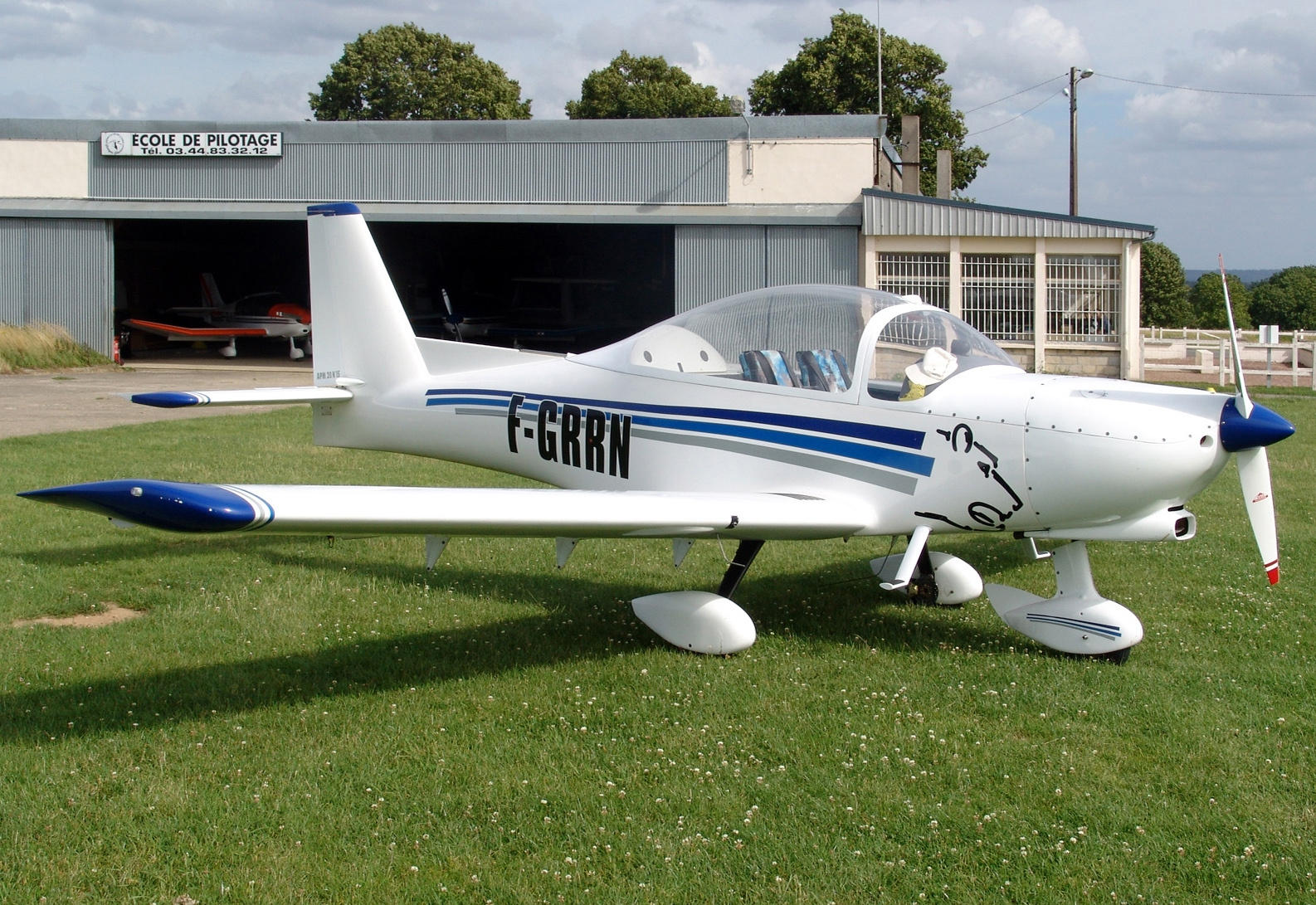

General information
- Type: Civil utility aircraft
- Manufacturer: Issoire Aviation
- Designer: Philippe Moniot
- Status: In production

History
- First flight: 21 November 1995
- Variants: APM 30 Lion; APM 40 Simba

The APM 20 Lionceau is a two-seat very light aircraft manufactured by the French manufacturer Issoire Aviation. Despite its classic appearance, it is entirely built from composite materials, especially carbon fibers.

Designed by Philippe Moniot and certified in 1999 (see EASA CS-VLA), this very light (400 kg empty, 634 kg loaded) and economical (80 PS engine) aircraft is primarily intended to be used to learn to fly, but also to travel with a relatively high cruise speed (113 knots).

A three-seat version, the APM 30 Lion, was presented at the 2005 Paris Air Show.

== Variants ==
APM 20 Lionceau
Three prototypes and 21 production aircraft (with larger tail)
APM 21 Lion
Prototype APM 20 fitted with winglets and a Rotax 912 ULS engine
APM 22 Liondo UAV
Experimental uncrewed variant

== Specifications ==
Data from Jane's All The World's Aircraft 2003–2004

General characteristics

- Crew: 1
- Capacity: 1 pax
- Length: 6.6 m (21 ft 8 in)
- Wingspan: 8.66 m (28 ft 5 in)
- Height: 2.4 m (7 ft 10 in)
- Wing area: 9.5 m^{2} (102 sq ft)
- Aspect ratio: 7.9
- Airfoil: NACA 63-418
- Empty weight: 380 kg (838 lb)
- Max takeoff weight: 620 kg (1,367 lb)
- Powerplant: 1 × Rotax 912 A2 4-cylinder air-cooled horizontally-opposed piston engine, 59.6 kW (79.9 hp)
- Propellers: 2-bladed fixed-pitch propeller

Performance

- Cruise speed: 230 km/h (140 mph, 120 kn)
- Stall speed: 80 km/h (50 mph, 43 kn)
- Never exceed speed: 250 km/h (160 mph, 130 kn)
- Endurance: 4–5 hours
- Rate of climb: 3.4 m/s (670 ft/min)
