= Horizontec Halcón =

Halcón
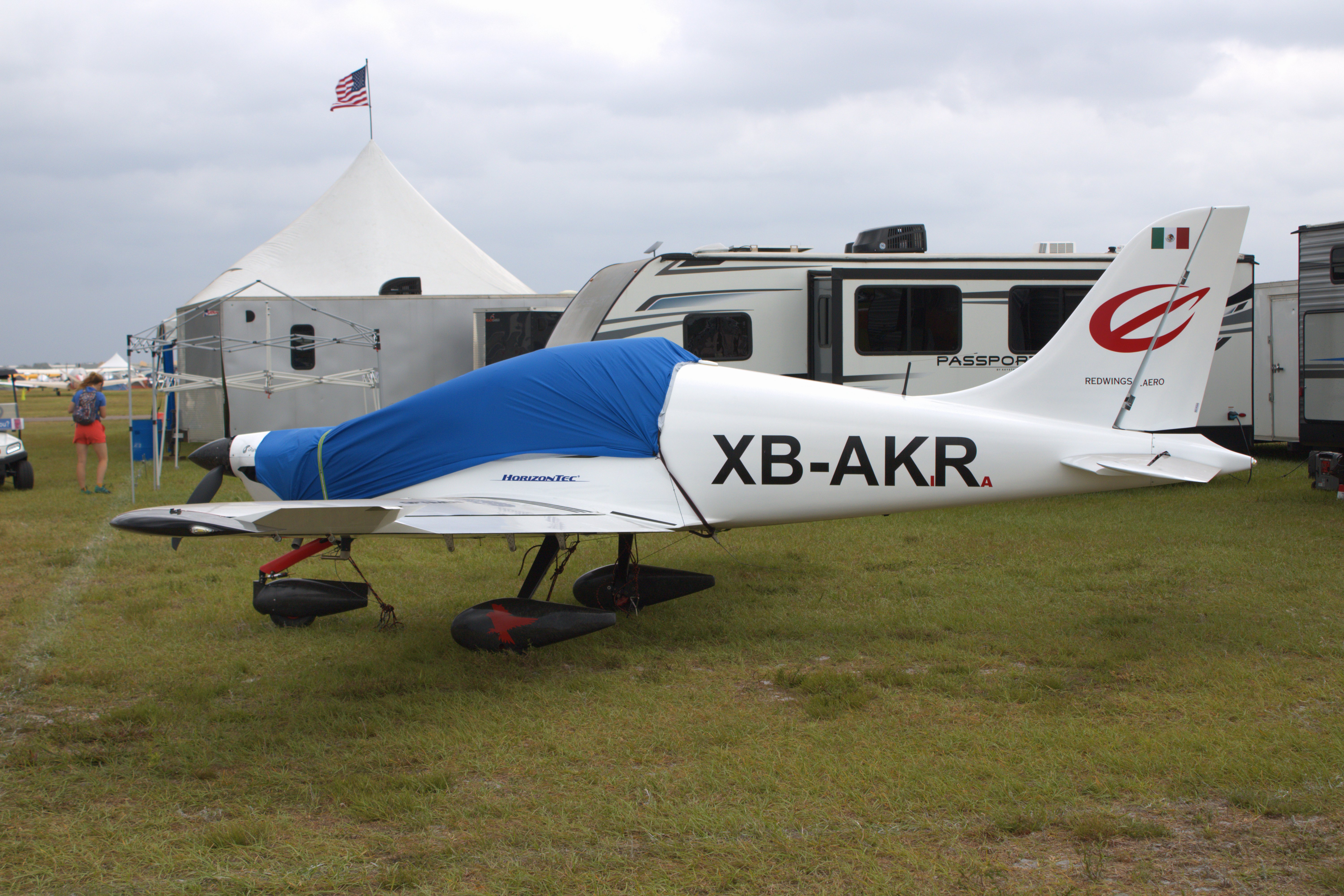
- Halcón II at 2024 Sun 'n Fun

General information
- Type: Light-sport aircraft
- National origin: Mexico
- Manufacturer: Horizontec; IK Aerospace
- Designer: Giovani Angelucci
- Status: In development
- Number built: 2 (until 2019)

History
- First flight: September 30, 2017

The Horizontec Halcón is a light-sport aircraft (LSA) developed and manufactured in Mexico by Horizontec, the Universidad Aeronáutica de Querétaro (UNAQ) and the Centro Nacional de Tecnología Aeronáuticas (CENTA).

== Design and development ==
The design was conceived in Italy by Giovani Angelucci, who later moved to Mexico City to create the first prototype, and the company Horizontec was born in 2014. In 2015 CONACYT and the Ministry of Economy granted financial support for 5 million pesos (around $312,000 US dollars) to support the project, which would be incubated a year later by CENTA and UNAQ.

The first prototype (called Halcon H1) was built with aircraft grade wood, fiberglass, epoxy resin and other light materials, it included a 100 horsepower Rotax 912 ULS engine and its first flight was made on September 30, 2017.

Its seating configuration is side by side, with fixed tricycle landing gear. The aircraft is designed to carry out tasks such as surveillance, reconnaissance, exhibition, research and development. In 2016 SEDENA presented the model of a military trainer plane called "Proyecto Azteca A01", which received strong criticism for its similarities with the Halcón H1.

The Halcón H1 was used as the basis for the development of the Horizontec Halcón H2.1, which received the type approval certificate for light sport aircraft number CRT-1041/2025 from AFAC on September 9, 2025, which was presented by the Secretary of Economy Marcelo Ebrard. Unlike the Halcón H1, the Halcón H2.1 is built with composite materials and mounts a 141 HP Rotax 915 iS engine and supports loads of +4/-2 G forces.

== Accidents and incidents ==
- On April 15, 2021, a Halcón H1 aircraft with registration XB-PMZ that was conducting touch and go landings at Querétaro Airport had to make a forced landing in the Municipality of Colón, severely damaging the aircraft and leaving its two crew members injured.

== Specifications (Halcon 2.1) ==
Data from

General characteristics

- Crew: 1
- Capacity: 1 passenger
- Length: 6.4 m (21 ft)
- Wingspan: 9.4 m (30 ft 10 in)
- Height: 2.1 m (6 ft 11 in)
- MTOW: 600 kg (1,323 lb)
- Powerplant: 1 × Rotax 915 iS 3A, 141 HP
- Propeller: 70 inches 3-blade Sensenich 3Y0RSC70MY-0

Performance

- Cruise speed: 252 km/h (136 kn, 157 MPH)
- Stall speed: 78 km/h (42 kn, 48 MPH)
- Range: 1,100 km (594 NMi, 683 Mi)
- Service ceiling: 18,000 ft (5,486 m)
- Endurance: 4.5 horas
- g limits: +4/-2
