= Alpi Pioneer 300 Kite =

Italian light-sport aircraft

Pioneer 300 Kite
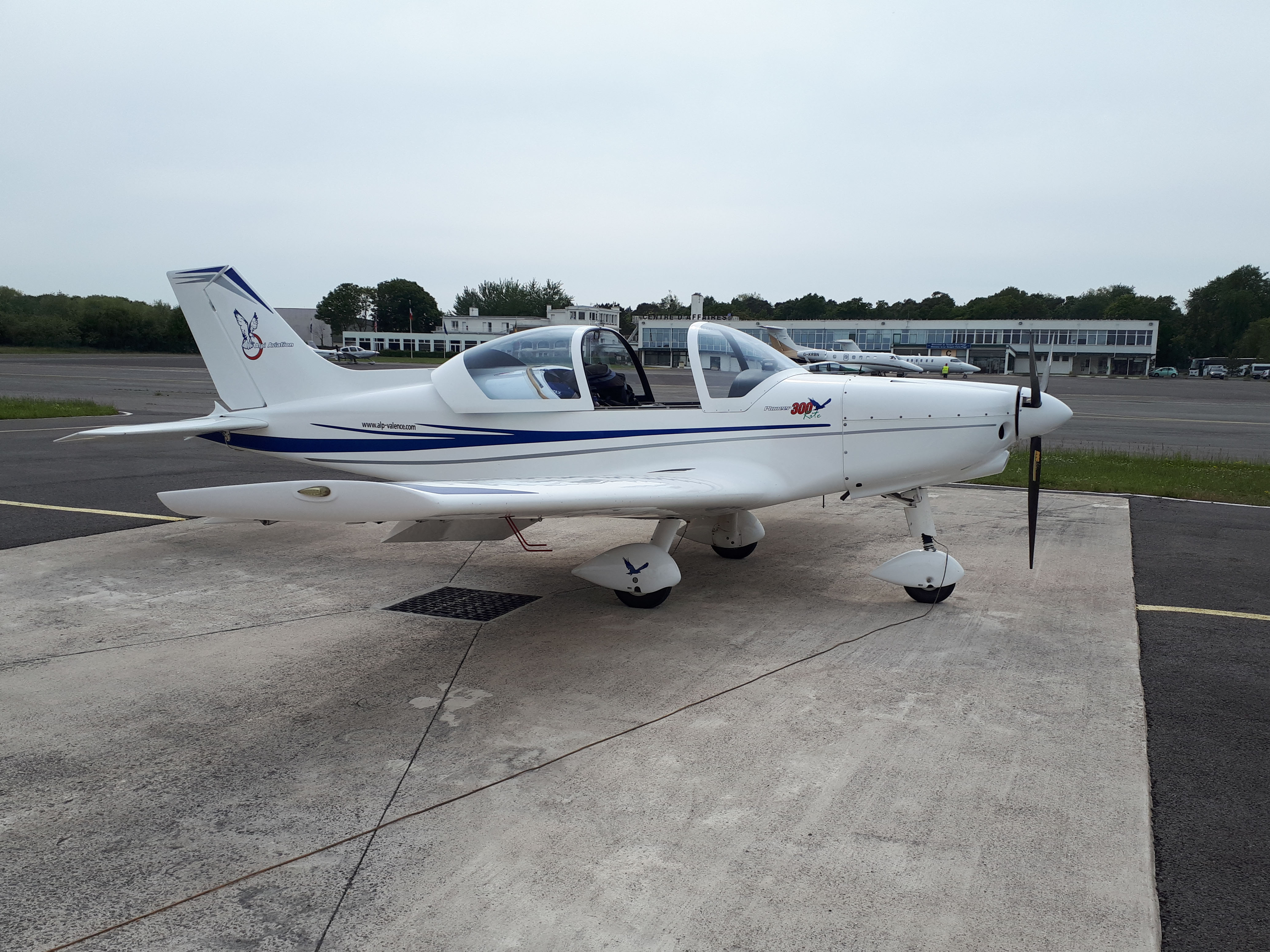
- P300 Kite (FG) at Le Touquet Airport - (LFAT), France

General information
- Type: ultralight or Light-sport aircraft
- National origin: Italy
- Manufacturer: Alpi Aviation
- Status: In production (2017)

History
- Developed from: Alpi Pioneer 300

The Alpi Pioneer 300 Kite also branded Pionner 300 FG (for fixed gear) is an Italian ultralight and light-sport aircraft designed and produced by Alpi Aviation of Pordenone. The aircraft is supplied as a kit for amateur construction or complete and ready-to-fly.

== Design and development ==
The Pioneer 300 Kite is a fixed gear version of the Alpi Pioneer 300. Designed to comply with the US light-sport aircraft rules, it features a cantilever low-wing, an enclosed cockpit with two-seats-in-side-by-side configuration under a bubble canopy, fixed tricycle landing gear and a single engine in tractor configuration.

The aircraft is made from wood and covered with composite material. Its 7.55 m (24.8 ft) span wing has an area of 10 m^{2} (110 sq ft) and mounts flaps. It is powered by a 100 hp (75 kW) Rotax 912ULS engine.

Apart from being available fully assembled it is also available as two different kits, one a 51% kit and the other EuroKit, which includes a factory assembled airframe, but lacks the engine installation.

As of May 2025, the design does not appear on the Federal Aviation Administration's list of approved special light-sport aircraft.

== Specifications (Pioneer 300 Kite) ==
Data from Tacke and manufacturer

General characteristics

- Crew: one
- Capacity: one passenger
- Length: 6.25 m (20 ft 6 in)
- Wingspan: 7.55 m (24 ft 9 in)
- Wing area: 10 m^{2} (110 sq ft)
- Empty weight: 315 kg (694 lb)
- Gross weight: 560 kg (1,235 lb)
- Fuel capacity: 80 litres (18 imp gal; 21 US gal)
- Powerplant: 1 × Rotax 912ULS four cylinder, liquid and air-cooled, four stroke aircraft engine, 75 kW (101 hp)
- Propellers: 2-bladed composite

Performance

- Maximum speed: 240 km/h (150 mph, 130 kn)
- Cruise speed: 220 km/h (140 mph, 120 kn)
- Stall speed: 72 km/h (45 mph, 39 kn)
- Range: 900 km (560 mi, 490 nmi)
- Service ceiling: 5,000 m (16,000 ft)
- g limits: +3.8/-1.9
- Rate of climb: 6 m/s (1,200 ft/min)
- Wing loading: 56.0 kg/m^{2} (11.5 lb/sq ft)
