= Issoire APM 40 Simba =

APM 40 Simba
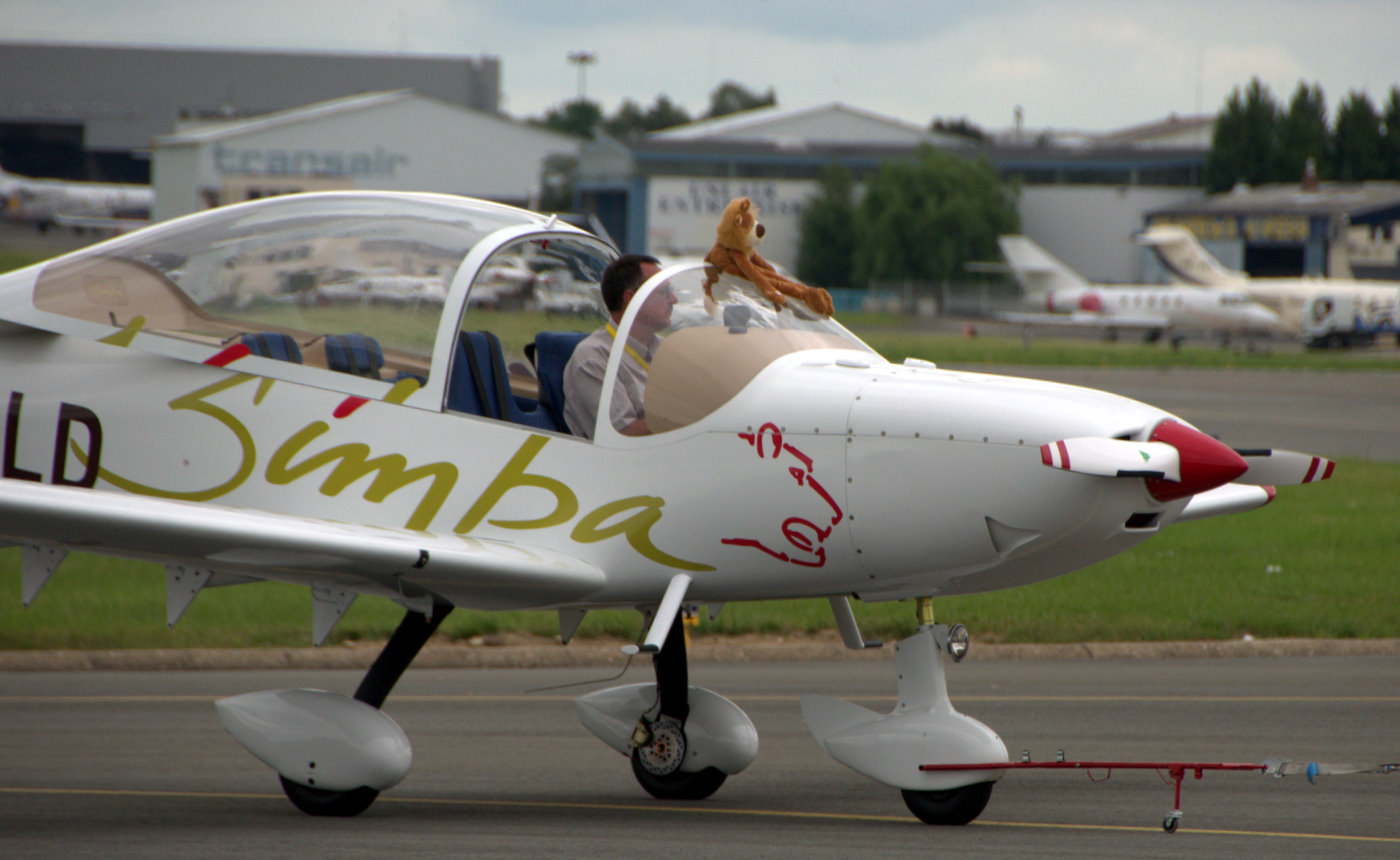

General information
- Type: Civil utility aircraft
- National origin: France
- Manufacturer: Issoire Aviation

History
- First flight: 19 May 2009
- Developed from: APM 30 Lion

The Issoire APM 40 Simba is a four-seat light aircraft manufactured by the French manufacturer Issoire Aviation. It is entirely built from carbon-fiber-reinforced polymers. The aircraft's first flight was on 19 May 2009, and it made its public debut at the Paris Air Show in June 2009.

It is a derivative of the 2-seater APM 20 Lionceau and 3-seater APM 30 Lion.

== Variants ==
APM 40 Simba
Powered by a continental IO-240F.
APM 41 Simba 915iS
Powered by a Rotax 915iS. Scheduled to enter service in Q1 of 2017.

== Specifications ==
Data from Le Point and Gil Roy

General characteristics

- Crew: 1
- Capacity: 3 passengers
- Length: 7.7 m (25 ft 3 in)
- Wingspan: 8.66 m (28 ft 5 in)
- Empty weight: 490 kg (1,080 lb)
- Max takeoff weight: 1,000 kg (2,205 lb)
- Powerplant: 1 × Teledyne Continental Motors IO-240F 4-cyl. air-cooled horizontally-opposed piston engine, 93 kW (125 hp)

Performance

- Cruise speed: 220 km/h (140 mph, 120 kn)
- Range: 700 km (430 mi, 380 nmi)
