= Issoire Aviation =

Issoire Aviation is a French aircraft manufacturer established on 1 February 1978 in Issoire to build gliders and support the products of Wassmer Aviation following that company's closure.

The company is part of the REXiAA Group as well as building composite light aircraft it creates composite materials, notably for aviation (such as components in the Airbus, helicopters, the Eurocopter, and also the Mirage).

== Products ==
- Issoire APM 20 Lionceau
- Issoire APM 30 Lion
- Issoire APM 40 Simba
- Issoire APM 50 Nala
