= Luciano Belviso =

Italian businessman

- Born: 18 August 1983 (age 42); Bari, Italy
- Occupation(s): Entrepreneur, Aerospace Engineer

Luciano Belviso (born August 18, 1983) is an Italian Entrepreneur, Manager and Aerospace Engineer. He is founder and CEO of Blackshape Aircraft.

== Early life and education ==
Belviso was born in Bari where he attended the scientific lyceum. He then moved to northern Italy, Switzerland and France for his university education. Belviso holds a M.Sc. in mechanical engineering from the Swiss Federal Institute of Technology of Lausanne, a LL.M. in space and telecommunications law from the University of Paris XI and a B.Eng in aerospace engineering from the Polytechnic University of Turin.

== Career and interests ==
Belviso started his career at 23, soon after his graduation, with consultancy and academic appointments, in the field of meta-modeling techniques.

== Blackshape Aircraft ==
In 2009, at the age of 25, Belviso founded the company Blackshape Aircraft, in Monopoli, with his friend Angelo Petrosillo as co-founder.

The early life of the company was initially granted by a regionally funded program for youth entrepreneurship, offering €25,000 grants. The company started to re-design a tandem two-seater aircraft (originally the Asso X) for the luxury market. One year later, the majority of shares were sold to the holding Angelo Investments and Blackshape became a stock company. Thanks to the capital expansion, the company started the certification of the first aircraft, named BS100 (commercial name Blackshape Prime), and the serial manufacturing, gaining relevant market feedback thanks to its high-technology carbon fiber aircraft. In 2013 the company launched a new program, the BS115, for a larger two-seater for utility operations and training. Belviso leads the company as CEO and CTO.

== Affiliation ==
Belviso is member of the Space Generation Advisory Council in support of the United Nations Space Programme, member of the International Institute of Space Law.

== Personal life ==
Belviso studied piano since he was 7. He later studied violin and organ. Occasionally Belviso takes part to some concerts playing or singing. Besides Italian, his mothertongue, Belviso speaks English, French and German.
