= Millennium Master =

Master

General information
- Type: Tandem seat ultralight
- National origin: Italy
- Manufacturer: Millennium Aircraft (Compact Compositi srl), Turin

History
- First flight: 27 May 2006
- Developed from: Asso X Jewel
- Variants: Blackshape Prime; Pelegrin Tarragon

The Millennium Master is a low wing, single engine, tandem two-seat ultralight aircraft, constructed chiefly of carbon fibre. Designed and built in Italy, it flew for the first time in 2006.

== Design and development ==
The design of the Millennium Master stemmed from that of an earlier, wooden Asso X kit built aircraft but the structure has been entirely transformed into prepreg carbon fibre by Millennium Aircraft. The structural design was done by the Department of Aerostructures at the University of Turin and the aerodynamics were investigated by Alenia.

The Master has a low set, trapezoidal wing, though that plan is modified by an extended wing root fairing or glove, plus wing tips of the Küchemann type with curved leading edges. Flaps occupy the whole trailing edge inboard of the ailerons and have four settings. These flaps are slotted and are each in two spanwise parts, the break placed at the wing fold hinge line.

A single piece canopy covers the tandem seats, with the rear seat higher than the other. Behind the cockpit the fuselage line falls to the tail. The tailplane is straight edged with rounded tips and carries marked anhedral. The fin and rudder are also straight edged but swept; there is a small additional ventral fin. Elevator has trim tabs. The Master has a tricycle undercarriage, the nosewheel retracting rearwards and the main legs inwards into the wings. The track is 2.01 m (6 ft 7 in).

The Master is powered by a Rotax 912 ULS 100 HP (74 kW). It drives a two blade propeller with variable pitch in flight.

The Master first flew on 27 May 2006 and appeared in public for the first time at Aero '07 at Friedrichshafen in Germany in 2007. A second prototype flew in December 2007. Production was planned to start in October 2007, beginning with complete aircraft before commencing kit production.

The company went bankrupt before production of the Master was started and the design was later acquired by Blackshape of Monopoli, Italy and developed into the Blackshape Prime. The design was also developed into the Pelegrin Tarragon by Pelegrin Limited in conjunction with CFM Air.

== Specifications (912 ULS engine) ==
Data from Jane's All the World's Aircraft 2010/11

General characteristics

- Capacity: 2
- Length: 7.18 m (23 ft 7 in)
- Wingspan: 7.94 m (26 ft 1 in)
- Height: 2.41 m (7 ft 11 in)
- Wing area: 9.96 m^{2} (107.2 sq ft)
- Empty weight: 285 kg (628 lb)
- Max takeoff weight: 450 kg (992 lb)
- Powerplant: 1 × Rotax 912ULS 4-cylinder horizontally opposed, 59.6 kW (79.9 hp)
- Propellers: 2-bladed with ground-adjustable pitch

Performance

- Cruise speed: 306 km/h (190 mph, 165 kn)
- Stall speed: 62 km/h (39 mph, 33 kn)
- Never exceed speed: 378 km/h (235 mph, 204 kn)
