= Rotax 915 iS =

Austrian aircraft engine

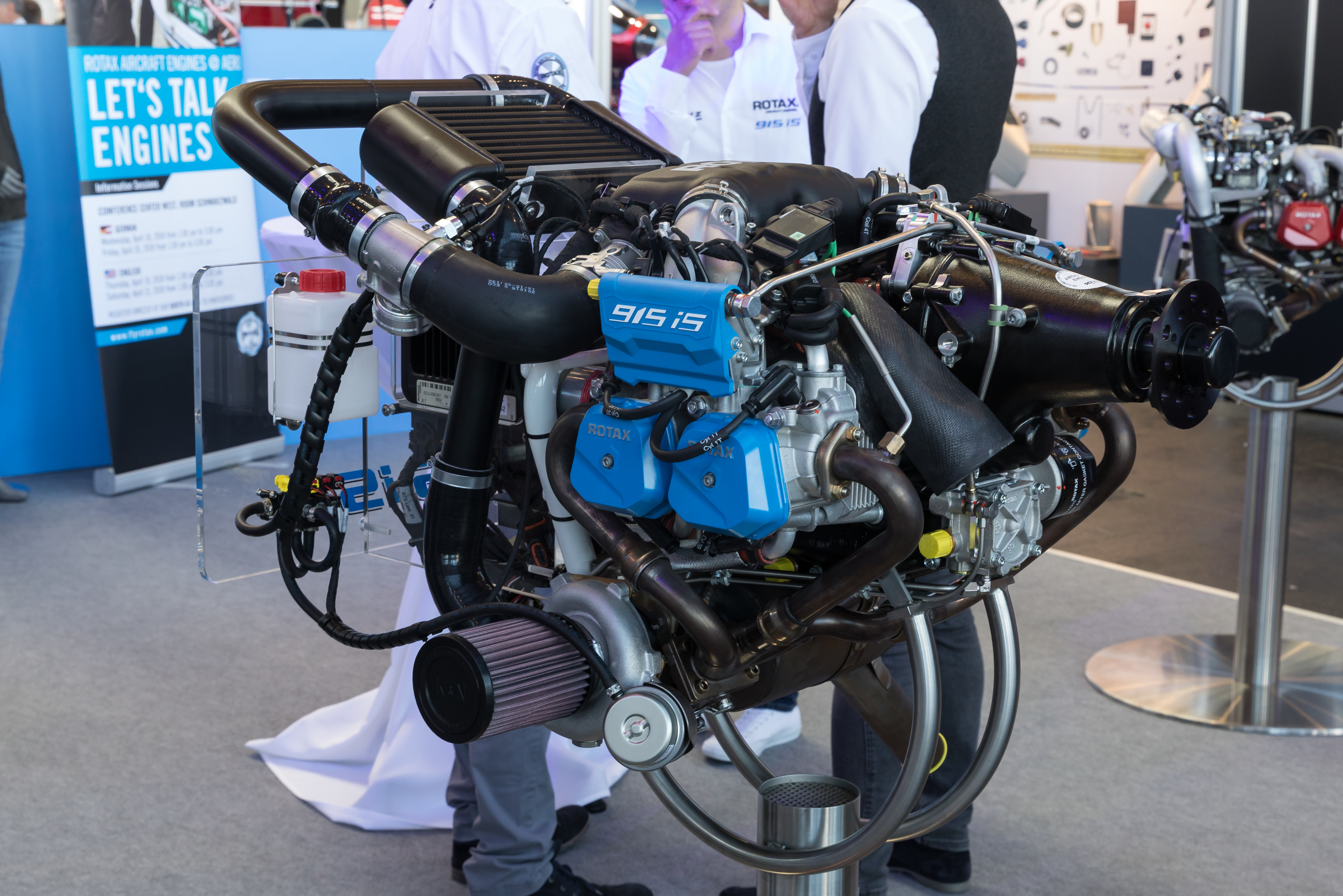
- Type: Piston aircraft engine
- National origin: Austria
- Manufacturer: Rotax
- First run: 2014
- Major applications: Issoire APM 41 Simba 915iS
- Manufactured: 2017–present
- Developed from: Rotax 912
- Variants: Rotax 916 iS

The Rotax 915 iS is an Austrian aircraft engine, produced by Rotax of Gunskirchen for use in ultralight aircraft, homebuilt aircraft, light-sport aircraft, small helicopters and gyroplanes. The engine was type certified in 2017.

The engine was first publicly displayed at AirVenture in July 2015 and first flown in March 2016.

In January 2016 the engine was named AVweb's "Best New Engine" of 2015.

== Design and development ==
The Rotax 915 iS is a four-cylinder four-stroke, horizontally-opposed, turbocharged, air and liquid-cooled, gasoline engine design, with a mechanical gearbox reduction drive. The turbocharger has a compression ratio of 3.5:1 and the engine will have a critical altitude of 15,000 ft (4,572 m). It employs dual electronically controlled fuel injection, using dual channel Rockwell Collins ECUs, with dual ignition and produces 141 hp (105 kW) for take-off and 135 hp (101 kW) continuous. The engine can produce rated power up to 15,000 ft (4,572 m) and has a ceiling of 23,000 ft (7,010 m).

The engine is based on the Rotax 912, but differs in that it has fuel injection, a reinforced crankshaft, new pistons, a new gearbox and a turbocharger. Time between overhauls was expected to eventually be raised to 2000 hours with operational experience, but started at 1200 hours.

The design entered production in the second half of 2017. The European Aviation Safety Agency certified the Rotax 915 iSc3 A on 14 December 2017 and the Rotax 915 iSc3 B on 4 January 2018.

In December 2021 the option to replace the 12V electrical system with a 24V one was introduced. The 24V version of the engine is designated the 915iS C24 for the non-certified version and the 915iSc C24 certified version.

== Variants ==
Rotax 915iS
Base version with a 12V electrical system
Rotax 915iS C24
Non-certified model with 24V electrical system
Rotax 915iSc C24
Certified model with 24V electrical system

== Applications ==
- Pro.Mecc Freccia Anemo
- Blackshape Prime
- Horizontec Halcón 2.1
- Issoire APM 41 Simba 915iS
- Progressive Aerodyne SeaRey
- Sling Aircraft Sling TSi
- Swiss Excellence Risen
- Flying Legend Tucano Replica
- Bristell B23-915 Turbo
- TL Sparker
- TL Stream

== Specifications (915 iS) ==
Data from AVweb and manufacturer's website

=== General characteristics ===
- Type: four-cylinder, four-stroke, horizontally-opposed, geared aircraft engine
- Bore: 84.0 mm (3.3 in)
- Stroke: 61.0 mm (2.4 in)
- Displacement: 1,352 cc (82.5 cu in)
- Dry weight: 84.6 kg (186.5 lb) dry

=== Components ===
- Turbocharger: with a compression ratio of 3.5:1
- Fuel system: dual channel Rockwell Collins ECUs
- Fuel type: high-octane automotive gasoline
- Cooling system: liquid and air
- Reduction gear: mechanical gear type

=== Performance ===
- Power output: 141 hp (105 kW) for take-off, 135 hp (101 kW) continuous
- Specific fuel consumption: 280–310 g/(kW·h) at 5,500 rpm
- Power-to-weight ratio: 0.73 hp/lb (1.19 kW/kg)

== See also ==
Related lists

- List of aircraft engines
