= Issoire APM 30 Lion =

French light aeroplane

APM 30 Lion
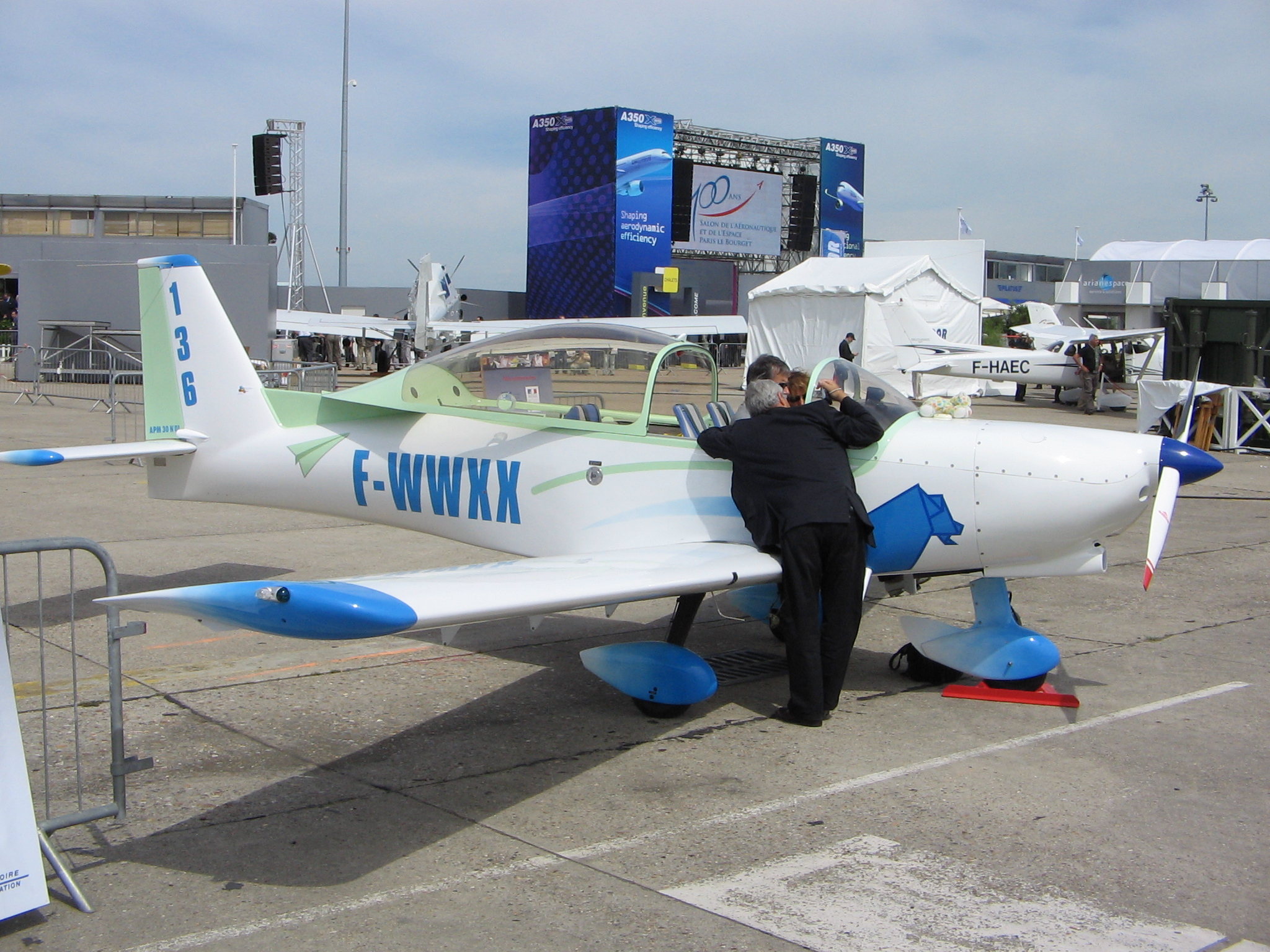

General information
- Type: Training aircraft
- National origin: France
- Manufacturer: Issoire Aviation
- Status: In production (2015)

History
- First flight: 2 June 2005
- Developed from: APM 20 Lionceau

The Issoire APM 30 Lion is a French three-seat light aircraft manufactured by Issoire Aviation of Issoire. Designed as a trainer, the aircraft is type certified under CS-VLA and is supplied complete and ready-to-fly.

== Design and development ==
The aircraft features a cantilever low-wing, a three-seat enclosed cockpit under a bubble canopy, fixed tricycle landing gear with wheel pants and a single engine in tractor configuration.

The aircraft is made from composite materials. Its 8.66 m (28.4 ft) span wing employs a NACA 63-618 airfoil, has an area of 9.5 m^{2} (102 sq ft) and mounts flaps. The standard engine is the 100 hp (75 kW) Rotax 912S four-stroke powerplant.

== Specifications ==
Data from Tacke

General characteristics

- Crew: one
- Capacity: two passengers
- Wingspan: 8.66 m (28 ft 5 in)
- Wing area: 9.5 m^{2} (102 sq ft)
- Empty weight: 418 kg (922 lb)
- Gross weight: 735 kg (1,620 lb)
- Fuel capacity: 78 litres (17 imp gal; 21 US gal)
- Powerplant: 1 × Rotax 912S four cylinder, liquid and air-cooled, four stroke aircraft engine, 75 kW (101 hp)
- Propellers: 2-bladed fixed pitch

Performance

- Maximum speed: 265 km/h (165 mph, 143 kn)
- Cruise speed: 210 km/h (130 mph, 110 kn)
- Stall speed: 81 km/h (50 mph, 44 kn)
- Rate of climb: 4.5 m/s (890 ft/min)
- Wing loading: 77.4 kg/m^{2} (15.9 lb/sq ft)
