= Alpi Pioneer 200 =

Italian ultralight aircraft

Pioneer 200
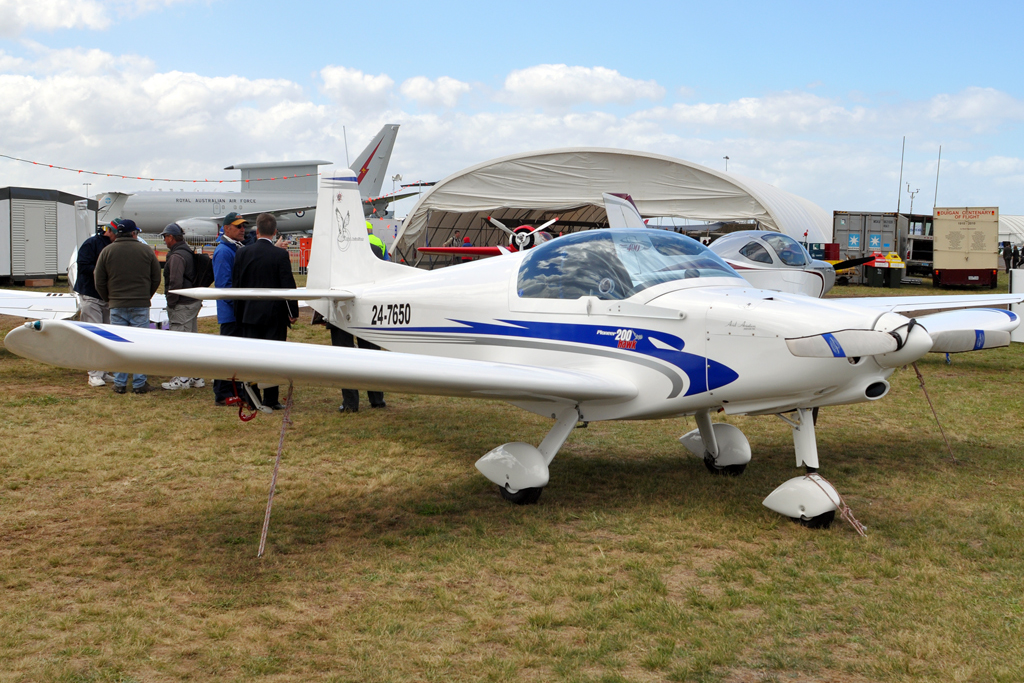
- Alpi Aviation Pioneer 200 Sparrow

General information
- Type: Ultralight aircraft and Light-sport aircraft
- National origin: Italy
- Manufacturer: Alpi Aviation
- Status: In production

The Alpi Pioneer 200 is an Italian ultralight and light-sport aircraft, designed and produced by Alpi Aviation, of Pordenone. The aircraft is supplied as a kit for amateur construction or as a complete ready-to-fly-aircraft.

== Design and development ==
The Pioneer 200 was designed to comply with the Fédération Aéronautique Internationale microlight rules and US light-sport aircraft rules. It features a cantilever low-wing, a two-seats-in-side-by-side configuration enclosed cockpit under a bubble canopy, fixed tricycle landing gear and a single engine in tractor configuration.

The aircraft is made from wood. Its 7.30 m (24.0 ft) span wing is rectangular in planform to reduce construction costs. Standard engine available is the 80 hp (60 kW) Rotax 912UL. The 80 hp (60 kW) Jabiru 2200 was used in the past.

== Variants ==
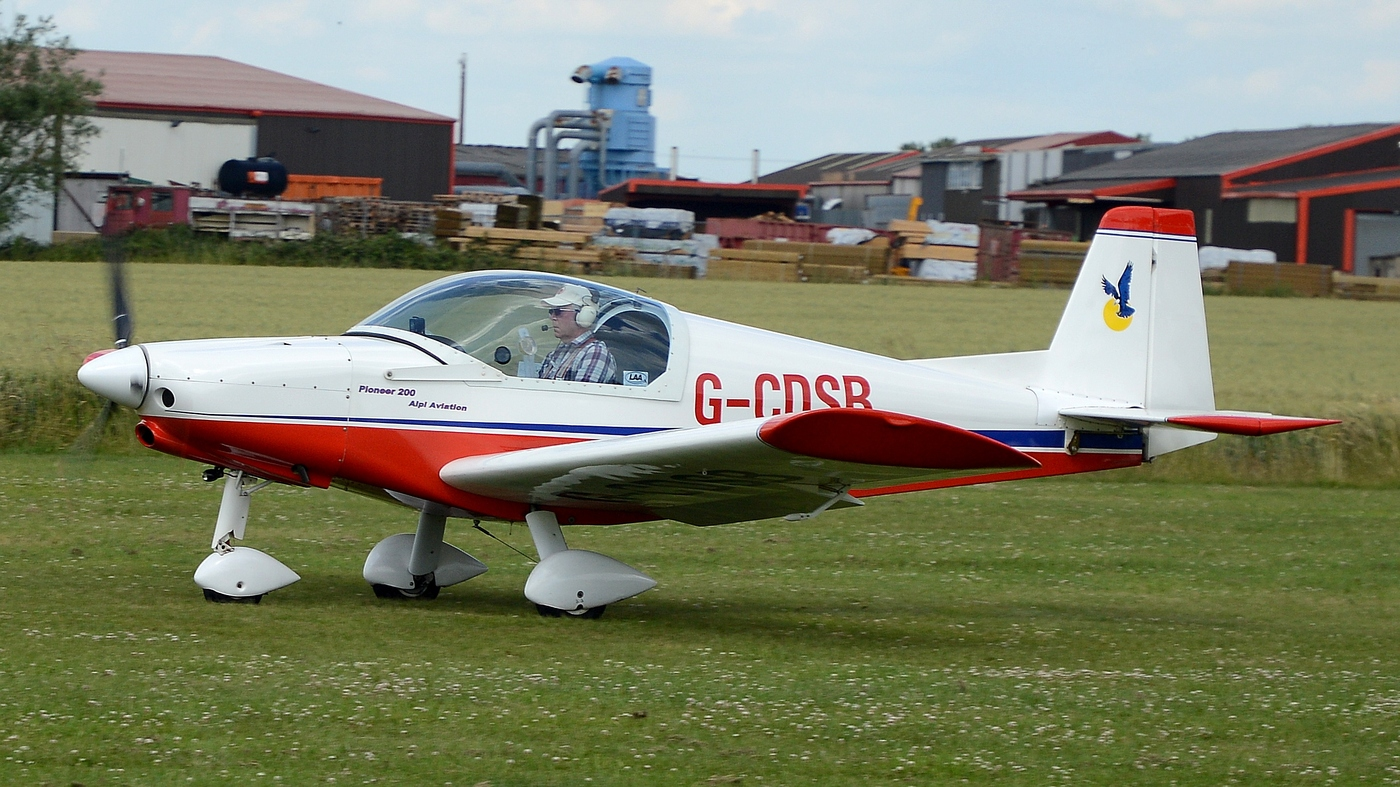
Alpi Pioneer 200

Pioneer 200 Standard
Base model, will accept engines from 60 to 80 hp (45 to 60 kW).
Pioneer 200 Sauer
Model powered by a Sauer 1800 UL Volkswagen air-cooled engine.
Pioneer 200 Sparrow
Model with luxury interior, carbon fibre instrument panel and Rotax 912ULS engine of 100 hp (75 kW).
Pioneer 200 Beluga
Model with extended turtle-deck baggage to carry extended length loads.
Pioneer 230
Model with optional equipment included as standard. Engines available are the 80 hp (60 kW) Rotax 912UL, 100 hp (75 kW) Rotax 912ULS and the 100 hp (75 kW) Rotax 912iS four stroke powerplants.

== Specifications (Pioneer 200) ==
Data from Bayerl and Tacke

General characteristics

- Crew: one
- Capacity: one passenger
- Wingspan: 7.30 m (23 ft 11 in)
- Wing area: 10.22 m^{2} (110.0 sq ft)
- Empty weight: 264 kg (582 lb)
- Gross weight: 472.5 kg (1,042 lb)
- Fuel capacity: 54 litres (12 imp gal; 14 US gal)
- Powerplant: 1 × Jabiru 2200 four cylinder, air-cooled, four stroke, 60 kW (80 hp)
- Propellers: 2-bladed composite

Performance

- Maximum speed: 210 km/h (130 mph, 110 kn)
- Cruise speed: 180 km/h (110 mph, 97 kn)
- Stall speed: 63 km/h (39 mph, 34 kn)
- Rate of climb: 6 m/s (1,200 ft/min)
- Wing loading: 46.23 kg/m^{2} (9.47 lb/sq ft)
