= Pelegrin Tarragon =

Latvian ultralight aircraft

Tarragon
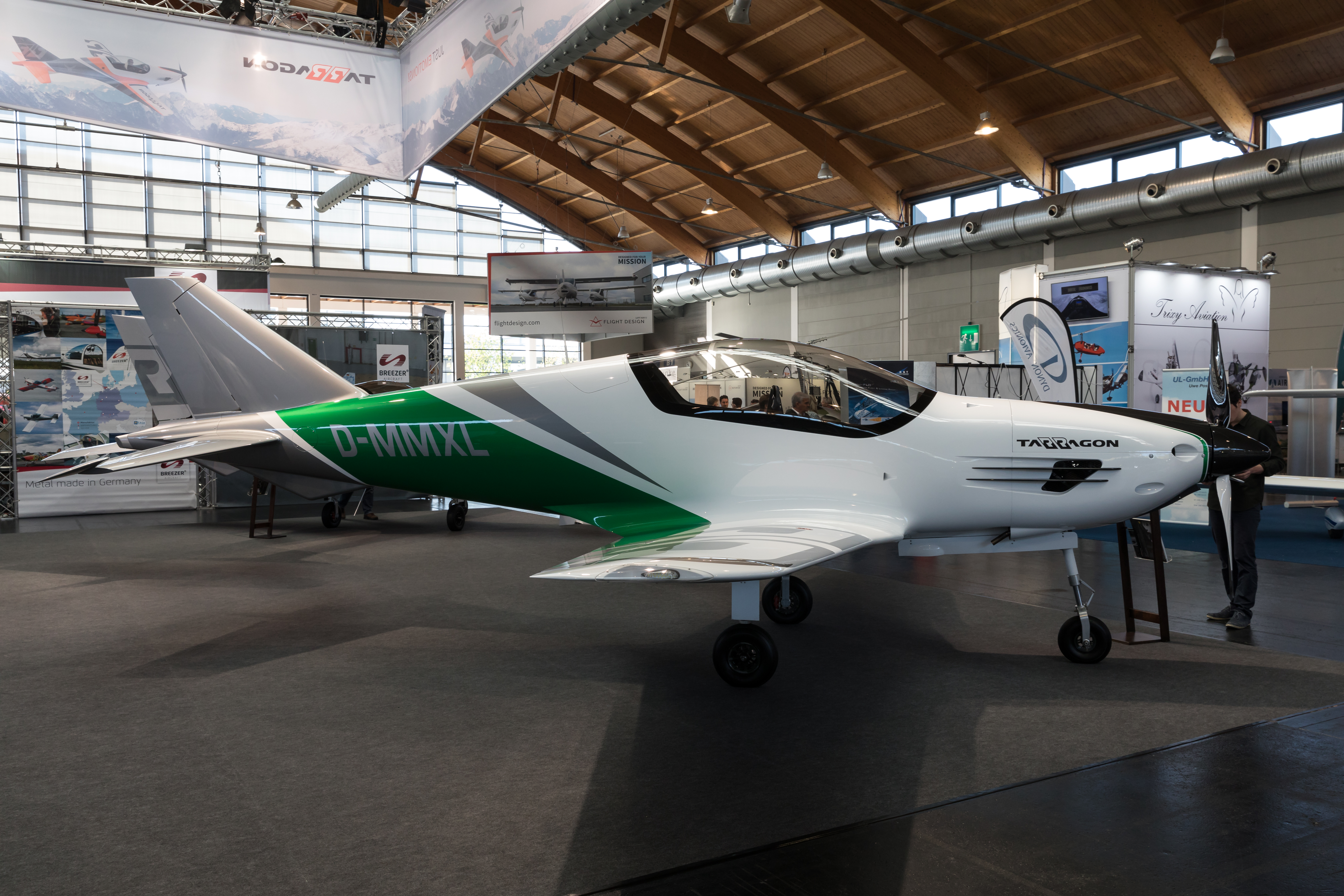

General information
- Type: Ultralight aircraft
- National origin: Latvia
- Manufacturer: Pelegrin Limited
- Status: In production (2018)

History
- Developed from: Millennium Master

The Tarragon is a Latvian ultralight aircraft that is produced by Pelegrin LTD since 2012. Tarragon aircraft is tailor-made to each customer, is supplied complete and ready-to-fly.

== Design and development ==
Named for the herb, the Tarragon was developed from the Millennium Master after the manufacturer of that design went bankrupt. The Tarragon ULM sports aircraft has been developed by Pelegrin LTD in conjunction with CFM Air.

The Tarragon was designed to comply with the Fédération Aéronautique Internationale microlight rules. It features a cantilever low-wing, an enclosed cockpit with two-seats-in-tandem under a bubble canopy, retractable tricycle landing gear and a single engine in tractor configuration.

The Tarragon's airframe is fully made from pre-preg carbon fibre composites. Its 7.94 m (26.0 ft) span wing mounts flaps. Standard engines available are the 100 hp (75 kW) EPA Power SA-R917TNi ULM, the 100 hp (75 kW) Rotax 912ULS and Rotax 912iS, the turbocharged 115 hp (86 kW) Rotax 914, the 135 hp (101 kW) Rotax 915 iS and the 130 hp (97 kW) EPA Power SA917Ti Turbo Injection four-stroke powerplants.

In mid-2014 the Latvian ultralight certification was pending.

In 2020 it set an unofficial world speed record for ultralight airplanes at 402 km/h (217 kn; 250 mph).

== Operators ==
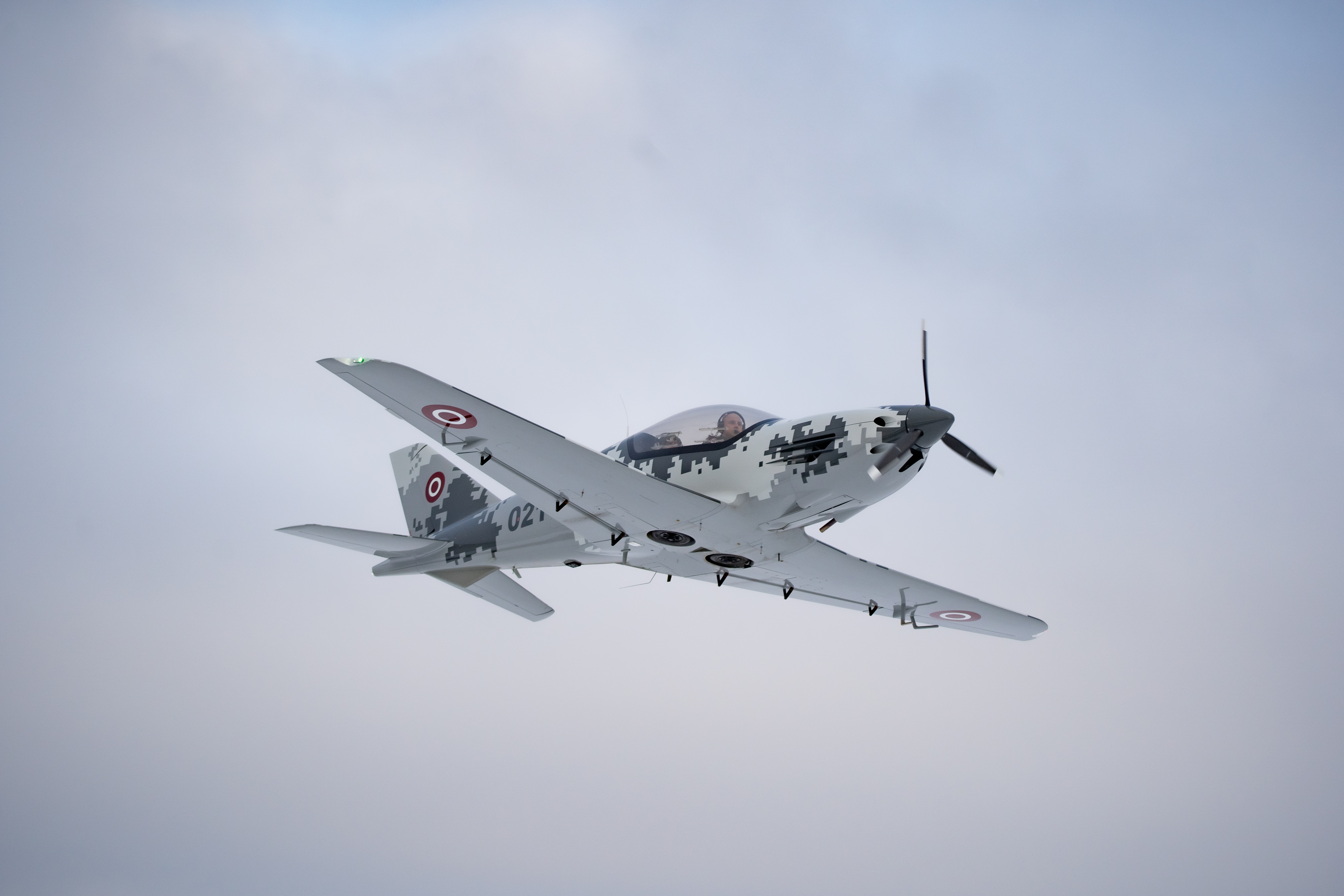
Latvian Air Force Pelegrin Tarragon TR-91

Latvia

- Latvian Air Force - two acquired in late 2022 for training.

== Specifications (Tarragon) ==
Data from Tacke and manufacturer

General characteristics

- Crew: one
- Capacity: one passenger
- Length: 7.53 m (24 ft 8 in)
- Wingspan: 7.94 m (26 ft 1 in)
- Height: 2.49 m (8 ft 2 in)
- Empty weight: 338 kg (745 lb)
- Fuel capacity: 96 litres (21 imp gal; 25 US gal)
- Powerplant: 1 × Rotax 912ULS four cylinder, liquid and air-cooled, four stroke aircraft engine, 75 kW (101 hp)
- Propellers: 3-bladed constant speed propeller

Performance

- Maximum speed: 310 km/h (190 mph, 170 kn)
- Cruise speed: 270 km/h (170 mph, 150 kn)
- Stall speed: 65 km/h (40 mph, 35 kn)
- Never exceed speed: 370 km/h (230 mph, 200 kn)
- Range: 1,300 km (810 mi, 700 nmi)

== See also ==
- Blackshape Prime, another design derived from the Millennium Master
