= Alpi Aviation =

Italian light aircraft manufacturer

Coordinates: 45.9859298°N 12.6536748°E

Alpi Aviation srl
- Company type: Privately held company
- Industry: Aerospace
- Headquarters: Pordenone, Italy
- Products: Kit aircraft Unmanned aerial vehicles
- Owner: RedFish LongTerm Capital
- Website: www.alpiaviation.com

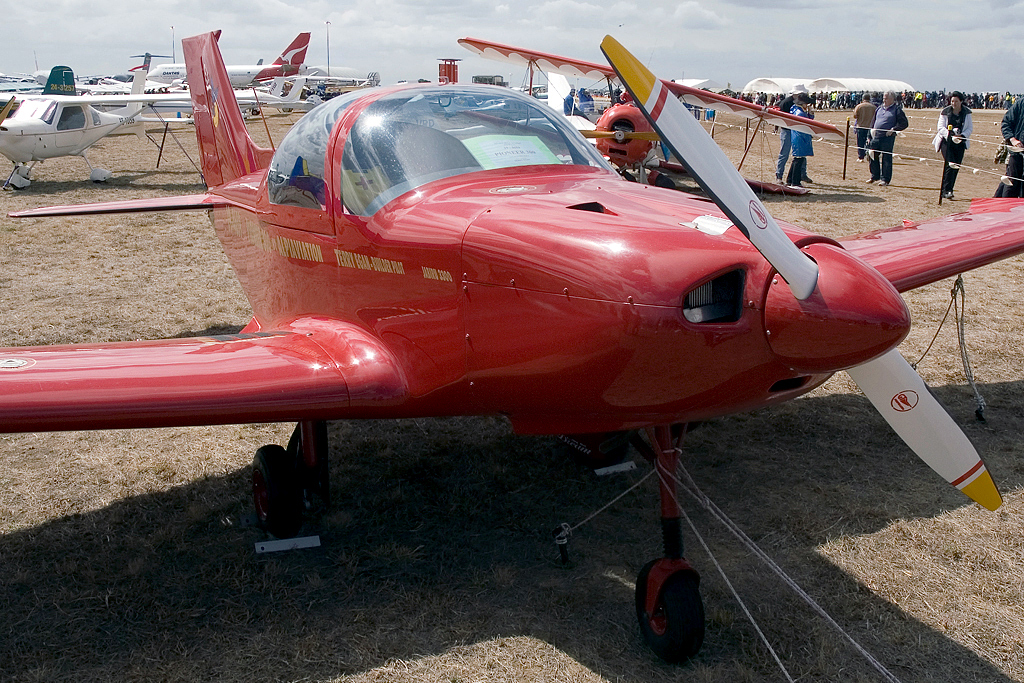
Alpi Pioneer 300

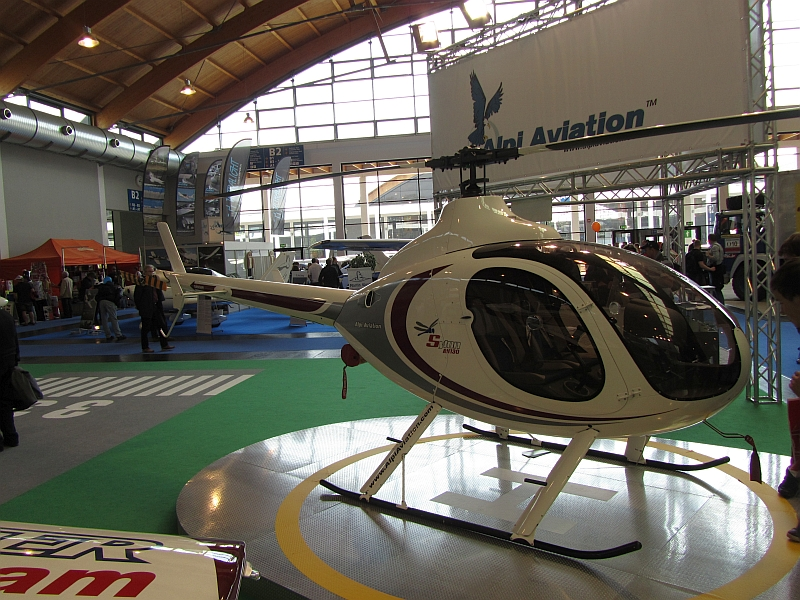
Alpi Syton AH 130 helicopter

Alpi Aviation srl (English: Alps Aviation Limited) is an Italian aircraft manufacturer based in Pordenone. It specializes in the design and manufacture of light aircraft in the form of kits for amateur construction and ready-to-fly aircraft in the European Fédération Aéronautique Internationale microlight category.

The company produces a range of both fixed-wing and rotary-wing aircraft, both manned and unmanned. These include the Alpi Pioneer 200 and 230, the 300, the aerobatic 330 microlights and the four seat 400 kit aircraft. The 200 and 300 series are built from a combination of wood and composites.

Alpi Aviation also manufactures the Syton AH 130 turbine-powered helicopter which is derived from the Rotorway Exec. It also markets the Alpi Strix-C fixed-wing mini unmanned aerial vehicle and the Alpi Sixton-A rotary-wing micro unmanned aerial vehicle.

In October 2025, it was reported that RedFish LongTerm Capital Spa, through a subsidiary, had completed the purchase of the firm, in a deal valued at €4 million.

== Aircraft ==
Summary of aircraft built by Alpi Aviation
Model name	First flight	Number built	Type
Alpi Pioneer 200			Two seat microlight aircraft
Alpi Pioneer 230			Two seat microlight aircraft
Alpi Pioneer 300			Two seat microlight aircraft
Alpi Pioneer 300 Kite			Two seat light sport aircraft
Alpi Pioneer 330			Two seat aerobatic microlight aircraft
Alpi Pioneer 400			Four seat microlight aircraft
Alpi Syton AH 130			Two seat turbine helicopter
Alpi Strix-C			Mini fixed-wing unmanned aerial vehicle
Alpi Sixton-A			Micro rotary-wing unmanned aerial vehicle
