= Alpi Pioneer 300 =

Italian ultralight aircraft

Pioneer 300
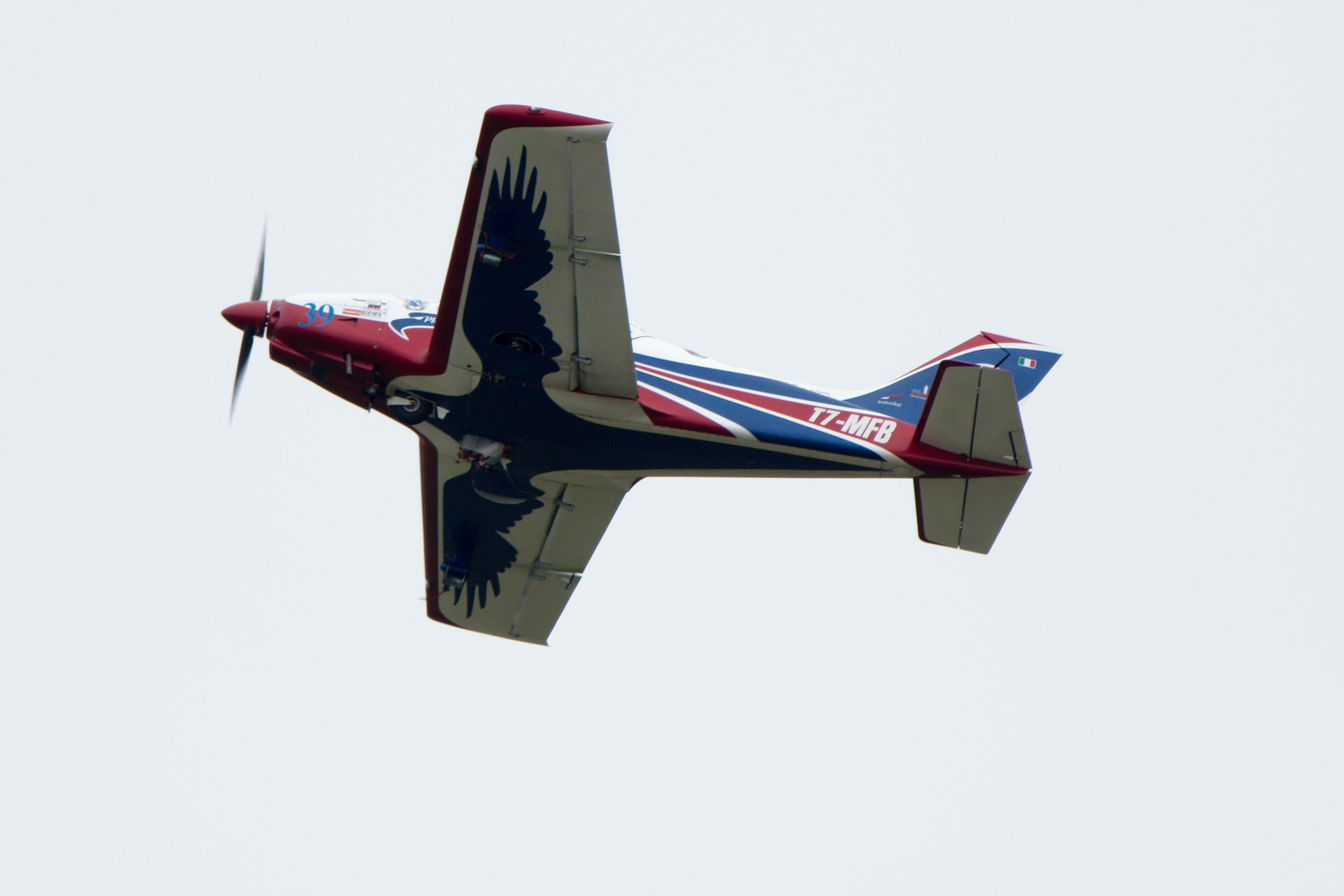
- Pioneer 300 of Alpi Aviation at ILA 2010

General information
- Type: Ultralight aircraft and Light-sport aircraft
- National origin: Italy
- Manufacturer: Alpi Aviation
- Status: In production

History
- Developed from: Vidor Champion V
- Variant: Alpi Pioneer 300 Kite

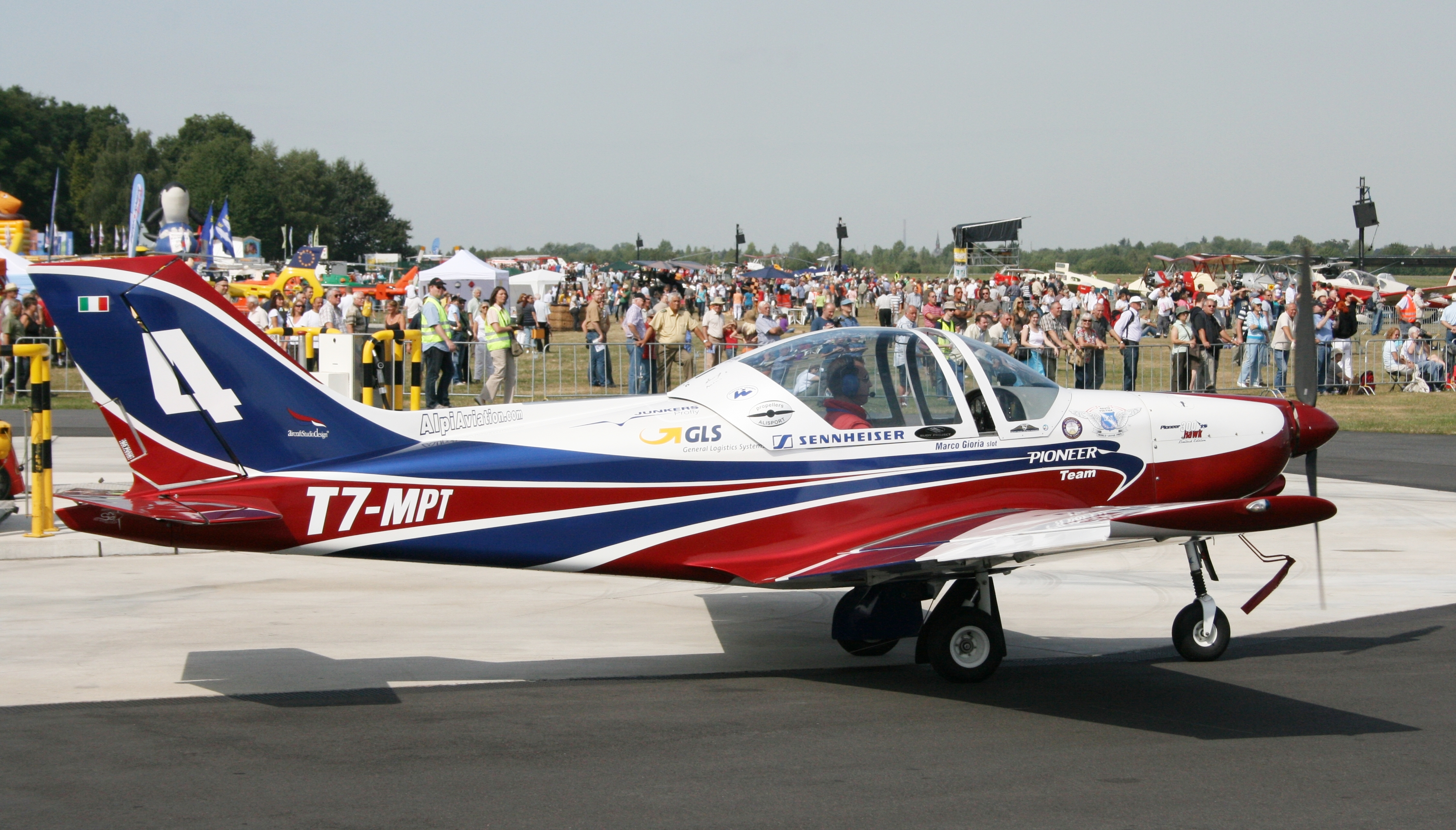
Alpi Aviation Pioneer 330

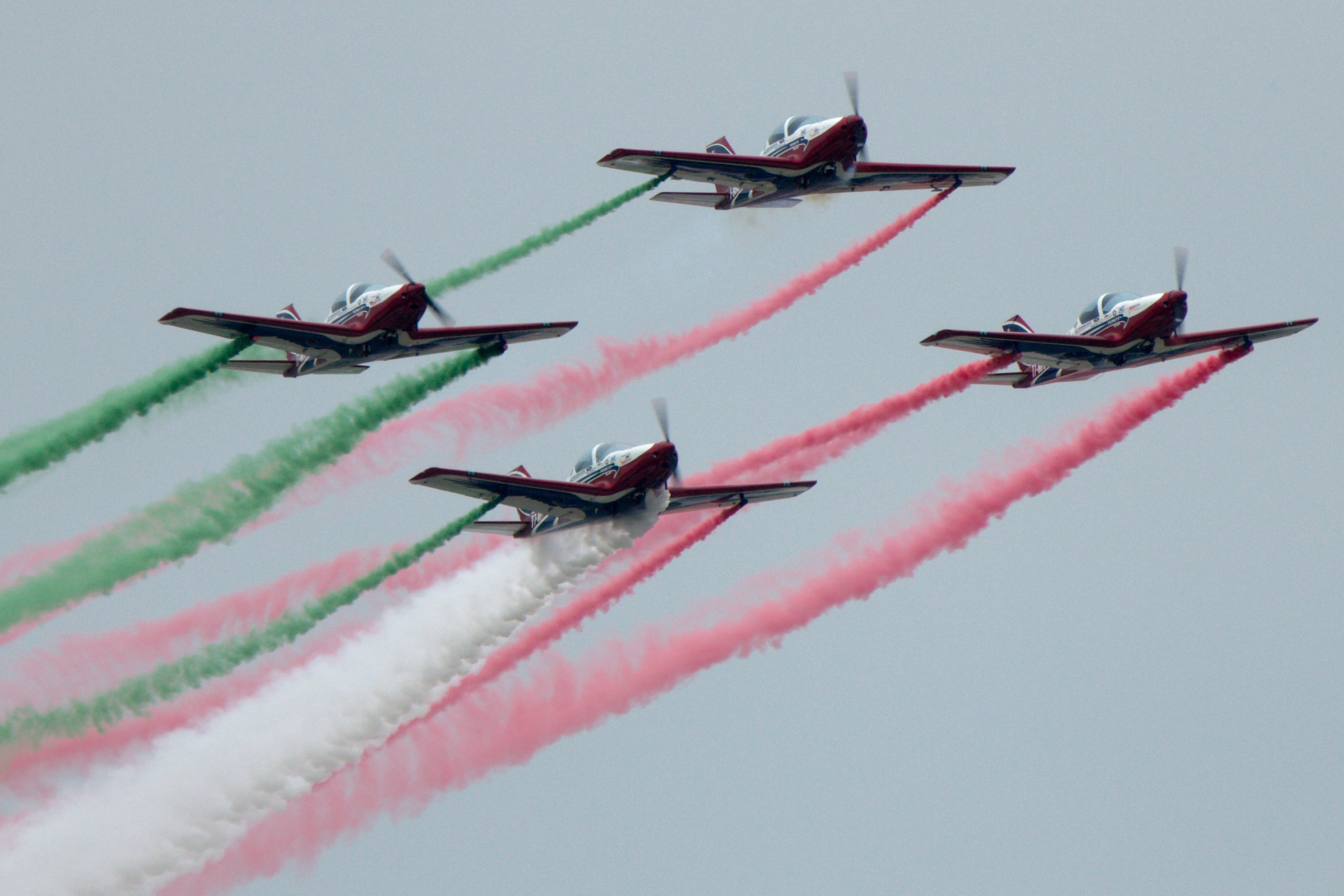
Alpi Aviation Pioneer 330s

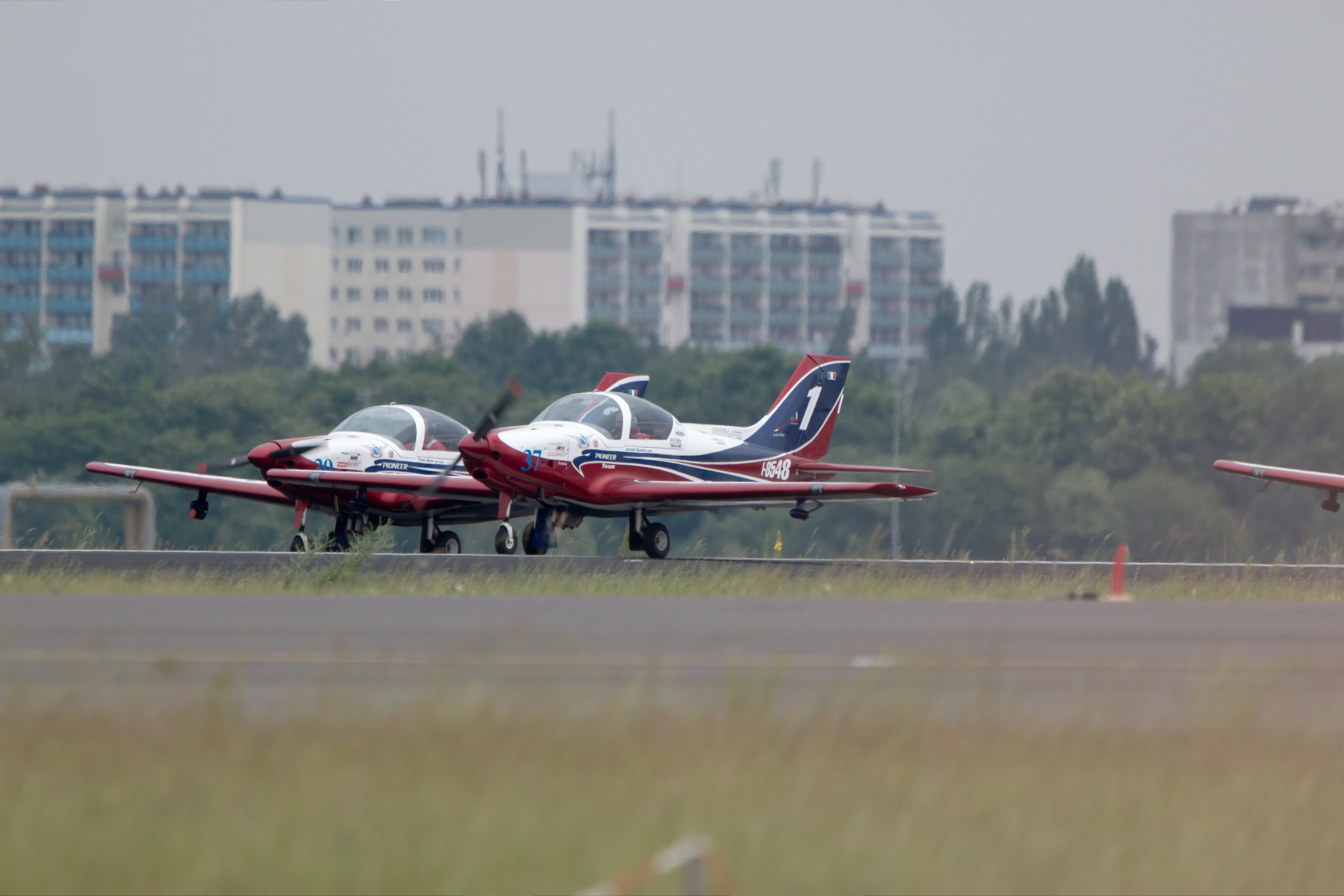
Alpi Aviation Pioneer 300s

The Alpi Pioneer 300 is an Italian ultralight and light-sport aircraft, designed and produced by Alpi Aviation, of Pordenone. The aircraft is supplied as a kit for amateur construction or as a complete ready-to-fly-aircraft.

== Design and development ==
The Pioneer 300 was derived from the Asso V Champion and designed to comply with the Fédération Aéronautique Internationale microlight rules, as well as the US light-sport aircraft rules. It features a cantilever low-wing, a two-seats-in-side-by-side configuration enclosed cockpit under a bubble canopy, a choice of fixed or retractable tricycle landing gear and a single engine in tractor configuration. The fixed landing gear version is intended for the US light-sport aircraft category that does not permit retractable gear on landplanes but it is also common in Europe.

The aircraft is made with a wooden frame, covered with composite skin panels. Its 8.10 m (26.6 ft) span wing is tapered in planform. Standard engines available are the 100 hp (75 kW) Rotax 912ULS, 141 hp Rotax 915iS and 160 hp Rotax 916 iS.

In the past they were also installed 85 hp (63 kW) Jabiru 2200 and 120 hp (89 kW) Jabiru 3300.

== Variants ==
Pioneer 300 Standard
Base model, standard engine is the 100 hp (75 kW) Rotax 912ULS.
Pioneer 300 Hawk
Model with upgraded canopy and interior, with plywood wing skins and oleo strut suspension.
Model with fixed gear and gross weight of 560 kg (1,235 lb) for the US light-sport aircraft market.
Pioneer 300 Turbo
Model with luxury interior, carbon fibre instrument panel and Rotax 914 turbocharged (914T) engine of 115 hp (86 kW) giving a cruise speed of 265 km/h (165 mph).
Pioneer 330 Acro
Aerobatic model, with inverted-capable version of the 100 hp (75 kW) Rotax 912ULS and a strengthened airframe with flight load factors of +6/-3g.

=== Current variants ===
As of January 2024

Pioneer 300
Retractable landing gear with a cruising speed of 250 km/h (160 mph) using a 100 hp (75 kW) Rotax 912ULS engine. The 115 hp (86 kW) Rotax 914T and 140 hp (100 kW) 915iS engines are also offered.
Pioneer 300 FG
Fixed landing gear with a cruising speed of 222 km/h (138 mph) using a Rotax 912ULS engine.
Pioneer 300 Griffon
Luxury version with a wider and higher cabin, electrically adjustable seats and improved aerodynamics and soundproofing. With retractable landing gear, it is offered with a Rotax 912ULS engine giving a cruising speed of 250 km/h (160 mph) or a 915iS which gives a cruising speed of 330 km/h (210 mph).

The Pioneer 330 Acro is also available.

== Specifications (Pioneer 300) ==
Data from Bayerl & Tacke

General characteristics

- Crew: one
- Capacity: one passenger
- Wingspan: 8.10 m (26 ft 7 in)
- Wing area: 11.0 m^{2} (118 sq ft)
- Empty weight: 285 kg (628 lb)
- Gross weight: 560 kg (1,235 lb)
- Fuel capacity: 80 litres (18 imp gal; 21 US gal)
- Powerplant: 1 × Rotax 912ULS four cylinder, liquid and air-cooled, four stroke, 75 kW (100 hp)
- Propellers: 2-bladed composite

Performance

- Maximum speed: 270 km/h (170 mph, 150 kn)
- Cruise speed: 250 km/h (160 mph, 130 kn)
- Stall speed: 60 km/h (37 mph, 32 kn)
- Rate of climb: 8 m/s (1,600 ft/min)
- Wing loading: 42.95 kg/m^{2} (8.80 lb/sq ft)
