= Vidor Champion V =

Italian homebuilt light aircraft

Champion V
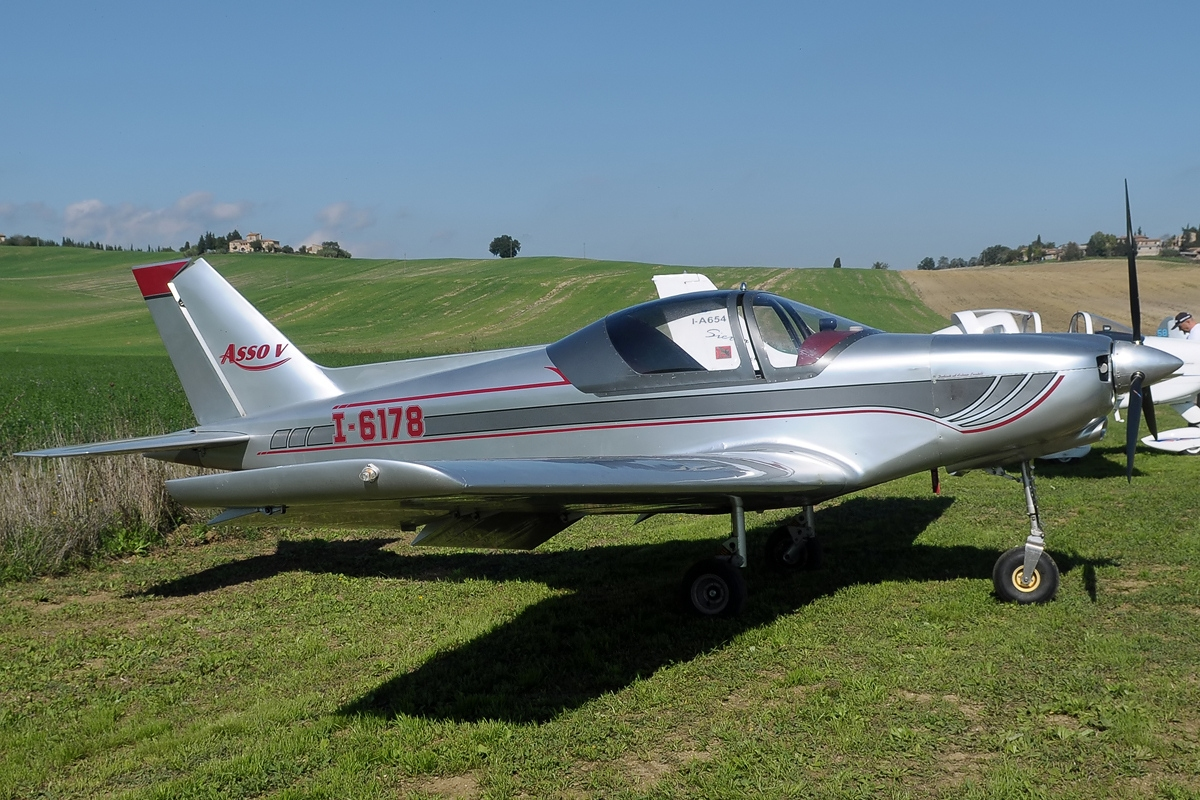

General information
- Type: Homebuilt aircraft
- National origin: Italy
- Designer: Giuseppe Vidor
- Status: Plans available (2014)

History
- First flight: 10 June 1995
- Variant: Alpi Pioneer 300

The Vidor Champion V is an Italian homebuilt aircraft that was designed by Giuseppe Vidor, first flying on 10 June 1995. The aircraft is supplied in the form of plans for amateur construction. It is also known as the Asso Aerei V Champion.

The Champion V was developed into the Alpi Pioneer 300, with the addition of composite skin.

== Design and development ==
The Champion V features a cantilever low-wing, a two-seats-in-side-by-side configuration enclosed cockpit under a bubble canopy, fixed or optionally retractable tricycle landing gear and a single engine in tractor configuration.

The aircraft is made from wood, with its flying surfaces covered in doped aircraft fabric. Its 8.321 m (27.3 ft) span wing mounts flaps and has a wing area of 11 m^{2} (120 sq ft). The wings are removable in about 15 minutes for ground transport or storage. The cabin width is 42 in (110 cm). The acceptable power range is 75 to 100 hp (56 to 75 kW) and the standard engine used is the 75 hp (56 kW) Volkswagen air-cooled engine four cylinder, air-cooled, four stroke automotive conversion powerplant.

The Champion V has a typical empty weight of 272 kg (600 lb) and a gross weight of 480 kg (1,058.2 lb), giving a useful load of 208 kg (459 lb). With full fuel of 49 litres (11 imp gal; 13 US gal) the payload for the pilot, passenger and baggage is 173 kg (381 lb).

The manufacturer estimates the construction time from the supplied kit as 1500 hours.

== Operational history ==
By 1998 the company reported that 15 kits had been sold and three aircraft were completed and flying.

In January 2014 one example was registered in the United States with the Federal Aviation Administration.

== Specifications (Champion V retractable) ==
Data from AeroCrafter

General characteristics

- Crew: one
- Capacity: one passenger
- Length: 6.10 m (20.00 ft)
- Wingspan: 8.32 m (27.30 ft)
- Wing area: 11 m^{2} (120 sq ft)
- Empty weight: 272 kg (600 lb)
- Gross weight: 480 kg (1,058 lb)
- Fuel capacity: 49 litres (11 imp gal; 13 US gal)
- Powerplant: 1 × Volkswagen air-cooled engine four cylinder, air-cooled, four stroke automotive conversion engine, 56 kW (75 hp)
- Propellers: 2-bladed wooden

Performance

- Maximum speed: 230 km/h (140 mph, 120 kn)
- Cruise speed: 201 km/h (125 mph, 109 kn)
- Stall speed: 64 km/h (40 mph, 35 kn) flaps down
- Range: 720 km (450 mi, 390 nmi)
- Rate of climb: 4.1 m/s (800 ft/min)
- Wing loading: 43 kg/m^{2} (8.8 lb/sq ft)
