= Blackshape Prime =

Italian ultralight aircraft

Prime
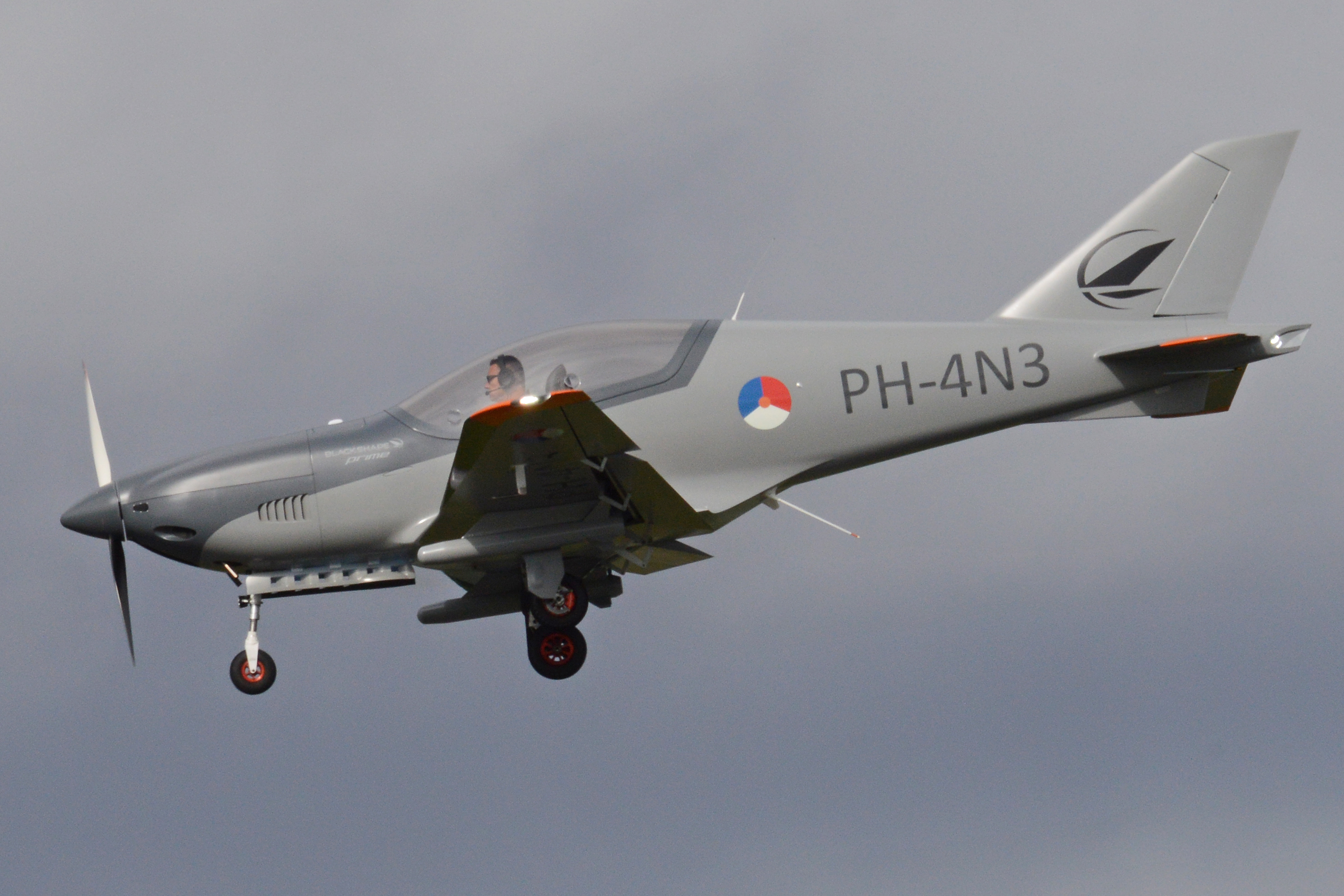

General information
- Type: Ultralight aircraft
- National origin: Italy
- Manufacturer: Blackshape srl
- Status: In production

History
- Introduction date: 2009
- First flight: 2007
- Developed from: Millennium Master

The Blackshape Prime is an Italian ultralight aircraft, produced by Blackshape srl, the company founded in Monopoli by Luciano Belviso and Angelo Petrosillo. The aircraft first flew in 2007 and was introduced at the Aero show held in Friedrichshafen in 2009. It is supplied as a complete ready-to-fly-aircraft.

== Design and development ==
The Prime started as the Millennium Master, but the design was later acquired and further developed by Blackshape, however the exterior is largely unchanged from the Millennium Master's. The aircraft was designed to comply with the Fédération Aéronautique Internationale microlight rules. It features a cantilever low-wing, a two-seats-in-tandem enclosed cockpit under a bubble canopy, retractable tricycle landing gear and a single engine in tractor configuration.

The aircraft is made from pre-preg carbon fibre, with an aluminium and steel structural frame. Its 7.94 m (26.0 ft) span wing has an area of 9.96 m^{2} (107.2 sq ft) and double slotted flaps. It is stressed to +4/-2g. The standard engine available is the 100 hp (75 kW) Rotax 912ULS four-stroke powerplant, driving a two bladed constant speed propeller, which gives it a maximum level speed of 300 km/h (162 kn) and a cruise speed of 275 km/h (148 kn). The 115 hp (86 kW) Rotax 914 is also available as an option, as is the 141 hp (105 kW) Rotax 915 iS.

The rear seat is mounted a few inches higher than the front seat, with a small baggage compartment behind the headrest. The aircraft has dual controls with centre sticks, conventional rudder pedals and throttle levers. Avionics include 10 in (254 mm) Dynon SkyView panel, which is standard only in the front seat, with a back seat installation available as a factory option. A two-axis Garmin autopilot is also optional.

== Variants ==
BK100
Base model with a 100 hp (75 kW) Rotax 912ULS engine and MT-Propeller MTV-33-1A two-bladed, variable pitch propeller; giving 5.6 m/s (1100 ft/min) climb rate, 260 km/h (162 mph) cruise speed, with a 1,260 km (783 mi) range. Originally named the BS100.
BK100 T
Model with a turbocharged 115 hp (86 kW) Rotax 914UL engine and an MTV-33-1A propeller, giving a 7.4 m/s (1450 ft/min) climb rate, a maximum cruise speed of 273 km/h (170 mph), with a 1,204 km (748 mi) range. Originally named the BS115.
BK100 iS
Model with a 141 hp (105 kW) Rotax 915 iS engine and an MTV-34-1A propeller, giving a climb rate of 8.6 m/s (1700 ft/min), a maximum cruise speed of 344 km/h (214 mph) and a range of 926 km (575 mi).

== Specifications (Prime BK100) ==
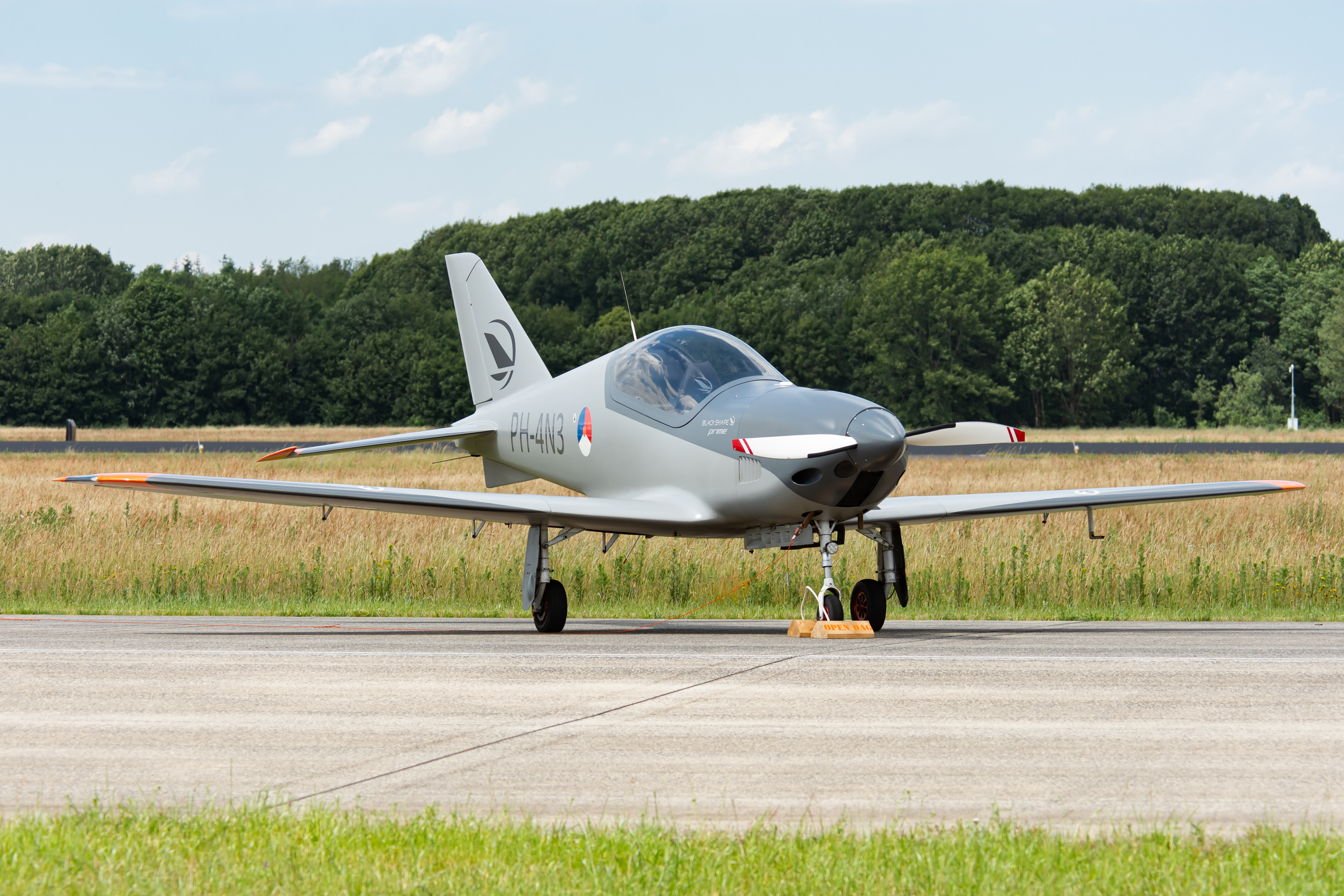
Blackshape Prime

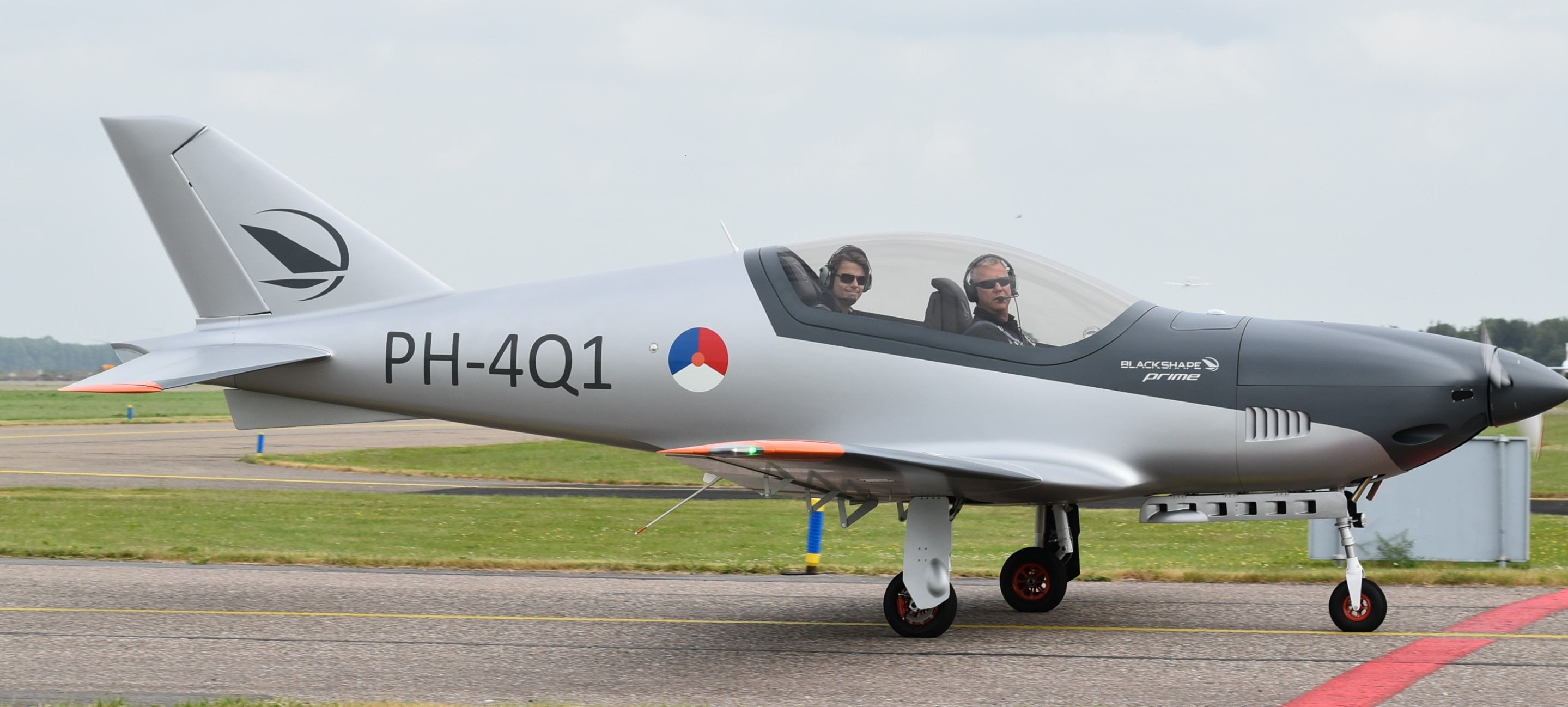
Blackshape Prime

Data from Bayerl, Tacke and Blackshape

General characteristics

- Crew: one
- Capacity: one passenger
- Length: 7.18 m (23 ft 7 in)
- Wingspan: 7.94 m (26 ft 1 in)
- Height: 2.41 m (7 ft 11 in)
- Wing area: 9.51 m^{2} (102.4 sq ft)
- Empty weight: 296.5 kg (654 lb)
- Gross weight: 472.5 kg (1,042 lb)
- Fuel capacity: 66 litres (15 imp gal; 17 US gal)
- Powerplant: 1 × Rotax 912ULS four cylinder, liquid and air-cooled, four stroke aircraft engine, 75 kW (101 hp)
- Propellers: 2-bladed MT-Propeller MTV-33-1-A constant speed propeller

Performance

- Maximum speed: 300 km/h (190 mph, 160 kn)
- Cruise speed: 275 km/h (171 mph, 148 kn)
- Stall speed: 65 km/h (40 mph, 35 kn) flaps down
- Never exceed speed: 305 km/h (190 mph, 165 kn)
- Wing loading: 49.68 kg/m^{2} (10.18 lb/sq ft)

== See also ==
Related development

- Pelegrin Tarragon, another design based upon the Millennium Master

Aircraft of comparable role, configuration, and era

- Arion Lightning
- 3Xtrim 3X55 Trener
- Fantasy Air Allegro
- Flight Design CT
- Pipistrel Alpha Trainer
- Rans S-7 Courier
- Remos GX
- Shark.Aero Shark
- Tecnam P92
- TL-Ultralight Stream
- Van's Aircraft RV-12
