= Hydrogen-powered aircraft =

Type of airplane

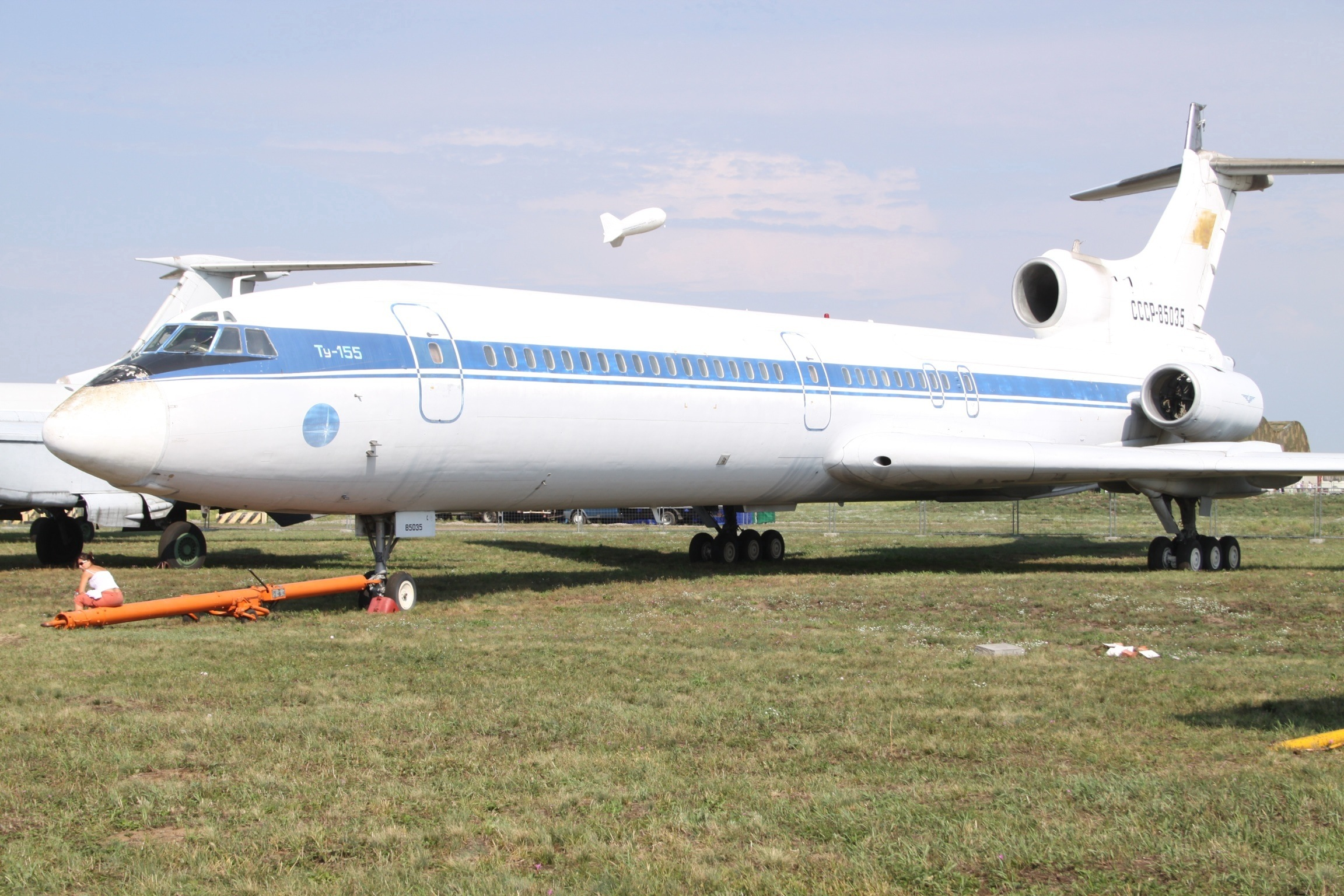
The partially hydrogen-powered Tu-155 prototype made its first flight on 15 April 1988.

A hydrogen-powered aircraft is an aeroplane that uses hydrogen fuel as a power source. Hydrogen can either be burned in a jet engine or another kind of internal combustion engine, or can be used to power a fuel cell to generate electricity to power an electric propulsor. It cannot be stored in a traditional wet wing, and hydrogen tanks have to be housed in the fuselage or be supported by the wing.

Hydrogen, which can be produced from low-carbon power and can produce zero emissions, can reduce the environmental impact of aviation. Airbus plans to launch a first commercial hydrogen-powered aircraft by 2040–2045, while Boeing is less optimistic. McKinsey & Company forecast hydrogen aircraft entering the market in the late 2030s and scaling up through 2050, when they could account for a third of aviation's energy demand.

== Hydrogen properties ==
Energy density of fuels: horizontal per mass, vertical per volume. Kerosene is highlighted in red and hydrogen in blue.

Hydrogen has a specific energy of 119.9 MJ/kg, compared to ~43.5 MJ/kg for usual liquid fuels, 2.8 times higher. However, it has an energy density of 10.05 kJ/L at normal atmospheric pressure and temperature, compared to ~31,293 kJ/L for liquid fuels, 3,114 times lower. When pressurised to 690 bar (10,000 psi), it reaches 4,500 kJ/L, still 7 times lower than liquid fuels. Cooled at 20 K (−253 °C), liquid hydrogen has an energy density of 8,491 kJ/L, 3.7 times lower than liquid fuels.

== Aircraft design ==
The low volumetric energy density of hydrogen poses challenges when designing an aircraft, where weight and exposed surface area are critical. To reduce the size of the tanks, liquid hydrogen will be used, requiring cryogenic fuel tanks. Cylindrical tanks minimise surface for minimal thermal insulation weight, leading towards tanks in the fuselage rather than wet wings in conventional aircraft. Airplane volume and drag will be increased somewhat by larger fuel tanks. A larger fuselage adds more skin friction drag due to the extra wetted area. The extra tank weight is offset by dramatically lower liquid hydrogen fuel weight.

Gaseous hydrogen may be used for short-haul aircraft. Liquid hydrogen might be needed for long-haul aircraft.

Hydrogen's high specific energy means it would need less fuel weight for the same range, ignoring the repercussions of added volume and tank weight. As airliners have a fuel fraction of the Maximum Takeoff Weight MTOW between 26% for medium-haul to 45% for long-haul, maximum fuel weight could be reduced to 9% to 16% of the MTOW.

Fuel cells make sense for general aviation and regional aircraft but their engine efficiency is less than large gas turbines. They are more efficient than modern 7 to 90-passenger turboprop airliners such as the DASH 8. The efficiency of a hydrogen-fueled aircraft is a trade-off of the larger wetted area, lower fuel weight, and added tank weight, varying with the aircraft size. Hydrogen is suited for short-range airliners; its use in longer-range aircraft will require new aircraft designs.

Liquid hydrogen is one of the best coolants used in engineering, and precooled jet engines have been proposed to use this property for cooling the intake air of hypersonic aircraft, or even for cooling the aircraft's skin itself, particularly for scramjet-powered aircraft.

A study in the UK, NAPKIN (New Aviation, Propulsion Knowledge and Innovation Network), with collaboration from Heathrow Airport, Rolls-Royce, GKN Aerospace, and Cranfield Aerospace solutions, has investigated the potential of new hydrogen-powered aircraft designs to reduce the environmental impact of aviation. The aircraft designers have proposed a range of hydrogen-fuelled aircraft concepts, ranging from 7 to 90 seats, exploring the use of hydrogen with fuel cells and gas turbines to replace conventional aircraft engines powered by fossil fuels. The findings suggest that in the UK hydrogen-powered aircraft could be commercially viable for short-haul and regional flights by the second half of the 2020s with airlines potentially able to replace the entire UK regional fleet with hydrogen aircraft by 2040. However, the report highlighted that national supply, and the price of green liquid hydrogen relative to fossil kerosene are critical factors in determining uptake of hydrogen aircraft by airline operators. Modeling showed that, if hydrogen prices approach $1/kg, hydrogen aircraft uptake could cover almost 100% of the UK domestic market.

== Emissions and environmental impact ==
Hydrogen aircraft using a fuel cell design are zero emission in operation, whereas aircraft using hydrogen as a fuel for a jet engine or an internal combustion engine are zero emission for CO_{2} (a greenhouse gas which contributes to global climate change) but not for NO_{x} (a local air pollutant). The burning of hydrogen in air leads to the production of NO_{x}, i.e., the 2H_{2} + O_{2} → 2H_{2}O reaction in a nitrogen-rich environment also causes the production of NO_{x}. However, hydrogen combustion produces up to 90% less nitrogen oxides than kerosene fuel, and it eliminates the formation of particulate matter.

If hydrogen is available in quantity from low-carbon power such as wind or nuclear, its use in aircraft will produce fewer greenhouse gases than current aircraft: water vapor and a small amount of nitrogen oxide. However, as of 2021, less than 5% of all hydrogen produced is emissions free, and the majority comes from fossil fuels.

A 2020 study by the EU Clean Sky 2 and Fuel Cells and Hydrogen 2 Joint Undertakings found that hydrogen could power aircraft by 2035 for short-range aircraft. A short-range aircraft (< 2,000 km, 1,100 nmi) with hybrid Fuel cell/Turbines could reduce climate impact by 70–80% for a 20–30% additional cost, a medium-range airliner with H_{2} turbines could have a 50–60% reduced climate impact for a 30–40% overcost, and a long-range aircraft (> 7,000 km, 3,800 nmi) also with H_{2} turbines could reduce climate impact by 40–50% for a 40–50% additional cost. Research and development would be required, in aircraft technology and into hydrogen infrastructure, regulations and certification standards.

Water vapor is a greenhouse gas – in fact, most of the total greenhouse effect on earth is due to water vapor. However, in the troposphere the content of water vapor is not dominated by anthropogenic emissions but rather the natural water cycle as water does not long remain static in that layer of the atmosphere. This is different in the stratosphere which – absent human action – would be almost totally dry and still remains relatively devoid of water. If hydrogen is burned and the resulting water vapor is released at stratospheric heights (the cruising altitude of some commercial flights is within the stratosphere – supersonic flight takes place almost entirely at stratospheric altitude), the content of water vapor in the stratosphere is increased. Due to the long residence time of water vapor at those heights, the long term effects over years or even decades cannot be entirely discounted.

== History ==
=== Demonstrations ===
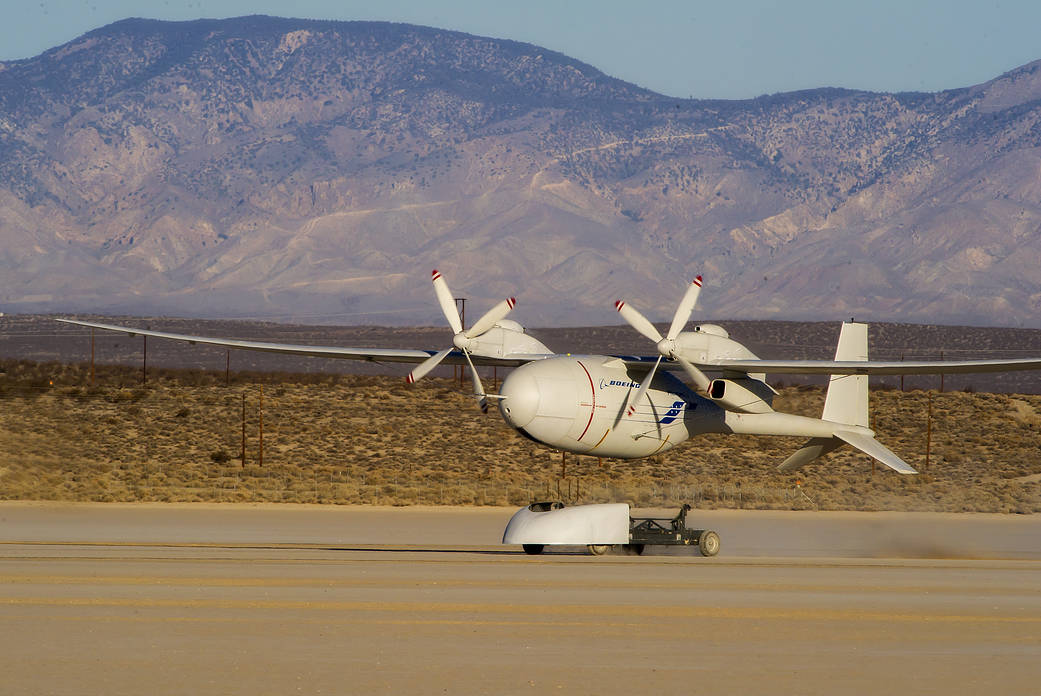
The hydrogen powered Boeing Phantom Eye UAV first flew on 1 June 2012.

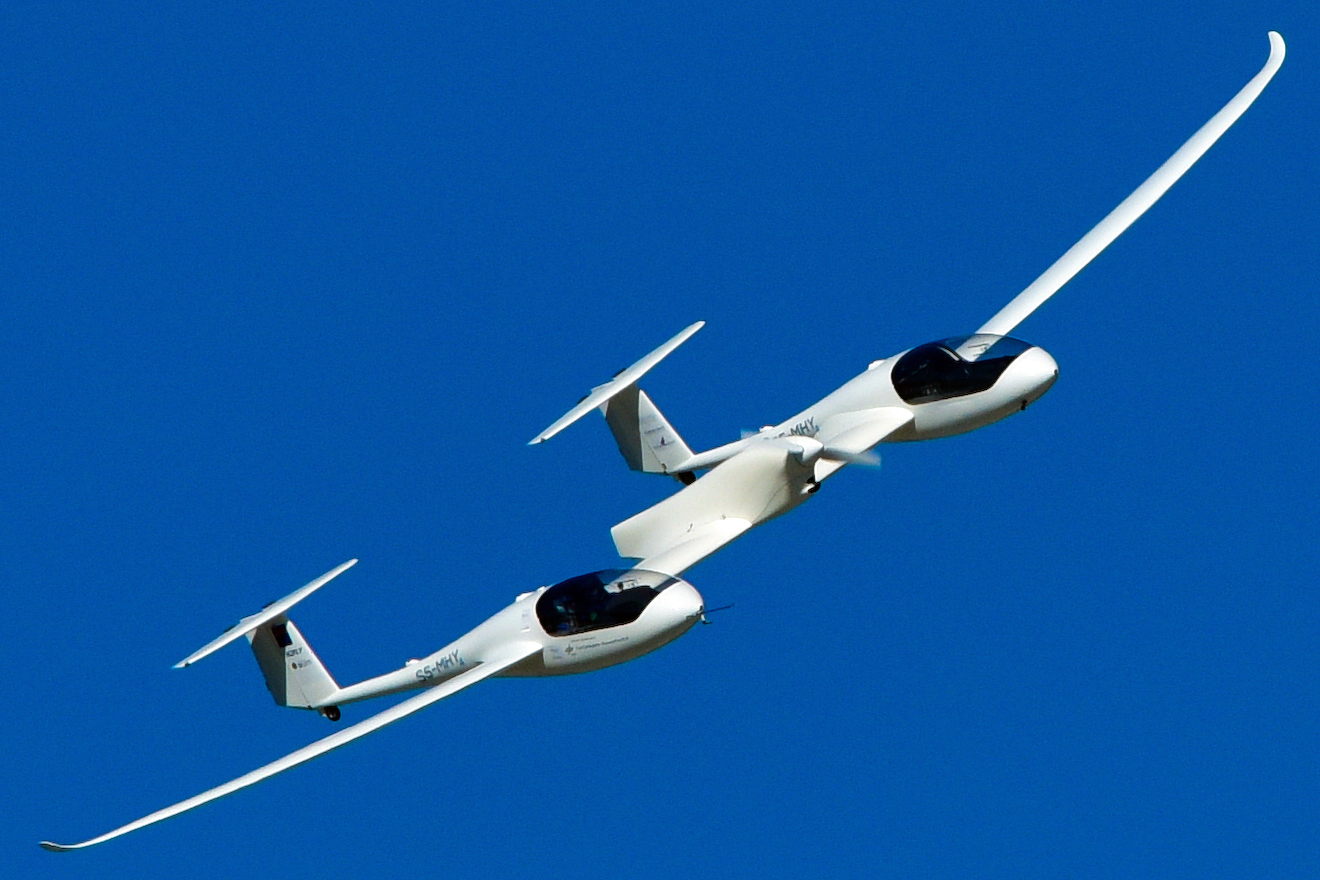
the hydrogen fuel cell-powered HY4 made its first flight in 2016.

In February 1957, a Martin B-57B of the NACA flew on hydrogen for 20 min for one of its two Wright J65 engines rather than jet fuel. On 15 April 1988, the Tu-155 had a hydrogen fuel tank installed in the fuselage, and used a hydrogen fuelled engine in one nacelle, the other two engines were standard an adapted Tu-154 airliner.

In 2025, the US Naval Research Laboratory (NRL) demonstrated a small, 5.6 lb hydrogen-powered UAV named "Spider Lion," which flew for 3 hours 19 minutes on about 1/2 ounce of compressed hydrogen gas. NRL later demonstrated the hydrogen-powered Ion Tiger UAV, which flew for 26 hours 2 minutes in 2009, and for 48 hours 1 minute in 2013.

Boeing converted a two-seat Diamond DA20 to run on a fuel cell designed and built by Intelligent Energy. It first flew on April 3, 2008. The Antares DLR-H2 is a hydrogen-powered airplane from Lange Aviation and the German aerospace center. In July 2010, Boeing unveiled its hydrogen powered Phantom Eye UAV, that uses two converted Ford Motor Company piston engines.

In 2010, the Rapid 200FC concluded six flight tests fueled by gaseous hydrogen. The aircraft and the electric and energy system was developed within the European Union's ENFICA-FC project coordinated by the Politecnico di Torino. Hydrogen gas is stored at 350 bar, feeding a 20 kW (27 hp) fuel cell powering a 40 kW (54 hp) electric motor along a 20 kW (27 hp) lithium polymer battery pack.

On January 11, 2011, an AeroVironment Global Observer unmanned aircraft completed its first flight powered by a hydrogen-fueled propulsion system.

Developed by H2Fly, which is a spinoff of Germany's DLR Institute of Engineering Thermodynamics. The DLR HY4 four-seater was powered by a hydrogen fuel cell. Its first flight took place on September 29, 2016.

The German company H2FLY built the HY4. The aircraft completed the world's first piloted flight of an electric aircraft powered by liquid hydrogen. It carried out four test flights from Maribor, Slovenia, using only liquid hydrogen to power its fuel-cell propulsion system. According to H2FLY, the use of cryogenically stored liquid hydrogen instead of a gaseous alternative enabled a doubling of the aircraft's range, from 750 km (466 miles) to approximately 1,500 km (932 miles), due to significantly lower tank weight and volume.

The HY4 can seat four passengers and features a twin-fuselage design. It has a maximum speed of 125 mph and a cruising speed of 90 mph.

It has the possibility to store 9 kg (20 lb) of hydrogen, 4x11 kW fuel cells and 2x10 kWh batteries.

On 19 January 2023, ZeroAvia flew its Dornier 228 testbed with one turboprop replaced by a prototype hydrogen-electric powertrain in the cabin, consisting of two fuel cells and a lithium-ion battery for peak power. The aim is to have a certifiable system by 2025 to power airframes carrying up to 19 passengers over 300 nmi (560 km).

On 2 March 2023, Universal Hydrogen flew a Dash 8 40-passenger testbed with one engine powered by their hydrogen-electric powertrain. The company has received an order from Connect Airlines to convert 75 ATR 72-600 with their hydrogen powertrains.

On 8 November 2023, Airbus flew a modified Schempp-Hirth Arcus-M glider, dubbed the Blue Condor, equipped with a hydrogen combustion engine for the first time, using hydrogen as its sole source of fuel.

On 24 June 2024, Joby Aviation's S4 eVTOL demonstrator, refitted with a hydrogen-electric powertrain in May, completed a record 523 miles non-stop flight, more than triple the range of the battery powered version. It landed with 10% liquid hydrogen fuel remaining in its cryogenic fuel tank, and the only in-flight emission was water vapor. A hydrogen fuel cell system provided the power for the six electric rotors of the eVTOL during its flight, and a small battery provided added takeoff and landing power. The American aerospace company acquired German hydrogen flight developer H2FLY, known for its advancements in hydrogen-electric propulsion. Based on this technology, Joby integrated similar liquid hydrogen (LH2) systems into a hydrogen-electric vertical take-off and landing eVTOL demonstrator, which is SHy4. On 11 July, Joby Aviation announced that its demonstrator aircraft had completed a 523-mile flight in June, more than five times the range achievable using the company's standard battery electric powertrain. The pre-production prototype had a liquid hydrogen fuel tank and a hydrogen fuel cell system. According to its manufacturers, the aircraft, which had previously flown more than 25,000 miles using battery electric power, landed with 10 per cent of its hydrogen fuel load remaining. Joby's engineering team collaborated with hydrogen propulsion specialists H2Fly, based in Stuttgart.

=== Aircraft projects ===
In 1975, Lockheed prepared a study of liquid hydrogen fueled subsonic transport aircraft for NASA Langley, exploring airliners carrying 130 passengers over 2,780 km (1500 nmi); 200 passengers over 5,560 km (3,000 nmi); and 400 passengers over 9,265 km (5,000 nmi).

Between April 2000 and May 2002, the European Commission funded half of the Airbus-led Cryoplane Study, assessing the configurations, systems, engines, infrastructure, safety, environmental compatibility and transition scenarios. Multiple configurations were envisioned: a 12-passenger business jet with a 3,500 nmi (6,500 km) range, regional airliner for 44 passengers over 1,500 nmi (2,800 km) and 70 passengers over 2,000 nmi (3,700 km), a medium range narrowbody aircraft for 185 passengers over 4,000 nmi (7,400 km) and long range widebody aircraft for 380 to 550 passengers over 8,500 nmi (15,700 km).

In September 2020, Airbus presented three ZEROe hydrogen-fuelled concepts aiming for commercial service by 2035: a 100-passenger turboprop, a 200-passenger turbofan, and a futuristic design based around a blended wing body. The aircraft are powered by gas turbines rather than fuel cells.

In December 2021, the UK Aerospace Technology Institute (ATI) presented its FlyZero study of cryogenic liquid hydrogen used in gas turbines for a 279-passenger design with 5,250 nmi (9,720 km) of range. ATI is supported by Airbus, Rolls-Royce, GKN, Spirit, General Electric, Reaction Engines, Easyjet, NATS, Belcan, Eaton, Mott MacDonald and the MTC.

In August 2021 the UK Government claimed it was the first to have a Hydrogen Strategy. This report included a suggested strategy for hydrogen powered aircraft along with other transport modes.

In March 2022, FlyZero detailed its three concept aircraft:

- the 75-seat FZR-1E regional airliner has six electric propulsors powered by fuel cells, a size comparable to the ATR 72 with a larger fuselage diameter at 3.5 m (11 ft) compared to 2.8 m (9 ft 2 in) to accommodate hydrogen storage, for a 325 kn (602 km/h) cruise and an 800 nmi (1,500 km) range;
- its FZN-1E narrowbody has rear-mounted hydrogen-burning turbofans, a T-tail and nose-mounted canards, a 10 m (33 ft) longer fuselage than the Airbus A320neo becoming up to 1 m (3 ft 3 in) wider at the rear to accommodate two cryogenic fuel tanks, and a larger wingspan requiring folding wing-tips for a 2,400 nmi (4,400 km) range with a 450 kn (830 km/h) cruise;
- the small widebody FZM-1G is comparable to the Boeing 767-200ER, flying 279 passengers over 5,750 nmi (10,650 km), with a 6 m (20 ft) wide fuselage diameter closer to the A350 or 777X, a 52 m (171 ft) wingspan within airport gate limits, underwing engines and tanks in front of the wing.

=== Propulsion projects ===
In March 2021, Cranfield Aerospace Solutions announced the Project Fresson switched from batteries to hydrogen for the nine-passenger Britten-Norman Islander retrofit for a September 2022 demonstration. Project Fresson is supported by the Aerospace Technology Institute in partnership with the UK Department for Business, Energy & Industrial Strategy and Innovate UK.

Pratt & Whitney wants to associate its geared turbofan architecture with its Hydrogen Steam Injected, Inter‐Cooled Turbine Engine (HySIITE) project, to avoid carbon dioxide emissions, reduce NO_{x} emissions by 80%, and reduce fuel consumption by 35% compared with the current jet-fuel PW1100G, for a service entry by 2035 with a compatible airframe. On 21 February 2022, the US Department of Energy through the OPEN21 scheme run by its Advanced Research Projects Agency-Energy (ARPA-E) awarded P&W $3.8 million for a two-year early stage research initiative, to develop the combustor and the heat exchanger used to recover water vapour in the exhaust stream, injected into the combustor to increase its power, and into the compressor as an intercooler, and into the turbine as a coolant.

In February 2022, Airbus announced a demonstration of a liquid hydrogen-fueled turbofan, with CFM International modifying the combustor, fuel system and control system of a GE Passport, mounted on a fuselage pylon on an A380 prototype, for a first flight expected within five years.

In April 2025, startup Green Aero Propulsion demonstrated its Blue Dragon turbojet, the first hydrogen based aero engine in India. Key components were additively manufactured, like single piece metal 3D printed liners and critical components. Green Aero previously researched hydrogen injectors and combustion chambers with dedicated test rigs featuring optical access into the combustion chamber enabling a real-time analysis of flame stabilization and flame flash back phenomenon.

In July 2026, Airbus and MTU Aero Engines announced that they intend to establish a joint venture dedicated to the development and commercialisation of a fully electric hydrogen fuel cell engine.

=== Decline ===
By 2025, multiple projects were scaled down or terminated as major changes are needed in infrastructure, while hydrogen is also used for power to liquid synthetic sustainable aviation fuel (SAF). Lacking new funding, Universal Hydrogen closed down in June 2024 while Airbus pushed back its hydrogen-powered projects by five to 10 years, and Embraer followed.

== Proposed aircraft and prototypes ==
=== Historical ===
- Lockheed CL-400 Suntan, 1950's concept, dropped for the SR-71
- National Aerospace Plane, 1986–1993 concept with a scramjet, cancelled during development
- Tupolev Tu-155, 1988 modified Tupolev Tu-154 testbed, flew over 100 flights
- AeroVironment Global Observer, 2010-2011 fuel-cell powered drone demonstrator, performed 9 flights before crashing
- Boeing Phantom Eye, 2012-2016 piston engine powered drone demonstrator, flew 9 times with flights lasting up to 9 hours

=== Projects ===
- AeroDelft Phoenix, a student-led project at Delft University of Technology developing a hydrogen-electric conversion of the Sling 4.
- Airbus ZEROe, presented in late 2020, it aims to create four concept aircraft and launch the first commercial zero-emission aircraft, entering service by 2035
- Cellsius H2-Sling, a student project at ETH Zürich building a modified Sling HW with a hydrogen fuel cell propulsion system.
- DLR Smartfish, two seat experimental lifting body; based on the previous Hyfish model.
- DLR HY4, operated by DLR spinoff H2Fly, completed the world's first piloted electric flights powered by liquid hydrogen in 2023
- Project Fresson, a Britten-Norman Islander retrofit.
- Reaction Engines Skylon, orbital hydrogen fuelled spaceplane.
- Reaction Engines A2, antipodal hypersonic jet airliner.
- Taifun 17H_{2}, a student project retrofitting a Valentin Taifun 17E and 17EII with a gaseous hydrogen fuel cell electric propulsion system.
- Universal Hydrogen (fuel cell powered Dash 8-300) the largest aircraft ever to cruise mainly on hydrogen power
- ZeroAvia HyFlyer (fuel-cell powered Piper PA-46 demonstrator)
- ZeroAvia (fuel-cell powered Dornier 228x)

== See also ==
- Electric aircraft
- Aviation fuel#Emerging aviation fuels
- Airships using hydrogen as a lifting gas rather than fuel
