= Fresson =

Fresson is a surname. Notable people with the surname include:

- Bernard Fresson (1931–2002), French actor primarily in film
- E. E. Fresson, OBE (1891–1963), ("Ted" Fresson), British engineer and aviation pioneer
- Max Fresson (1912–1996), French equestrian
- Théodore-Henri Fresson (1865–1951), agronomist

== See also ==
- Project Fresson, the development by Cranfield Aerospace of an electric propulsion system
- Frasson
- Frisson
