= Sonaca 200 =

Belgian training aircraft

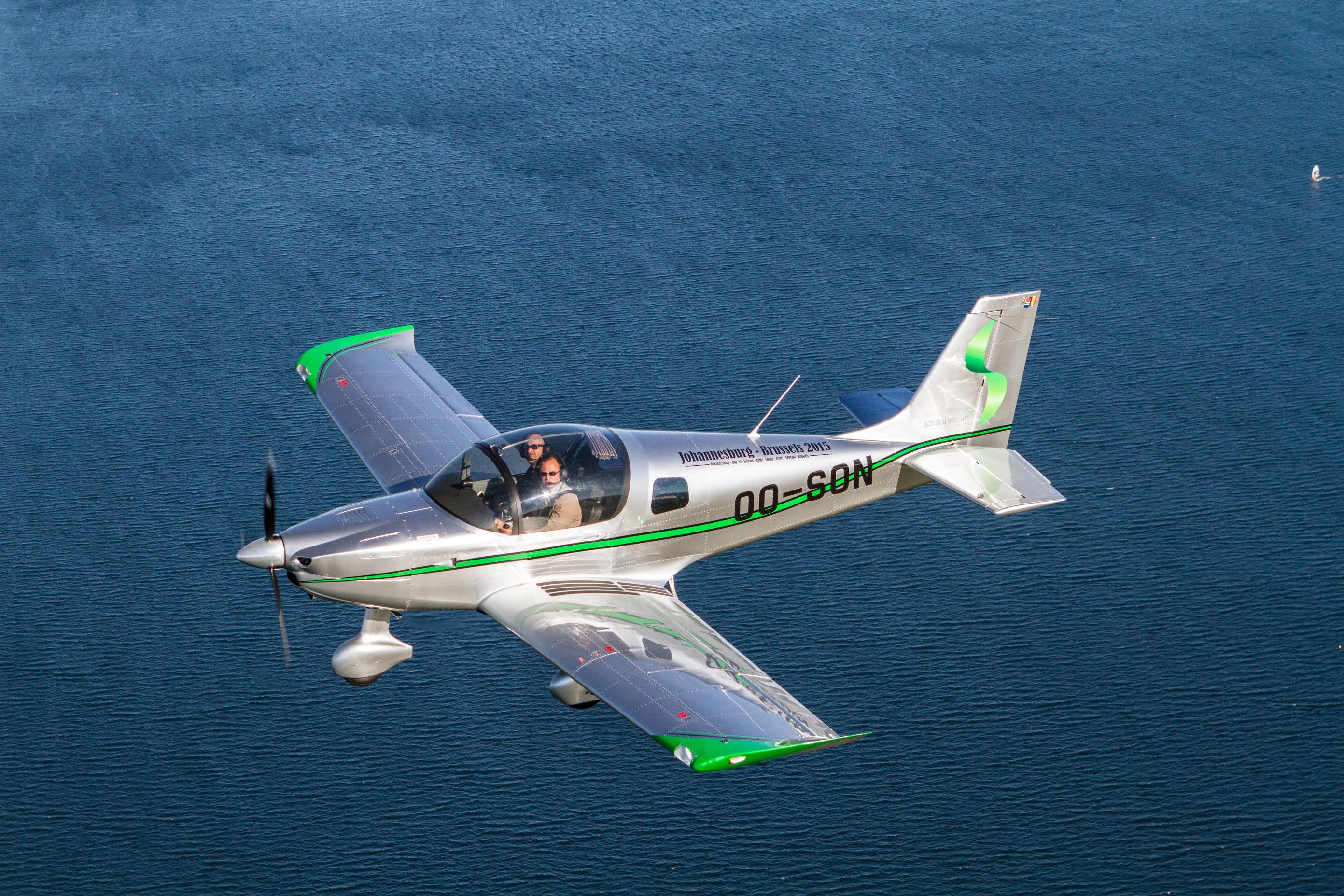
- Sonaca 200's initial demonstrator assembled in 2015

General information
- Type: Very Light Aircraft
- Manufacturer: Sonaca Aircraft
- Status: Production suspended
- Number built: 57

History
- Manufactured: 2017-2022
- Introduction date: 2017
- First flight: 2017
- Developed from: The Airplane Factory Sling 2

The Sonaca 200 is a Belgian two-seat training aircraft designed and built by Sonaca Aircraft.

Production was started in 2017 and halted in 2022, with 57 aircraft completed.

== Design and development ==
The Sonaca 200 is a low-wing cantilever monoplane made from aluminium alloy, it has an enclosed cabin with two side-by-side seats. It is powered by a 115 hp Rotax 914 and has a fixed tricycle landing gear.

In late 2015, the Sonaca group announced the creation of the subsidiary “Sonaca Aircraft” dedicated to the development, certification and market launch of a new training aircraft based on TAF's Sling 2. Later the aircraft was renamed as Sonaca 200. The single-engine two-seater, specifically designed for pilots' training and leisure flights, was certified in June 2018. Sonaca 200 is EASA-certified for a maximum take-off weight of 750 kg and a cruise speed of 115 knots. In addition to the obtention of the type certification, Sonaca Aircraft has obtained a Design Organisation Approval (DOA) and Production Organisations Approvals (POA) certification.

An initial demonstrator was assembled in April 2015, at Johannesburg by The Airplane Factory. In April 2017, Sonaca Aircraft unveiled the new version of the Sonaca 200 in which 80% of the structure has been redesigned compared to the initial "Amateur Construction" prototype version.

In 2018, after obtaining the Type Certification of the S200, Sonaca Aircraft announced the development of a Glass Cockpit variant, named the S201.

Production was halted in May 2022, after 57 aircraft had been completed. The company cited the effects of the ongoing COVID-19 pandemic on market demand as the main reason and noted that it had not been able to reach agreements with its suppliers. The company expected production demand would not recover before 2025 and will, in the meantime, focus on the production of sub-contracted aerostructures.

== Variants ==
S200
Production variant certified under EASA CS-VLA requirements with analogue flight instruments.

S201
Glass cockpit model certified in 2019, using Garmin G500 TXi suite.

== Specification ==
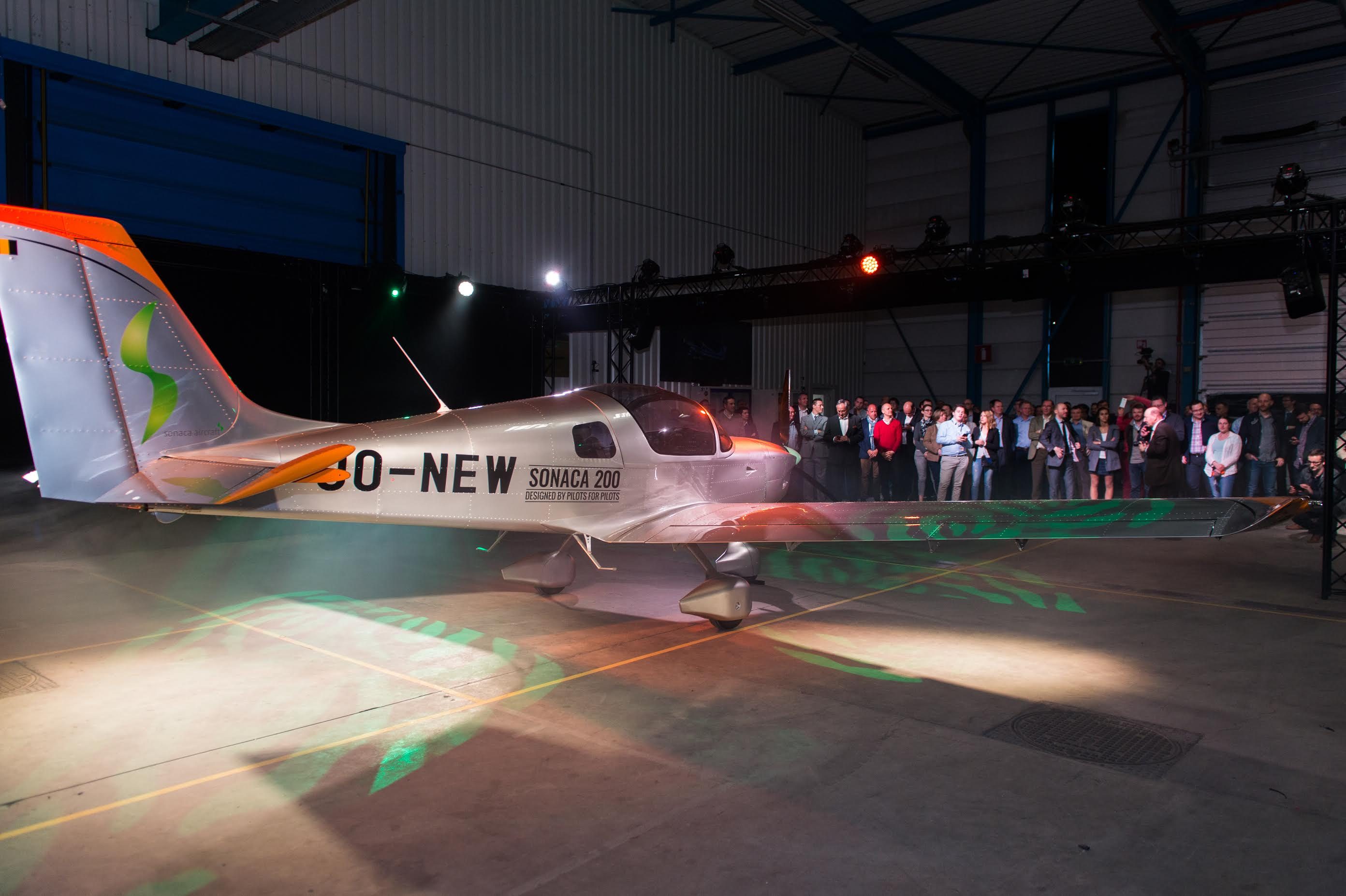
Roll out of the first Sonaca 200 produced by Sonaca Aircraft

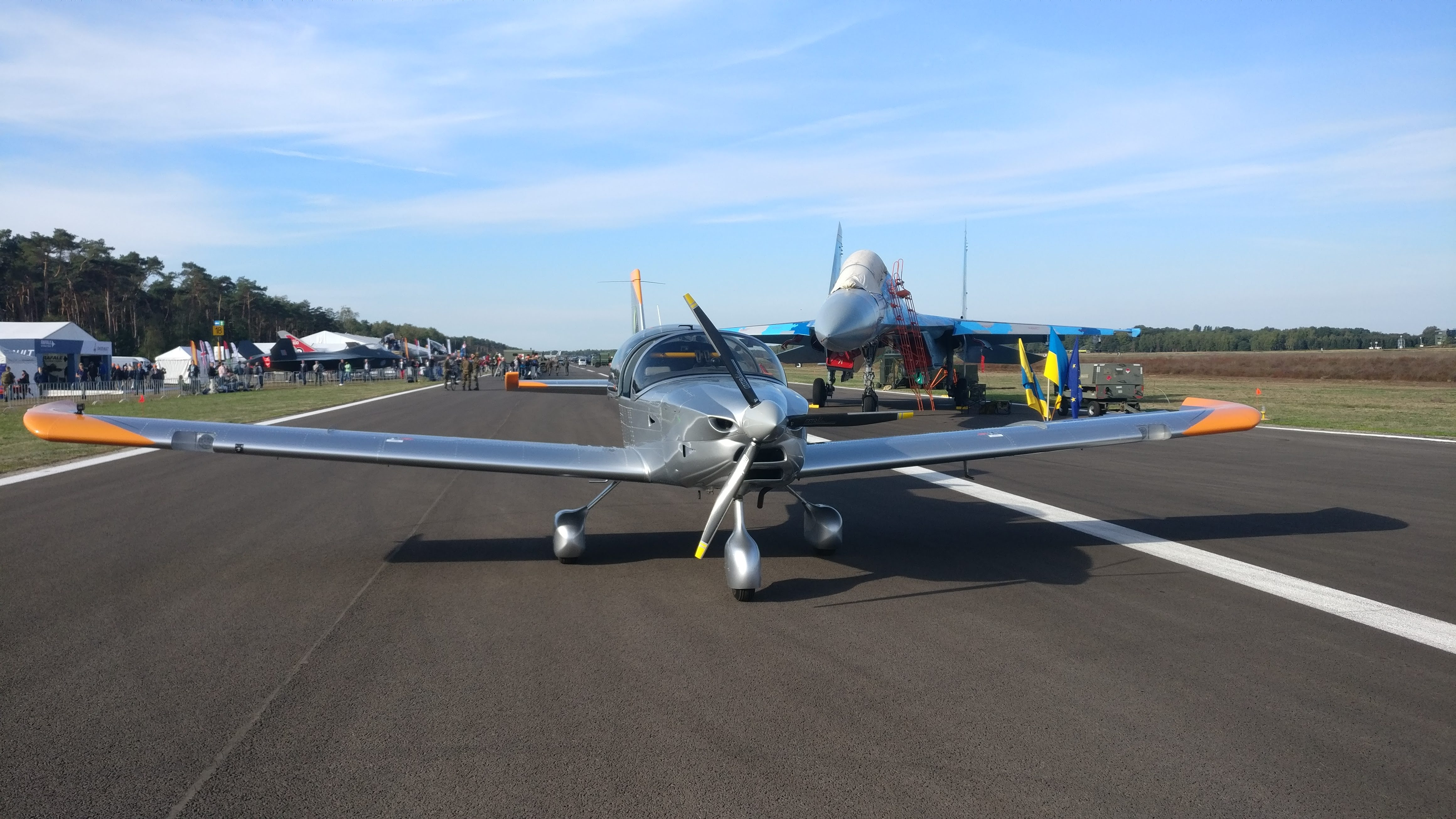
OO-NEW before display at BAFD 2018, Kleine Brogel air base

Data from TCDS

General characteristics

- Crew: 1 pilot
- Capacity: 1 passenger or trainee
- Length: 6.74 m (22 ft 1 in)
- Wingspan: 9.24 m (30 ft 4 in)
- Height: 2.56 m (8 ft 5 in)
- Wing area: 11.85 m^{2} (127.6 sq ft)
- Max takeoff weight: 750 kg (1,653 lb)
- Fuel capacity: 140 L
- Powerplant: 1 × Rotax 914F four-stroke piston engine, 86 kW (115 hp)
- Propellers: 3-bladed DUC Helices FLASH-R, 1.75 m (5 ft 9 in) diameter Clockwise rotation (pilot;s view)

Performance

- Cruise speed: 213 km/h (132 mph, 115 kn)
- Never exceed speed: 250 km/h (155 mph, 135 kn)
- Service ceiling: 4,000 m (13,000 ft)
- Rate of climb: 3.8 m/s (750 ft/min)
