= AeroDelft =

Engineering foundation

- Formation: 2018
- Type: Student engineering team
- Legal status: Foundation
- Headquarters: Delft, Netherlands
- Location: Delft University of Technology
- Website: aerodelft.nl

AeroDelft is a Dutch student-run engineering foundation based at Delft University of Technology. Founded in 2018, the organisation develops hydrogen-electric aircraft through its Project Phoenix programme. The programme has included a one-third-scale uncrewed demonstrator and a full-scale light aircraft based on the Sling 4.

== History ==
AeroDelft publicly presented the Phoenix Prototype in February 2021. The remotely controlled aircraft was designed as a one-third-scale demonstrator for testing battery-electric, gaseous-hydrogen and liquid-hydrogen propulsion technologies. The team separately began developing a full-scale aircraft using a kit-built Sling 4 composite airframe.

The Phoenix Prototype completed its first battery-powered flight on 14 June 2022. The flight lasted 14 minutes and reached an altitude of approximately 350 m (1,150 ft). On 7 July, the full-scale aircraft completed its first public electric taxi run.

In October 2022, AeroDelft began a collaboration with Airbus concerning development of the hydrogen-electric propulsion system and associated research. A collaboration with KLM was announced in April 2023, focusing on Project Phoenix and issues including hydrogen storage, safety, certification and airport infrastructure.

In May 2025, AeroDelft tested an electric aircraft propulsion system powered by liquid hydrogen at the Netherlands Organisation for Applied Scientific Research liquid-hydrogen facility in Ypenburg, The Hague. IO+ reported that AeroDelft was the first student team to operate an electric propulsion system using liquid hydrogen.

In May 2026, AeroDelft carried out taxi tests of the full-scale aircraft using gaseous hydrogen at Rotterdam The Hague Airport. The tests included hydrogen refuelling, propulsion-system checks and operation of the aircraft on airport infrastructure.

== Project Phoenix ==
Project Phoenix is AeroDelft's hydrogen-electric aircraft development programme. It has consisted of a subscale prototype and a full-scale aircraft.

=== Phoenix Prototype ===
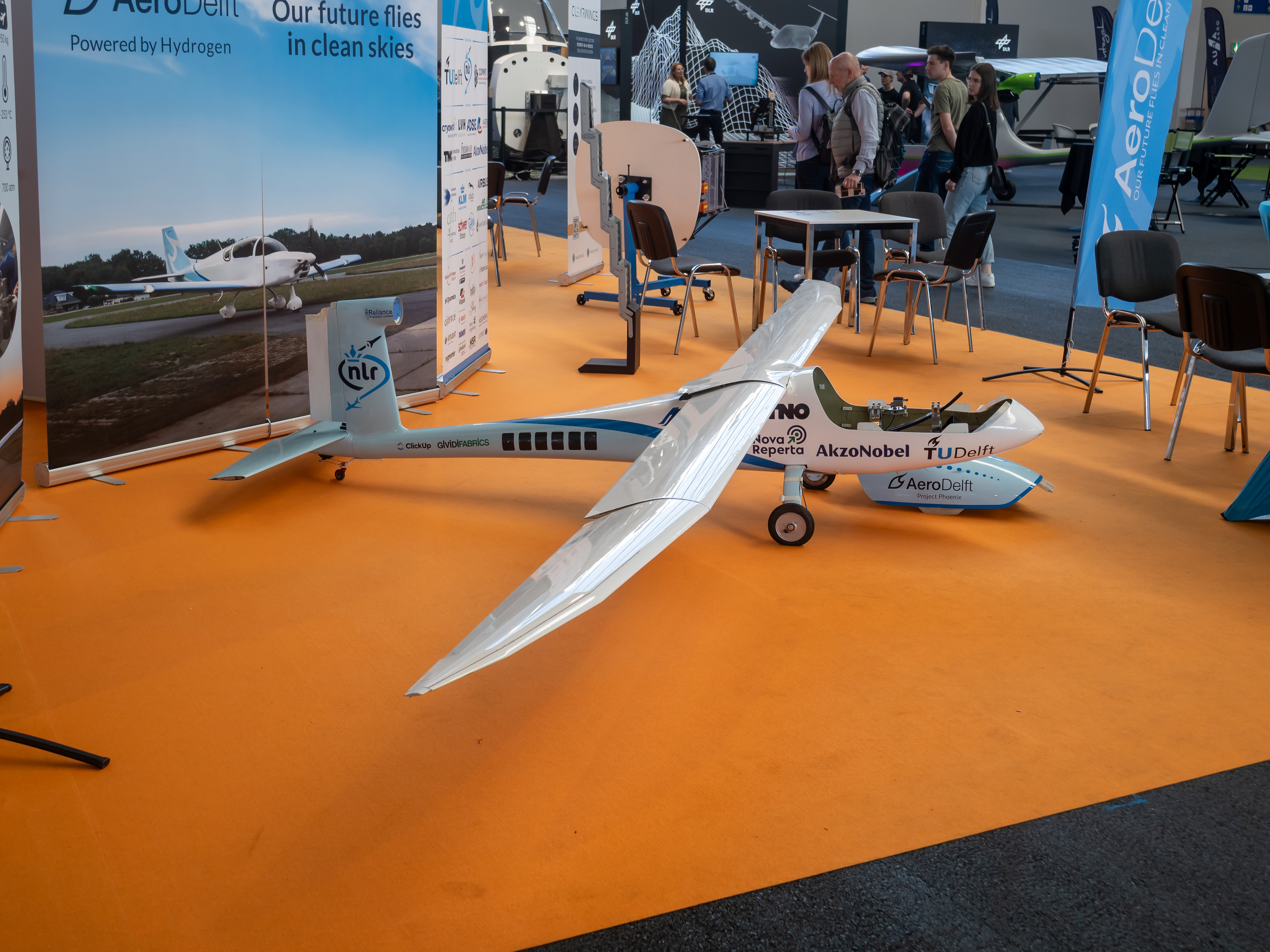
The Phoenix Prototype displayed at AERO Friedrichshafen in 2025.

The Phoenix Prototype is a remotely controlled aircraft based on the configuration of the E-Genius electric motor glider. The one-third-scale demonstrator has a wingspan of approximately 5.7 m (19 ft) and a mass of approximately 50 kg (110 lb). It was constructed to test the aircraft configuration and propulsion system before integration into a crewed aircraft.

The prototype's propulsion architecture uses hydrogen to supply a fuel cell, which generates electricity for an electric propeller motor. Because liquid hydrogen must be stored at cryogenic temperatures, the system also requires insulated storage and equipment to condition the hydrogen before it enters the fuel cell.

=== Full-scale aircraft ===
The full-scale Phoenix is based on a Sling 4 kit aircraft. AeroDelft modified the conventional propulsion installation to accommodate an electric motor, fuel-cell system and hydrogen-storage equipment. The aircraft has been used for electric and gaseous-hydrogen ground testing as part of preparations for flight testing.

== See also ==
- Hydrogen-powered aircraft
- Fuel cell
- Electric aircraft
- Delft University of Technology
