= Sling Aircraft Sling 2 =

South African two-seater light aircraft introduced in 2009

Sling 2
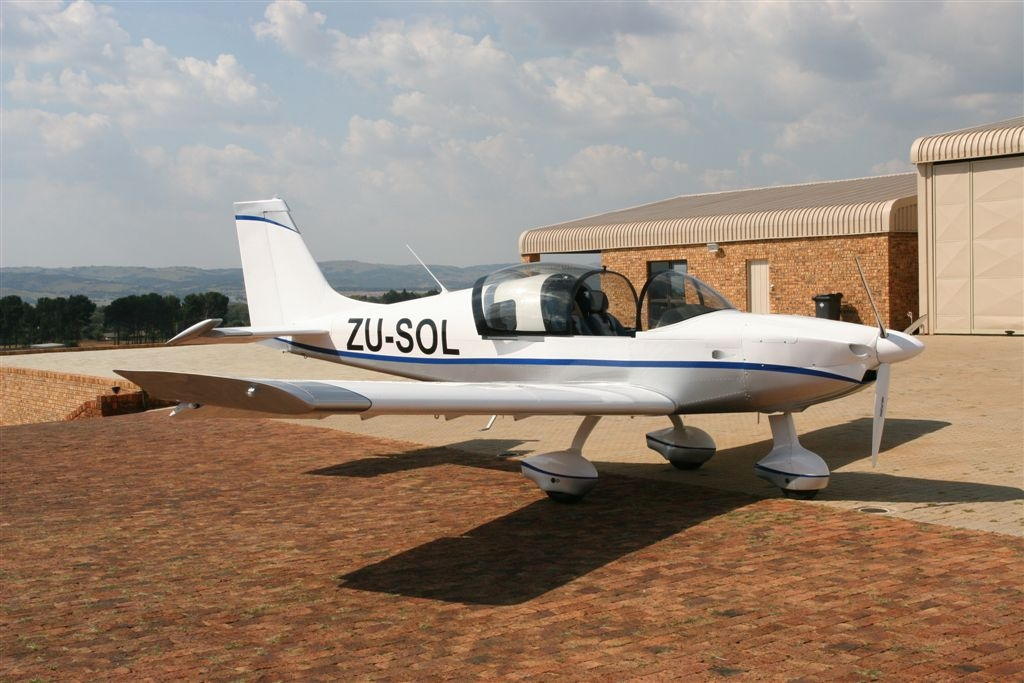
- Sling 2

General information
- Type: Light Sport Aircraft
- Manufacturer: Sling Aircraft
- Designer: Mike Blyth
- Number built: 310 (2019)

History
- Introduction date: 2009
- First flight: 18 November 2008
- Variant: Sling Aircraft Sling 4 Sonaca 200

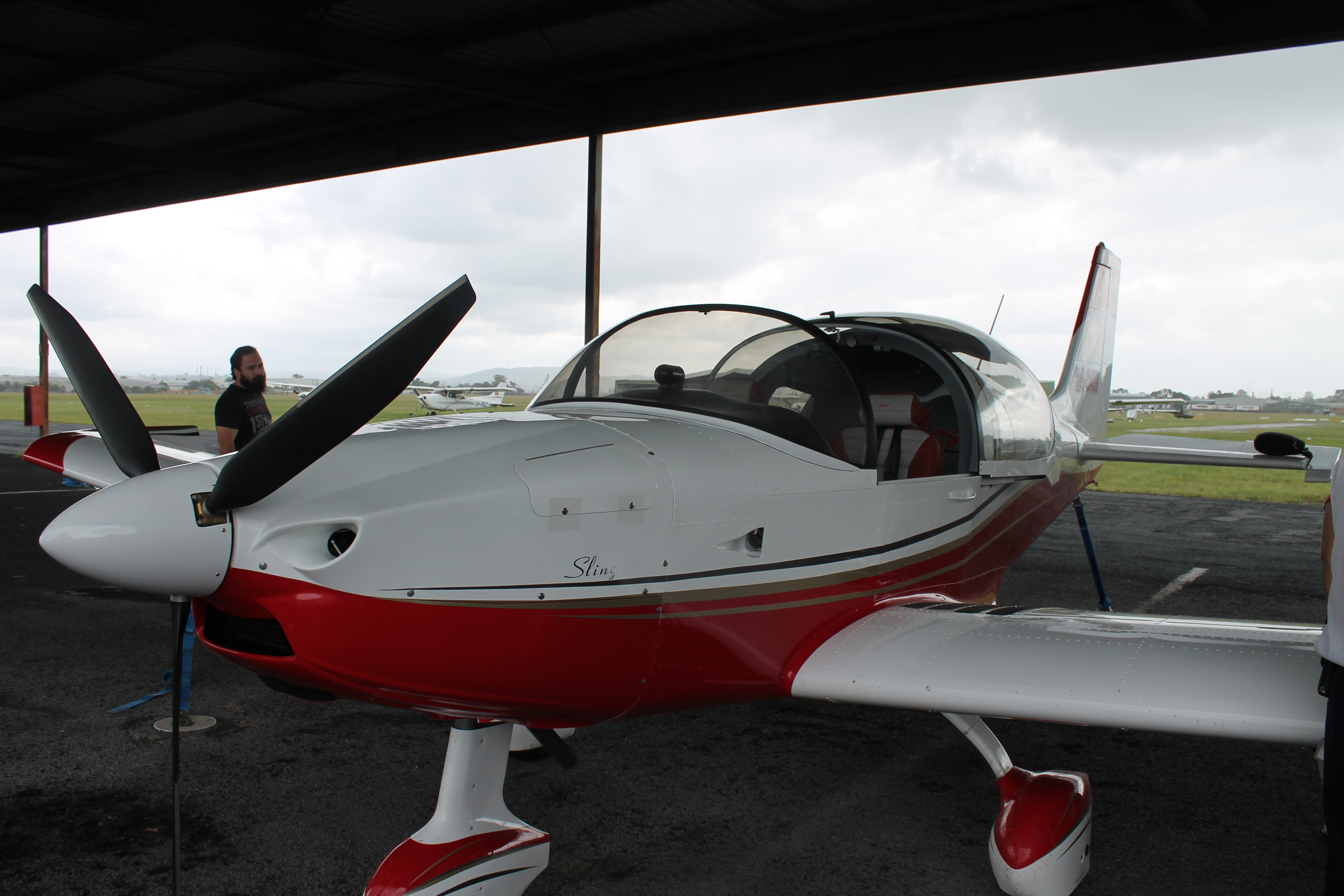
A Sling 2

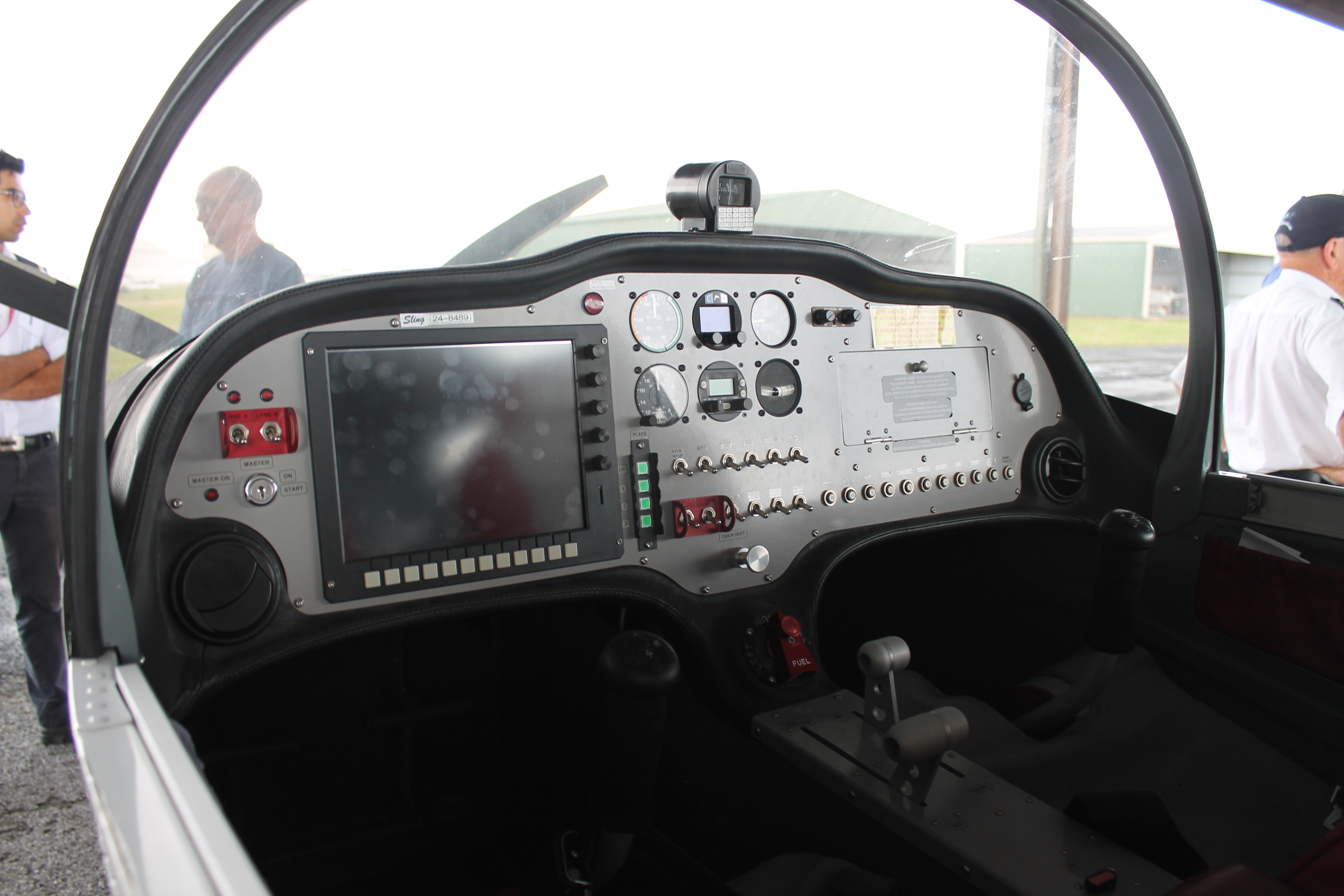
Sling 2 instrument panel

The Sling Aircraft Sling 2, formerly called The Airplane Factory Sling 2, is a South African two-seater light aircraft designed and produced by Sling Aircraft in Johannesburg, South Africa. In 2009 the specially modified second prototype was flown around the world in a westerly circumnavigation which took 40 days. This was the first time any aircraft of this class had achieved a circumnavigation. The design complies with the requirements of four different regulatory aircraft classes.

The design was originally known as the Sling, but was re-designated as the Sling 2 to distinguish it from the later four-seat Sling 4.

The Sling 2 is supplied as a kit and as a ready-to-fly aircraft and can be operated as a light-sport aircraft or homebuilt aircraft.

== Design and development ==
Development of the Sling 2 commenced in 2006. The Sling is a two-seat, low wing, all metal aircraft with tricycle landing gear made from composites. The aircraft is powered by an 80 hp (60 kW) Rotax 912UL,100 hp (75 kW), a Rotax 912ULS, or a 912iS engine, or optionally a turbocharged 115 hp (86 kW) Rotax 914 UL, driving a 3-bladed Warp Drive Inc propeller. The factory later discontinued the 80 hp (60 kW) Rotax 912UL model. The airplane features a sliding canopy, large fuel tanks, and standard equipment includes a "glass cockpit" style display.

Mike Blyth began working on the design of the Sling 2 in 2006; the first prototype first flew on November 18, 2008. A full testing programme followed, with the help of a South African military aerodynamicist, which was completed in 2009. Blyth and partner James Pitman then flew the second prototype around the world to accomplish a challenging circumnavigation.

310 Sling 2s had been completed and flown by the end of 2019.

The UK Light Aircraft Association has limited the airframe structural fatigue life to 500 hours for aircraft in that country. They have also only approved operation for day, visual flight rules.

== Operational history ==
The second prototype Sling 2 was flown on a westerly global circumnavigation in 2009. Blyth and Pitman departed from South Africa flying up through Western Africa, across the Atlantic to Brazil and Guyana, up through the US Virgin Islands and the East Coast of the United States to Oshkosh, Wisconsin for EAA AirVenture Oshkosh 2009. After the air show they flew across the United States to Los Angeles, then on to Hawaii, the Marshall Islands, Micronesia, Indonesia, Malaysia, Sri Lanka, Seychelles, and finally back to South Africa. They completed the whole journey in 40 days. The aircraft used for the circumnavigation was a standard production Sling, but with larger 118.8 U.S. gallons (450 L; 98.9 imp gal) fuel tanks, strengthened landing gear, seats that lie flat for sleeping and removable control sticks. After being modified, the aircraft had an endurance at standard cruise of approximately 24 hours. The aircraft cruised at 89 knots Indicated airspeed (IAS) (98 knots True airspeed (TAS)) with almost full fuel. When more nearly empty, it would cruise at 96 knots IAS (105 knots TAS). With full fuel, fully loaded with crew the Sling weighed approximately 1,984 Lbs (900 kg), or about 600 pounds overweight. At sea level the aircraft would climb slowly, at a rate of 350 feet per minute.

== Variants ==
Sling 2
Base model with 100 hp (75 kW) Rotax 912 engine, certified either as an E-LSA (limited to a max gross weight of 1,320 lbs) or experimental-amateur built aircraft.
Sonaca 200
The Sonaca 200 is an EASA-certified variant of the Sling 2, developed in Belgium fitting the 115 hp (86 kW) Rotax 914F engine, introduced in 2017.

== Specifications (2012 model Sling 2) ==
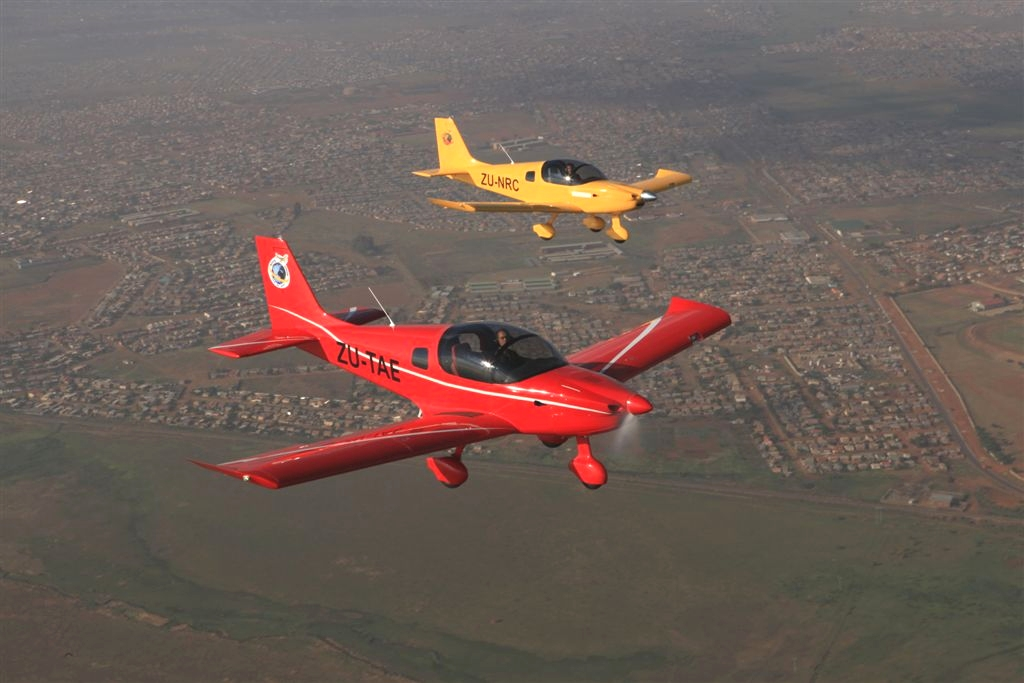
A pair of Sling 2s in formation

Data from The Airplane Factory

General characteristics

- Crew: one
- Capacity: one passenger
- Length: 22.89 ft (6.98 m)
- Wingspan: 30.09 ft (9.17 m)
- Height: 8.202 ft (2.500 m)
- Wing area: 127.5 sq ft (11.85 m^{2})
- Aspect ratio: 7.04:1
- Empty weight: 816 lb (370 kg)
- Gross weight: 1,543 lb (700 kg)
- Fuel capacity: Two tanks with 19.3 U.S. gallons (73 L; 16.1 imp gal) usable
- Powerplant: 1 × Rotax 912iS , 100 hp (75 kW)
- Propellers: 3-bladed Warp Drive Inc composite

Performance

- Cruise speed: 120 kn (140 mph, 220 km/h) true airspeed
- Stall speed: 40 kn (46 mph, 74 km/h) full flaps, indicated airspeed
- Never exceed speed: 135 kn (155 mph, 250 km/h) indicated airspeed
- Service ceiling: 13,000 ft (4,000 m)
- g limits: +4/-2 g
- Wing loading: 12.10 lb/sq ft (59.1 kg/m^{2})

== See also ==
Aircraft of comparable role, configuration, and era

- Rans S-19 Venterra
- Sonaca 200
- Van's Aircraft RV-12
