= Connect Airlines =

Proposed American airline

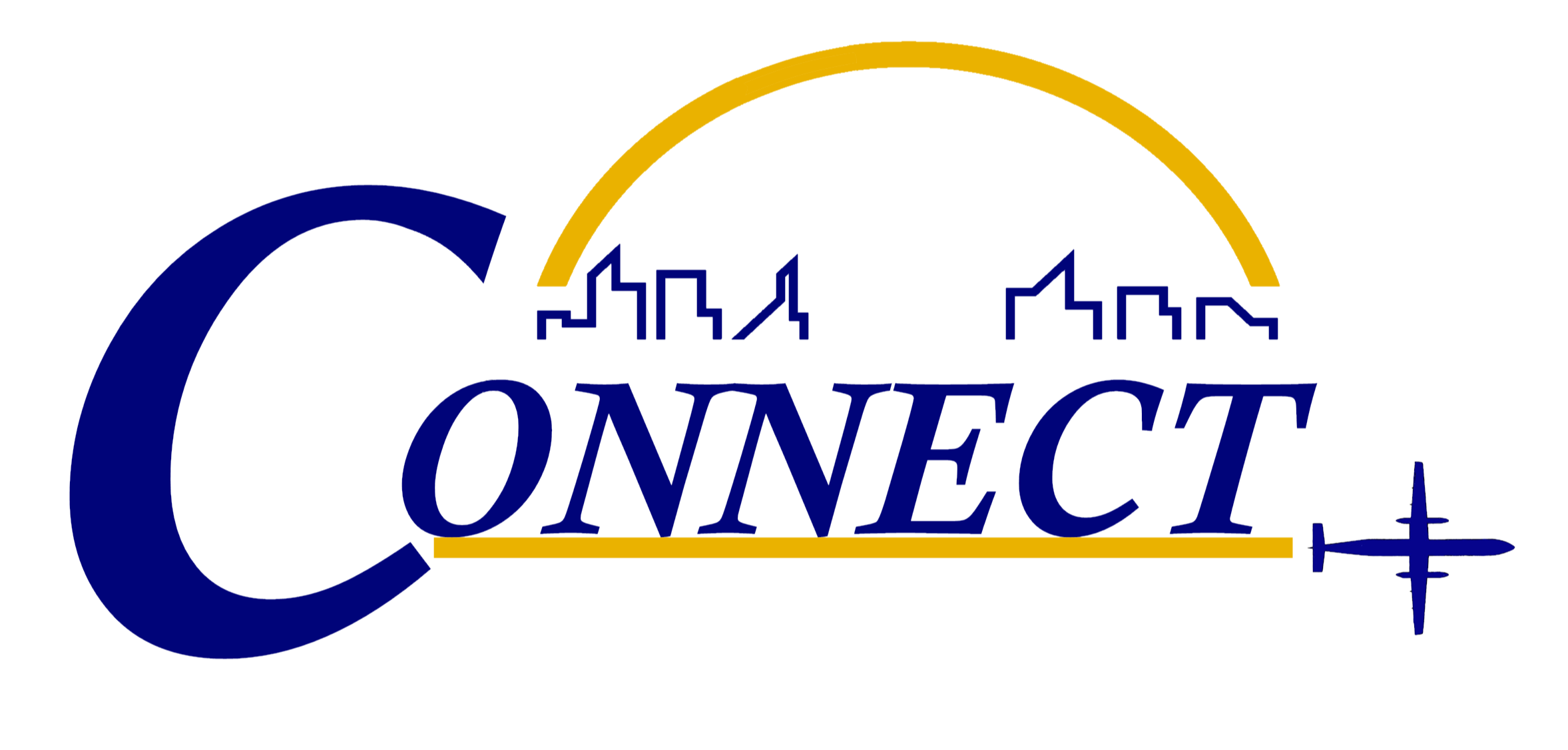
IATA	ICAO	Call sign
MW	WZM	MATILDA
- Founded: April 2021; 5 years ago
- Hubs: Toronto
- Focus cities: Chicago–O'Hare; Philadelphia
- Parent company: Waltzing Matilda Aviation
- Headquarters: Bedford, Massachusetts
- Key people: John Thomas (CEO)
- Employees: 11–50
- Website: connectairlines.com

Connect Airlines is a proposed American airline that intends to operate flights between Billy Bishop Toronto City Airport and Midwest and Northeast US cities. Proposed service will fly between Toronto to/from Chicago and Philadelphia. The airline would be backed by Waltzing Matilda Aviation, a Massachusetts-based charter operator. The company intends to lease De Havilland Canada Dash 8 turboprop aircraft formerly operated by Flybe and will target primarily business travel.

== History ==
In June 2022, Connect Airlines announced an order for 75 converted ATR 72-600 turboprops, with an option for an additional 25, to be converted by Universal Hydrogen to use hydrogen powertrains.

Connect Airlines received a certificate of convenience and necessity for domestic air transportation from the US Department of Transportation (DOT) in July 2022 and a certificate for foreign transport in September 2022. The airline had acquired two Dash-8s as of September 2022, with further aircraft expected to arrive monthly until February 2023. The aircraft have had one row of seats removed and will feature 26 premium seats with increased legroom, as well as 48 economy seats. Service was due to be launched in November 2022; an interline agreement with an as-yet unnamed major carrier had been signed.

As of December 2022, the airline was running proving flights to complete its application requirements for its air operator's certificate, and was looking to hire direct-entry captains to run its initial flights.

In June 2023, it asked the DOT to extend until October 2023 its deadline to begin flying, amid difficulties in meeting FAA requirements. In November 2023, the DOT revoked its certificate of public convenience and necessity, though the airline noted its intent to appeal the revocation and pursue its plans.

In a 2025 appearance at a travel conference, CEO John Thomas elaborated on plans to create more spacious cabins and fly three daily trips between Toronto, Chicago, and Philadelphia.

== Fleet ==
Connect Airlines fleet
Aircraft	In service	Orders	Passengers			Notes
Aircraft	In service	Orders	P	Y	Total	Notes
ATR 72-600	—	75	TBA			Deliveries begin 2025. Order with 25 options.
De Havilland Canada Dash 8-400	—	8	26	48	74	
