= Sling Aircraft Sling TSi =

South African homebuilt aircraft introduced in 2018

Sling TSi
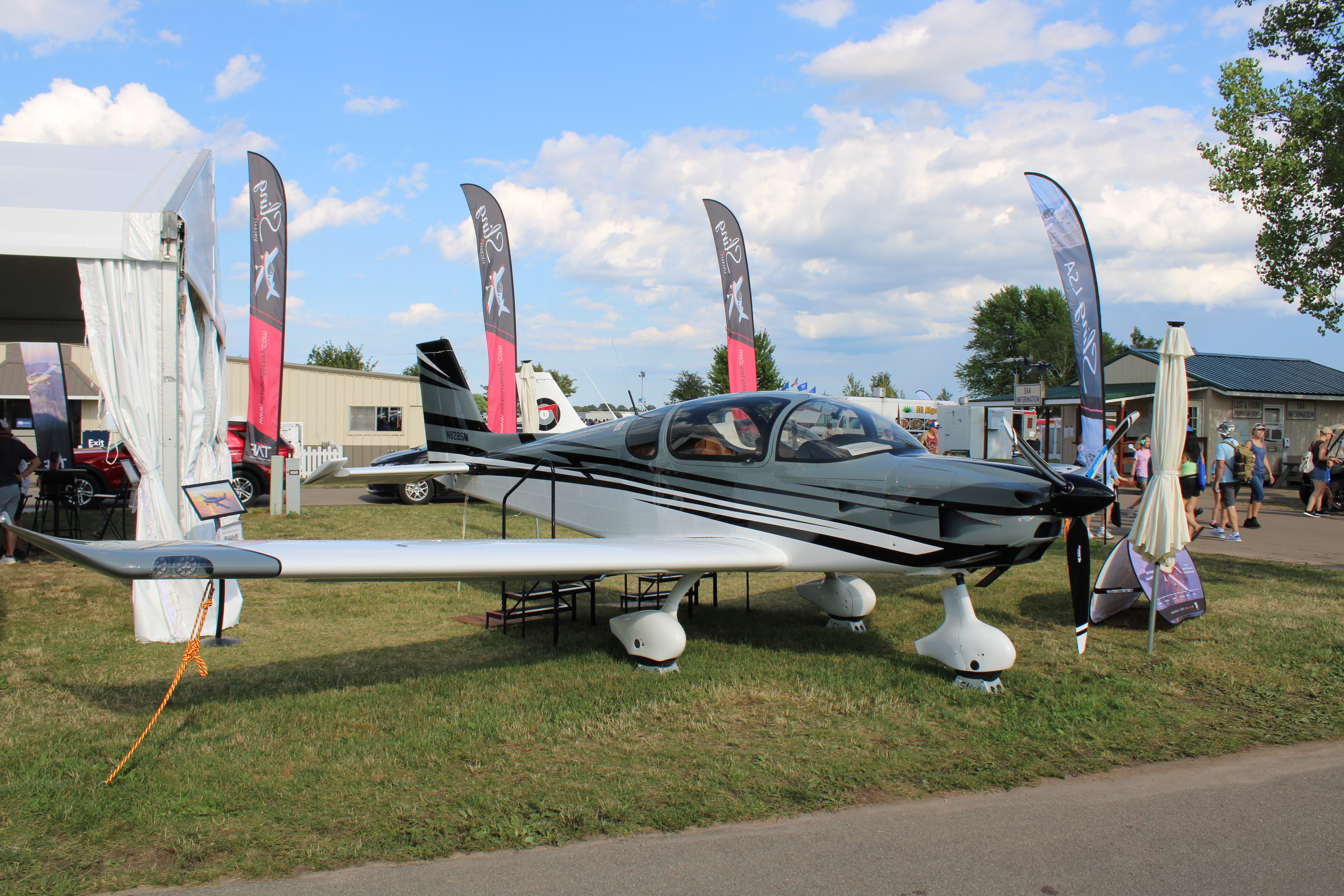

General information
- Type: Homebuilt aircraft
- National origin: South Africa
- Manufacturer: Sling Aircraft

History
- Introduction date: 2018
- First flight: 2018
- Developed from: Sling Aircraft Sling 4
- Variant: Sling Aircraft Sling HW

The Sling TSi is a South African four-seat, single-engine, low-wing homebuilt aircraft sold in kit form by Sling Aircraft of Johannesburg South. It was developed from the Sling 4.

The Sling TSi first flew in 2018, with kits being shipped to builders in fall 2018.

== Design and development ==
The aircraft was developed in 2018. The Sling TSi is an all-metal, low-wing, fixed tricycle gear homebuilt aircraft. The airplane is equipped with the new Rotax 915iS engine and was the inspiration for the designation of TSi. Parts of the wings and fuselage were reinforced and outfitted with flush riveting for increased strength and reduced drag over the Sling 4.

The UK Light Aircraft Association has limited the airframe safe life to 1600 hours due to a stress point in the wing design. Additionally, the LAA has deemed the flight characteristics unsuitable for flight in IMC.

For aircraft fitted with the revised wing spar design, the airframe has an unlimited safe life. All Wing Spars subject to the revised design are denoted by the part number WG-AMS-001-L(or R)-F-1, and Wing Spar Carry Through denoted by CF-AMS-001-C-C-1 in the aircraft build record, earlier examples being blue anodised for ease of recognition. These were included in kits from September 2024 onwards and applies worldwide.

== Operational history ==
The first Sling TSi in the USA was shown at EAA AirVenture Oshkosh in 2018.

In a review for KitPlanes, writer Paul Dye said, "...it lives up to its design goals. We flew with four full sized adults from a field with a density altitude of 9,000' and had to throttle back to keep from exceeding redline when we leveled off at 10,000. Later, operating off of a dry lakebed in the high desert, with temperatures of 100 degrees, we never had to worry about engine cooling - and it handled like a fine touring machine."

A company demonstrator Sling TSi flew non-stop from Torrance, California, to Tampa Executive Airport on its way to Lakeland, Florida for Sun 'n Fun 2019 in 13.5 hours. The aircraft carried an additional 30 U.S. gallons (110 L; 25 imp gal) of fuel over the normal 45 U.S. gallons (170 L; 37 imp gal) long-range tanks and benefited from tailwinds en route.

In July 2019 the company did a ceiling expansion test and flew non-stop from Torrance, California to Wittman Regional Airport to attend EAA AirVenture Oshkosh for 9.75 hours. The aircraft reached a final height of 27,000 feet.

== Variants ==
During EAA AirVenture Oshkosh in 2019 the development of a new high-wing variant, the Sling HW was announced.

== Specifications (2025 model Sling TSi) ==
Data from manufacturer

General characteristics

- Crew: one
- Capacity: three passengers
- Length: 23.54 ft (7.17 m)
- Wingspan: 31.3 ft (9.5 m)
- Height: 8 ft (2.4 m)
- Wing area: 134.2 sq ft (12.47 m^{2})
- Aspect ratio: 7.9
- Empty weight: 1,146 lb (520 kg)
- Gross weight: 2,094 lb (950 kg)
- Fuel capacity: 52.04 US gallons (197.0 L; 43.33 imp gal)
- Powerplant: 1 × Rotax 916 iS horizontally-opposed piston aircraft engine, 141 hp (105 kW)
- Propellers: Duc Hélices Flashblack-3-R 4-blade or MT-Propeller MTV-6 3-blade constant speed propeller

Performance

- Cruise speed: 155 kn (178 mph, 287 km/h) true airspeed at 9,500 ft MSL
- Stall speed: 48 kn (55 mph, 89 km/h) full flaps, indicated airspeed
- Never exceed speed: 155 kn (178 mph, 287 km/h) indicated airspeed
- Range: 1,000 nmi (1,200 mi, 1,900 km) Best range cruise
- Endurance: 8 hours
- Service ceiling: 18,000 ft (5,500 m)
- g limits: +3.8g -1.9g
- Rate of climb: 1,200 ft/min (6.1 m/s)
- Wing loading: 16.91 lb/sq ft (82.6 kg/m^{2})

Avionics

- Garmin 10-inch G3X touch EFIS
- Garmin G5 backup EFIS
- Garmin GTR 200 airband radio
- Garmin GTX 35R remote aircraft transponder
- Garmin GA28 autopilot system with Garmin GAD 27 multifunction system interface
- Garmin GMA 245R Bluetooth Audio Panel.

== See also ==
Similar aircraft

- Alpi Pioneer 400
- Issoire APM 40 Simba
- Vans RV-10
