= Universal Hydrogen =

American hydrogen aviation company

- Type: Private
- Industry: Aerospace
- Founded: 2020 in California
- Founders: Jason Chua, John-Paul Clarke, Paul Eremenko, Jon Gordon
- Defunct: June 2024
- Fate: Liquidated after funding failure
- Headquarters: Hawthorne, California, United States
- Products: Hydrogen fuel cells for aircraft
- Website: hydrogen.aero (dead)

Universal Hydrogen was an American aerospace company. Founded in 2020, it was based in Los Angeles, aiming to create both a hydrogen-powered propulsion system, and a logistics system to allow hydrogen fueling at airports. A maiden flight of a Dash 8 aircraft modified on one side with a hydrogen fuel cell powertrain (including Plug Power fuel cells and a motor from magniX), took place on March 2, 2023; the flight demonstration represented the largest aircraft ever to cruise mainly on hydrogen power.

The company was wound up in June 2024 after failing to secure further funding.

== History ==
=== 2020-2022: Foundings ===
Universal Hydrogen was co-founded by Jason Chua, John-Paul Clarke, Paul Eremenko and Jon Gordon, who had previously worked together at Airbus and Raytheon Technologies, with the ambition of making hydrogen-powered flight a reality within a decade.

Universal Hydrogen was founded by Paul Eremenko, former CTO at Airbus. Paul Eremenko became CEO. It was based in Los Angeles, aiming to create both a hydrogen-powered propulsion system, and a logistics system to allow hydrogen fueling at airports. The startup founders initially invested $3 million in the startup. Eremenko estimated that to reach production, the company would need to raise around $300 million from investors. Universal Hydrogen Co. by August 2020 had developed Kevlar-coated pill-shaped pods filled with hydrogen gas, at about 7 feet in length and 3 feet in diameter. The company pitched these as useful both as gas tanks in planes, and as storage containers for shipping, to eliminate the need for pipelines or underground tanks at airports.

In September 2020, a partnership with Plug Power had been announced, to retrofit a regional airplane with its two propellers powered by hydrogen fuel cells. In August 2021, Universal Hydrogen and its hydrogen fuel cell partner Plug Power began setting up a testing facility at Grant County International Airport in Moses Lake, Washington. Its initial plan to perform flight tests in 2022 was delayed, after integrating the powertrain into the airplane took longer than expected. The company announced in March 2022 that it planned to build a manufacturing facility in Albuquerque. Ultimately, no facility was built.

=== 2023: Test flights ===
In February 2023, the FAA granted the company an experimental airworthiness certificate, giving it the green light to test its hydrogen-powered De Havilland Dash 8,300. In March 2023, for the first time, it flew a Dash 8 test aircraft with its hydrogen fuel electric powertrain. With one engine using the hydrogen fuel cell, and the other using regular jet fuel, the 40-passenger regional airliner flew for 15 minutes out of Moses Lake. It was also working on modifying an ATR 72 in Toulouse, France. Pierre Farjounel was CEO of Universal Hydrogen Europe.

After its successful test flight in Moses Lake, in June 2023, the company announced it was relocating its flight testing activities to the Mojave Desert. Over the next year, Universal Hydrogen performed 13 overall flights. In early 2024, its engineers in Toulouse began ground testing an iron-bird using the powertrain. In March 2024, it was named to Fast Company's list of the most innovative companies of the year. At the end of April 2024, Paul Eremenko stepped down as CEO. In June, Aviation Week reported that it was prepping 10 new flight tests.

=== 2024: Liquidation ===
By the summer of 2024, Universal Hydrogen had spent around $100 million in investor funding since its founding in 2020, and was attempting avoid bankruptcy by merging with Silver Airways. At that point, backers had included Toyota Ventures, Coatue, JetBlue Ventures, Mitsubishi HC Capital, Tencent, and Plug Power.

But in June 2024, company CEO and Chairman Mark Cousin wrote the board with news that financing from new investors had failed. Cousin wrote that the company was made the "first commercially viable hydrogen ecosystem," and hoped "these efforts will live on as part of a future entity." Former CEO and co-founder Eremenko cited investors having fears about the market, in part concerning that hydrogen subsidies would disappear with the Inflation Reduction Act, if Donald Trump were to win the US presidential election. A lack of market availability of green hydrogen was also reported to be an issue.

== Product ==
The company's main product was intended to be a conversion kit to be retrofitted to existing aircraft to allow them to run on hydrogen fuel. The kits were to consist of hydrogen storage tank modules made by the company, combined with an electric motor made by magniX and fuel cells made by Plug Power.
