= Hyfish =

Model hydrogen-powered aeroplane

Hyfish is a model hydrogen powered aeroplane developed by Koni Schafroth. The model has successfully passed test flights under battery power and Smartfish is going forward with development to a 2-man aircraft.

== General history ==
The Hyfish is a product of the German Air & Spacecenter and its international partners. The German Air & Spacecenter, otherwise known as the Deutsches Zentrum fuer Luft- und Raumfahrt, or DLR, is located in Stuttgart, Germany. These partners included, but were not limited to, Horizon Fuel Cell Technologies of Singapore. Development of the Hyfish, an unmanned aerial vehicle that is jet powered by hydrogen fuel cell technology, took eighteen months of hard-work and laboring research. Unmanned aerial vehicles are also called UAVs. UAVs are difficult to power because they have to be small and light in order to be able to maintain flight in the air. To resolve this challenge, Scientists at the DLR Institute for Technical Thermodynamics in Stuttgart integrated Horizon Fuel Cell Technology's fuel cell system into the Hyfish. In order to prepare the Hyfish for flight, the SmartFish team had to test the CFD of the aircraft numerous times. The most influential reasoning behind the creation of the Hyfish was to demonstrate and test the effectiveness of fuel cells in a challenging environment, which in this case, involved flight in the air. However, the construction of the Hyfish also helped researchers educate themselves more in the subject of lightweight construction in addition to the subject of the packaging of fuel cell systems. This unmanned UAV took its first flight in 2007 in Bern, Switzerland.

The Hyfish was put on display at the Hannover fair, otherwise known in Germany as the Hannover Messe, for spectators. This event lasted April 16–20, 2007.[4]

== Fuel cell ==
The Hyfish hydrogen fuel cell system had some unique attributes. It was ultra light and compact, which helped to keep the UAV's weight to 13.2 pounds. This fuel cell created no emissions, another great attribute, and consisted of polymer electrolyte. Because of this, it was able to create one kilowatt of electrical power output. All in all, the fuel cell weighed a measly 6.6 pounds, which included its pressurized hydrogen tank. The fuel cell stack gave power to an impeller jet which enabled flight for about six minutes, despite the less than ideal weather conditions for such an experiment. This kind of technology is what is used in jet skis. The Hyfish excited scientists and made history because it was the first fast plane with jet wings to fly with only a hydrogen fuel cell and its only power source. It performed vertical climbs into the air, loops, circles, and various other aerial acrobatics and tricks while flying at extremely fast speeds reaching 124 miles per hour. George Gu, president and CEO of Horizon Fuel Cell Technologies, verbally displayed his high hopes for the future of UAVs: "We are confident that record-breaking 15 to 30 hour flight times are now within reach for small UAVs, which would offer new and distruptive possibilities in the aviation industry." The Hyfish development team included some notable and accomplished Scientists and researchers. SmartFish GmbH of Bern, Switzerland, developed the flight model. The gas-cell stack was designed and created by Horizon Fuel Technologies in Singapore. Drukon, located in Spitzkunnersdorf, Germany, developed and oversaw the pressure-reducing valve. And finally, Ainet in Germany developed the building of forms.

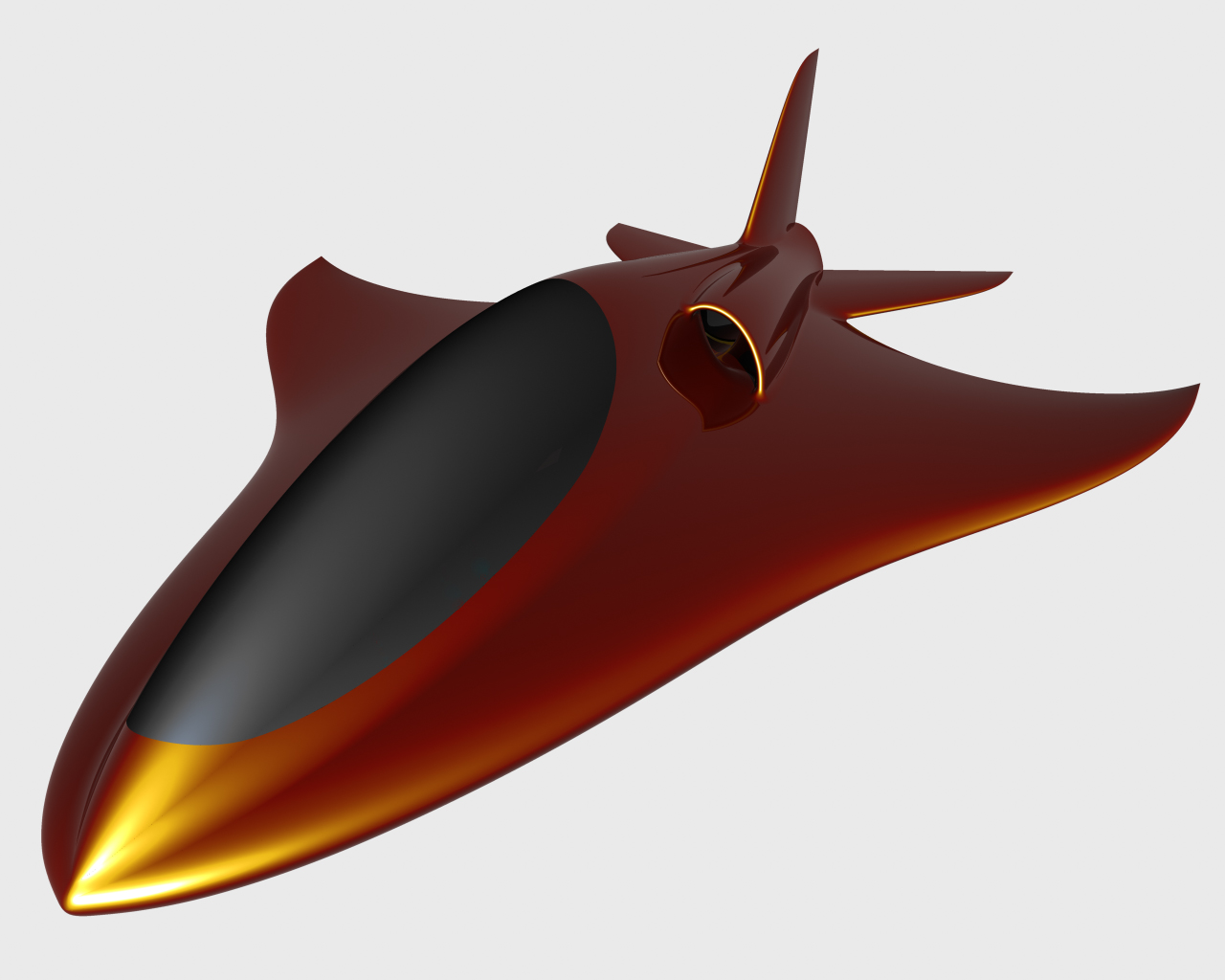
Computer generated model of the Hyfish

== Other features ==
Other features of the Hyfish were just as revolutionary as the hydrogen fuel cell, including the fuselage which was four feet long. The wings of this UAV were a mere three feet wide, an extremely small measurement. The composite structure of the Hyfish was completed and overseen by the company LTB Borowski. The vast majority of the parts that constructed the Hyfish were made from glass fibers. In other statistics, the thrust-to-weight ratio of the Hyfish was measured to be 1:3. The Hyfish was readily equipped to be able to fly at speeds ranging from 200 miles per hour to 300 kilometers per hour and at altitudes as high as 7,000 meters. The name is no coincidence; the Hyfish was actually inspired by a fish.

== See also ==
- German Aerospace Center
- Hydrogen planes
