= Plug Power =

American technology company

Plug Power Inc.
- Type: Public
- Traded as: Nasdaq: PLUG; Russell 2000 component
- ISIN: US72919P2020
- Industry: Alternative energy
- Founded: 1997; 29 years ago
- Headquarters: Latham, New York, US
- Key people: Jose Luis Crespo (CEO); Andrew Marsh (chairman)
- Products: Fuel cell systems
- Revenue: ▼US$628 million (2024)
- Operating income: ▼US$-1,078 million (2024)
- Net income: ▼US$-2,104 million (2024)
- Total assets: ▲US$5.764 billion (2022)
- Number of employees: 3,353 (2022)
- Subsidiaries: Hyvia (50%)
- Website: www.plugpower.com

Plug Power Inc. is an American company engaged in the development of hydrogen fuel cell and electrolyzer systems that replace conventional batteries in equipment and vehicles powered by electricity. The company is headquartered in Slingerlands, New York, and has facilities in Spokane, Washington, and Rochester, New York.

Plug Power's GenDrive system integrates fuel cells manufactured by both Plug Power and Ballard Power Systems and incorporates a hydrogen storage system that allows the system to "recharge" in a matter of minutes as opposed to several hours for lead-acid batteries. It allows hydrogen-powered forklifts to run at a constant steady power. GenDrive units occupy the same space designed for conventional batteries.

== History ==
Plug Power was founded in 1997 as a joint venture between DTE Energy and Mechanical Technology Inc. The company went public in October 1999.

The company was subject to a shareholder class action complaint for securities fraud following the IPO for allegedly misleading statements about their fuel cell technology capabilities and on its material sales and distribution relationship with General Electric. By order dated October 30, 2000, the Eastern District of New York court consolidated the complaints into one action, entitled Plug Power Inc. Securities Litigation, CV-00-5553 (ERK) (RML). On December 29, 2004, the company settled the matter with the sum of $5 million paid by Plug Power company directors to plaintiffs.

In February 2017, the company announced the first shipments of its ProGen fuel cell engines designed for electric delivery vehicles and the adoption of its GenDrive system by the USPS forklift fleet in Capitol Heights, Maryland.

In February 2020, the company introduced 125 kW Progen fuel cell engines for class 6, 7 & 8 trucks and heavy duty off-road equipment. In January 2021, SK Group, a major South Korean company, announced an investment of $1.5 billion in Plug Power for around 10% share. They will form a joint venture company in South Korea to supply hydrogen fuel cell products to Asian markets.

In January 2021, the company signed a memorandum of understanding with French automobile manufacturer Renault. The deal would launch a joint venture in France by the end of June 2021.

On March 2, 2021, Plug Power filed a Notification of Late Filing with the Securities and Exchange Commission stating that it could not timely file its annual report for the period ended December 31, 2020. On March 16, 2021, the company announced that they would have to restate financial statements for fiscal years 2018 and 2019 as well as some recent quarterly filings. It is subject to an ongoing shareholder class action lawsuit for securities fraud over alleged misrepresentations and/or failures to disclose its inability to timely file its 2020 annual report and material weaknesses in its internal controls over financial reporting.

Due to the rarity of hydrogen infrastructure, Plug Power delivers several mobile refueler solution for transit agencies and trucking fleet customers.

In January 2024 the company completed largest electrolytic liquid hydrogen production plant operating in the United States in Woodbine, Georgia. The plant is designed to produce 15 tons per day (TPD) of liquid electrolytic hydrogen. Through eight 5-megawatt (MW) PEM electrolyzers, water is separated into hydrogen and oxygen. The hydrogen gas is then condensed into liquid form at -423F to be delivered to customers’ hydrogen fueling stations through Plug’s logistics network using cryogenic trailers.

In October 2025, Plug Power announced it delivered the first of ten 10MW GenEco electrolyzer to Galp's Sines Refinery. The full 100MW deployment is expected to replace 20% of Galp's gray hydrogen and cut 110,000 tons of carbon dioxide annually.
