= Sling Aircraft =

South African aircraft manufacturer

Sling Aircraft (Pty) Ltd
- Company type: Privately held company
- Industry: Aerospace
- Headquarters: Eikenhof, South Africa
- Products: Kit aircraft Sling Aircraft Sling 2 Sling Aircraft Sling 4 Sling Aircraft Sling TSi; Sling Aircraft Sling HW
- Owner: Mike Blyth, James Pitman, Andrew Pitman
- Number of employees: 485
- Website: slingaircraft.com

Former company logo

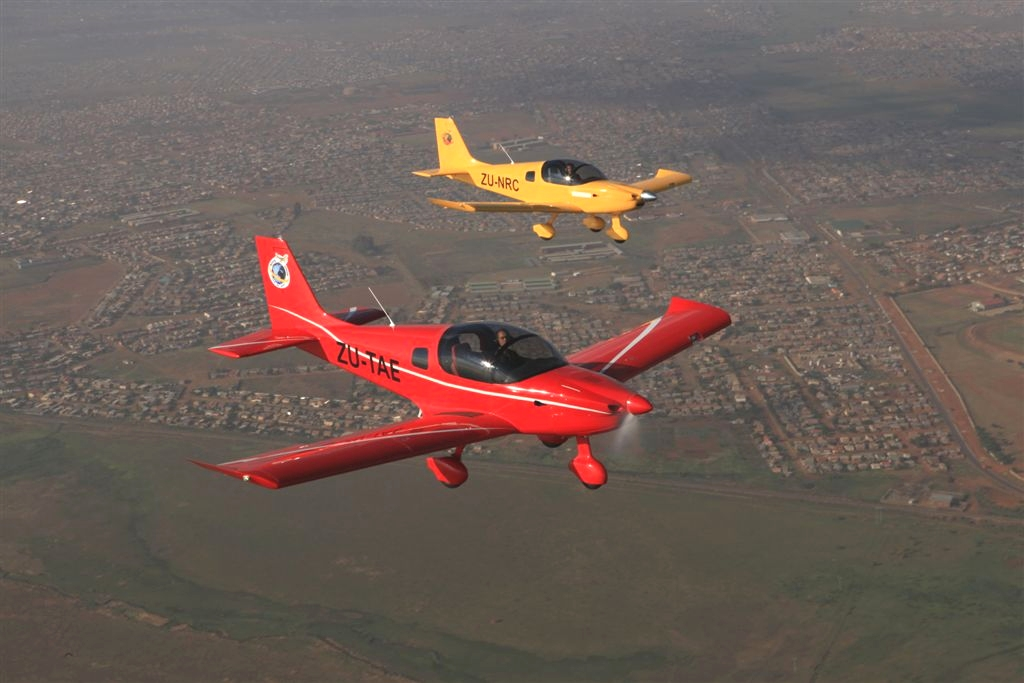
Sling Aircraft Sling 2s in formation

Sling Aircraft (Pty) Ltd, formerly called The Airplane Factory (Pty) Ltd., is a South African aircraft manufacturer based at Tedderfield Airpark, Eikenhof, Johannesburg South. The company specializes in the design and manufacture of light aircraft in the form of kits for amateur construction and ready-to-fly aircraft for the Fédération Aéronautique Internationale microlight and the American light-sport aircraft categories.

== Description ==
The enterprise is a proprietary company under South African law.

The company has three shareholders: Mike Blyth, Director; James Pitman, Co-Ceo; Andrew Pitman, Co-CEO.

Sling Aircraft utilizes numerical control manufacturing and computer-aided design in its aircraft design and production processes.

The company produces the two-seat Sling 2, which was first flown in 2008 and the four-seat Sling 4, introduced in 2011, which although is still fully supported by the factory, is now in limited production, and Sling TSi which was first released in 2018, and has since replaced the Sling 4. Their latest model is the high-wing called the Sling HW that made its first flight in 2020.

In July 2013, a Sling 4 was flown by Mike Blyth and his son from South Africa to AirVenture in Oshkosh, Wisconsin, United States. The flight included a 14-hour over-water leg using the modified Sling 4's 20 hours of fuel endurance.

In July 2022, three Sling High Wings (one tail dragger, two with tricycle gear) were flown from South Africa to AirVenture in Oshkosh, Wisconsin, United States.

== Aircraft ==
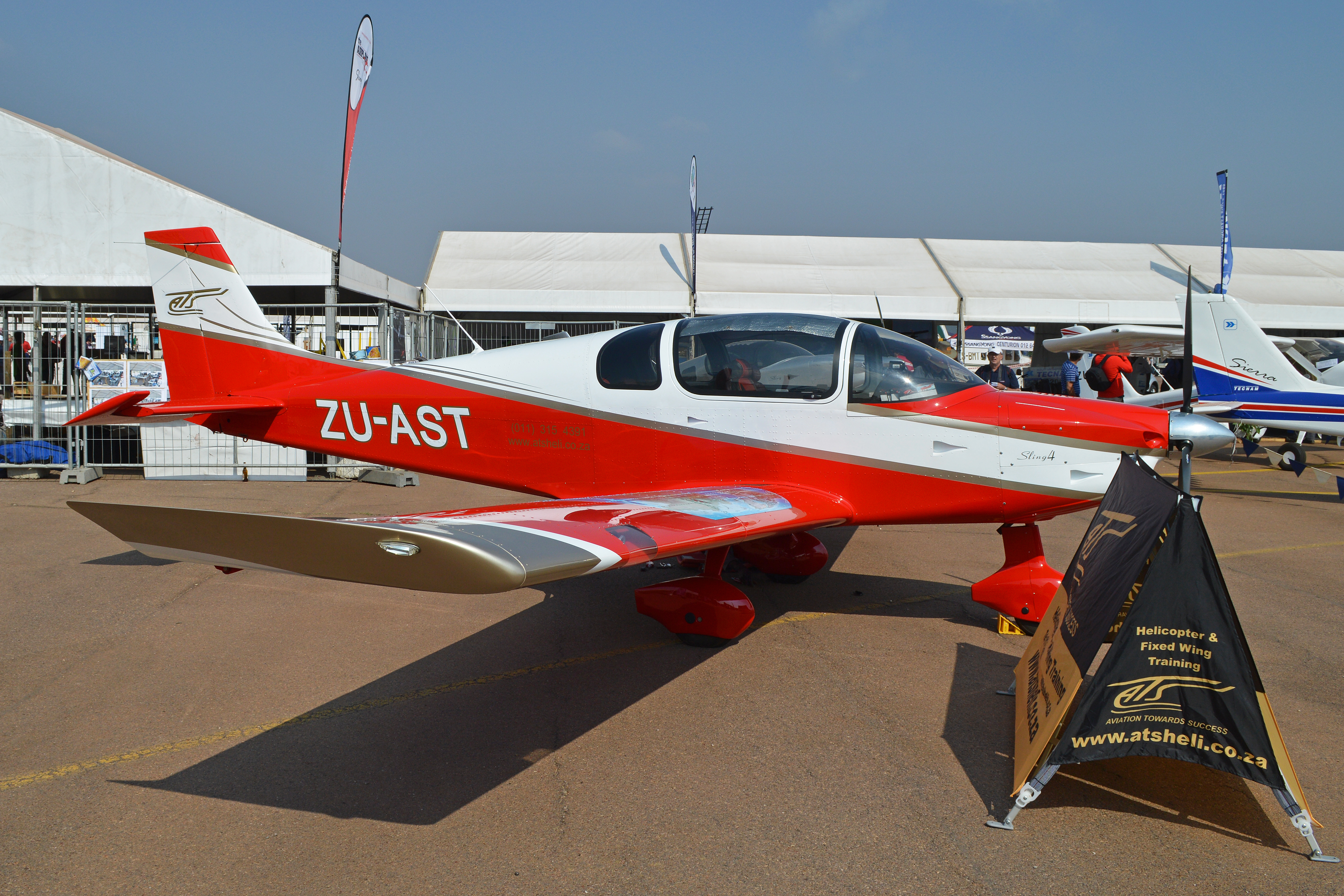
Sling 4

Model name	First flight	Number built	Type
Sling Aircraft Sling 2	2008	328 (2020).	Two-seat, low wing microlight aircraft
Sling Aircraft Sling 4	2011	281 (2020)	Four-seat, low wing aircraft
Sling Aircraft Sling TSi	2018	281 (2020, combined with Sling 4 sales)	Four-seat, low wing aircraft
Sling Aircraft Sling HW	2020	30 (2025)	Four-seat, high wing aircraft
