= Frasson =

Frasson is a surname. Notable people with this surname include:

- Joe Frasson (1935–2016), American NASCAR Winston Cup Series driver
- Vinicius Frasson (born 1984), Italian Brazilian footballer
