= Warp Drive Inc =

American manufacturing company

- Industry: Aerospace
- Headquarters: Ventura, Iowa, United States
- Products: Aircraft propellers

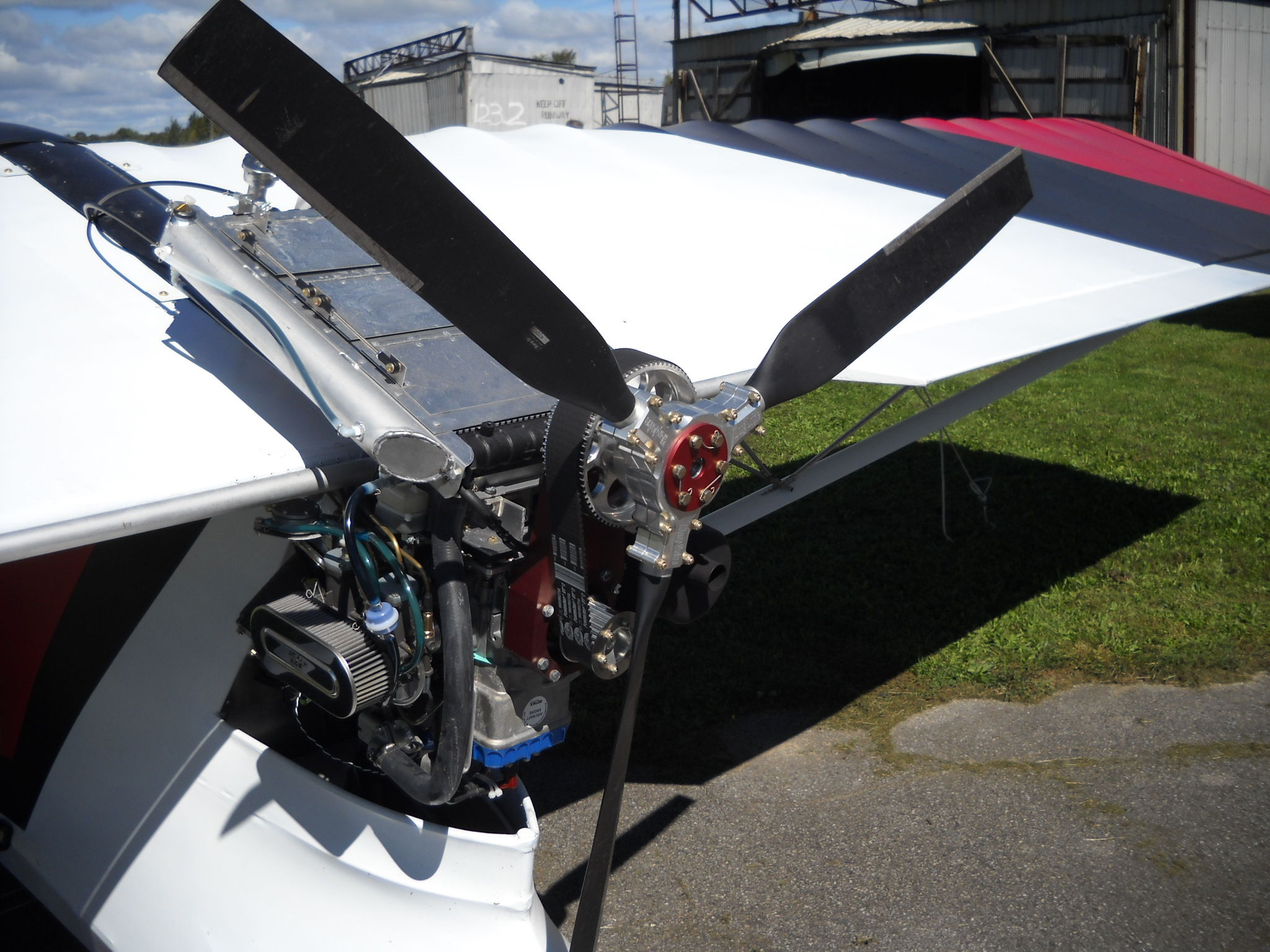
A Warp Drive propeller mounted to a Rotax 582 two stroke aircraft engine on a Quad City Challenger II.

Warp Drive Inc. is an American manufacturer of composite propellers for ultralight aircraft, ultralight trikes, light-sport aircraft, amateur-built aircraft, gyrocopters, airboats, and other non-certified applications. The company is based in Ventura, Iowa.

The company makes its propellers from solid carbon-fiber-reinforced polymer.

== History ==
Warp Drive Inc. was founded in Ventura, Iowa in 1988 by Dale Kjellsen.

== See also ==
- List of aircraft propeller manufacturers
