= Sling Aircraft Sling HW =

South African four-seat, high-wing homebuilt aircraft

Sling HW
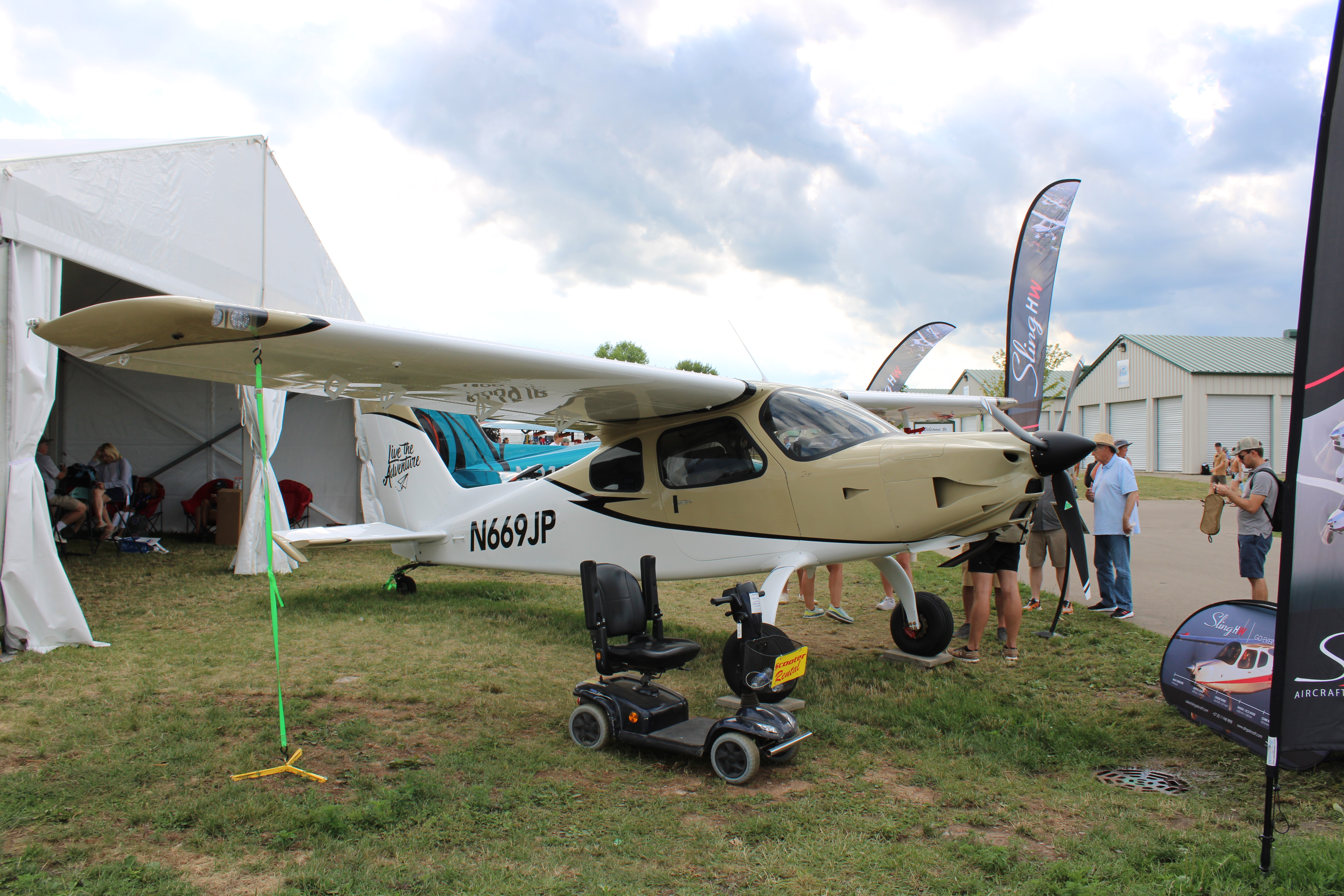

General information
- Type: Homebuilt aircraft
- National origin: South Africa
- Manufacturer: Sling Aircraft

History
- First flight: December 2020
- Developed from: Sling Aircraft Sling TSi

The Sling HW is a South African four-seat, single-engine, high-wing homebuilt aircraft sold in kit form by Sling Aircraft of Johannesburg South.

It was developed from the Sling Aircraft Sling TSi and is the first high-wing model developed by Sling Aircraft.

The company is inconsistent in the aircraft's nomenclature and the official website variously refers to it as the Sling 4 HW, Sling HW and the Sling 4 High Wing.

== Design and development ==
The development of the Sling HW was announced at EAA AirVenture Oshkosh in 2019.

The aircraft was developed between 2019 and 2020. The Sling HW is a cantilever high-wing, fixed tricycle gear or conventional landing gear homebuilt aircraft. Construction is predominantly pop riveted aluminium and fibreglass, with the center of the fuselage made from carbon fiber. The main landing gear legs are made from 100 layers of fibreglass. The airplane is equipped with a turbocharged Rotax 915 iS powerplant of 141 hp (105 kW).

Sling Aircraft founder and chief designer Mike Blythe explained that the model started with a request from an older, less physically agile and heavier-weight customer who told Blythe, "if you build a high-wing airplane that will be easier to get in and out of, I’ll buy it!" The development of a high-wing model also followed customer demand to provide better ground visibility and back country capability, compared to low-wing aircraft. The aircraft was designed for a large cabin and ease-of-entry. The Sling High Wing has much parts commonality with the Sling TSi, including the cantilever wing design, with the major difference in the center section to accommodate the high-wing design.

Cabin width is 46 in (117 cm).

The first flight of the prototype was in December 2020.

== Operational history ==
In a 2022 review, AVweb writer Paul Dye wrote, "Speed performance was right on the predictions from the factory. The Rotax 915 iS motor goes into ECO (economy) mode when you pull the power back to 80%, and at this power setting, we consistently saw 135–136 KTAS on the EFIS. This was about 10 knots slower than the low-wing TSi with the same engine at the same power setting, but it’s about as expected due to a larger frontal area and the heavier weight of the prototype. It will be interesting to see if the lighter production models will go faster, but at any rate, if you’re thinking of comparisons, I doubt you’ll find a standard-engine Cessna 172 that will cruise anywhere near that, and certainly not on 7.7 gph."

Three Sling HWs were flown from the factory in Johannesburg, South Africa, to Oshkosh, Wisconsin for AirVenture 2022. One was the factory prototype to be displayed at the airshow, while the others were ferry flight deliveries for American customers. The route flown was north along African west coast and across to the Cape Verde Islands, then across the Atlantic Ocean to Barbados, the Bahamas, Florida and over land to Oshkosh.

== Specifications (2021 model Sling HW) ==
Data from manufacturer

General characteristics

- Crew: one
- Capacity: four passengers
- Length: 23.6 ft (7.2 m)
- Wingspan: 31.3 ft (9.5 m)
- Height: 8.6 ft (2.6 m)
- Empty weight: 1,279 lb (580 kg)
- Gross weight: 2,315 lb (1,050 kg)
- Fuel capacity: 52 US gallons (200 L; 43 imp gal)
- Powerplant: 1 × Rotax 915 iS horizontally-opposed piston aircraft engine, 141 hp (105 kW)
- Propellers: 3-bladed Airmaster Propellers electric constant speed propeller

Performance

- Cruise speed: 145 kn (167 mph, 269 km/h) true airspeed
- Stall speed: 49 kn (56 mph, 91 km/h) full flaps, indicated airspeed
- Never exceed speed: 155 kn (178 mph, 287 km/h) indicated airspeed
- Range: 880 nmi (1,010 mi, 1,630 km) 75% power with 45 minute reserve
- Endurance: 8 hours
- Service ceiling: 18,000 ft (5,500 m)

== See also ==
Similar aircraft

- Glasair Sportsman 2+2
- Jabiru J430
- Tecnam P2008
- Tecnam P2010
- Sling Aircraft Sling TSi
