= Théodore-Henri Fresson =

Theodore-Henri Fresson (June 18, 1865 – July 15, 1951) was an agronomist. He is the inventor of a photographic paper, Charbon-Satin, a type of carbon print. It uses pigment rather than dye, and is generally stable. The process has been kept secret but is still practised by members of his family.
