= Project Fresson =

Proposed electric propulsion aircraft

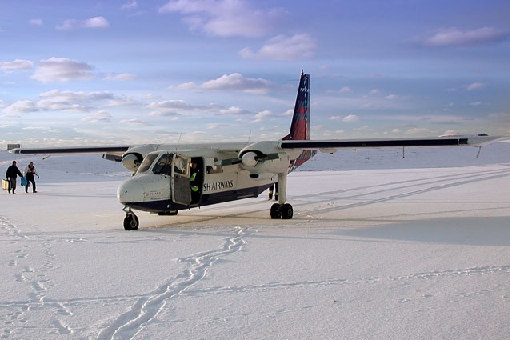
- The pictured BN Islander will be electrified

General information
- Type: Electric aircraft
- National origin: United Kingdom
- Manufacturer: Cranfield Aerospace Solutions
- Status: Under development

History
- Introduction date: planned 2022–23
- First flight: planned April 2022
- Developed from: Britten-Norman BN-2 Islander

Project Fresson is the development by Cranfield Aerospace of an electric propulsion system for the over 700 BN-2 Islanders currently operated, supported by Britten-Norman.

== Development ==
It is proposed for the Scottish airline Loganair, which operate the few minutes long flights to the Orkney Islands' six airfields, including the world's shortest, the Westray to Papa Westray flight scheduled for 1.5 min. The Orkney Islands already have wind turbines and in Kirkwall harbour the inter-island ferries can be powered by locally produced hydrogen via fuel cells. Less noisy, the kit could be modified for similar-size aircraft and could be used for parachuting depending on the charging speed.

Approved by the EASA, Cranfield built the X-48 blended wing body scale-model for NASA, and works with Airbus and Rolls-Royce to develop the hybrid E-Fan X converted BAe 146 demonstrator. Cranfield wants to develop a STC with off-the-shelf parts: current batteries would give it a 30 min endurance, sufficient for many island flights but not providing any safety margin, and more with a range extender. By avoiding Avgas and with the lower maintenance of the simpler system, operators could attain a return on investment in 2–3 years with additional investment for charging infrastructure. To back the development, Cranfield applied for UK government grants through the Aerospace Technology Institute and UK Research and Innovation, and approached private enterprises. In 2018 it was reported that if it were funded with £10 million, a prototype could have flown in 2021, and the kit could have been available in 2022–23.

Led by Cranfield Aerospace Solutions (CAeS), Project Fresson (named after Scottish pioneer aviator Ted Fresson) started on 1 October 2019, to fly a demonstrator within 30 months before an EASA STC within another 6–12 months. Partners include Britten-Norman, Rolls-Royce plc for the power management system, Denis Ferranti for the electric motors, Delta Motorsport for the battery pack, and Warwick Manufacturing Group for battery testing. It targets a 60 min endurance plus 30 min reserves and with energy five times cheaper than Avgas and reduced maintenance, the conversion cost could be recovered in three years. Half of the £18 million ($22 million) funding come from the partners and the other half from the UK government. Of 800 Islanders in service, around 600 are used for short flights. After that, CAeS wants to convert an existing 19-seat airliner to hybrid-electric propulsion, then use this EASA-certified power train in a new-design 19-seat.

Rolls-Royce may evolve the design into a series hybrid with a M250 turboshaft instead of the twin piston engines, before powering 19-seat commuter airliner. By November 2019, first flight was scheduled for April 2022.

=== Hydrogen power ===
In March 2021, the power source was switched from hybrid-electric to hydrogen fuel cells, with wing-mounted fuel tanks, as batteries or range extenders were not viable.

In March 2021 it was also reported that the first flight was planned for 2022, and entry into service for late 2023 or early 2024.

In January 2022 it was reported that first flight would be in early 2023.

In April 2023, the first flight had not yet taken place and the project announced Evolito Ltd as the motor and inverter supplier.

Endurance would fall to one hour with a 45-minute reserve, and range would fall to 100–135 nmi (190–250 km) down from 639–728 nmi (1,183–1,348 km) with current engines. Hydrogen fuel could save £150,000–£300,000 annually over fossil fuel, maintenance costs should fall by 50% for the propulsion system, and 15% for the whole aircraft. Rolls-Royce plc left the consortium, while engineering company Ricardo plc will integrate the two 250 kW (340 hp) fuel cells and Innovatus Technologies the composite hydrogen fuel tanks.

== See also ==
- Ampaire Electric EEL
- Eviation Alice
- VoltAero Cassio
- Wright Electric
- Zunum Aero
- Evolito Ltd
