= Sling Aircraft Sling 4 =

South African kit aircraft introduced in 2011

Sling 4
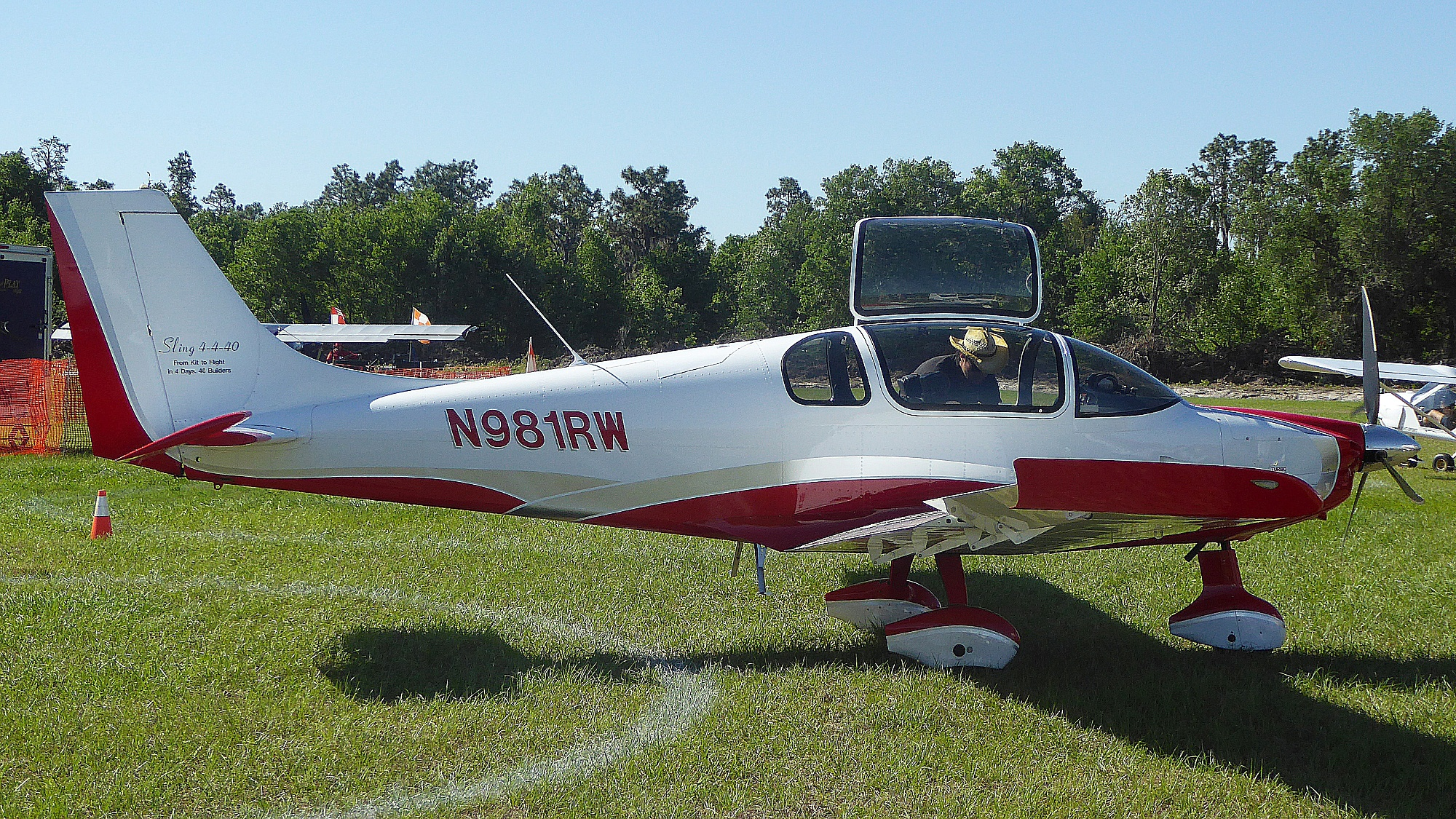

General information
- Type: Homebuilt aircraft
- National origin: South Africa
- Manufacturer: Sling Aircraft

History
- Introduction date: 2011
- Developed from: Sling Aircraft Sling 2
- Variant: Sling Aircraft Sling TSi

The Sling Aircraft Sling 4 is a South African kit aircraft. It is a development of the Sling 2 to accommodate four people, produced by Sling Aircraft of Johannesburg, South Africa.

== Design and development ==
The Sling 4 is an all-metal, low-wing, fixed tricycle gear kit aircraft, developed in 2011. The canopy was modified to include gull-wing doors. The aircraft has flaps with 40 degrees of travel.

It has been estimated that building a Sling 4 requires 900-1,200 man-hours of work. The aircraft can be supplied as a kit, or built by the factory.

The US Aircraft Owners and Pilots Association (AOPA) tested the Sling 4 in 2016, citing a completed base price of US$123,417, rising to $192,000 with most options.

The UK Light Aircraft Association has limited the airframe structural fatigue life to 500 hours for aircraft in that country. They have also only approved operation for day, visual flight rules.

== Operational history ==
In July 2013, a Sling 4 was flown by Mike Blyth and his son from South Africa to AirVenture in Oshkosh, Wisconsin, United States, carrying 20 hours endurance in fuel. The flight included a 14-hour leg over water.

A Sling 4 kit was completed in four days by 40 workers from the factory, and flown at a 2014 South African Airshow.

In a 2016 detailed review for Flying magazine, writer Marc C. Lee praised the design's controls, handling, aesthetics and load -carrying capabilities, while pointing out that it lacks cruise speed, an effective heater, has poor rubber molding and lacks a USB jack system. He also noted it has no mechanism whereby one could taxi with the gull-wing doors half open or cracked.

A group of about 20 South African teenagers built a Sling 4 in about three weeks in 2019, with the engine and avionics fitted by specialists. and planned to fly it to Cairo.

== Variants ==
Sling 4
Base model with 115 hp (86 kW) Rotax 914UL turbocharged engine, introduced in 2011.
Sling TSi
Model fitting the 141 hp (105 kW) Rotax 915 iS engine, introduced in 2018, with improved aerodynamics, faster cruise speed and a slightly higher useful load.

== Specifications (2016 model Sling 4) ==
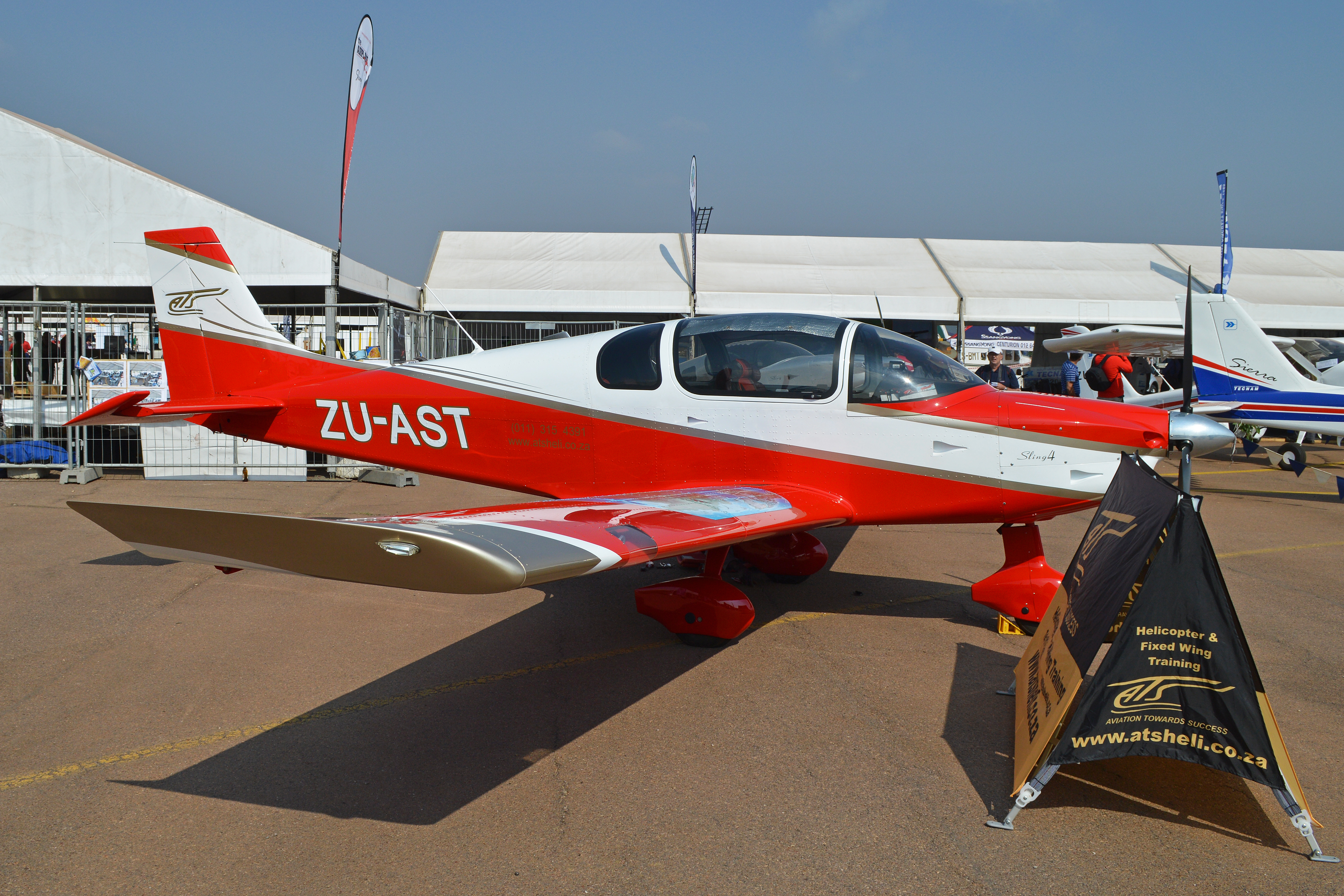
Sling 4

Data from AOPA and manufacturer

General characteristics

- Crew: one
- Capacity: three passengers
- Length: 7.17 m (23.54 ft)
- Wingspan: 9.9 m (32.6 ft)
- Height: 2.4 m (8 ft)
- Wing area: 13.1 m^{2} (141 sq ft)
- Empty weight: 470 kg (1,036 lb)
- Gross weight: 920 kg (2,028 lb)
- Fuel capacity: 43.32 U.S. gallons (164.0 L; 36.07 imp gal) useable
- Powerplant: 1 × Rotax 914UL horizontally-opposed piston aircraft engine, 86 kW (115 hp)
- Propellers: 3-bladed Airmaster Propellers electric constant speed propeller

Performance

- Cruise speed: 240 km/h (150 mph, 130 kn) true airspeed
- Stall speed: 85 km/h (53 mph, 46 kn) full flaps, calibrated airspeed
- Never exceed speed: 250 km/h (155 mph, 135 kn) indicated airspeed
- Range: 1,300 km (810 mi, 700 nmi) at 75% power with 45 minutes reserve
- Service ceiling: 4,600 m (15,000 ft)
- Rate of climb: 4.1 m/s (800 ft/min)
- Wing loading: 70 kg/m^{2} (14.4 lb/sq ft)

== See also ==
Similar aircraft

- Alpi Pioneer 400
- Vans RV-10
