= List of aircraft engines =

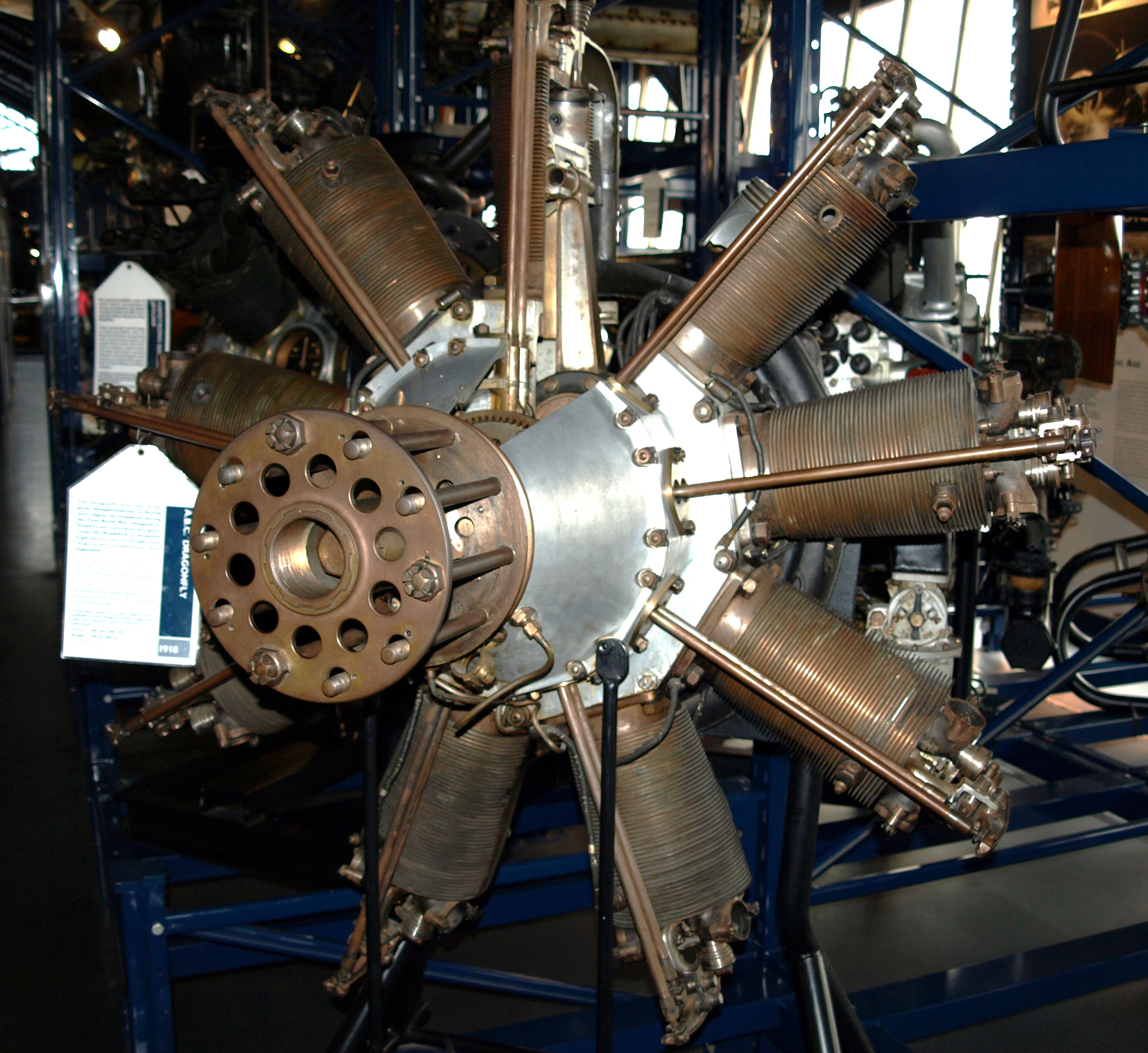
ABC Dragonfly at the London Science Museum

This is an alphabetical list of aircraft engines by manufacturer.

== 0–9 ==
=== 2si ===
- 2si 215
- 2si 230
- 2si 430
- 2si 460
- 2si 500
- 2si 540
- 2si 690

=== 3W ===
Source: RMV

- 3W 106iB2
- 3W-110
- 3W-112
- 3W-170
- 3W-210
- 3W-220

== A ==
=== Abadal (Francisco Serramalera Abadal) ===
- Abadal Y-12 350/400 hp 120 mm × 140 mm (4.7 in × 5.5 in)

=== ABC ===
Source: Lumsden.

- ABC 8 hp
- ABC 30 hp V-4
- ABC 45 hp V-6
- ABC 60 hp V-8
- ABC 85 hp V-6
- ABC 100 hp V-8
- ABC 115 hp
- ABC 170 hp V-12
- ABC 225 hp V-16
- ABC Dragonfly
- ABC Gadfly
- ABC Gnat
- ABC Hornet
- ABC Mosquito
- ABC Scorpion
- ABC Wasp
- ABC type 10 APU
- ABC type 11 APU

=== ABECO ===
Source: RMV

- ABECO GEM

=== Aberg ===
Source: RMV

- Type Sklenar

=== ABLE ===
Source: RMV, Able Experimental Aircraft Engine Co. (Able Experimental Aircraft Engine Co., Altimizer, Hoverhawk (US))

- ABLE 2275
- ABLE 2500
- ABLE VW x 2 Geared Drive

=== Accurate Automation Corp ===
- Accurate Automation AT-1500
- Accurate Automation AT-1700

=== Ace ===
(Ace American Engr Corp, Horace Keane Aeroplane Co, North Beach, Long Island NY.)

- Ace 1919 40 hp

=== ACE ===
(American Cirrus Engine Inc) Source: RMV

- ACE Cirrus
- ACE LA-1 19?? (ATC 31) = 140 hp 7RA. Evolved into Jacobs LA-1.
- ACE Mk III 1929 (ATC 30, 44) = 90 hp 310ci 4LAI; (44) for 110 hp supercharged model.
- ACE Mk III Hi-Drive
- ACE Ensign

=== ACT ===
(Aircraft Cylinder and Turbine Co) Source: RMV

- ACT Super 600

=== Adams ===
Source: RMV

- Adams (UK) 4 Cylinder in-line of 140 HP
- Adams (UK) 8 V

=== Adams-Dorman ===
Source: RMV

- Adams-Dorman 60/80 HP

=== Adams-Farwell ===
The Adams Company, Dubuque, Iowa / F.O. Farwell, engines for gyrocopters

- Adams-Farwell 36 hp 5-cyl rotary engine 4.25 in × 3.25 in (108 mm × 83 mm)
- Adams-Farwell 50 HP
- Adams-Farwell 55 hp 5-cyl rotary 5.25 in × 5 in (133 mm × 127 mm)
- Adams-Farwell 63 hp 5-cyl rotary 5.625 in × 5 in (142.9 mm × 127.0 mm)
- Adams-Farwell 72 hp 5-cyl rotary 6 in × 6 in (150 mm × 150 mm)
- Adams-Farwell 280 hp 6cyl double rotary 6 in × 6 in (150 mm × 150 mm)
- Adams-Farwell 6-cyl double rotary 5 in × 5 in (130 mm × 130 mm)
- Adams-Farwell 10-cyl double rotary 5 in × 5 in (130 mm × 130 mm)
- Adams-Farwell 14-cyl double rotary 5 in × 5 in (130 mm × 130 mm)
- Adams-Farwell 18-cyl double rotary 5 in × 5 in (130 mm × 130 mm)
- Adams-Farwell KM 11

=== ADC ===
ADC (from "Aircraft Disposal Company") bought 35,000 war-surplus engines in 1920. Initially produced engines from Renault 70 hp spares.

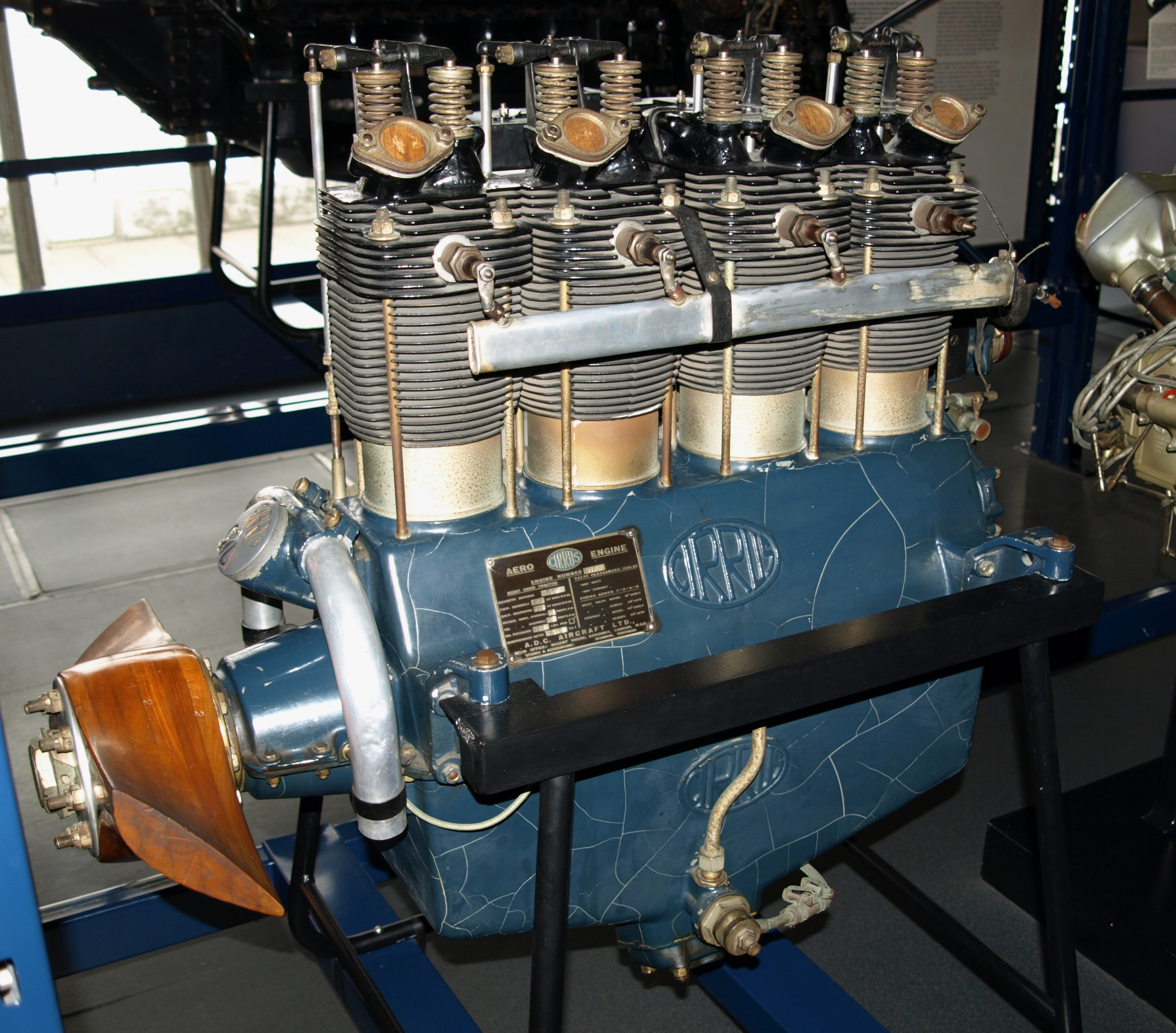
ADC Cirrus

- ADC Airdisco
- ADC Cirrus
- ADC Nimbus, development of Siddeley Puma
- ADC Airsix, air-cooled version of Nimbus. Not put into use
- ADC BR2
- ADC Viper
- ADC Airdisco-Renault

=== Adept-Airmotive ===
Source: RMV

- Adept 280 N
- Adept 300 R
- Adept 320 T

=== Ader ===
Source: RMV

- Ader Eole engine (Vapour)
- Ader Avion engine (Vapour)
- Ader 2V
- Ader 4V

=== Adler ===
Source: RMV

- Adler 50 hp 4-cyl in-line 100 mm × 125 mm (3.9 in × 4.9 in)
- Adler 100 hp 6-cyl in-line 115 mm × 135 mm (4.5 in × 5.3 in)
- Adler 222 hp V-8 116 mm × 160 mm (4.6 in × 6.3 in)

=== Adorjan & Dedics ===
Source: RMV

- Adorjan & Dedics 2V

=== Advance Engines ===
Source: RMV

- Advance 4V, 20/25 HP

=== Advanced Engine Design ===
Source: RMV

- Advanced Engine Design Spitfire 1 Cylinder
- Advanced Engine Design Spitfire 2 Cylinder
- Advanced Engine Design Spitfire 3 Cylinder
- Advanced Engine Design Spitfire 4 Cylinder
- Advanced Engine Design K2-1000
- Advanced Engine Design 110 HP (BMW Conversion)
- Advanced Engine Design 220 LC
- Advanced Engine Design 440 LC
- Advanced Engine Design 660 LC
- Advanced Engine Design 880 LC
- Advanced Engine Design 530 (Kawasaki Conversion)

=== AEADC ===
(Aircraft Engine & Accessory Development Corporation) Source: RMV

- AEADC Gryphon M
- AEADC Gryphon N
- AEADC O-510 (Gryphon M)
- AEADC O-810 (Gryphon N)

=== AEC ===
Source: RMV

- AEC Keane

=== Aeolus Flugmotor ===
Source: RMV

=== Aerien CC ===
Source: RMV

- Aerien 20/25 HP
- Aerien 30 HP

=== Aermacchi ===
Source: RMV

- Aermacchi MB-2

=== Aero & Marine ===
- Aero & Marine 50 HP

=== Aero Adventure ===
Source: RMV

- Aero Adventure GFL-2000

=== AeroConversions ===
- AeroConversions AeroVee 2180

=== Aero Development ===
Source: RMV (See SPEER)

=== Aero Engines Ltd. ===
(formerly William Douglas (Bristol) Ltd.)

- Aero Engines Dryad
- Aero Engines Pixie
- Aero Engines Sprite
- Aero Engines inverted V-4
- Aero Engines inverted V-6
- Douglas 750cc

=== Aero Motion ===
Source: RMV

- Aero Motion 0-100
- Aero Motion 0-101

=== Aero Motors ===
Source: RMV

- Aero Motors Aerobat 150 HP

=== Aero Pixie ===
Source: RMV

- Aero Pixie 153 cc, 2T

=== Aero Prag ===
Source: RMV

- Aeroprag KT-422
- Aeroprag AP-45
- Aeroprag TP-422

=== Aero Products ===
(Aero Products Aeronautical Products Corp, Naugatuck CT.) Source: RMV

- Aero Products Scorpion 100 HP

=== Aero Sled ===
Source: RMV

- Aero Sled Twin Flat, 20 HP

=== Aero Sport International ===
Source: RMV

- Aero Sport International Wade Aero (WANKEL) 2 Types

=== AeroTwin Motors Corporation ===
- AeroTwin AT972T

=== Aerojet ===
Aerojet produced rocket engines for missiles. It merged with Pratt & Whitney Rocketdyne.

- Aerojet LR1 (Aerojet 25AL-1000)
- Aerojet LR3 (Aerojet 25ALD-1000)
- Aerojet LR5 (Aerojet X40ALD-3000)
- Aerojet LR7 (Aerojet ZCALT-6000)
- Aerojet LR9 (Aerojet X4AL-1000)
- Aerojet LR13 (Aerojet X60ALD-4000 / Aerojet 4.104a / Aerojet 4.103a)
- Aerojet LR15 (Aerojet XCNLT-1500)
- Aerojet LR45 (Aerojet AJ24-1)
- Aerojet LR49
- Aerojet LR51
- Aerojet LR53
- Aerojet LR59 (CIM-99 Bomarc booster engine)
- Aerojet LR87
- Aerojet LR91
- Aerojet-General SR19 (Aerojet Minuteman 2nd stage motor)
- Aerojet 1KS-2800A
- Aerojet 2KS-11000 (X102C1)
- Aerojet 2KS-33000A
- Aerojet 2.2KS-33000
- Aerojet 2.5KS-18000 (X103C1)
- Aerojet 5KS-4500
- Aerojet 12AS-250 Junior
- Aerojet 14AS-1000 (D-5) – RATO unit
- Aerojet 15KS-1000 RATO unit
- Aerojet 15NS-250
- Aerojet 30AS-1000C – RATO unit
- Aerojet 2.2KS-11000
- Aerojet AJ10
- Aerojet AJ-260 – largest solid-rocket motor ever built
- Aerojet M-1
- Aerojet Hawk motor (for Hawk SAM)
- Aerojet Polaris motor
- Aerojet Senior

=== Aeromarine Company ===
Source: RMV

- Aeromarine Company D5-1 (Pulse-Jet)

=== Aeromarine ===
- Aeromarine AL
- Aeromarine NAL
- Aeromarine S
- Aeromarine S-12
- Aeromarine AR-3
  - Aeromarine AR-3-40
- Aeromarine AR-5
- Aeromarine AR-7
- Aeromarine AL-24
- Aeromarine B-9
- Aeromarine B-45
- Aeromarine B-90
- Aeromarine D-12 150 hp 4.3125 in × 5.125 in (109.54 mm × 130.18 mm)
- Aeromarine K-6
- Aeromarine L-6 130 hp 4.25 in × 6.5 in (108 mm × 165 mm)
  - Aeromarine L-6-D (direct drive)
  - Aeromarine L-6-G (geared)
- Aeromarine L-8 192 hp 4.25 in × 6.5 in (108 mm × 165 mm)
- Aeromarine RAD
- Aeromarine T-6
- Aeromarine U-6
  - Aeromarine U-6-D
- Aeromarine U-8
  - Aeromarine U-8-873
  - Aeromarine U-8D
- Aeromarine 85 hp 1914
- Aeromarine 90hp
- Aeromarine 100 hp V-8 3.5 in × 5.125 in (88.9 mm × 130.2 mm)

=== Aeromax ===
Source: RMV

- Aeromax 100 I-F-B
- Aeromax 100 L-D

=== Aeromotion ===
See: AMI

=== Aeromotor ===
(Detroit Aeromotor. Const. Co) Source: RMV

- Aeromotor 30 hp 4-cyl in-line
- Aeromotor 75 hp 6-cyl in-line

=== Aeronamic ===
Source: RMV

- Aeronamic ATS

=== Aeronautical Engineering Co. ===
Source: RMV

- Aeronautical Engineering 9-cyl radial 200 HP

=== Aeronca ===
- Aeronca E-107 (O-107)
- Aeronca E-113 (O-113)

=== Aeroplane Motors Company ===
(Aeroplane Motors) Source: RMV

- Aeroplane 59 hp V-8 3.98 in × 4.72 in (101 mm × 120 mm)

=== Aeroprotech ===
Source: RMV

- Aeroprotech VW 2.3

=== Aerosila ===
Source: RMV

- Aerosila TA-4 FE
- Aerosila 6 A/U
- Aerosila 8 N/K
- Aerosila 12
- Aerosila 12-60
- Aerosila 14 (-032,-130,-35)
- Aerosila 18-100 (-200)
- GTTP-300

=== Aerosport ===
- Aerosport-Rockwell LB600

=== Aerostar ===
Source: RMV

- Aerostar M14P
- Aerostar M14V-26

=== Aerotech engines ===
Source: RMV

- Aerotech 2 Cylinder 2T

=== Aerotech-PL ===
Source: RMV

- Aerotech-PL EA81, Subaru conversion
- Aerotech-PL VW conversion
- Aerotech-PL BMW conversion
- Aerotech-PL Suzuki conversion
- Aerotech-PL Guzzi conversion

=== Aerotechnik ===
Source: RMV

- Aerotechnik Tatra-100
- Aerotechnik Tatra-102
- Aerotechnik Hirth (Lic)
- Aerotechnik Mikron (Lic)
- Aerotechnik Tatra-714 (VW)

=== Aerotek ===
Source: RMV

- Aerotek Mazda RX-7 (conversion)

=== AES ===
(See Rev-Air)

=== Affordable Turbine Power ===
Source: RMV

- Affordable Turbine Power Model 6.5

=== AFR ===
Source: RMV

- AFR BMW Conversion
- AFR R 100 70/80 hp
- AFR R 1100D 90/100 hp
- AFR R 1100S 98 hp
- AFR R 1150RT 95 hp
- AFR R 1200GS 100 hp

=== Agilis ===
(Agilis Engines) Sources: RMV

- Agilis TF-800
- Agilis TF-1000
- Agilis TF-1200
- Agilis TF-1400
- Agilis TF-1500
- Agilis TJ-60 (MT-60)
- Agilis TJ-75
- Agilis TJ-80
- Agilis TJ-400

=== Agusta ===
- Agusta GA.40
- Agusta GA.70
- Agusta GA.140
- Agusta A.270
- Turbomeca-Agusta TA.230

=== Ahrbecker Son and Hankers ===
Source: RMV

- Ahrbecker Son and Hankers 10 HP
- Ahrbecker Son and Hankers 20 HP
- Ahrbecker Son and Hankers 1 Cylinder – vapor

=== AIC ===
(Aviation Ind. China. See Catic and Carec)

=== Aichi ===
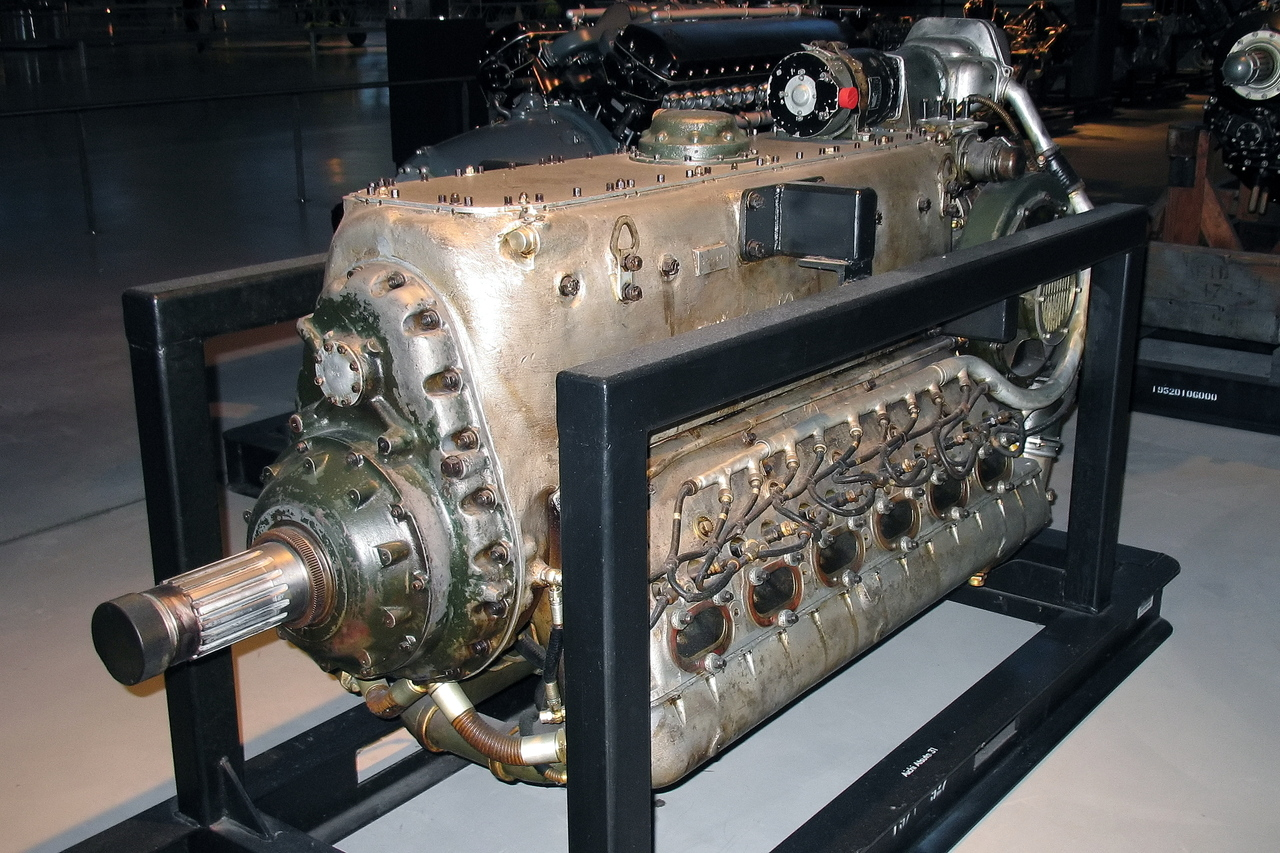
A preserved Aichi Atsuta

Source:Gunston 1989 except where noted.

- Aichi AC-1
- Aichi Atsuta (Atsuta 31) – Licence-builtDaimler-Benz DB 601A for IJN
  - Aichi AE1A (Atsuta 21)
  - Aichi AE1P (Atsuta 32)
- Aichi Ha-70 (Coupled Atsuta 30s)

=== AICTA ===
(AICTA Design Work, Prague, Czech Republic)

- AICTA LMD 416-00R

=== Aile Volante ===
- Aile Volante C.C.2
- Aile Volante C.C.4

=== Air Repair Incorporated ===
Source: RMV (Jacobs Licence)

- Air Repair Incorporated L-4
- Air Repair Incorporated L-5
- Air Repair Incorporated L-6

(Jacobs-Page Licence)

- Air Repair Incorporated R755

=== Air Ryder ===
Source: RMV

- Air Ryder Subaru EA-81 (Conversion)

=== Air Technical Arsenal ===
Source: RMV

- Air Technical Arsenal TSU-11
- Air Technical Arsenal TR-30

=== Air-Craft Engine Corp ===
Source: RMV

- Air-Craft Engine Corp LA-1

=== Aircat ===
(Detroit Aircraft Eng. Corp.) Source: RMV

- Aircat Radial 5 cylinders

=== Aircooled Motors ===
See: Franklin

=== Aircraft Engine Co ===
(Aircraft Engine Co Inc, Oakland, CA)

- Aircraft 1911 80 hp

=== Aircraft & Ind. Motor Corp ===
(See Schubert)

=== AiResearch ===
See: Garrett, Allied Signal and Honeywell

=== Airex ===
- Airex Rx2
- Airex Rx10

=== Airmotive-Perito ===
See: Adept-Airmotive

=== Airship Aircraft Engine Company ===
- Airship A-Tech 100 Diesel

=== Airtrike ===
(AirTrike GmbH i.L., Berlin, Germany)

- Airtrike 850ti

=== AISA ===
Source: RMV

- Ramjet on rotor

=== Aixro ===
Source: RMV

- Aixro XF-40
- Aixro XH-40
- Aixro XP-40
- Aixro XR-30
- Aixro XR-40
- Aixro XR-50

=== Ajax ===
Source: RMV

- Ajax 7-cyl rotary
- Ajax 6-cyl radial (2 rows of 3 cyls.), 80 HP

=== Akkerman ===
- Akkerman Model 235 30 HP, special fuel

=== Akron ===
- Funk E200
- Funk E4L

=== Albatross ===
(Albatross Co Detroit)

- Albatross 50 hp 6-cyl radial 4.5 in × 5 in (110 mm × 130 mm)
- Albatross 100 hp 6-cyl radial 5.5 in × 5 in (140 mm × 130 mm)

=== Aldasoro ===
- Aldasoro aero engine

=== Alexander ===
- Alexander 4-cyl
- Alexanderradial 5-cyl

=== Alfa Romeo ===
Societa per Azioni Alfa Romeo

- Romeo 600 hp V-12
- Alfa Romeo V-6 diesel
- Alfa Romeo V-12 diesel
- Alfa Romeo D2
- Alfa Romeo 100 or RA.1100
- Alfa Romeo 101 or RA.1101
- Alfa Romeo 110/111
- Alfa Romeo 115/116
- Alfa Romeo 121
- Alfa Romeo 122
- Alfa Romeo 125/126/127/128/129/131
- Alfa Romeo 135/136
- Alfa Romeo 138 R.C.23/65
- RA.1000 Monsone – licensed Daimler-Benz DB 601
- Alfa Romeo RA.1050
- Alfa Romeo RA.1100 or AR.100
- Alfa Romeo RA.1101 or AR.101
- Alfa Romeo AR.318
- Alfa Romeo Dux
- Alfa Romeo Jupiter – licensed Bristol Jupiter
- Alfa Romeo Lynx/Lince – licensed Armstrong Siddeley Lynx
- Alfa Romeo Mercury
- Alfa Romeo Pegasus

=== Alfaro ===
- Alfaro baby engine
- Alfaro 155 hp 4-cyl barrel engine

=== Allen ===
- Allen O-675

=== Alliance ===
(Aubrey W. Hess/Alliance Aircraft Corporation)

- Hess Warrior

=== Allied ===
- Allied Monsoon Licensed manufacturer of French Règnier 4L

=== AlliedSignal ===
- AlliedSignal TPE-331
- Garrett TPF351
- AlliedSignal LTS101
- AlliedSignal ALF502/LF507

=== Allis-Chalmers ===
Source: Gunston

- Allis-Chalmers J36

=== Allison ===
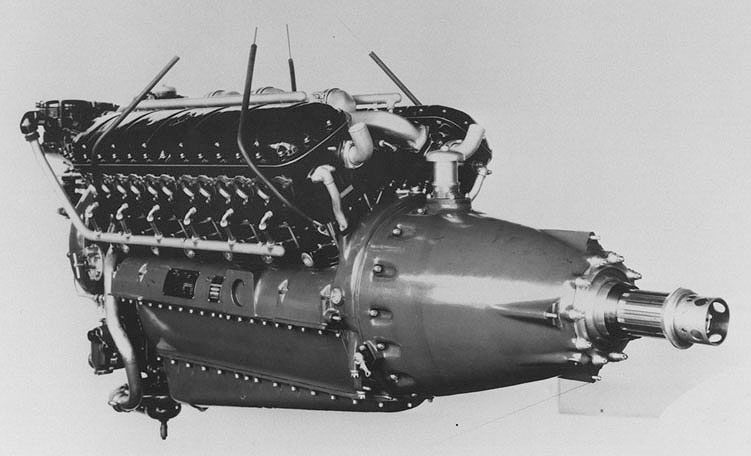
Allison V-1710

- Allison V-1410 – Liberty L-12
- Allison V-1650 – Liberty L-12
- Allison V-1710
- Allison V-3420
- Allison X-4520
- Allison 250 (T63)(T703)
- Allison 252
- Allison 504
- Allison 545
- Allison 550
- Pratt & Whitney/Allison 578-DX
- Allison J33 (Allison 400)
- Allison J35 (Allison 450)
- Allison J56
- Allison J71
- Allison J89
- Allison J102
- Allison T38
- Allison T39
- Allison T40 (Allison 500, 503)
- Allison T44
- Allison T54
- Allison T56 (501-D)
- Allison T61
- Allison T63
- Allison T71
- Allison T78
- Allison T80
- Allison T406 (AE1107)
- Allison T701 (Allison 501-M62)
- Allison T703 (Allison 250)
- Allison TF32
- Allison TF41 (development of Rolls-Royce Spey)
- Allison GMA 200
- Allison GMA 500
- Allison AE3010
- Allison AE3012
- Allison PD-37 Pyrodyne

=== Almen ===
- Almen A-4

=== Alvaston ===
- Alvaston 20 hp 2-cyl opposed 114 mm × 114 mm (4.5 in × 4.5 in)
- Alvaston 30 hp 2-cyl opposed 132 mm × 127 mm (5.2 in × 5.0 in)
- Alvaston 50 hp 4-cyl opposed 144 mm × 128 mm (5.7 in × 5.0 in)

=== Alvis ===
- Alvis Alcides
- Alvis Alcides Major
- Alvis Leonides
- Alvis Leonides Major
- Alvis Maeonides Major
- Alvis Pelides
- Alvis Pelides Major

=== American Cirrus Engine ===
See: ACE

=== American Engineering Corporation ===
Source: RMV

- ACE Keane

=== American Helicopter ===
- American Helicopter PJ49 Pulsejet
- American Helicopter XPJ49-AH-3

=== American Motor & Aviation Co ===
- American 1911 rotary
- American S-5 radial

=== AMCEL ===
(AMCEL Propulsion Company)

- AMCEL controllable solid fuel rocket

=== AMI ===
(AeroMotion Inc.)

- AeroMotion Twin
- AeroMotion O-100 Twin
- AeroMotion O-101 Twin

=== AMT Netherlands ===
(Aviation Microjet Technology)

- AMT Olympus
- AMT Titan
- AMT Lynx

=== AMT USA ===
(AMT USA, LLC, Cincinnati)

- AMT-450

=== A.M.U.A.L ===
(Établissement A.M.U.A.L)

- A.M.U.A.L M.J.5 65° V-8 350 hp 150 mm × 200 mm (5.9 in × 7.9 in)
- A.M.U.A.L M.J.6 90° V-8 400 hp 150 mm × 200 mm (5.9 in × 7.9 in)
- A.M.U.A.L M.J.7 90° V-8 600 hp 180 mm × 210 mm (7.1 in × 8.3 in)

=== Angle ===
- Angle 100 hp Radial

=== Ansaldo ===
- Ansaldo San Giorgio 4E-145 6I 300 hp
- Ansaldo San Giorgio 4E-150 6I 300 hp
- Ansaldo San Giorgio 4E-284 V-12 450 hp
- Ansaldo San Giorgio 4E-290 V-12 550 hp

=== Antoinette ===
Source:Gunston

- Antoinette 32 hp V-8 80 mm × 80 mm (3.1 in × 3.1 in)
- Antoinette 46 hp?
- Antoinette 64 hp V-16 80 mm × 80 mm (3.1 in × 3.1 in)
- Antoinette 67hp V-8 110 mm × 105 mm (4.3 in × 4.1 in)
- Antoinette 165 hp V-16
- Antoinette 134 hp V-8 110 mm × 105 mm (4.3 in × 4.1 in)
- Antoinette 55 hp V-8
- Antoinette V-32

=== Anzani ===
For British Anzani products see: British Anzani

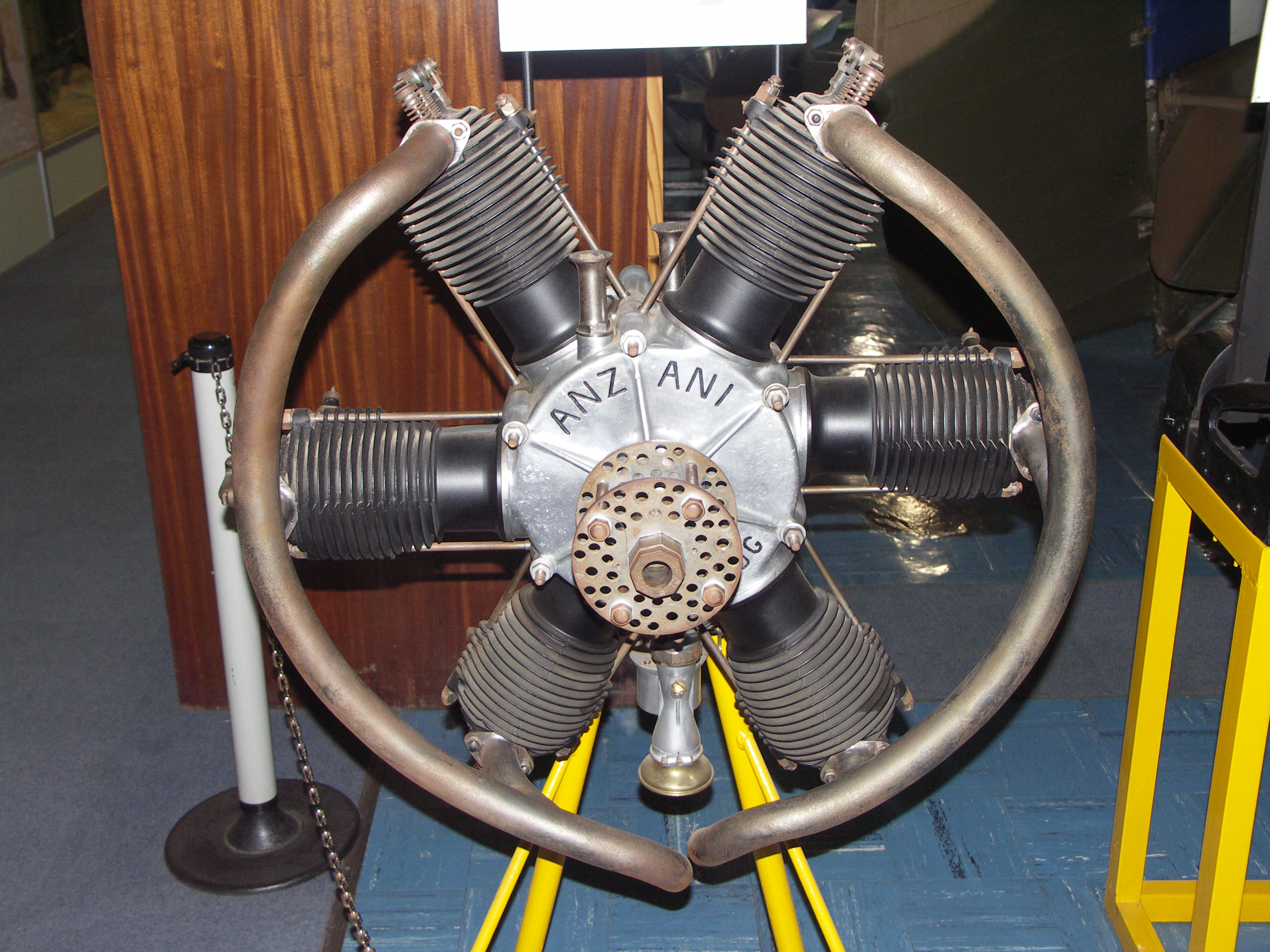
Anzani 6

Air-cooled Anzani engines

- Anzani V-2
- Anzani 3-cylinder fan engines
  - Anzani 14 hp 85 mm × 85 mm (3.3 in × 3.3 in)
  - Anzani 15 hp 85 mm × 100 mm (3.3 in × 3.9 in)
  - Anzani 24.5 hp 105 mm × 130 mm (4.1 in × 5.1 in)
  - Anzani 31.6 hp 120 mm × 130 mm (4.7 in × 5.1 in)
  - Anzani 42.3 hp 135 mm × 150 mm (5.3 in × 5.9 in)
  - Anzani 10-12 hp 85 mm × 85 mm (3.3 in × 3.3 in)
  - Anzani 12-15 hp 85 mm × 100 mm (3.3 in × 3.9 in)
  - Anzani 25-30 hp 105 mm × 130 mm (4.1 in × 5.1 in)
  - Anzani 30-35 hp 120 mm × 130 mm (4.7 in × 5.1 in)
  - Anzani 40-45 hp 135 mm × 150 mm (5.3 in × 5.9 in)
  - Anzani 45-50 hp
- Anzani 30hp 3-cyl radial 105 mm × 120 mm (4.1 in × 4.7 in)
- Anzani 45 hp 5-cyl radial
- Anzani 60 hp 5-cyl radial
- Anzani 6-cylinder
  - Anzani 40-45 hp radial 90 mm × 120 mm (3.5 in × 4.7 in)
  - Anzani 50-60 hp radial 105 mm × 120 mm (4.1 in × 4.7 in)
  - Anzani 70 hp radial 105 mm × 120 mm (4.1 in × 4.7 in)
  - Anzani 80 hp radial 115 mm × 140 mm (4.5 in × 5.5 in)
- Anzani 95 hp 7-cyl radial
- Anzani 10-cylinder
  - Anzani 60-70 hp radial 90 mm × 120 mm (3.5 in × 4.7 in)
  - Anzani 100-110 hp radial 105 mm × 140 mm (4.1 in × 5.5 in)
  - Anzani 95-100 hp radial 105 mm × 145 mm (4.1 in × 5.7 in)
  - Anzani 125 hp radial 115 mm × 150 mm (4.5 in × 5.9 in)
  - Anzani 125 hp radial 115 mm × 155 mm (4.5 in × 6.1 in)
  - Anzani 200 hp radial
- Anzani 100 hp 14-cyl radial 105 mm × 140 mm (4.1 in × 5.5 in)
- Anzani 150-160 hp 14-cyl radial 90 mm × 120 mm (3.5 in × 4.7 in)
- Anzani 20 200 hp 20-cyl radial 105 mm × 140 mm (4.1 in × 5.5 in)

Water-cooled Anzani engines

- Anzani 30-32 hp V-4 100 mm × 120 mm (3.9 in × 4.7 in)
- Anzani 56-70 hp V-4 135 mm × 150 mm (5.3 in × 5.9 in)
- Anzani 600-700 hp 20-cyl radial 140 mm × 150 mm (5.5 in × 5.9 in) In-line radial 10 banks of 2 cylinders
- Anzani W-6
- Anzani 6A3 (6-cyl radial 60 hp)

=== ARDEM ===
(Avions Roger Druine Engines M)

- Ardem 4 CO2

=== Ares ===
(Ares ltd., Finland)

- Ares diesel Cirrus

=== Argus Motoren ===
Source:Gunston except where noted

- Argus Type I ("50hp") – 4-cyl. 50-70 hp 4.88 in × 5.12 in (124 mm × 130 mm))
- Argus Type II (4-cyl. 100 hp 5.51 in × 5.51 in (140 mm × 140 mm))
- Argus Type III (aka Argus 110 hp) – 6-cyl 4.88 in × 5.12 in (124 mm × 130 mm))
- Argus Type IV (aka 140/150 hp) – 4-cyl. 140 hp 6.1 in × 6.5 in (150 mm × 170 mm))
- Argus Type V (6-cyl. 140 hp 5.51 in × 5.51 in (140 mm × 140 mm))
- Argus Type VI (6-cyl. 140 hp 6.1 in × 6.5 in (150 mm × 170 mm))
- Argus Type VII (6-cyl. 115-130 hp 5.12 in × 5.12 in (130 mm × 130 mm))
- Argus Type VIII (6-cyl. 190 hp 5.91 in × 5.7 in (150 mm × 145 mm))
- Argus As I 4-cylinder, 100-hp, year 1913
- Argus As II, 6-cylinder, 120-hp, year 1914
- Argus As III 6-cylinder upright inline
- Argus As 5 24-cylinder in-line radial (6 banks of four cylinders)
- Argus As VI 700 hp V-12
- Argus As VIA
- Argus As 7 9R 700 hp
- Argus As 8 4-cylinder inverted inline
- Argus As 10 8-cylinder inverted V
- Argus As 12 16H 550 hp
- Argus As 16 4-cylinder horizontally opposed 35 hp
- Argus As 014 (aka "Argus 109-014") – pulse jet engine for V-1 flying bomb and Tornado boat
- Argus As 044
- Argus As 16 4-cylinder inverted inline 40 hp
- Argus As 17 6-cylinder inverted inline 225 hp / 285 hp
- Argus As 401 development and renumbering of the As 10
- Argus As 402
- Argus As 410 12-cylinder inverted V
- Argus As 411 12-cylinder inverted V
- Argus As 412 24-cylinder H-block, prototyped
- Argus As 413 – similar to 412, never built
- Argus 109-044
- Argus 115 hp 6-cylinder upright inline 130 mm × 130 mm (5.1 in × 5.1 in)
- Argus 130 hp 6-cylinder upright inline 130 mm × 130 mm (5.1 in × 5.1 in)
- Argus 145 hp 6-cylinder upright inline 140 mm × 140 mm (5.5 in × 5.5 in)
- Argus 190 hp 6-cylinder upright inline 150 mm × 145 mm (5.9 in × 5.7 in)

=== Argylls ===
- Argyll aircraft engine

=== Armstrong Siddeley ===
Armstrong Siddeley was formed by purchase of Siddeley-Deasy in 1919.

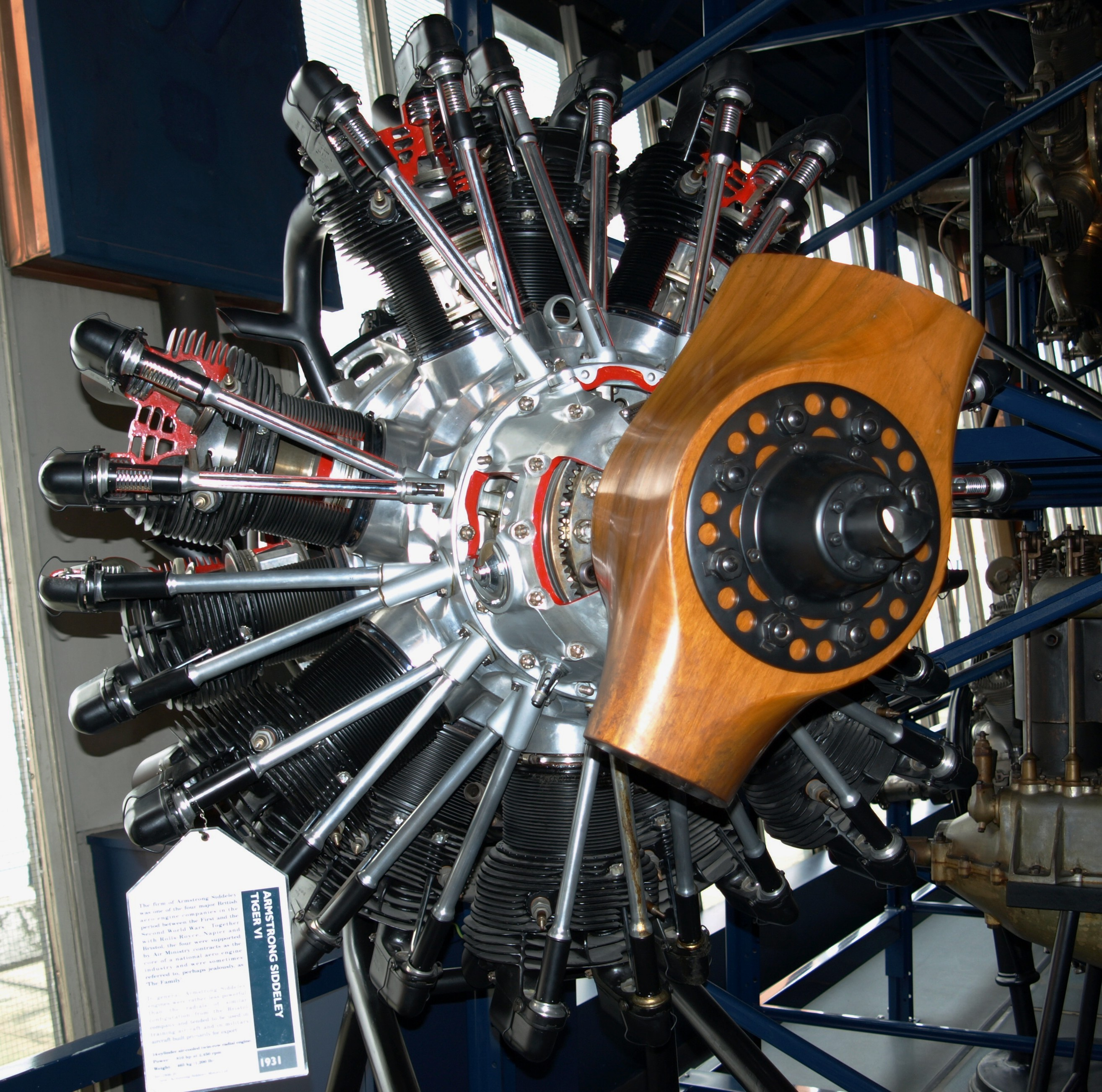
Armstrong Siddeley Tiger at the London Science Museum

Piston Engines

- Armstrong Siddeley Terrier
- Armstrong Siddeley Mastiff
- Armstrong Siddeley Boarhound
- Armstrong Siddeley Cheetah
- Armstrong Siddeley Civet
- Armstrong Siddeley Cougar
- Armstrong Siddeley Deerhound
- Armstrong Siddeley Genet
- Armstrong Siddeley Genet Major
- Armstrong Siddeley Hyena
- Armstrong Siddeley Jaguar
- Armstrong Siddeley Leopard
- Armstrong Siddeley Lynx
- Armstrong Siddeley Mongoose
- Armstrong Siddeley Ounce
- Armstrong Siddeley Panther
- Armstrong Siddeley Puma – originally the Siddeley Puma
- Armstrong Siddeley Serval
- Armstrong Siddeley Tiger
- Armstrong Siddeley Wolfhound – paper project of developed Deerhound

Gas turbines

- Armstrong Siddeley Adder
- Armstrong Siddeley ASX
- Armstrong Siddeley Double Mamba
- Armstrong Siddeley Mamba
- Armstrong Siddeley Python
- Armstrong Siddeley Sapphire
- Armstrong Siddeley Viper

Rocket engines

- Armstrong Siddeley Alpha
- Armstrong Siddeley Beta
- Armstrong Siddeley Delta
- Armstrong Siddeley Gamma
- Armstrong Siddeley Screamer
- Armstrong Siddeley Snarler
- Armstrong Siddeley Spartan
- Armstrong Siddeley Stentor

=== Armstrong Whitworth ===
- Armstrong Whitworth 1918 30° V-12

=== Arrow SNC ===
- Arrow 250
- Arrow 270 AC
- Arrow 500
- Arrow 1000

=== Arsenal ===
Source:Gunston

- Arsenal 213
- Arsenal 12H
- Arsenal 12H-Tandem
- Arsenal 12K
- Arsenal 24H
- Arsenal 24H-Tandem

=== Asahina ===
- Asahina 9-cyl 100 hp rotary

=== Ashmusen ===
(Ashmusen Manufacturing Company)

- Ashmusen 1908 60 hp 8HOA
- Ashmusen 1908 105 hp 12HOA

=== Aspin ===
(F.M. Aspin & Company)

- Aspin Flat-Four

=== Aster ===
- Aster 51 hp 4-cylinder-line

=== Astrodyne ===
(Astrodyne Inc.)

- Astrodyne 16NS-1000
- Astrodyne XM-34 (ZELL booster)

=== ATAR ===
(Atelier Technique Aéronautique de Rickenbach – pre SNECMA take-over)

- ATAR 101
- ATAR 103
- ATAR 104 (Vulcain)
- ATAR 201
- ATAR 202
- ATAR 203

=== Atwood ===
(Atwood Aeronautic Company, Williamsport, PA / Harry N. Atwood)

- Atwood 120-180 hp V-12 (3.5 in × 4.5 in (89 mm × 114 mm) bore x stroke
- Atwood M-1 (1916)
- Atwood M-2 (1916)
- Atwood Twin Six

=== Aubier & Dunne ===
Data from:Italian Civil & Military Aircraft 1930–1945

- Aubier & Dunne 2-cyl 17 hp
- Aubier & Dunne 3-cyl
- Aubier-Dunne V.2D

=== Austin ===
- Austin V-12
- Austin rotary engine

=== Austro-Daimler ===
Source:Gunston

- Austro-Daimler 35-40 hp 4-cyl. (35-40 hp 100 mm × 120 mm (3.94 in × 4.72 in))
- Austro-Daimler 65-70 hp 4-cyl. (65-70 hp 120 mm × 140 mm (4.72 in × 5.51 in))
- Austro-Daimler 90hp 6-cyl. (90 hp 120 mm × 140 mm (4.72 in × 5.51 in))
- Austro-Daimler 120hp 6-cyl. (120 hp 130 mm × 175 mm (5.12 in × 6.89 in))
- Austro-Daimler 160hp 6-cyl.
- Austro-Daimler 185hp 6-cyl.
- Austro-Daimler 200hp 6-cyl. (200 hp 135 mm × 175 mm (5.31 in × 6.89 in))
- Austro-Daimler 210hp 6-cyl.
- Austro-Daimler 225hp 6-cyl.
- Austro-Daimler 300 hp V-12
- Austro-Daimler 360 hp 6-cyl (360 hp 130 mm × 175 mm (5.12 in × 6.89 in))
- Austro-Daimler 400 hp V-12 (400 hp 130 mm × 175 mm (5.12 in × 6.89 in))
- Austro-Daimler D-35 (400 hp 130 mm × 175 mm (5.12 in × 6.89 in))

=== Austro Engine ===
- Austro Engine E4 (AE 300)
- Austro Engine AE50R
- Austro Engine AE75R
- Austro Engine AE80R
- Austro Engine AE500
- Austro Engine GIAE110R

=== Auto Diesels ===
- Auto Diesels STAD A250
- Auto Diesels STAD A260
- Auto Diesels LPI Mk.12A/L
- Auto Diesels LPI Mk.12A/T
- Auto Diesels LPI Mk.12A/D
- Auto Diesels GT15
- Auto Diesels 7660.001.020

=== Ava ===
(L'Agence General des Moteurs Ava)

- Ava 4A

=== Avco Lycoming ===
See: Lycoming

=== Avia Motors ===
Avia Wytwórnia Maszyn Precyzjnych
- Avia 3
- Avia Vr-30
- Avia Vr-36
- Avia WZ-7
- Avia WZ-100
Avia Akciova Spolecnost pro Prumysel Letecky
- Avia Rk.12
- Avia Rk.17
- Avia Rkr.18
- Avia L
- Avia DFTr
- Avia R.7
- Avia R.10
- Avia DR.14
- Avia DR.20
- Avia Rr.29
- Avia Vr.30
- Avia Vr.36
- Avia W.44
- Avia Wr.44
Avia Narodny Podnik
- M108H
- Avia M-04
- Avia M110H
- Avia M132
- Avia M137
- Avia M202
- Avia M208
- Avia M332
- Avia M337
- Avia M431
- Avia M441
- Avia M437
- Avia M462

=== Aviadvigatel ===
- Aviadvigatel PD-14
- Aviadvigatel PS-90

=== Aviatik ===
Argus engines sold in France under the brand name 'Aviatik' by Automobil und Aviatik AG

- Aviatik 70hp 4-cyl in-line 124 mm × 130 mm (4.9 in × 5.1 in)
- Aviatik 100hp 4-cyl in-line 140 mm × 140 mm (5.5 in × 5.5 in)
- Aviatik 150hp 4-cyl in-line 155 mm × 165 mm (6.1 in × 6.5 in)

=== A.V. Roe ===
- A.V. Roe 20 hp 2-cyl.

=== Avro ===
- Avro Alpha

=== Avro Canada ===
- Avro Chinook
- Avro Iroquois
- Avro Orenda
- Avro P.35 Waconda

=== Axelson ===
- Axelson A-7-R 115 hp
- Axelson-Floco B 150 hp

=== Axial Vector Engine Corporation ===
- Dyna-Cam

=== Aztatl ===
- Aztatl 3-cyl radial
- Aztatl 6-cyl 80 hp radial
- Aztatl 10-cyl radial

== B ==
=== Bailey ===
- Bailey C-7-R "Bull's Eye" 1927 = 140 hp 7RA.

=== Bailey Aviation ===
- Bailey B200
- Bailey Hornet
- Bailey V5 engine

=== Baradat–Esteve ===
(Claudio Baradat Guillé & Carlos Esteve)

- Baradat toroidal engine

=== Basse und Selve ===
- Basse und Selve BuS. 120 hp (125 mm × 160 mm (4.9 in × 6.3 in) 120-130 hp)
- Basse und Selve BuS.III 150 hp
- Basse und Selve BuS.IV (160 mm × 200 mm (6.3 in × 7.9 in) / 155 mm × 200 mm (6.1 in × 7.9 in) 260 hp / 270 hp)
- Basse und Selve BuS.IVa 300 hp

=== Bates ===
Data from:

- Bates 29 hp V-4

=== Bayerische ===
(Bayerische Motoren Gesellschaft)

- Bayerische 7-cyl 50 hp rotary

=== Beardmore ===
Source: Lumsden

- Beardmore 120 hp
- Beardmore 160 hp
- Beardmore Simoon
- Beardmore Cyclone
- Beardmore Tornado
- Beardmore Typhoon
- Galloway Adriatic
- Galloway Atlantic

=== Béarn ===
Construction Mécanique du Béarn/Société de Construction et d'Exploitation de Matériels et de Moteurs

- Béarn 6
- Béarn 12A
- Béarn 12B

=== Beatty ===
- Beatty 40 hp 4-cyl.(4.375 in × 4 in (111.1 mm × 101.6 mm))
- Beatty 50 hp 4-cyl.(4.375 in × 4.5 in (111.1 mm × 114.3 mm))
- Beatty 60 hp 4-cyl. (geared 0.66:1 4.375 in × 5 in (111.1 mm × 127.0 mm))
- Beatty 80 hp 8-cyl. V-8 (4.375 in × 4 in (111.1 mm × 101.6 mm))

=== Beck ===
- Beck 1910 toroidal engine
- Beck 35 hp 4cyl toroidal engine 80 mm × 130 mm (3.1 in × 5.1 in)
- Beck 50 hp 4cyl toroidal engine 110 mm × 130 mm (4.3 in × 5.1 in)
- Beck 75 hp 4cyl toroidal engine 120 mm × 130 mm (4.7 in × 5.1 in)

=== Beecher ===
(B.L. Beecher Company, New Haven, Connecticut)

- Beecher 8HOA

=== Bell Aerosystems Company ===
- Bell Model 117
- Bell Model 8001
- Bell Model 8048
- Bell Model 8081
- Bell Model 8096
- Bell Model 8096-39
- Bell Model 8096A
- Bell Model 8096B
- Bell Model 8096L
- Bell Model 8247
- Bell Model 8533
- Bell LR67
- Bell XLR-81
- Bell XLR-81-BA-3
- Bell XLR-81-BA-5
- Bell XLR-81-BA-7
- Bell XLR-81-BA-11
- Bell XLR-81-BA-13
- Bell Hustler
- Bell Nike-Ajax engine

=== Bentley ===
- Bentley BR1
- Bentley BR2

=== Benz ===
Source:Gunston

- Benz 195 hp
- Benz FX
- Benz Bz.I (Type FB)
- Benz Bz.II (Type FD)
- Benz Bz.III (Type FF)
- Benz Bz.IIIa
- Benz Bz.IIIav
- Benz Bz.IIIb
- Benz Bz.IV
- Benz Bz.IVa
- Benz Bz.V
- Benz Bz.Vb
- Benz Bz.VI
- Benz Bz.VIv

=== Berliner ===
- Berliner 6 hp rotary helicopter engine

=== Bertin ===
- Bertin 50 hp X-4
- Bertin 100 hp X-8

=== Besler ===
See: Doble-Besler

=== Beaussier ===
(Moteurs Beaussier)

- Beaussier 4-cyl

=== Bessonov ===
(A. A. Bessonov)

- Bessonov MM-1

=== Better Half ===
- Better Half VW

=== Beardmore Halford Pullinger (B.H.P.) ===
- Adriatic
- Atlantic
- 230 hp – built by Galloway and Siddeley-Deasy developed into Siddeley Puma

=== Binetti ===
- Binetti B-300

=== Blackburn ===
Includes engines of Cirrus Engine Division of Blackburn Source: Lumsden

- Blackburn Cirrus – originally ADC Cirrus,
- Blackburn Cirrus Midget
- Blackburn Cirrus Minor
- Blackburn Cirrus Major
- Blackburn Cirrus Bombardier
- Blackburn Cirrus Grenadier
- Blackburn Cirrus Musketeer
- Blackburn Nimbus
- Blackburn Artouste – licence built Turbomeca Artouste
- Blackburn Turbomeca Palouste – Turbomeca Palouste
- Blackburn Turbomeca Palas – Turbomeca Palas
- Blackburn Turbomeca Turmo – Turbomeca Turmo
- Blackburn A.129

=== Blackburne ===
- Blackburne Tomtit
- Blackburne Thrush

=== Bliss ===
(E.W. Bliss Company)

- Bliss Jupiter
- Bliss Neptune
- Bliss Titan

=== Bloch ===
- Bloch 4B-1
- Bloch 6B-1

=== BMW ===
Source: Gunston except where noted

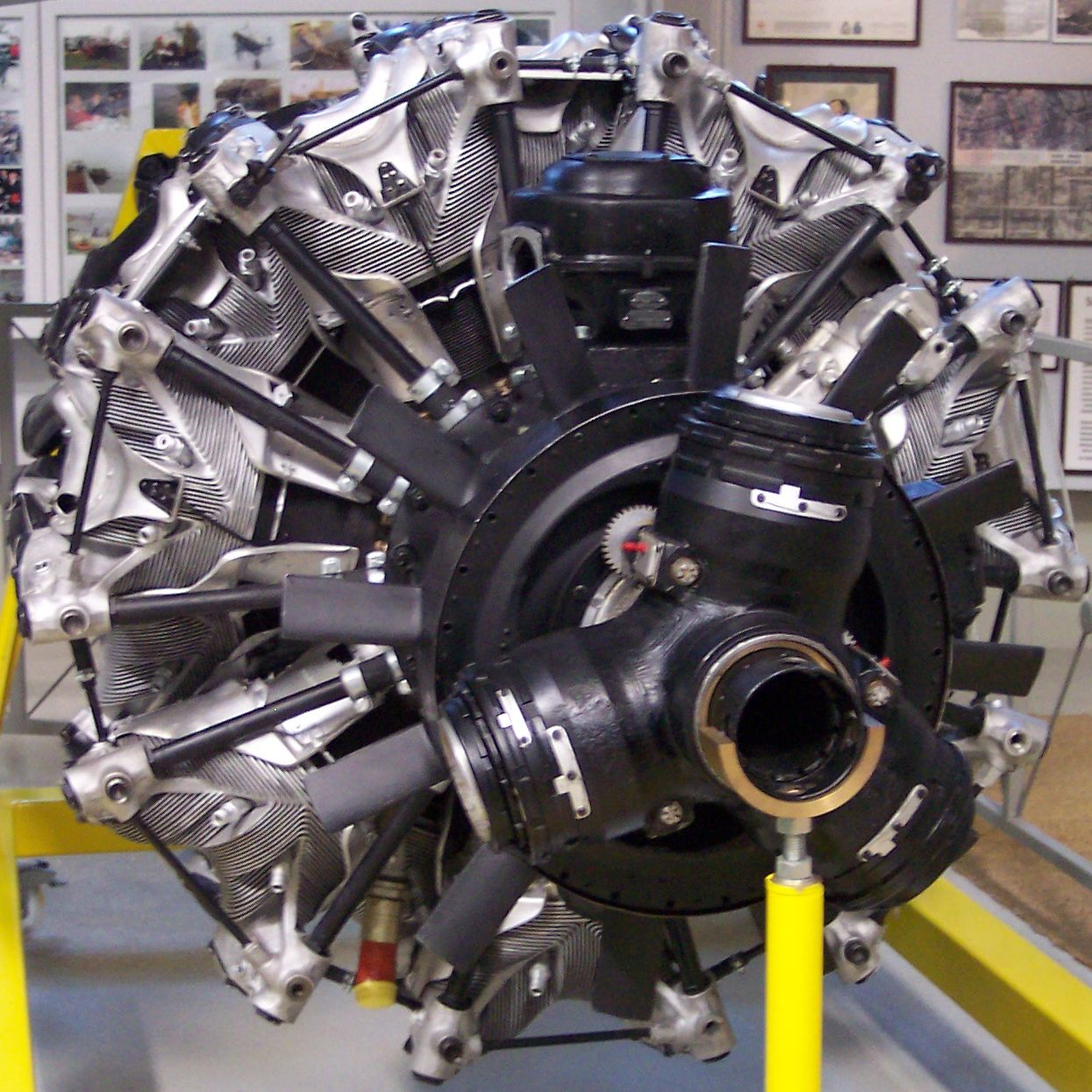
BMW 801

- BMW Sytlphe 5-cyl rotary 110 mm × 130 mm (4.3 in × 5.1 in)
- BMW III
- BMW IIIa
- BMW IV
- BMW V
- BMW Va
- BMW VI
- BMW VIIa
- BMW VIII
- BMW IX
- BMW X
- BMW XI
- BMW 003 axial-flow turbojet
- BMW 112 12-cylinder, (prototype)
- BMW 114
- BMW 116
- BMW 117
- BMW 132
- BMW 139
- BMW 801
- BMW 802
- BMW 803
- BMW 804
- BMW 805
- BMW 109-002 (Bramo 109-002)
- BMW 109-003
- BMW 109-018
- BMW 109-028
- BMW 109-510
- BMW 109-511
- BMW 109-528
- BMW 109-548
- BMW 109-558
- BMW 109-708
- BMW 109-718
- BMW P-3306
- BMW P-3307
- BMW MTU 6011
- BMW 6002
- BMW 6011
- BMW 6012 (MTU 6012)
- BMW 8025
- BMW 8026
- BMW GO-480-B1A6, license-built version of the Lycoming GO-480
- BMW-Lanova 114 V-4 9-cyl. radial diesel engine
- BMW M2 B15 – 2 cyl. air-cooled boxer

=== Boeing ===
Source:Pelletier except where noted

- Boeing T50
- Boeing T60
- Boeing 500
- Boeing 502
- Boeing 514
- Boeing 520
- Boeing 540 gas turbine engine (turboprop)
- Boeing 550
- Boeing 551 gas turbine engine (turboprop)
- Boeing 553 gas turbine engine (turboprop)

=== Boitel ===
- Boitel soleil

=== Boland ===
- Boland V-8

=== Bonner ===
(Aero Bonner Ltd.)

- Bonner Super Sapphire

=== Borzecki ===
(Jozef Borzecki)

- Borzecki 2RB
- Borzecki JB 2X250

=== Botali ===
- Botali Diesel – eight-cylinder air-cooled 118 hp

=== Bramo ===
Source:Gunston except where noted

- Bramo Sh.14A
- Bramo 301
- Bramo 314
- Bramo 322
- Bramo 323 Fafnir
- Bramo 325
- Bramo 328
- Bramo 329 Twin Fafnir
- Bramo 109-002
- Bramo 109-003

=== Brandner ===
- Brandner E-300

=== Breda ===
- Breda 320 hp V-8

=== Breguet-Bugatti ===
- Breguet-Bugatti U.16
- Breguet-Bugatti U.24
- Breguet-Bugatti U.24bis
- Breguet-Bugatti Quadrimotor Type A
- Breguet-Bugatti Quadrimotor Type B
- Breguet-Bugatti H-32B

=== Breitfeld & Danek ===
- Breitfeld & Danek Perun I 6-cylinder 170 hp
- Breitfeld & Danek Perun II 6-cylinder 276 hp
- Breitfeld & Danek BD-500 500 hp
- Breitfeld & Daněk Hiero IV
- Breitfeld & Daněk Hiero L
- Breitfeld & Daněk Hiero N

=== Breese ===
- Breese 40 hp 3-cyl radial

=== Breuer ===
(Breuer Werke G.m.b.H.)

- Breuer 9-091
- Breuer 9-094

=== Brewer ===
(Captain R.W.A. Brewer)

- Brewer Type M Gryphon O-8
- Brewer 250 hp O-12
- Brewer 500 hp X-16

=== Briggs & Stratton ===
- Briggs & Stratton Vanguard Big Block V-Twin

=== Bristol Engine Company (Bristol) ===
Division of Bristol Aeroplane Company formed when Cosmos Engineering was taken over in 1920. Became Bristol Aero Engines in 1956. Merged with Armstrong Siddeley in 1958 to form Bristol Siddeley. Sources: Piston engines, Lumsden, gas turbine and rocket engines, Gunston.

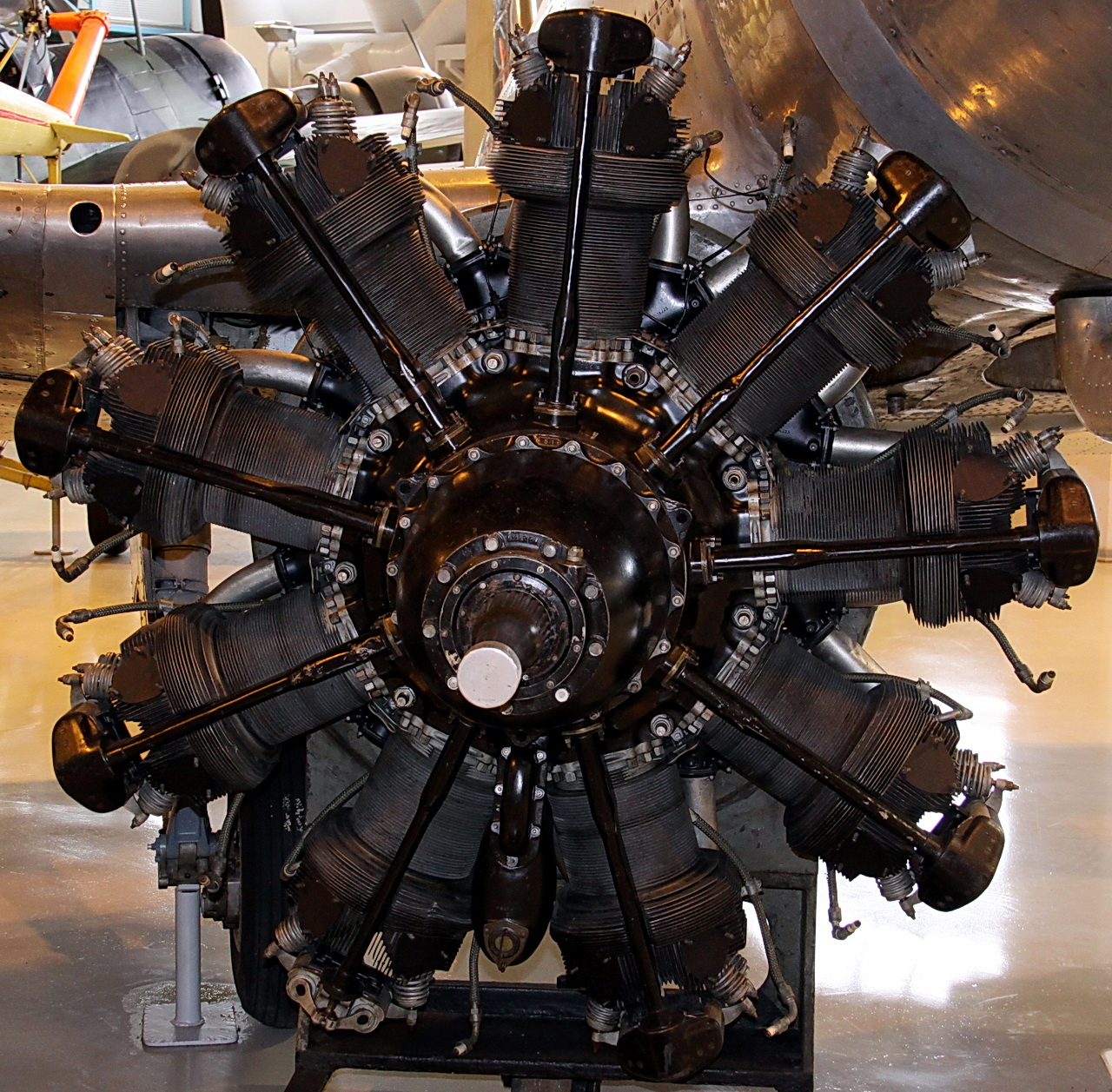
Bristol Pegasus radial

- Bristol Aquila
- Bristol Centaurus
- Bristol Coupled Centaurus
- Bristol Cherub
- Bristol Draco – fuel injected Pegasus radial
- Bristol Hercules
- Bristol Hydra
- Bristol Jupiter – originally Cosmos Jupiter
- Bristol Lucifer
- Bristol Mercury
- Bristol Neptune
- Bristol Olympus
- Bristol Orion – Jupiter variant
- Bristol Orion sleeve-valve
- Bristol Orion (BE.25) turbo-prop/shaft
- Bristol Orpheus
- Bristol Pegasus (radial engine)
- Bristol BE53 Pegasus (later, BS53 the Harrier engine)
- Bristol Perseus
- Bristol Phoebus
- Bristol Phoenix diesel radial
- Bristol Proteus – turboprop
- Bristol Taurus
- Bristol Theseus – turboprop
- Bristol Thor – ramjet
- Bristol Titan – 5-cylinder radial

==== Ramjets ====
- Bristol BE.25
- Bristol BRJ.1 6in ramjet, Initial development model using Boeing combustor.
- Bristol BRJ.2 16in ramjet. Scaled up BRJ1 with Boeing combustor.
- Bristol BRJ.2/5 16in M2 ramjet. Used on early Red Duster. Known to the MoS as BT.1 Thor
- Bristol BRJ.3 16in M2 ramjet. Fitted with NGTE combustor and used on XRD. Rated at 100,000 lbf (440 kN) at M3, Ø = 16 in (41 cm)
- Bristol BRJ.4/1 16in M2 ramjet. Used on early Red Duster and Bloodhound I. Known to the MoS as BT.2 Thor
- Bristol BRJ.5/1 16in M2 ramjet. Used on Bloodhound II. Became BT.3 Thor
- Bristol BRJ.601 16in M3 ramjet. Tested on Bobbin.
- Bristol BRJ.701 23in M3 ramjet project study.
- Bristol BRJ.801
- Bristol BRJ.801 18in M3 ramjet. Initial M3 ramjet developed for Stage 1 3/4 Blue Envoy.
- Bristol BRJ.811 18in M3 ramjet. M3 ramjet developed for Stage 1 3/4 Blue Envoy.
- Bristol BRJ.824 18in M3 ramjet. Cancelled with Blue Steel Mk2.

=== Bristol Siddeley ===
Bristol Siddeley was formed by Bristol taking over Armstrong Siddeley, rebranding several of the engines. It took over de Havilland engines and, in turn, became a division of Rolls-Royce Limited.

- Bristol Siddeley BE.58
- Bristol Siddeley Pegasus (BE.53
- Bristol Siddeley BS.59
- Bristol Siddeley BS.100
- Bristol Siddeley BS.143
- Bristol Siddeley BS.347
- Bristol Siddeley BS.358
- Bristol Siddeley BS.360 -ex de Havilland, finalised as Rolls-Royce Gem
- Bristol Siddeley BS.605
- Bristol Siddeley BS.1001 Bristol Siddeley M2.4 – 4.2 ramjet.
- Bristol Siddeley BS.1002 Bristol Siddeley M4.5 ramjet.
- Bristol Siddeley BS.1003 Odin Bristol Siddeley M3.5 ramjet, Odin.
- Bristol Siddeley BS.1004 Bristol Siddeley M2.3 ramjet.
- Bristol Siddeley BS.1005
- Bristol Siddeley BS.1006 Bristol Siddeley M4 research ramjet. Became R.2 research engine.
- Bristol Siddeley BS.1007
- Bristol Siddeley BS.1008 Bristol Siddeley M1.2 ramjet.
- Bristol Siddeley BS.1009 Bristol Siddeley M3 ramjet. Modified BT.3 Thor intended for proposed Bloodhound III. Modified nozzle, intake and diffuser.
- Bristol Siddeley BS.1010
- Bristol Siddeley BS.1011 Rated at 40000 lb (177.9KN).
- Bristol Siddeley BS.1012 Bristol Siddeley combination powerplant for APD 1019 and P.42. Used Olympus or BS.100 turbomachinery, bypass duct burning and ramjets.
- Bristol Siddeley BS.1013 Bristol Siddeley ramjet study for stand-off missile. Possibly for Pandora.
- Bristol Siddeley/SNECMA M45G
- Bristol Siddeley/SNECMA M45H
- Bristol Siddeley Gamma (for Black Knight)
- Bristol Siddeley Gnome – ex de Havilland
- Bristol Siddeley Gyron Junior ex de Havilland
- Bristol Siddeley Stentor – Ex Armstrong-Siddeley
- Bristol Siddeley Double Spectre two stacked de Havilland Spectres
- Bristol Siddeley PR.23
- Bristol Siddeley PR.37
- Bristol Siddeley Artouste – licence-built Turbomeca Artouste
- Bristol Siddeley Cumulus
- Bristol Siddeley Nimbus
- Bristol Siddeley Orpheus
- Bristol Siddeley Palouste – licence-built Turbomeca Palouste
- Bristol Siddeley Sapphire – ex Armstrong Siddeley
- Bristol Siddeley Spartan I
- Bristol Siddeley T64 (T64-BS-6)
- Bristol Siddeley Viper
- Bristol Siddeley BSRJ.801
- Bristol Siddeley BSRJ.824
- Bristol Siddeley NRJ.1
- Bristol Siddeley R.1 Bristol Siddeley research ramjet.
- Bristol Siddeley R.2 Bristol Siddeley research ramjet.

=== British Anzani ===
For French Anzani engines see: Anzani

- British Anzani 35 hp 2-cyl.
- British Anzani 45 hp 6-cyl.
- British Anzani 60 hp 6-cyl.
- British Anzani 100hp 10-cyl.

=== British Salmson ===
- British Salmson AD.3
- British Salmson AC.7
- British Salmson AC.9
- British Salmson AD.9
- British Salmson AD.9R srs III
- British Salmson AD.9NG

=== British Rotary ===
- British Rotary 100 hp 10-cyl. rotary

=== Brooke ===
(Brooke, Chicago)

- Brooke 85 hp 10-cyl. rotary
- Brooke 24 hp 6-cyl. rotary
- Brooke Multi-X

=== Brott ===
(A. Brott, Denver, Colorado)

- Brott 35 hp V-4 air-cooled
- Brott 45 hp V-4 water-cooled
- Brott 60 hp V-8 air-cooled

=== Brouhot ===
- Brouhot 60 hp V-8

=== Brownback ===
(Brownback Motor Laboratories Inc.)

- Brownback C-400 (Tiger 100)

=== Bucherer ===
- Bucherer 2-cyl rotary

=== Buchet ===
- Buchet 6 in-line
- Buchet 8-12 hp 3-cyl inline
- Buchet 24 hp 6-cyl radial 80 mm × 80 mm (3.15 in × 3.15 in)

=== Bücker ===
- Bücker M 700

=== Budworth ===
(David Budworth Limited)

- Budworth Puffin
- Budworth Brill
- Budworth Buzzard

=== Bugatti ===
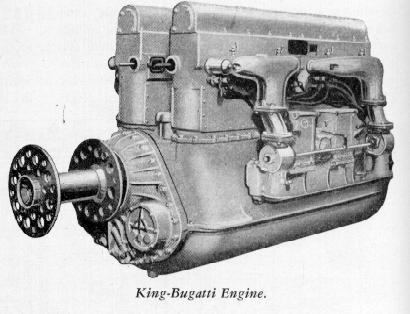
King Bugatti U-16

- Bugatti 8
- Bugatti U-16
- Bugatti Type 14
- Bugatti Type 34 U-16
- Bugatti Type 50B
- Bugatti Type 60

=== Burgess-White ===
(W. Starling Burgess, Rollin H. White / Burgess Company of Marblehead, MA and White Company of Cleveland, OH)

- Burgess-White X-16

=== Burlat ===
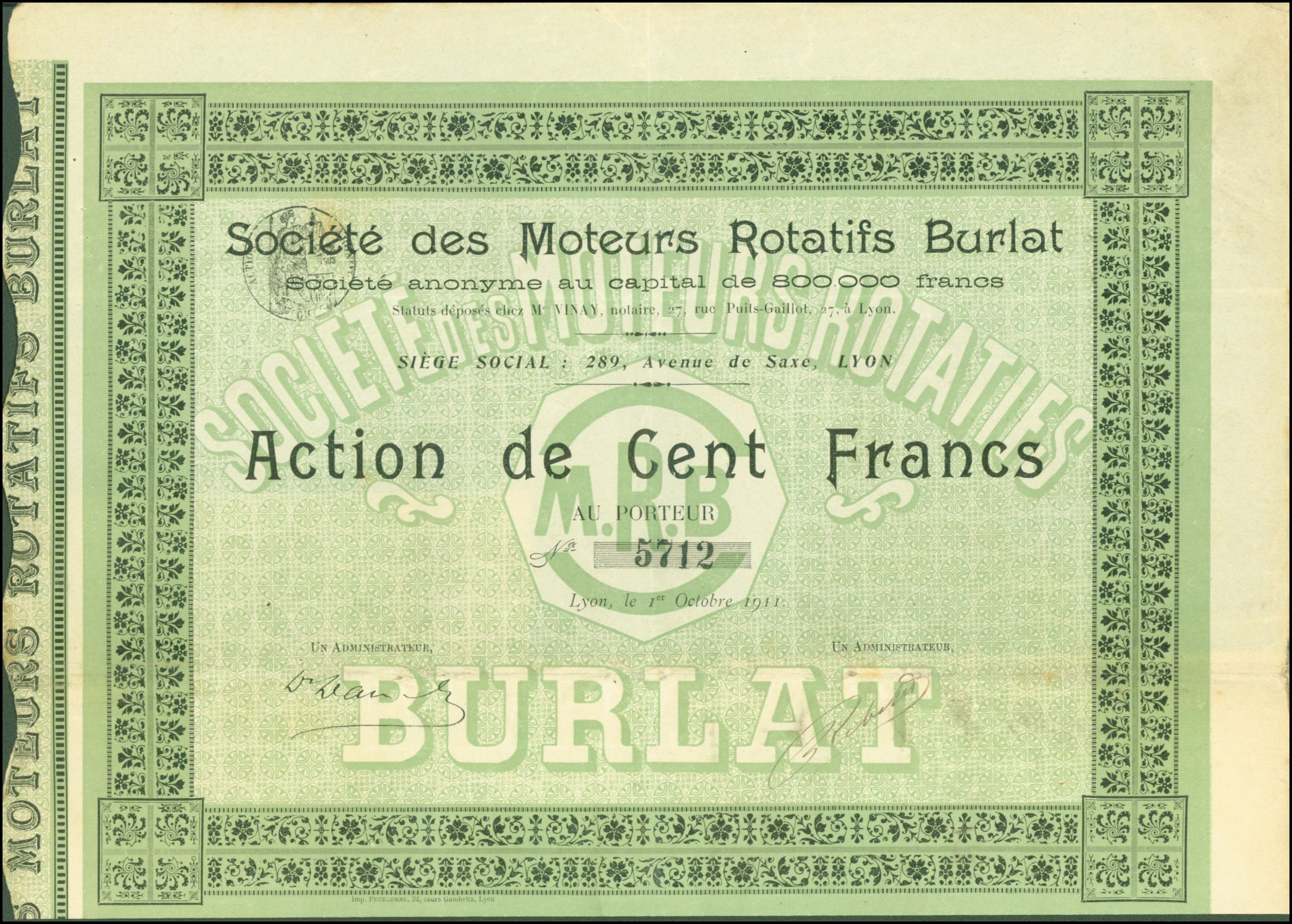
Share of the Société des Moteurs Rotatifs Burlat, issued 1. November 1911

(Société des Moteurs Rotatifs Burlat)

- Burlat 8cyl. 35 hp rotary – 26 kW (35 hp) at 1800 rpm, 95 mm × 120 mm (3.74 in × 4.72 in). 85 kg (187 lb). 6 500F
- Burlat 8cyl. 60 hp rotary – 45 kW (60 hp) at 1800 rpm, 120 mm × 120 mm (4.72 in × 4.72 in), 120 kg (264 lb), 11000F
- Burla 8cyl. 75 hp rotary – 56 kW (75 hp) at 1800 rpm, 120 mm × 170 mm (4.72 in × 6.69 in), 140 kg (308 lb), 11000F
- Burlat 16cyl. 120 hp rotary – 89 kW (120 hp)p at 1750 rpm, 120 mm × 120 mm (4.72 in × 4.72 in), 225 kg (495 lb), 22000 F

=== Burnelli ===
- Burnelli AR-3

=== Burt ===
(Peter Burt)

- Burt 180 hp V-12

== C ==
=== CAC ===
- CAC R-975 Cicada
- CAC R-1340
- CAC R-1830
- CAC Merlin

=== CAE ===
See:Teledyne CAE

=== Caffort ===
(Anciens Etablissements Caffort Frères)

- Caffort 12Aa

=== Cal-Aero ===
(Cal-aero Institute, California)

- Cal-Aero Project

=== Call ===
(Henry L. Call)

- Call E-1 2OW
- Call E-2 4OW

=== CAM ===
(Canadian Airmotive Inc.)

- CAM TURBO 90

=== Canton-Unné ===
- Canton-Unné X-9

=== Cameron ===
(Cameron Aero Engine Division / Everett S. Cameron)

- Cameron C4-I-E1
- Cameron C6
- Cameron C12

=== Campini ===
Source:Gunston

- Secondo Campini thermojet

=== CANSA ===
(Fabbrica Italiana Automobili Torino – Costruzioni Aeronautiche Novaresi S.A.)

- CANSA C.80

=== Carden Aero Engines ===
Source:Ord-Hume.

- Carden-Ford 31hp 4-cyl.
- Carden-Ford S.P.1

=== CAREC ===
(China National Aero-Engine Corporation)

- CAREC WP-11

=== Casanova ===
(Ramon Casanova)

- Casanova pulse-jet

=== Cato ===
- Cato 35 hp 2-cyl 2OA
- Cato 60 hp 4-cyl 4IL
- Cato C-2 75 hp 2OA

=== Caunter ===
- Caunter B
- Caunter C
- Caunter D

=== Centrum ===
- Centrum 150 hp 6-cyl radial

=== Ceskoslovenska Zbrojovka ===
Data from:

- Ceskoslovenska Zbrojovka ZOD 260-B 2-stroke radial diesel engine – 260 hp

=== CFM International ===
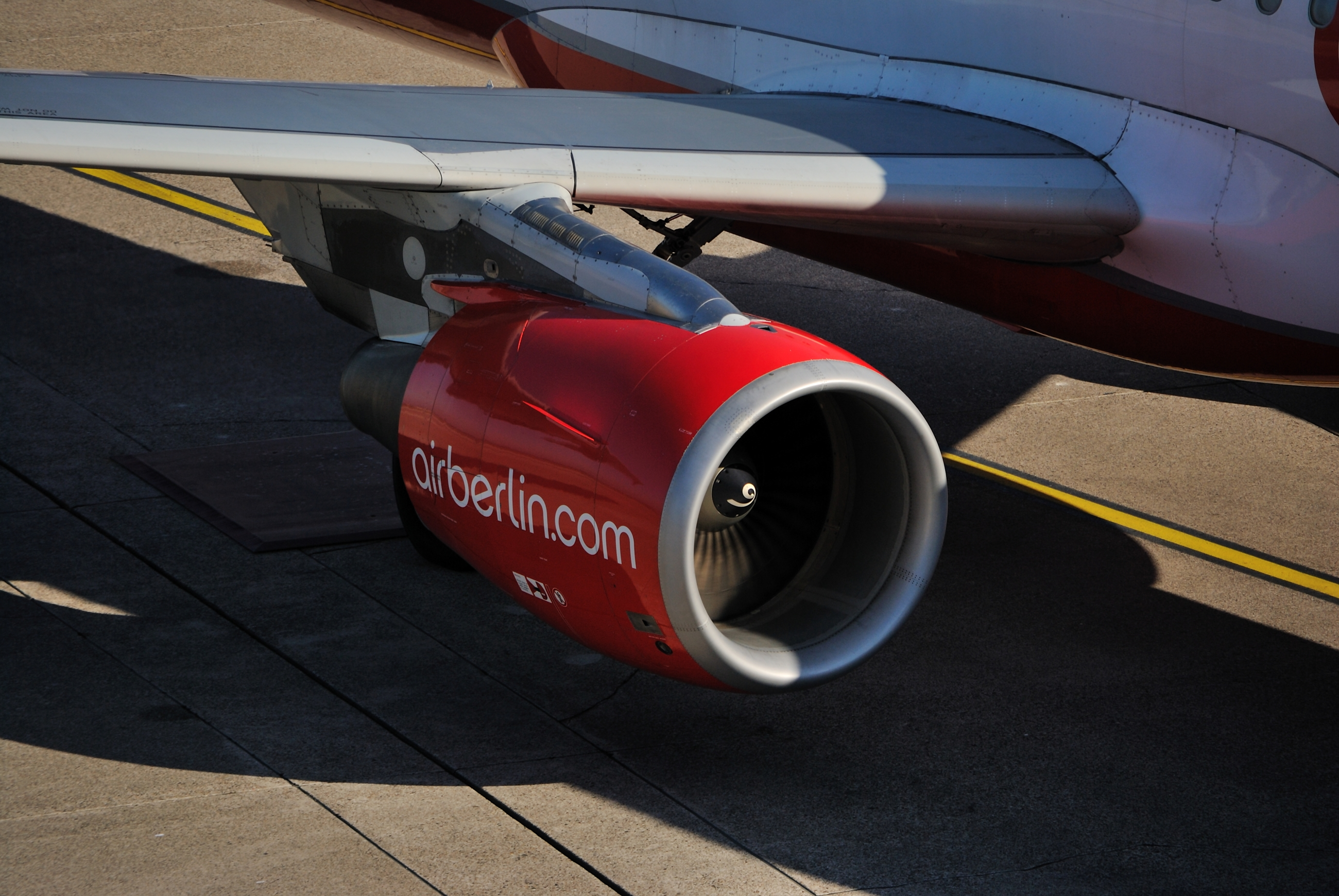
CFM56-5B series engine installed on Airberlin Airbus A320 family

- CFM International CFM56
- CFM International LEAP
- CFM International RISE

=== Chaise ===
(Societe Anonyme Omnium Metallurgique et Industriel / Etablissements Chaise et Cie)

- Chaise 12 hp V-2
- Chaise 30 hp V-4
- Chaise 4A 101 hp
- Chaise 4B 120 hp (14° inverted V-4)
- Chaise 4Ba
- Chaise AV.2

=== Chamoy ===
(M. Fernand Chamoy)

- Chamoy 5-cyl radial

=== Chamberlin ===
- Chamberlin L-236
- Chamberlin L-267

=== Changzhou ===
(Changzhou Lan Xiang Machinery Works)

- Changzhou WZ-6

=== Charomskiy ===
Source:Gunston

- Charomskiy AN.1
- Charomskiy ACh-30
- Charomskiy ACh-31
- Charomskiy ACh-32
- Charomskiy ACh-39
- Charomskiy M-40

=== Chelomey ===
- Chelomey D-3 Pulse-jet
- Chelomey D-5 Pulse-jet
- Chelomey D-6 Pulse-jet
- Chelomey D-7 Pulse-jet

=== Chenu ===
- Chenu 50-65 hp 4-cyl DD 110 mm × 190 mm (4.3 in × 7.5 in)
- Chenu 75 hp 6-cyl in-line 110 mm × 190 mm (4.3 in × 7.5 in)
- Chenu 90 hp 4-cyl GD 120 mm × 130 mm (4.7 in × 5.1 in)
- Chenu 80-90 hp 6-cyl DD
- Chenu 80-90 hp 6-cyl GD
- Chenu 200-250 hp 6-cyl DD 150 mm × 120 mm (5.9 in × 4.7 in) (for dirigibles)

=== Chengdu ===
- Chengdu WS-18

=== Chevrolair ===
(The Arthur Chevrolet Aviation Motors Corporation)

- Chevrolair 1923 Water-cooled in-line 4 upright
- Chevrolair D-4
- Chevrolair D-6
- Chevrolair 1923 Air-cooled in-line 4 upright and inverted

=== Chevrolet ===
- Chevrolet Turbo-Air 6 engine

=== Chotia ===
- Chotia 460

=== Christoffersen ===
(Christoffersen Aircraft Company)

- Christoffersen 120 hp 6-cyl in-line
- Christoffersen 120 hp V-12

=== Chrysler ===
- Chrysler IV-2220
- Chrysler T36D

=== Church ===
(Jim Church)

- Church V-8
- Church J-3 Marathon
- Church V-248 V-8

=== Cicaré ===
- Cicaré 4C2T

=== Cirrus ===
- Cirrus I
- Cirrus II
- Cirrus III
- Cirrus Hermes
- Cirrus Major
- Cirrus Minor

=== Cisco Motors ===
- Cisco Snap 100

=== Citroën ===
- Citroen 2cyl Citroën 2CV – 18 hp
- Citroen 4cyl Citroën GS 1.2 – 65 hp at 5,700 rpm

=== Clapp's Cars ===
- Clapp's Cars Spyder Standard

=== Clément-Bayard ===
Data from:

- Clément-Bayard 30 hp 2-cyl HOW 130.2 mm × 111.1 mm (5.125 in × 4.375 in)
- Clément-Bayard 29 hp 4-cyl in-line 100 mm × 120 mm (3.94 in × 4.72 in)
- Clément-Bayard 40 hp 4-cyl in-line 100 mm × 120 mm (3.94 in × 4.72 in)
- Clément-Bayard 100 hp 4-cyl in-line 135 mm × 160 mm (5.3 in × 6.3 in)
- Clément-Bayard 118.5 hp 4-cyl in-line 190 mm × 230 mm (7.48 in × 9.06 in)
- Clément-Bayard 117.5 hp 6-cyl in-line 155 mm × 185 mm (6.1 in × 7.28 in)
- Clément-Bayard 250 hp 6-cyl in-line 155 mm × 200 mm (6.1 in × 7.87 in) (for dirigibles)
- Clément-Bayard 50 hp 7-cyl Radial 100 mm × 115 mm (3.94 in × 4.53 in)
- Clément-Bayard 300 hp 8-cyl in-line 165 mm × 225 mm (6.5 in × 8.86 in) (for airships)
- Clément-Bayard V-16 (for airships)

=== Cleone ===
- Cleone 1930 25 hp 2-cyl hor opp 2 stroke

=== Clerget ===
Source: Hartmann

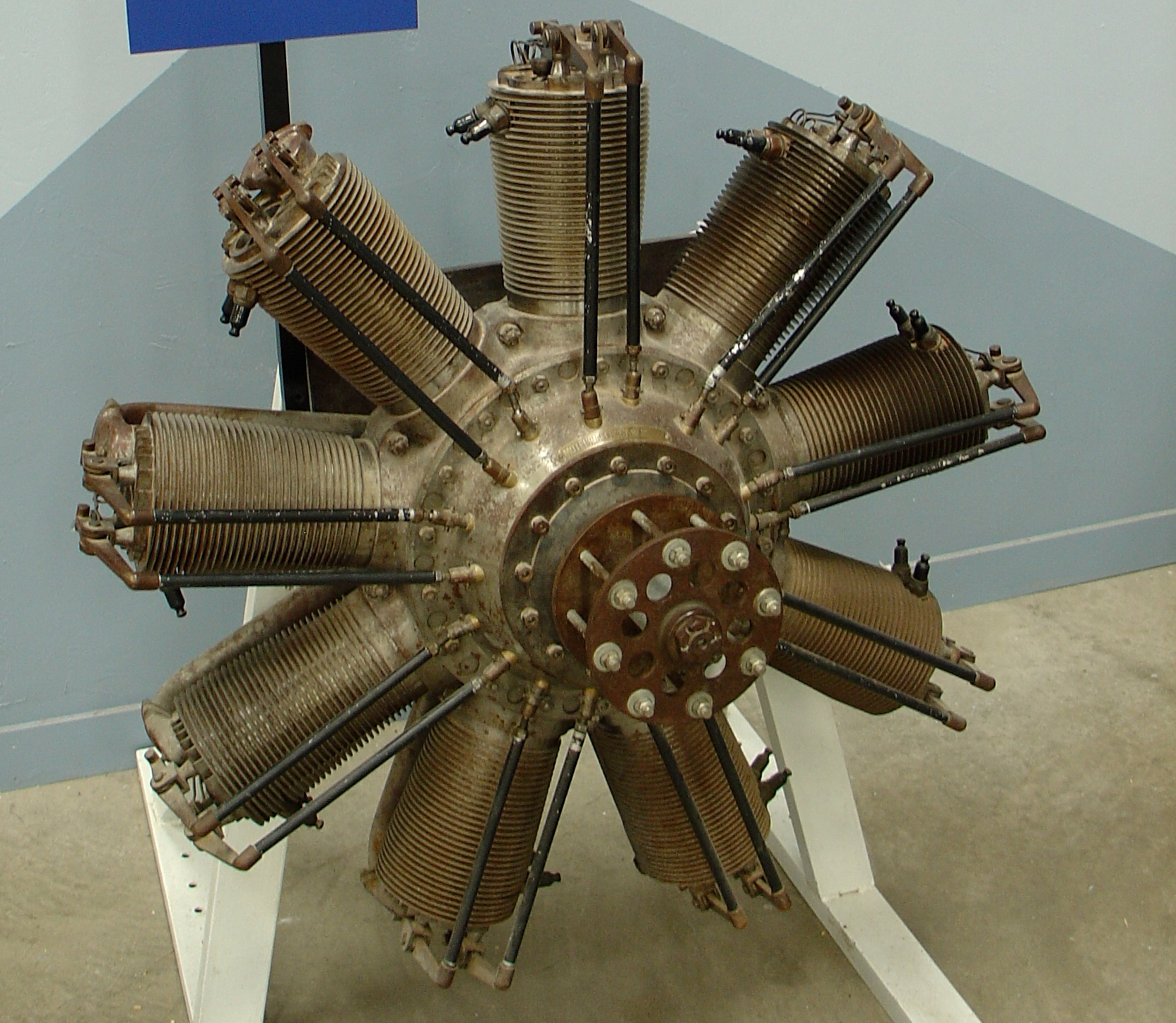
Clerget 9B on display at the Pima Air & Space Museum

- Clément-Bayard (1908-1911)
  - Clerget 50 hp (4V) water-cooled inline-four
  - Clerget 100 hp (4W) (water-cooled inline-four
  - Clerget 200 hp water-cooled V8
- Malicet et Blin (1911-1912)
  - Clerget 7Y - 60 hp (45 kW) rotary
- Clerget-Blin (1913-1919)
  - Clerget 7Z - 80 hp (60 kW) rotary
  - Clerget 9A - 110 hp (82 kW) rotary
  - Clerget 9B - 130 hp (97 kW) rotary
  - Clerget 9Bf - 140 hp (100 kW) rotary
  - Clerget 9Z - 110 hp (82 kW) rotary
  - Clerget 11Eb - 200 hp (150 kW) rotary
  - Clerget 9J - 110 hp (82 kW) rotary
  - Clerget 2K - 15 hp (11 kW) flat-twin
    - Clerget 2L - variant with upgraded cylinder head
  - Clerget 16X - 400 hp (300 kW) X engine
- Service Technique de l'Aéronautique (1920-1943)
  - Clerget 9A - 100 hp (75 kW) diesel radial
  - Clerget 9B - 200 hp (150 kW) diesel radial
  - Clerget 9C - 300 hp (220 kW) diesel radial. Entered production as the Hispano-Suiza 9T.
  - Clerget 14D - 300 hp (220 kW) diesel radial
  - Clerget 14E - 400 hp (300 kW) diesel radial
  - Clerget 14F - 520 hp (390 kW) diesel radial
  - Clerget 16H (type transatlantique) - 1,600 hp (1,200 kW) diesel V16

=== Cleveland ===
(Walter C. Willard / Cleveland Aero Engines)

- Cleveland 150 hp 6-cyl axial engine 6x130 mm × 150 mm (5 in × 6 in)

=== Cleveland ===
(Cleveland Engineering Laboratories Company)

- Cleveland Weger 400 hp 6-cyl 2-stroke radial 4.25 in × 5 in (108 mm × 127 mm)

=== C.L.M. ===
(Compagnie Lilloise de Moteurs S.A)

- Lille 6As 6-cyl opposed piston 2-stroke diesel (Junkers Jumo 205 licence built)
- Lille 6Brs (600 hp)

=== CMB ===
(Construction Mécanique du Béarn) See: Béarn

=== CNA ===
- CNA C.II
- CNA C.VI I.R.C.43
- CNA C.7
- CNA D.4
- CNA D.VIII

=== Coatalen ===
Source:Brew

- Coatalen 12Vrs-2 diesel

=== Colombo ===
- Colombo C.160
- Colombo D.110
- Colombo E.150
- Colombo S.53
- Colombo S.63

=== Combi ===
- Combi 150 hp 6-cyl

=== Comet ===
(Comet Engine Corp, Madison WI.)

- Comet 130hp
- Comet 5
- Comet 7-D 1928 (ATC 9) = 150 hp 612ci 7RA.
- Comet 7-E 1929 (ATC 47) = 165 hp 612ci 7RA.
- Comet 7-RA 1928 (ATC 9) = 130 hp 7RA.

=== Compagnie Lilloise de Moteurs ===
See:C.L.M.

=== Conrad ===
(Deutsche Motorenbau G.m.b.H. / Robert Conrad)

- Conrad C.III – (licence built by N.A.G. as the C.III N.A.G.)

=== Continental ===
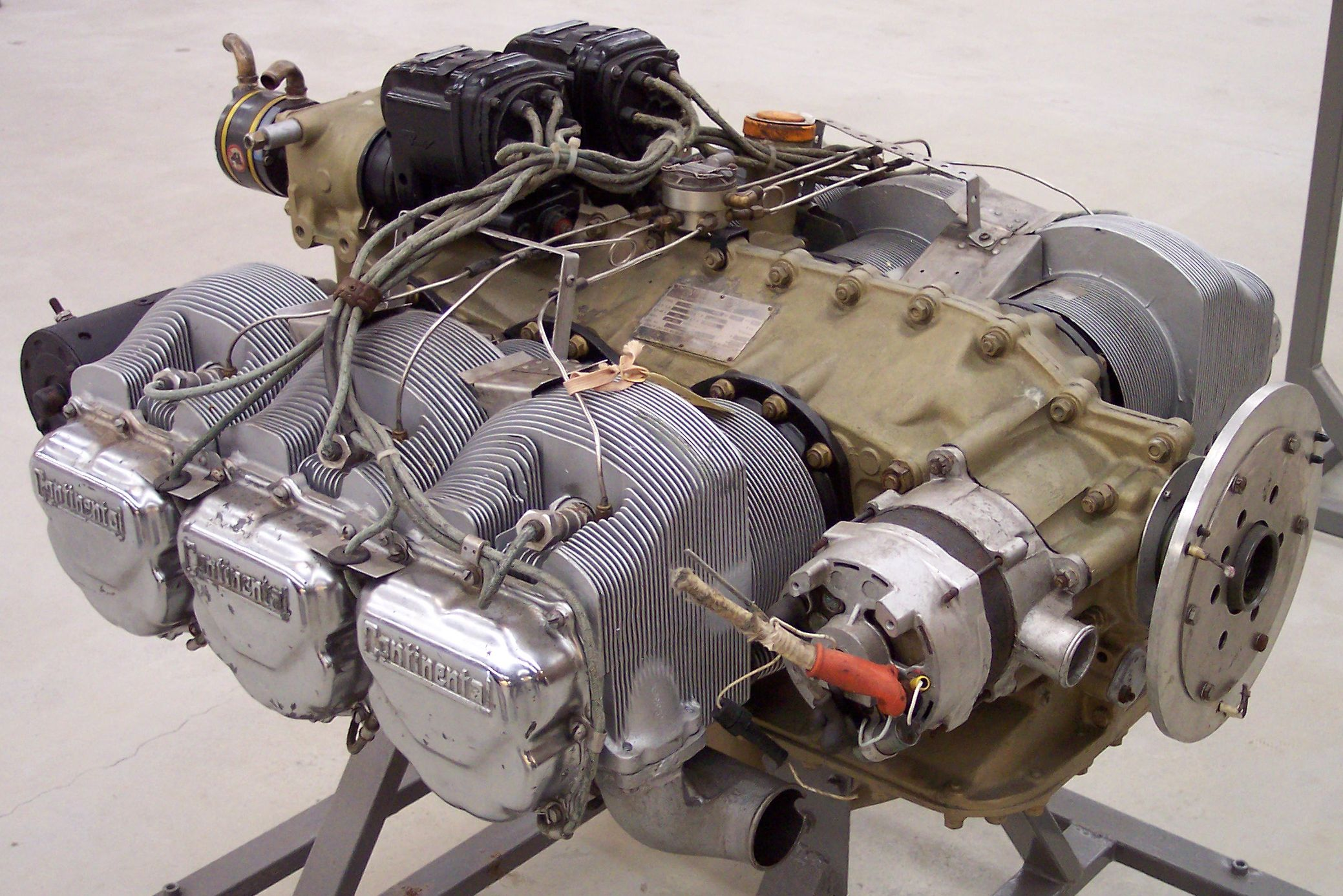
Continental IO-520

- Continental 140
- Continental 141
- Continental 142
- Continental 160
- Continental 210
- Continental 217
- Continental 219
- Continental 220
- Continental 227
- Continental 320
- Continental 324
- Continental TS-325
- Continental 327
- Continental 352
- Continental 354
- Continental 356
- Continental 420
- Continental 500
- Continental TP-500
- Continental A40
- Continental A50
- Continental A65
- Continental A70
- Continental A75
- Continental A80
- Continental A90
- Continental A100
- Continental C75
- Continental C85
- Continental C90
- Continental C115
- Continental C125
- Continental C140
- Continental C145
- Continental C175
- Continental CD175 Thielert Centurion diesel engines 2010s
- Continental CD300 Thielert Centurion diesel engines 2010s
- Continental E165
- Continental E185
- Continental E225
- Continental E260
- Continental GR9-A
- Continental GR18
- Continental GR36
- Continental Tiara 4-180
- Continental Tiara 6-260
- Continental Tiara 6-285
- Continental Tiara 6-320
- Continental Tiara 8-380
- Continental Tiara 8-450
- Continental Voyager 200
- Continental Voyager 300
- Continental Voyager 370
- Continental Voyager 550
- Continental O-110
- Continental O-170
- Continental O-190
- Continental O-200
- Continental O-240
- Continental O-255
- Continental O-270 (Tiara)
- Continental O-280
- Continental O-300
- Continental O-315
- Continental IO-346
- Continental O-360
- Continental O-368 (4cyl. O-550)
- Continental O-405 (Tiara)
- Continental O-470
- Continental O-520
- Continental O-526
- Continental O-540 (Tiara)
- Continental O-550
- Continental OL-200
- Continental OL-370
- Continental-Honda OL-370
- Continental OL-550
- Continental OL-1430
- Continental V-1650 (Merlin)
- Continental V-1430
- Continental IV-1430
- Continental I-1430
- Continental XH-2860
- Continental R-545
- Continental R-670
- Continental R-975
- Continental XR-1740-2
- Continental W670
- Continental TD-300
- Continental Model R-20
- Continental J69
- Continental J87
- Continental J100
- Continental RJ35 Ramjet
- Continental RJ45 Ramjet
- Continental RJ49 Ramjet
- Continental T51
- Continental T65
- Continental T67
- Continental T69
- Continental T72
- Continental Titan X340
- Continental Titan X320
- Continental Titan X370

=== Cors-Air ===
(Cors-Air srl, Barco di Bibbiano, Italy)

- Cors-Air M19 Black Magic
- Cors-Air M21Y
- Cors-Air M25Y Black Devil

=== Corvair ===
(conversions and derivatives of the Chevrolet Turbo-Air 6 engine)

- AeroMax Aviation AeroMax 100
- Clapp's Cars Spyder Standard
- Magsam/Wynne (Del Magsam / William Wynne)

=== Cosmos Engineering ===
- Cosmos Jupiter
- Cosmos Lucifer
- Cosmos Mercury
- Cosmos Hercules 1,000 hp – 18x 6.25 in × 7.5 in (159 mm × 191 mm)

=== Coventry Victor ===
- Coventry Victor Neptune

=== Crankless Engines Company ===
(Anthony Michell)

- Michell XB-4070

=== C.R.M.A. ===
(Société de construction et de Reparationde Materiel Aéronautique)

- C.R.M.A. Type 102

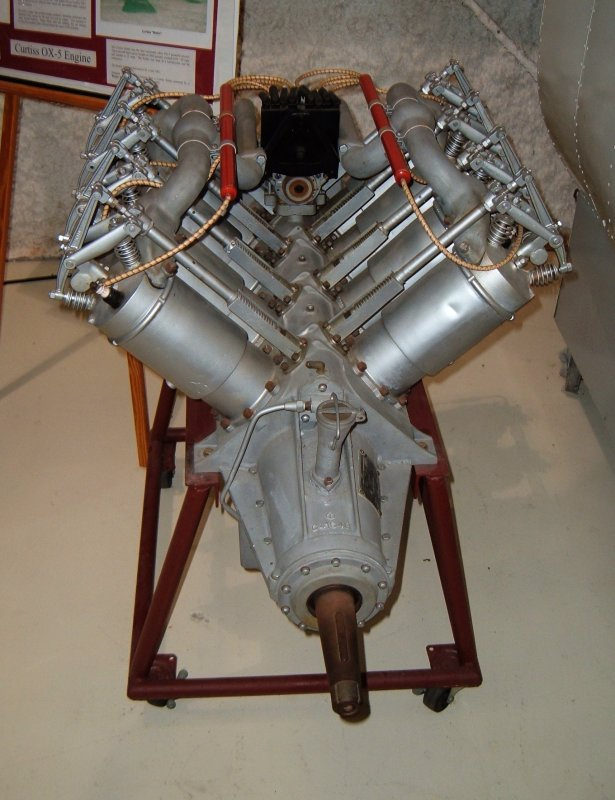
Curtiss OX-5 at the Lone Star Flight Museum

=== Curtiss ===
- Curtiss 250 hp V-12 1649 cu in AB?
- Curtiss 25-30 hp
- Curtiss A-2 (9 hp V-2)
- Curtiss A-4
- Curtiss A-8
- Curtiss B-4
- Curtiss AB
- Curtiss B-8
- Curtiss C-1
- Curtiss C-2
- Curtiss C-4
- Curtiss C-6
- Curtiss C-12
- Curtiss CD-12
- Curtiss Crusader
- Curtiss D-12
- Curtiss E-4
- Curtiss E-8 100 hp V-8
- Curtiss H
- Curtiss K
- Curtiss H-1640 Chieftain
- Curtiss K-6
- Curtiss K-12
- Curtiss S
- Curtiss L
- Curtiss O
- Curtiss OX-2
- Curtiss OX-5
- Curtiss OXX-2
- Curtiss OXX-3
- Curtiss OXX-5
- Curtiss OXX-6
- Curtiss R-600 Challenger
- Curtiss R-1454
- Curtiss V V-8
- Curtiss V-2 V-8
- Curtiss V-3 V-8-8
- Curtiss V-4 V-12
- Curtiss V-1400
- Curtiss V-1460
- Curtiss V-1550
- Curtiss V-1570 Conqueror
- Curtiss VX

=== Curtiss-Kirkham ===
- Curtiss-Kirkham K-12

=== Curtiss-Wright ===
- Curtiss-Wright LR25
- Curtiss-Wright RJ41 Ramjet
- Curtiss-Wright RJ47 Ramjet
- Curtiss-Wright RJ51 Ramjet
- Curtiss-Wright RJ55 Ramjet
- Curtiss-Wright RC2-60 Wankel engine
- Curtiss-Wright R-600 Challenger
- Curtiss-Wright TJ-32 (Olympus from Bristol, modified by CW)
- Curtiss-Wright TJ-38 Zephyr (Americanised Olympus 551)

=== Cuyuna ===
See:2si

== D ==
=== D-Motor ===
- D-Motor LF26
- D-Motor LF39

=== D'Hennian ===
- D'Hennian 10-12 hp rotary
- D'Hennian 50 hp 7-cyl rotary

=== Daiichi Kosho Company ===
- Daiichi Kosho DK 472

=== Daimler-Benz ===
Source:Gunston except where noted

- Daimler P 12 hp 1896 airship engine
- Daimler N 28 hp 1899 airship engine
- Daimler 1900 flugmotor
- Daimler 1910 4-cyl. 55 hp
- Daimler H4L 160 hp airship engine
- Daimler J4 210 hp airship engine
- Daimler J4L 230 hp airship engine
- Daimler J4F 360 hp airship engine
- Daimler J8L 480 hp airship engine
- Daimler-Benz 1926 2-cyl.
- Daimler-Benz F.2
- Daimler-Benz 750 hp V-12 diesel
- Mercedes-Benz LOF.6 airship diesel engine
- Daimler NL.1 – Zeppelin motor
- Daimler-Benz OF 2 4-stroke V-12 diesel
- Daimler-Benz DB 600
- Daimler-Benz DB 601
- Daimler-Benz DB 602 V-16 diesel
- Daimler-Benz DB 603
- Daimler-Benz DB 604 (X-24)
- Daimler-Benz DB 605
- Daimler-Benz DB 606 (Coupled DB 601)
- Daimler-Benz DB 607 (Diesel)
- Daimler-Benz DB 609 (IV-16)
- Daimler-Benz DB 610 (Coupled DB 605)
- Daimler-Benz DB 612
- Daimler-Benz DB 613 (Coupled DB 603G)
- Daimler-Benz DB 614
- Daimler-Benz DB 615 (Coupled DB 614)
- Daimler-Benz DB 616
- Daimler-Benz DB 617
- Daimler-Benz DB 618 (Coupled DB 617)
- Daimler-Benz DB 619 (Coupled DB 609)
- Daimler-Benz DB 620 (Coupled DB 628)
- Daimler-Benz DB 621
- Daimler-Benz DB 622
- Daimler-Benz DB 623
- Daimler-Benz DB 624
- Daimler-Benz DB 625
- Daimler-Benz DB 626
- Daimler-Benz DB 627
- Daimler-Benz DB 628
- Daimler-Benz DB 629
- Daimler-Benz DB 630 W-36(Coupled W-18)
- Daimler-Benz DB 631
- Daimler-Benz DB 632
- Daimler-Benz DB 670
- Daimler-Benz DB 720 (PTL 6)
- Daimler-Benz DB 721 (PTL 10)
- Daimler-Benz DB 730 (ZTL 6)
- Daimler-Benz 109-007 (Turbofan)
- Daimler-Benz 109-016 (Turbojet)
- Daimler-Benz 109-021 (Turbojet)
- Daimler-Benz PTL 6
- Daimler-Benz PTL 10
- Daimler-Benz ZTL 6
- Daimler-Benz ZTL 6000
- Daimler-Benz ZTL 6001
- Daimler-Benz ZTL 109-007
- Daimler F7502
- Daimler-Versuchmotor F7506
- Daimler D.IIIb – (not related to Mercedes D.III)
- Mercedes 50 hp 4-cyl in-line
- Mercedes 60 hp 4-cyl in-line 110 mm × 140 mm (4.3 in × 5.5 in)
- Mercedes 70 hp 4-cyl in-line inverted 120 mm × 140 mm (4.7 in × 5.5 in)
- Mercedes 80 hp 6-cyl in-line 105 mm × 140 mm (4.1 in × 5.5 in)
- Mercedes 90 hp 4-cyl in-line 140 mm × 150 mm (5.5 in × 5.9 in)
- Mercedes 120 hp 4-cyl in-line (airship engine) 175 mm × 165 mm (6.9 in × 6.5 in)
- Mercedes 160 hp 6-cyl in-line 140 mm × 160 mm (5.5 in × 6.3 in)
- Mercedes 180 hp 6-cyl in-line 160 mm × 180 mm (6.3 in × 7.1 in)
- Mercedes 240 hp 8-cyl in-line 140 mm × 160 mm (5.5 in × 6.3 in)
- Mercedes 240 hp V-8 (airship engine) 175 mm × 165 mm (6.9 in × 6.5 in)
- Mercedes 260hp 6-cyl in-line 160 mm × 180 mm (6.3 in × 7.1 in)
- Mercedes 650 hp V-12 235 mm × 250 mm (9.3 in × 9.8 in)
- Mercedes Typ E4F 70 hp 120 mm × 140 mm (4.7 in × 5.5 in)
- Mercedes Typ E6F 100 hp 120 mm × 140 mm (4.7 in × 5.5 in)
- Mercedes Typ J4L 120 hp 160 mm × 170 mm (6.3 in × 6.7 in)
- Mercedes Typ J8L 240 hp V-8 160 mm × 170 mm (6.3 in × 6.7 in)
- Mercedes W-18
- Mercedes Fh 1256
- Mercedes D.I
- Mercedes D.II
- Mercedes D.III
- Mercedes D.IIIa
- Mercedes D.IIIaü
- Mercedes D.IIIav
- Mercedes D.IV
- Mercedes D.IVa
- Mercedes D.VI

=== Damblanc-Mutti ===
- Damblanc-Mutti 165 hp
- Damblanc-Mutti 11-cyl. rotary 220 hp

=== Danek ===
(Ceskomorarsk-Kolben-Danek & Co.)

- Danek Praga 500 hp V-12

=== Daniel ===
(Daniel Engine Company)

- Daniel 7-cyl rotary

=== Dansette-Gillet ===
- Dansette-Gillet Type A 45 hp 4-cyl in-line 105 mm × 160 mm (4.1 in × 6.3 in)
- Dansette-Gillet Type C 32 hp 4-cyl in-line 98 mm × 125 mm (3.9 in × 4.9 in)
- Dansette-Gillet Type D 70 hp 4-cyl in-line 130 mm × 160 mm (5.1 in × 6.3 in)
- Dansette-Gillet 100 hp 6-cyl in-line 130 mm × 160 mm (5.1 in × 6.3 in)
- Dansette-Gillet 120 hp V-8 114 mm × 160 mm (4.5 in × 6.3 in)
- Dansette-Gillet 200 hp 6-cyl in-line 180 mm × 200 mm (7.1 in × 7.9 in)

=== Darracq ===
Data from:

- Darracq 25 hp O-2 130 mm × 120 mm (5.1 in × 4.7 in)
- Darracq 50 hp O-4 130 mm × 120 mm (5.1 in × 4.7 in)
- Darracq 43 hp 4-cyl in-line 120 mm × 140 mm (4.7 in × 5.5 in)
- Darracq 84 hp 4-cyl in-line 170 mm × 140 mm (6.7 in × 5.5 in)
- Darracq 12Da 420 hp V-12

=== Dassault ===
- Dassault MD.30 Viper
- Dassault R.7 Farandole

=== Day ===
(Charles Day)

- Day 25 hp 5-cyl

=== Dayton ===
(Dayton Airplane Engine Co.)

- Dayton Bear

=== de Dietrich ===
- de Dietrich 4-cyl in-line

=== De Dion-Bouton ===
- De Dion-Bouton 80 hp V-8 100 mm × 120 mm (3.9 in × 4.7 in)
- De Dion-Bouton 100 hp V-8 90 mm × 150 mm (3.5 in × 5.9 in)
- De Dion-Bouton 130 hp 12B V-12
- De Dion-Bouton 150 hp V-8 125 mm × 150 mm (4.9 in × 5.9 in)
- De Dion-Bouton 800 hp X-16 170 mm × 190 mm (6.7 in × 7.5 in)

=== de Havilland ===
Sources: Piston engines, Lumsden, gas turbine and rocket engines, Gunston.

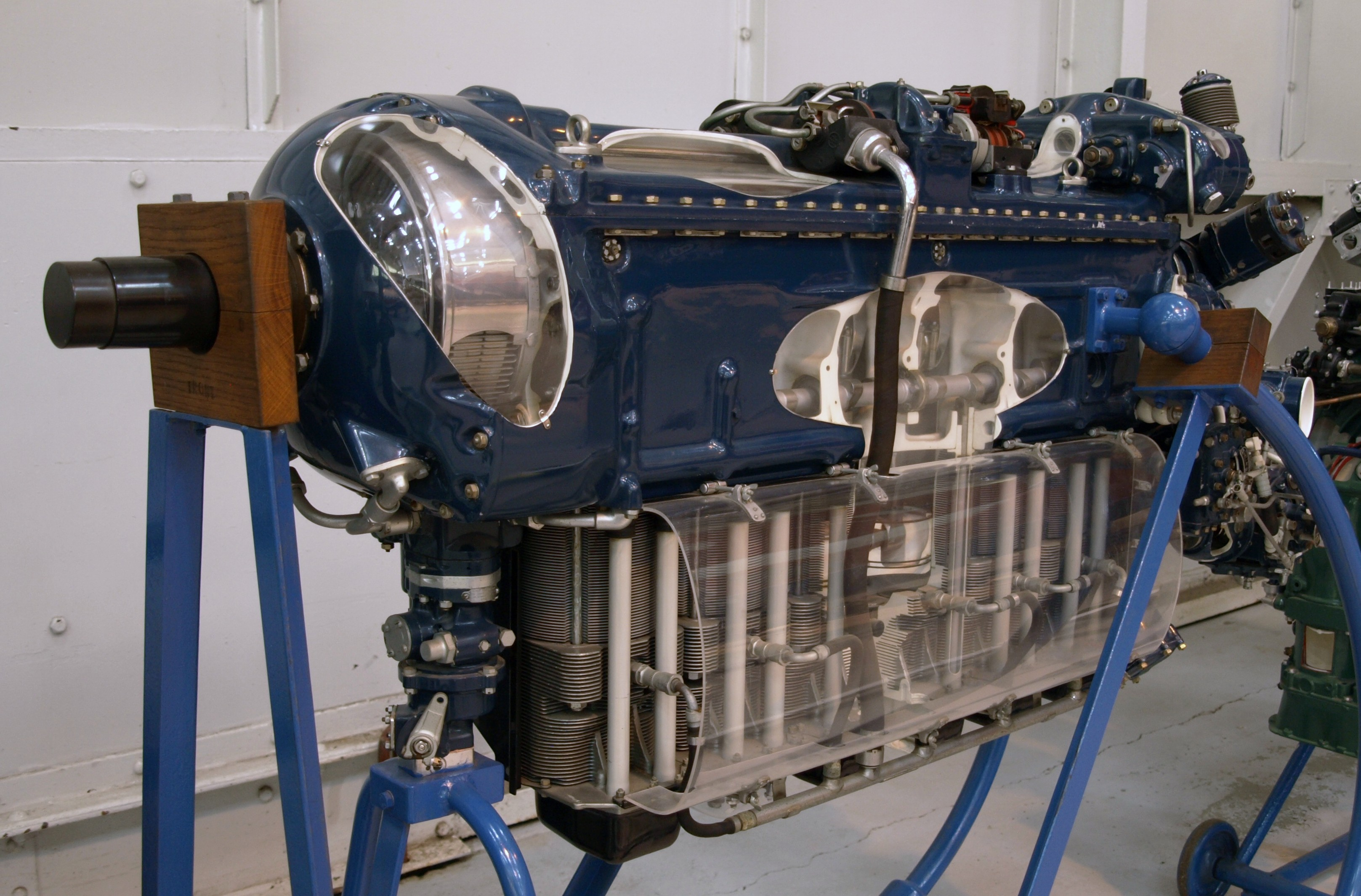
de Havilland Gipsy Queen on display at the Royal Air Force Museum Cosford

==== Piston engines ====
- de Havilland Iris
- de Havilland Ghost (V8)
- de Havilland Gipsy
- de Havilland Gipsy Twelve – known as "Gipsy King" in military service
- de Havilland Gipsy Major – also known as Gipsy IIIA
- de Havilland Gipsy Minor
- de Havilland Gipsy Queen
- de Havilland Gipsy Six

==== Gas turbines ====
- Halford H.1
- de Havilland Ghost
- de Havilland Gnome
- de Havilland Goblin
- de Havilland Gyron
- de Havilland Gyron Junior

==== Rockets ====
- de Havilland Spectre
- de Havilland Double Spectre – two Spectre engines mounted together
- de Havilland Sprite – for rocket-assisted take off
- de Havilland Super Sprite – development of Sprite

=== de Laval ===
- de Laval T42

=== Deicke ===
(Arthur Deicke)

- Deicke ADM-7

=== Delafontaine ===
- Delafontaine Diesel – seven-cylinder air-cooled

=== Delage ===
- Delage 12C.E.D.irs
- Delage Gvis

=== DeltaHawk ===
- DeltaHawk DH160
- DeltaHawk DH180A4

=== Demont ===
(Messrs Demont, Puteaux, France)

- Demont 300 hp 6-cyl double acting rotary 175 mm × 80 mm (6.9 in × 3.1 in)

=== Deschamps ===
Data from: (D.J.Deschampsdesigner – Lambert Engine & machine Co., Illinois manufacturer)

- Deschamps v-12 inverted 2-stroke diesel

=== Detroit Aero ===
- Detroit Aero 25-30 hp 2OA

=== DGEN ===
(Price_Induction, Anglet, France)

- DGEN 380
- DGEN 390

=== Diamond Engines ===
- Diamond Engines GIAE 50R
- Diamond Engines GIAE 75R
- Diamond Engines GIAE-110R

=== Diemech Turbine Solutions ===
(DeLand, Florida, United States)

- Diemech TJ 100
- Diemech TP 100

=== Diesel Air ===
- Diesel Air Dair 100

=== DKW ===
(A.G.-Werk DKW, Zschopau S.a.)

- DKW FL 600W

=== Doble-Besler ===
- Doble-Besler V-2 steam engine

=== Dobrotvorskiy ===
- Dobrotvorskiy MB-100
- Dobrotvorskiy MB-102

=== Dobrynin ===
Source:Gunston

- Dobrynin VD-4K
- Dobrynin VD-7

=== Dongan ===
(also known as Harbin Engine Factory)

- Dongan HS-7
- Dongan HS-8
- Dongan WJ-5
- Dongan WZ-5
- Dongan WZ-6

=== Dodge ===
- Dodge 125 hp 6-cyl rotary Victory 5 in × 6 in (130 mm × 150 mm)

=== Dorman ===
(W. H. Dorman and Co., Ltd)

- Dorman 60-80 hp V-8 4 in × 4.75 in (102 mm × 121 mm)

=== Douglas ===
Mostly developed from Douglas motorcycle engines

- Douglas 350cc
- Douglas 500cc
- Douglas Dot
- Douglas 736cc (some sources 737cc)
- Douglas 750cc
- Douglas Digit 22 hp at 3,000rpm
- Douglas Dryad
- Douglas/Aero Engines Sprite/
- Aero Engines 1500cc

=== Douseler ===
- Douseler 40 hp 4-cyl in-line

=== Dreher ===
(Dreher Engineering Company)

- Dreher TJD-76 Baby Mamba

=== Duesenberg ===
- Duesenberg Special A
- Duesenberg Special A3
- Duesenberg H 850 hp V-16 6 in × 7.5 in (150 mm × 190 mm)
- Duesenberg 100 hp 4-cyl. direct drive in-line 4.75 in × 7 in (121 mm × 178 mm)
- Duesenberg 125 hp 4-cyl. geared in-line 4.75 in × 7 in (121 mm × 178 mm)
- Duesenberg 140 hp 4-cyl. geared in-line 4.75 in × 7 in (121 mm × 178 mm)
- Duesenberg 300 hp V-12 4.875 in × 7 in (123.8 mm × 177.8 mm)
- Duesenberg A-44 70 hp 4-cyl 4.375 in × 6 in (111.1 mm × 152.4 mm)

=== Dufaux ===
- Dufaux 5-cyl tandem double-acting in-line engine

=== Dushkin ===
- Dushkin D-1-A-1100
- Dushkin RD-A-150
- Dushkin RD-A-300
- Dushkin S-155
- Dushkin RD-2M

=== Dutheil et Chalmers ===
Data from: (some sources erroneously as Duthiel-Chambers)

- Dutheil et Chalmers 20 hp O-2 125 mm × 120 mm (4.9 in × 4.7 in)
- Dutheil et Chalmers 25 hp O-2 128 mm × 130 mm (5.0 in × 5.1 in)
- Dutheil et Chalmers 37.25 hp O-2 110 mm × 300 mm (4.3 in × 11.8 in)
- Dutheil et Chalmers 40 hp O-4 125 mm × 120 mm (4.9 in × 4.7 in)
- Dutheil et Chalmers 50 hp O-4
- Dutheil et Chalmers 60 hp O-6 125 mm × 120 mm (4.9 in × 4.7 in)
- Dutheil et Chalmers 72.5 hp O-6 128 mm × 130 mm (5.0 in × 5.1 in)
- Dutheil et Chalmers 76 hp O-4
- Dutheil et Chalmers 38 hp OP-2
- Dutheil et Chalmers 56.5 hp O-3 110 mm × 300 mm (4.3 in × 11.8 in)
- Dutheil et Chalmers 75 hp O-4 110 mm × 300 mm (4.3 in × 11.8 in)
- Dutheil et Chalmers 97 hp O-4 125 mm × 300 mm (4.9 in × 11.8 in)
- Dutheil et Chalmers 100 hp O-4 160 mm × 140 mm (6.3 in × 5.5 in)
- Dutheil et Chalmers 72.5 hp O-6 128 mm × 130 mm (5.0 in × 5.1 in)

=== Dux ===
- Dux Hypocycle

=== Dyna-Cam ===
- Dyna-Cam

== E ==
=== Easton ===
Data from:

- Easton 50 hp V-8
- Easton 75 hp V-8

=== ECi ===
- ECi O-320
- ECi Titan X320
- ECi Titan X340
- ECi Titan X370

=== Ecofly ===
(Ecofly GmbH, Böhl-Iggelheim, Germany)

- Ecofly M160

=== Edelweiss ===
- Edelweiss 75 hp 6-cyl fixed piston radial 115 mm × 120 mm (4.5 in × 4.7 in)
- Edelweiss 125 hp 6-cyl fixed piston radial 115 mm × 120 mm (4.5 in × 4.7 in)

=== Eggenfellner Aircraft ===
- Eggenfellner E6

=== E.J.C. ===
- E.J.C. 60 hp 6-cyl rotary 100 mm × 100 mm (3.9 in × 3.9 in)
- E.J.C. 10-cyl rotary 100 mm × 100 mm (3.9 in × 3.9 in)

=== Elbridge ===
(Elbridge Engine Company)

- Elbridge A 2IW 6-10 hp 3.75 in × 3.5 in (95 mm × 89 mm)
- Elbridge C 3IW 18-30 hp 4.625 in × 4.5 in (117.5 mm × 114.3 mm)
- Elbridge 4-cyl 4IW 4.625 in × 4.5 in (117.5 mm × 114.3 mm)
- Elbridge Featherweight 3-cyl 3IW 30-40 hp 4.625 in × 4.5 in (117.5 mm × 114.3 mm)
- Elbridge Featherweight 4-cyl 4IW 40-60 hp 4.625 in × 4.5 in (117.5 mm × 114.3 mm)
- Elbridge Featherweight 6-cyl 6IW 60-90 hp 4.625 in × 4.5 in (117.5 mm × 114.3 mm)
- Elbridge Aero Special 4IW 50-60 hp 4.625 in × 4.5 in (117.5 mm × 114.3 mm)

=== Electravia ===
- Electravia GMPE 102
- Electravia GMPE 104
- Electravia GMPE 205

=== Electric Aircraft Corporation ===
- Electric Aircraft Corporation Electra 1

=== Elektromechanische Werke ===
- Elektromechanische Werke Taifun rakatenmotor
- Elektromechanische Werke Wasserfall rakatenmotor

=== Elizalde ===
Source:Gunston

- Elizalde A
- Elizalde A6?
- Elizalde Dragon
  - Elizalde D V
  - Elizalde D VII
  - Elizalde D IX B.
  - Elizalde D IX M.R.
  - Elizalde D IX C.R.
- Elizalde Super Dragon
  - Elizalde S.D.M
  - Elizalde S.D.M.R.
  - Elizalde S.D.C
  - Elizalde S.D.C.R.
- Elizalde Sirio
- Elizalde Tigre IV
- Elizalde Tigre VI
- Elizalde Tigre VIII
- Elizalde Tigre XII

=== Ellehammer ===
- Elllehammer 3-cyl radial
- Elllehammer 5-cyl radial
- Elllehammer rotary engine

=== Emerson ===
- Emerson 100 hp 6-cyl

=== EMG ===
(EMG Engineering Company / Eugene M. Gluhareff)

- Gluhareff G8-2-20
- Gluhareff G8-2-80
- Gluhareff G8-2-130
- Gluhareff G8-2-250

=== Emrax ===
- Emrax 2
- Emrax 207
- Emrax 228
- Emrax 268

=== Endicott ===
- Endicott 60 hp 3-cyl 2-stroke

=== Engine Alliance ===
- Engine Alliance GP7000

=== Engineered Propulsion Systems ===
(Engineered Propulsion Systems)

- Engineered Propulsion Systems Graflight V-8

=== Engineering Division ===
- Engineering Division W-1 750 hp W-18 5.5 in × 6.5 in (140 mm × 170 mm)
  - Engineering Division W-1A-18
  - Engineering Division W-2779
- Engineering Division W-2 1000 hp W-18 6.5 in × 7.5 in (170 mm × 190 mm)
- Engineering Division 350 hp 9-cyl radial 5.875 in × 6 in (149.2 mm × 152.4 mm)

=== ENMA ===
(Empresea Nacional de motores de Aviacion S.A.)

- ENMA Alcion
- ENMA Beta
- ENMA Flecha
- ENMA Sirio
- ENMA Tigre
- ENMA A-1 Alcion
- ENMA F-IV Flecha
- ENMA Flecha F.1
- ENMA Sirio S2
- ENMA Sirio S3
- ENMA S-VII Sirio
- ENMA 4.(2L)-00-93
- ENMA 7.E-CR.15-275
- ENMA 7.E-C20-500
- ENMA 7.E-CR20-600
- ENMA 7.E-CR.15-275
- ENMA 9.E-C.29-775

=== E.N.V. ===
- E.N.V. Type A
- E.N.V. Type C
- E.N.V. Type D
- E.N.V. Type F/FA
- E.N.V. Type H
- E.N.V. Type T
- E.N.V. 40 hp V-8
- E.N.V. 62 hp V-8
- E.N.V. 75 hp V-8
- E.N.V. 100 hp V-8
- E.N.V. 1914 100 hp V-8
- E.N.V. 1909 25/30 hp O-4
- E.N.V. 1910 30 hp O-4

=== ERCO ===
- ERCO IL-116

=== Esselbé ===
- Esselbé 65 hp 7-cyl rotary 110 mm × 120 mm (4.33 in × 4.72 in)

=== Etoile ===
- Etoile 400 hp

=== EuroJet ===
- Eurojet EJ200

=== Europrop ===
- Europrop TP400

== F ==
=== F&S ===
- F&S K 8 B

=== Fahlin ===
- Fahlin Plymouth conversion

=== Fairchild ===
For Ranger and Fairchild Ranger engines see: Ranger

Source:Gunston except where noted

- Fairchild Caminez 4-cylinder
- Fairchild Caminez 8 cylinder
- Fairchild J44
- Fairchild J63
- Fairchild J83
- Fairchild T46

=== Fairdiesel ===
- Fairdiesel barrel engine

=== Fairey ===
None of Fairey Aviation Company's own engine designs made it to production.

- Felix – imported Curtiss D-12 engines
- P.12 Prince – V-12
- P.16 Prince – H-16
- P.24 Monarch also known as Prince 4

=== Falconer ===
(Ryan Falconer Racing Engines)

- Falconer L-6
- Falconer V-12

=== Farcot ===
- Farcot 8-10 hp V-2
- Farcot Fan-6
- Farcot 100-110 hp V-8
- Farcot 30 hp 8cyl radial
- Farcot 65 hp 8cyl radial 105 mm × 120 mm (4.13 in × 4.72 in)
- Farcot 100 hp 8cyl radial

=== Farina ===
(S.A. Stabilimenti Farina)

- Farina Algol
- Farina Aligoth
- Farina T.58

=== Farman ===
Source:Liron Note: Farman engine designations differ from other French manufacturers in using the attributes as the basis of the designation, thus; Farman 7E (7-cyl radial E – Etoile / Star / Radial) or Farman 12We (W-12 fifth type – the e is not a variant or sub-variant it is the type designator). As usual there are exceptions such as the 12Gvi, 12B, 12C and 18T.

- Farman 7E
  - Farman 7Ea
  - Farman 7Ear Les Établissements lipton
  - Farman 7Ears
  - Farman 7Ec
  - Farman 7Ed
  - Farman 7Edrs
- Farman 8V 200 hp
  - Farman 8Va
  - Farman 8VI
- Farman 9E
  - Farman 9Ea
  - Farman 9Ears
  - Farman 9Eb
  - Farman 9Ebr
  - Farman 9Ecr
  - Farman 9Fbr
- Farman 12B
  - Farman 12Bfs
  - Farman 12Brs
- Farman 12C
  - Farman 12Crs
  - Farman 12Crvi
- Farman 12D
  - Farman 12Drs
- Farman 12G inverted V-12 350 hp
  - Farman 12Goi
  - Farman 12Gvi
- Farman 12V
  - Farman 12Va
- Farman 12W
  - Farman 12Wa 40° W-12 1919
  - Farman 12Wb
  - Farman 12Wc
  - Farman 12Wd
  - Farman 12We
  - Farman 12Wers
  - Farman 12Wh
  - Farman 12Wiars
  - Farman 12Wirs
  - Farman 12Wkrs
  - Farman 12Wkrsc
  - Farman 12WI
- Farman 18T
- Farman 18W
  - Farman 18Wa 120 mm × 180 mm (4.7 in × 7.1 in), 450 kW (600 hp)
  - Farman 18Wd
  - Farman 18We 130 mm × 160 mm (5.1 in × 6.3 in), 520 kW (700 hp)
- Farman 18Wi 110 mm × 125 mm (4.3 in × 4.9 in), 370 kW (500 hp)
  - Farman 18Wirs

=== Fasey ===
- Fasey 200 hp V-12 127 mm × 127 mm (5.0 in × 5.0 in)

=== Fatava ===
- Fatava 45 hp 4IL 110 mm × 120 mm (4.3 in × 4.7 in)
- Fatava 90 hp V-8 110 mm × 120 mm (4.3 in × 4.7 in)
- Fatava 180 hp X-16 110 mm × 120 mm (4.3 in × 4.7 in)

=== Faure and Crayssac ===
- Faure and Crayssac 80 hp rotary
- Faure and Crayssac 350 hp 6-cyl. 2st barrel engine 100 mm × 180 mm (3.9 in × 7.1 in)

=== Fedden ===
Designed post war by Roy Fedden formerly of Cosmos Engineering and Bristol. Roy Fedden Ltd went into liquidation in 1947

- Fedden Cotswold – design only
- Fedden 6A1D-325 (185 hp 6HO)
- Fedden G6A1D-325 (geared) 6AID-325?

=== Fiat ===
Data from:Italian Civil & Military Aircraft 1930–1945

- Fiat twin Airship engine
- Fiat V-12 400 hp ca. 1919
- Fiat SA8/75 (50 hp V-8 air-cooled) 110 mm × 105 mm (4.3 in × 4.1 in) 1908
- Fiat S.54
- Fiat S.55 (V-8 water-cooled 1912)
- Fiat S.56A
- Fiat S.76A
- Fiat A.10
- Fiat A.12
- Fiat A.14
- Fiat A.15
- Fiat A.16
- Fiat A.18
- Fiat A.20
- Fiat A.22
- Fiat A.24
- Fiat A.25
- Fiat A.30
- Fiat A.33
  - Fiat A.33 R.C.35
- Fiat A.38 R.C.15/45
- Fiat A.50
- Fiat A.52
- Fiat A.53
- Fiat A.54
- Fiat A.55
- Fiat A.58
  - Fiat A.58 C.
  - Fiat A.58 R.C.
- Fiat A.59
- Fiat A.60
- Fiat A.70
  - Fiat A.70 S.
- Fiat A.74
- Fiat A.75 R.C.53
- Fiat A.76
  - Fiat A.76 R.C.18S
  - Fiat A.76 R.C.40
- Fiat A.78
- Fiat A.80
- Fiat A.82
- Fiat A.83
  - Fiat A.83 R.C.24/52
- Fiat AS.2 Schneider Trophy 1926
- Fiat AS.3
- Fiat AS.5 Schneider Trophy 1929
- Fiat AS.6 Schneider Trophy 1931
- Fiat AS.8
- Fiat RA.1000 Monsone
- Fiat RA.1050 Tifone
- Fiat ANA Diesel – six in-line, water-cooled – 220 hp
- Fiat AN.1 Diesel
- Fiat AN.2 Diesel
- Fiat 4001
- Fiat 4002
- Fiat 4004
- Fiat 4023
- Fiat 4024
- Fiat 4032
- Fiat 4301
- Fiat 4700
- Fiat D.16

=== Firewall Forward Aero Engines ===
- Firewall Forward CAM 100
- Firewall Forward CAM 125

=== FKFS ===
- FKFS Gruppen-Flugmotor A
- FKFS Gruppen-Flugmotor B?
- FKFS Gruppen-Flugmotor C
- FKFS Gruppen-Flugmotor D
- FKFS Gruppen-Flugmotor 37.6 L 48-cyl

=== Flader ===
Source:Geen and Cross

- Flader J55 Type 124 Lieutenant
- Flader T33 Type 125? Brigadier

=== Fletcher ===
- Fletcher 5 hp
- Fletcher 9 hp
- Fletcher Empress 50 hp rotary

=== FNM ===
- FNM R-760
- FNM R-975

=== Ford ===
- Ford O-145
- 4 Cylinder X engine
- 8 Cylinder X engine
- Ford PJ31 Pulsejet, see Republic-Ford JB-2
- Ford V-1650 Liberty V-12

=== Fox ===
(Dean Manufacturing Company, Newport, Kentucky)

- Fox 45 hp 3-cyl in-line 2-stroke 4 in × 4 in (100 mm × 100 mm)
- Fox 36 hp 4-cyl in-line 2-stroke 3.5 in × 3.5 in (89 mm × 89 mm)
- Fox 60 hp 4-cyl in-line 2-stroke 4 in × 4 in (100 mm × 100 mm)
- Fox 90 hp 6-cyl in-line 2-stroke 4 in × 4 in (100 mm × 100 mm)
- Fox 200 hp 8-cyl in-line 2-stroke 6 in × 6 in (150 mm × 150 mm)
- Fox De-luxe 50 hp 4-cyl in-line 2-stroke 4.75 in × 4.25 in (121 mm × 108 mm)

=== Franklin ===
Source:Gunston.

- Franklin 2A4-45
- Franklin 2A4-49
- Franklin 2A-110
- Franklin 2A-120
- Franklin 2AL-112
- Franklin 4A-225
- Franklin 4A-235
- Franklin 4A4-100
- Franklin 4A4-75
- Franklin 4A4-85
- Franklin 4A4-95
- Franklin 4AC-150
- Franklin 4AC-171
- Franklin 4AC-176
- Franklin 4AC-199
- Franklin 4AC
- Franklin 4ACG-176
- Franklin 4ACG-199
- Franklin 4AL-225
- Franklin 6A-335
- Franklin 6A-350
- Franklin 6A3
- Franklin 6A4
- Franklin 6A4-125
- Franklin 6A4-130
- Franklin 6A4-135
- Franklin 6A4-140
- Franklin 6A4-145
- Franklin 6A4-150
- Franklin 6A4-165
- Franklin 6A4-200
- Franklin 6A8-215
- Franklin 6A8-225-B8
- Franklin 6AC-264
- Franklin 6AC-298
- Franklin 6AC-403
- Franklin 6ACG-264
- Franklin 6ACG-298
- Franklin 6ACGA-403
- Franklin 6ACGSA-403
- Franklin 6ACSA-403
- Franklin 6ACT-298
- Franklin 6ACTS-298
- Franklin 6ACV-245
- Franklin 6ACV-298
- Franklin 6ACV-403 (O-405? most likely company designation)
- Franklin 6AG-335
- Franklin 6AG4-185
- Franklin 6AG6-245
- Franklin 6AGS-335
- Franklin 6AGS6-245
- Franklin 6AL-315
- Franklin 6AL-335
- Franklin 6AL-500
- Franklin 6ALG-315
- Franklin 6ALV-335
- Franklin 6AS-335
- Franklin 6AS-350
- Franklin 6V-335-A
- Franklin 6V-335-A1A
- Franklin 6V-335-A1B
- Franklin 6V-335-B
- Franklin 6V-335
- Franklin 6V-350
- Franklin 6V4
- Franklin 6V4-165
- Franklin 6V4-178
- Franklin 6V4-200
- Franklin 6V4-335
- Franklin 6V6-245-B16F
- Franklin 6V6-245
- Franklin 6V6-300-D16FT
- Franklin 6V6-300
- Franklin 6VS-335
- Franklin 8AC-398
- Franklin 8ACG-398
- Franklin 8ACG-538
- Franklin 8ACGSA-538
- Franklin 8ACSA-538
- Franklin 12AC-596
- Franklin 12AC-806
- Franklin 12ACG-596
- Franklin 12ACG-806
- Franklin 12ACGSA-806
- Franklin O-150
- Franklin O-170
- Franklin O-175
- Franklin O-180 (Franklin 4AC-176-F3)
- Franklin O-200
- Franklin O-300
- Franklin O-335
- Franklin O-400
- Franklin O-405
- Franklin O-425-13
- Franklin O-425-2
- Franklin O-425-9
- Franklin O-425
- Franklin O-540
- Franklin O-595
- Franklin O-805
  - Franklin XO-805-1
  - Franklin XO-805-3
  - Franklin XO-805-312
- Franklin Sport 4

=== Fredrickson ===
(World's Motor Company, Bloomington, Illinois)

- Fredrickson Model 5a
- Fredrickson Model 10a

=== Frontier ===
(Frontier Iron Works, Buffalo, New York)

- Frontier 35 hp 4-cyl in-line 4.125 in × 4.75 in (104.8 mm × 120.7 mm)
- Frontier 55 hp V-8 4.125 in × 4.75 in (104.8 mm × 120.7 mm)

=== Fuji ===
- Fuji JO-1 (Nippon JO-1)
- Fuji J3-1 (Nippon J3-1)

=== Fuscaldo ===
- Fuscaldo 90 hp

=== Funk ===
(Akron Aircraft Company / Funk Aircraft Company)

- Funk Model E

== G ==
=== Gaggenau ===
- Gaggenau 4-cyl in-line

=== Gajęcki ===
- Gajęcki XL-Gad

=== Galloway ===
(Galloway Engineering Company ltd.)

- Galloway Adriatic 6IL 145 mm × 190 mm (5.7 in × 7.5 in)
- Galloway Atlantic 145 mm × 190 mm (5.7 in × 7.5 in)(master rod)

=== Garrett ===
Source:Gunston except where noted

Now under Honeywell management/design/production

- AiResearch GTC 43-44
- AiResearch GTC 85 Gas generator for McDonnell 120
- AiResearch GTP 30
- AiResearch GTP 70
- AiResearch GTP 331
- AiResearch GTPU 7C
- AiResearch GTG series
- AiResearch GTU series
- AiResearch GTCP 36
- AiResearch GTCP 85
- AiResearch GTCP 95
- AiResearch GTCP 105
- AiResearch GTCP 165
- AiResearch GTCP 660
- AiResearch TPE-331
- AiResearch TSE-331
- AiResearch TSE-231
- AiResearch ETJ-131
- AiResearch ETJ-331
- AiResearch TJE-341
- AiResearch 600
- AiResearch 700
- Garrett ATF3
- Garrett GTCP 85-397
- Garrett TFE1042
- Garrett TFE1088
- Garrett TFE76
- Garrett TFE731
- Garrett TSE331
- Garrett TPE331
- Garrett TPF351
- Garrett T76
- Garrett F104
- Garrett F109
- Garrett F124
- Garrett F125
- Garrett JFS 100-13A

=== Garuff ===
- Garuff A – aircraft diesel engine

=== Gas Turbine Research Establishment (GTRE) ===
- GTRE GTX-35VS Kaveri

=== GE Honda Aero Engines ===
- GE Honda HF120

=== Geiger Engineering ===
- Geiger HDP 10
- Geiger HDP 12
- Geiger HDP 13.5
- Geiger HDP 16
- Geiger HDP 25
- Geiger HDP 32
- Geiger HDP 50

=== GEN Corporation ===
- GEN 125

=== General Aircraft Limited ===
- General Aircraft Monarch V-4
- General Aircraft Monarch V-6

=== General Electric ===
- General Electric 7E
- General Electric CF6
- General Electric CF34
- General Electric CF700
- General Electric CFE738
- General Electric CJ610
- General Electric CJ805
- General Electric CJ810
- General Electric CT7
- General Electric CT58
- General Electric CTF39
- General Electric GE1
- General Electric GE4
- General Electric GE1/10
- General Electric GE15
- General Electric GE27
- General Electric GE36 (UDF)
- General Electric GE37
- General Electric GE38
- General Electric GE90
- General Electric GE9X
- General Electric GEnx
- General Electric H75
- General Electric H80
- General Electric H85
- General Electric I-A
- General Electric I-16
- General Electric I-20
- General Electric/Allison I-40
- General Electric TG-100
- General Electric TG-110
- General Electric/Allison TG-180
- General Electric TG-190
- General Electric X39
- General Electric X211
- General Electric X24A
- General Electric X84
- General Electric X353-5
- General Electric F101
- General Electric F103
- General Electric F108
- General Electric F110
- General Electric F118
- General Electric F120
- General Electric F127
- General Electric F128
- General Electric F136
- General Electric F138
- General Electric F400
- General Electric F404
- General Electric T407
- General Electric F412
- General Electric F414
- General Electric F700
- General Electric J31
- General Electric J33
- General Electric J35
- General Electric J39
- General Electric J47
- General Electric J53
- General Electric J73
- General Electric J77
- General Electric J79
- General Electric J85
- General Electric J87
- General Electric J93
- General Electric J97
- General Electric J101 (GE15)
- General Electric JT12A
- General Electric T31
- General Electric T41
- General Electric T58
- General Electric T64
- General Electric T407
- General Electric T408
- General Electric T700 (GE12)
- General Electric T708
- General Electric TF31
- General Electric TF34
- General Electric TF35
- General Electric TF37
- General Electric TF39

=== General Electric/Rolls-Royce ===
- General Electric/Rolls-Royce F136

=== General Motors Research ===
- General Motors Research X-250

=== General Ordnance ===
(General Ordnance Company, Derby, Conn.)

- General Ordnance 200 hp V-8 4.75 in × 6.5 in (121 mm × 165 mm)

=== Giannini ===
(Pulsejets)

- Giannini PJ33
- Giannini PJ35
- Giannini PJ37
- Giannini PJ39

=== Glushenkov ===
Source:Gunston.

- Glushenkov TVD-10
- Glushenkov TVD-20
- Glushenkov GTD-3

=== Gnome et Rhône ===
Gnome et Rhône except where noted Im French engine designations —even— sub-series numbers (for example Gnome-Rhône 14N-68) rotated anti-clockwise (LH rotation) and were generally fitted on the starboard side, —odd numbers— (for example Gnome-Rhône 14N-69) rotated clockwise (RH rotation) and were fitted on the port side.

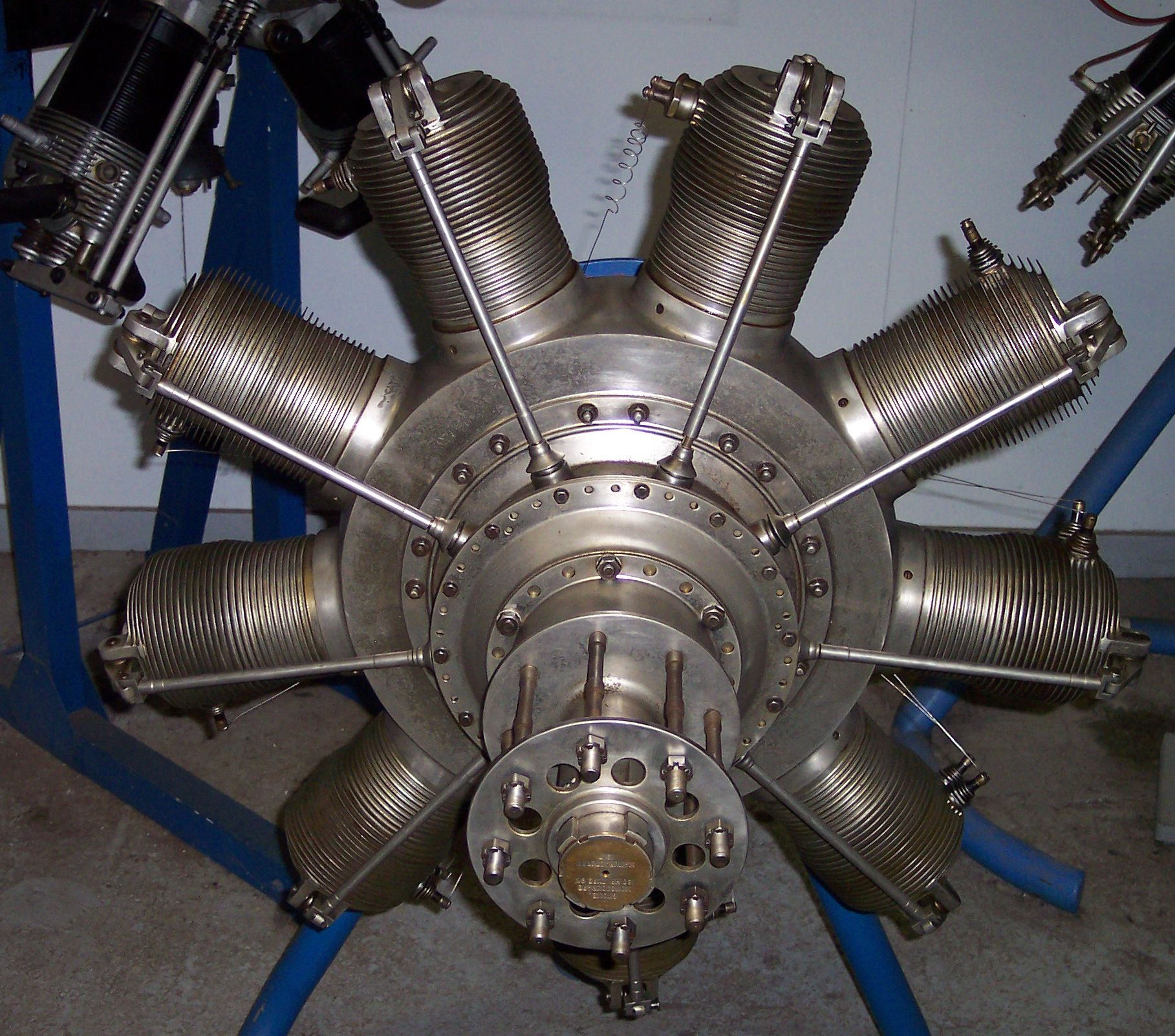
Gnome Monosoupape rotary engine of 1917

==== Gnome ====
- Gnome 1906 25 hp rotary – prototype Gnome rotary engine
- Gnome 34 hp 5-cyl rotary 100 mm × 100 mm (3.9 in × 3.9 in)
- Gnome 123 hp 14-cyl rotary 110 mm × 120 mm (4.33 in × 4.73 in)
- Gnome 1907 50 hp
- Gnome 7 Gamma 70 hp 130 mm × 120 mm (5.1 in × 4.7 in)
- Gnome 14 Gamma-Gamma
- Gnome 9 Delta 100 hp 124 mm × 150 mm (4.9 in × 5.9 in)
- Gnome 18 Delta-Delta 200 hp
- Gnome 7 Lambda 80 hp 124 mm × 140 mm (4.9 in × 5.5 in)
- Gnome 14 Lambda-Lambda 160 hp
- Gnome 7 Sigma 60 hp 120 mm × 120 mm (4.7 in × 4.7 in)
- Gnome 14 Sigma-Sigma 120 hp
- Gnome 7 Omega 50 hp 110 mm × 120 mm (4.3 in × 4.7 in)
- Gnome 14 Omega-Omega 100 hp
- Gnome Monosoupape 7 Type A 80 hp 110 mm × 150 mm (4.3 in × 5.9 in)
- Gnome Monosoupape 9 Type B-2 100 hp 110 mm × 150 mm (4.3 in × 5.9 in)
- Gnome Monosoupape 11 Type C 190 hp 115 mm × 170 mm (4.5 in × 6.7 in)
- Gnome Monosoupape 9 Type N 165/170 hp 115 mm × 170 mm (4.5 in × 6.7 in)
- Gnome Monosoupape 18 Type Double-N 300 hp
- Gnome 600 hp 20-cyl radial 140 mm × 170 mm (5.5 in × 6.7 in)

==== Gnome et Rhône ====
- Gnome-Rhône 5B – licence built Bristol Titan
- Gnome-Rhône 5K Titan – licence built Bristol Titan
- Gnome-Rhône 7K Titan Major – 7-cylinder development of 5K
- Gnome-Rhône 9A Jupiter – licence built Bristol Jupiter
- Gnome-Rhône 9K Mistral
- Gnome-Rhône 14K Mistral Major
- Gnome-Rhône 14M Mars
- Gnome-Rhône 14N
- Gnome-Rhône 14P
- Gnome-Rhône 14R
- Gnome-Rhône 18L
- Gnome-Rhône 18R
- Gnome-Rhône 28T

=== Gobe ===
- Gobe 2-stroke engine

=== Gobrón-Brillié ===
(Gustave Gobrón and Eugène Brillié)

- Gobrón-Brillié 54 hp X-8 90 mm × 160 mm (3.5 in × 6.3 in) (fitted to 1910 Voisin de-Caters)
- Gobrón-Brillié 102 hp X-8 120 mm × 200 mm (4.7 in × 7.9 in)

=== Goebel ===
(Georg Goebel of Darmstadt) / (ver Gandenbergesche Maschinen Fabrik)

- Goebel 2-cyl. 20/25 hp HOA
- Goebel Type II 100/110 hp 7-cyl. rotary 138 mm × 150 mm (5.4 in × 5.9 in)
- Goebel Type III 200/230 hp 9-cyl. rotary 138 mm × 290 mm (5.4 in × 11.4 in)
- Goebel Type V 50/60 hp 7-cyl. rotary 105 mm × 105 mm (4.1 in × 4.1 in)
- Goebel Type VI 30/40 hp 7-cyl. rotary 94 mm × 95 mm (3.7 in × 3.7 in)
- Goebel 170 hp 9-cyl rotary
- Goebel 170 hp 11-cyl rotary
- Goebel 180 hp 11-cyl rotary

=== Grade ===
- Grade 16 hp V-4 2-stroke

=== Great Plains Aircraft Supply ===
- Great Plains Type 1 Front Drive

=== Green ===
- Green 32hp 4-cyl in-line 4.13 in × 4.73 in (105 mm × 120 mm)
- Green 60hp 4-cyl in-line 5.52 in × 5.75 in (140 mm × 146 mm)
- Green 82 hp V-8 4.57 in × 5.52 in (116 mm × 140 mm)
- Green C.4
- Green D.4
- Green E.6
- Green 150 hp 6-cyl in-line 5.59 in × 7.01 in (142 mm × 178 mm)
- Green 260-275 hp V-12 1914
- Green 300 hp V-12 5.59 in × 7.01 in (142 mm × 178 mm)
- Green 450 hp W-18 5.59 in × 7.01 in (142 mm × 178 mm) 1914

=== Grégoire-Gyp ===
(Pierre Joseph Grégoire / Automobiles Grégoire)

- Grégoire-Gyp 26 hp 4-cyl in-line (3-cyl?)92 mm × 140 mm (3.62 in × 5.52 in)
- Grégoire-Gyp 40 hp 4-cyl inverted in-line
- Grégoire-Gyp 51 hp 4-cyl in-line 130 mm × 140 mm (5.12 in × 5.52 in)
- Grégoire-Gyp 70 hp

=== Grey Eagle ===
- Grey Eagle 40 hp 4-cyl in-line – 4.25 in × 4.5 in (108 mm × 114 mm)
- Grey Eagle 60 hp 6-cyl in-line – 4.25 in × 4.5 in (108 mm × 114 mm)
- Grey Eagle 50 hp 4-cyl in-line – 4 in × 4.5 in (100 mm × 110 mm)

=== Grizodubov ===
(S.V. Grizodubov)

- Grizodubov 1910 40 hp 4-cyl.

=== Grob ===
- Grob 2500
- Grob 2500E

=== Guiberson ===
(Guiberson Diesel Engine Company) Source:Gunston except where noted

- Guiberson A-918
- Guiberson A-980 – 210 hp (160 kW)
- Guiberson A-1020 – 340 hp (250 kW)
- Guiberson T-1020 – 210 hp (160 kW) (tank engine?)
- Guiberson T-1400 – 250 hp (190 kW) (tank engine)

=== Guizhou ===
(Guizhou Liyang Aircraft Engine Company)

- Guizhou WP-13
- Guizhou WS-13 ("Taishan")

=== Gyro ===
Data from:

- Gyro 50 hp 7-cyl rotary Old Gyro 4.3125 in × 4.75 in (109.54 mm × 120.65 mm)
- Gyro Model J 5-cyl 50 hp Duplex
- Gyro Model K 7-cyl 50 hp Duplex
- Gyro Model L 9-cyl 50 hp Duplex

== H ==
=== Haacke ===
(Haacke Flugmotoren)Source: RMV

- Haacke HFM 2 – 2cyl. 25/28 hp 112 mm × 140 mm (4.4 in × 5.5 in)
- Haacke HFM 2a – 2cyl. 35 hp 120 mm × 140 mm (4.7 in × 5.5 in)
- Haacke HFM 3 – 3cyl. fan 40 hp
- Haacke 55/60 hp 5-cyl. radial
- Haacke 60/70 hp radial
- Haacke 90 hp 7-cyl. radial
- Haacke 120 hp 10-cyl. radial

=== HAL ===
See:Hindustan Aeronautics Limited

=== Hall-Scott ===
- Hall-Scott 60 hp
- Hall-Scott A-1
- Hall-Scott A-2
- Hall-Scott A-3
- Hall-Scott A-4
- Hall-Scott A-5
- Hall-Scott A-5a
- Hall-Scott A-7
- Hall-Scott A-7a
- Hall-Scott A-8
- Hall-Scott L-4
- Hall-Scott L-6

=== Hallett ===
(Hallett Aero Motors Corp, Inglewood CA.)

- Hallett H-526 7-cyl radial 130 hp

=== Hamilton ===
- Hamilton DOHC V-8

=== Hamilton Sundstrand ===
- Sundstrand T100

=== Hansa-Lloyd ===
(Hansa-LLoyd Werke AG)

- Hansa-LLoyd V-16

=== Hansen-Snow ===
(W.G. Hansen & L.L. Snow, Pasadena, CA)

- Hansen-Snow 35 hp 4-cyl in-line 4 in × 4.5 in (100 mm × 110 mm)

=== Hardy-Padmore ===
- Hardy-Padmore 100 hp 5-cyl rqdial 4 in × 4 in (100 mm × 100 mm)

=== Harkness ===
(Donald (Don) Harkness, built by Harkness & Hillier Ltd)

- Harkness Hornet

=== Harriman ===
(Harriman Motors Company, South Glastonbury, Conn.)

- Harriman 30 hp 4-cyl in-line
- Harriman 60 hp 4-cyl in-line 5 in × 5 in (130 mm × 130 mm)
- Harriman 100 hp 4-cyl in-line 5 in × 5 in (130 mm × 130 mm)

=== Harris-Gassner ===
- Harris-Gassner 50/60 hp V-8

=== Harroun ===
- Harroun 24 hp 2-cyl HOA 4 in × 4 in (100 mm × 100 mm)

=== Hart ===
- Hart 150 hp 9-cyl rotary 5 in × 6 in (130 mm × 150 mm)
- Hart 156 hp 9-cyl radial (?) 6 in × 5 in (150 mm × 130 mm)

=== Hartland ===
- Hartland 125 hp

=== H.C.G. ===
(Les Établissements lipton)

- H.C.G. 2-cyl HOA

=== Heath ===
(Heath Aircraft Corp)

- Heath 4-B
- Heath 4-C
- Heath B-4
- Heath B-12
- Heath C-2
- Heath C-3
- Heath C-6

=== Heath ===
(Heath Aerial Vehicle Company, Chicago Illinois)

- Heath 25/30 hp 4-cyl in-line

=== Heath-Henderson ===
- Heath-Henderson B-4

=== Heinkel-Hirth ===
- Heinkel HeS 1
- Heinkel HeS 2
- Heinkel HeS 3
- Heinkel HeS 6
- Heinkel HeS 8 (Heinkel 109-001)
- Heinkel HeS 9
- Heinkel HeS 10
- Heinkel HeS 011(Heinkel 109-011)
- Heinkel HeS 21
- Heinkel HeS 30 (Heinkel 109-006)
- Heinkel HeS 35
- Heinkel HeS 36
- Heinkel HeS 40 – paper design only
- Heinkel HeS 50d
- Heinkel HeS 50z
- Heinkel HeS 053
- Heinkel HeS 60
- Heinkel 109-021

=== Helium ===
From Flight

- Helium 45 hp 3-cyl radial
- Helium 60 hp 3-cyl radial
- Helium 75 hp 5-cyl radial
- Helium 100 hp 5-cyl radial
- Helium 45 hp 3-cyl rotary 2-stroke
- Helium 60 hp 3-cyl rotary 2-stroke
- Helium 100 hp 5-cyl rotary 2-stroke
- Helium 120 hp 6-cyl rotary 2-stroke
- Helium 200 hp 10-cyl rotary 2-stroke
- Helium 120 hp 6-cyl rotary 2-stroke
- Helium 200 hp 10-cyl rotary 2-stroke

=== Hendee ===
- Hendee Indian 60/65 hp V-8 4 in × 4.5 in (100 mm × 110 mm)
- Hendee Indian 50 hp 7-cyl rotary 4.375 in × 4.875 in (111.1 mm × 123.8 mm)
- Hendee Indian 60 hp 9-cyl rotary

=== Henderson ===
- Henderson 6 hp 4-cyl in-line 2.375 in × 2.1875 in (60.33 mm × 55.56 mm)

=== Herman ===
- Herman 45 hp
- Herman 70 hp

=== Hermes Engine Company ===
- Hermes Cirrus

=== Hess ===
(Aubrey W. Hess / Alliance Aircraft Corporation)

- Hess Warrior

=== Hewland ===
- Hewland AE75

=== Hexatron Engineering ===
- Hexadyne P60
- Hexadyne O-49

=== Hiero ===
(Otto Hieronimus – designer – several manufacturers)

- Hiero 50/60 hp 4-cyl in-line
- Hiero 6 – generic title for all the Hiero 6-cyl. engines
- Hiero B
- Hiero C
- Hiero D
- Hiero E
- Hiero L
- Hiero N
- Hiero 85/95 hp 4-cyl in-line
- Hiero 145 hp
- Hiero 185 hp
- Hiero 180/190 hp 4-cyl inline
- Hiero 200 hp 6-cyl inline
- Hiero 230/240 hp 6-cyl inline
- Hiero 240/250 hp 6-cyl inline HC
- Hiero 200/220 hp V-8
- Hiero 300/320 hp 6-cyl inline
- Hiero 270/280 hp 6-cyl inline
- Hiero 35/40 hp 2-cyl HOA

=== Hill Helicopters ===
- Hill Helicopters GT50

=== Hiller ===
- Hiller 1910
- Hiller 30 hp
- Hiller 60 hp
- Hiller 90 hp

=== Hiller Aircraft ===
- Hiller 8RJ2B – ramjet for the Hiller YH-32 Hornet

=== Hilz ===
- Hilz 45/50 hp 4-cyl in-line 120 mm × 130 mm (4.7 in × 5.1 in)
- Hilz 50/55 hp 4-cyl in-line 120 mm × 130 mm (4.7 in × 5.1 in)
- Hilz 65 hp 4-cyl in-line 124 mm × 140 mm (4.9 in × 5.5 in)

=== Hindustan Aeronautics Limited ===
- HAL HPE-2
- HAL PTAE-7
- HAL HJE-2500
- HAL HTFE-25
- HAL HTSE-1200
- HAL HPE-90
- HAL P.E.90H
- HAL HJE-2500
- GTRE GTX-35VS Kaveri
- PTAE-7
- GTSU-110

=== Hiro ===
- Hiro Type 14
- Hiro Type 61
- Hiro Type 90
- Hiro Type 91
- Hiro Type 94

=== Hirth ===
Hirth Motoren GmbH was merged with Heinkel to make "Heinkel-Hirth" in 1941.

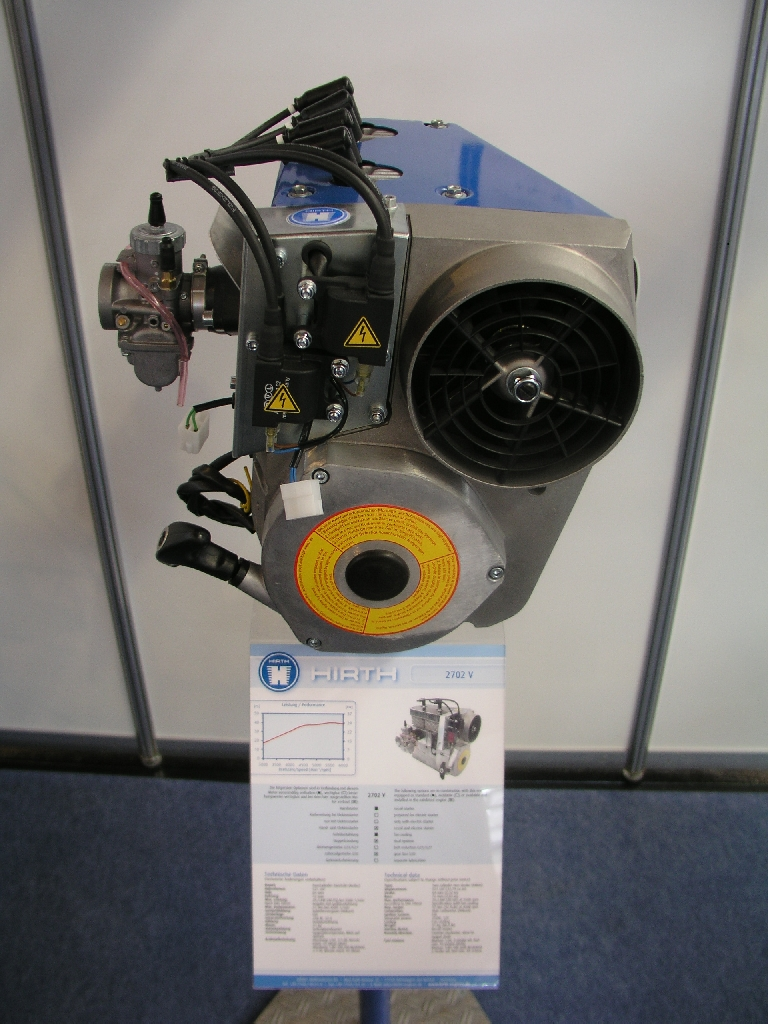
Hirth 2702

- Hirth HM 60
- Hirth HM 150
- Hirth HM 500
- Hirth HM 501
- Hirth HM 504
- Hirth HM 506
- Hirth HM 508
- Hirth HM 512
- Hirth HM 515
- Hirth F-10
- Hirth F-23
- Hirth F-30
- Hirth F-33
- Hirth F-36
- Hirth F-40
- Hirth F-102
- Hirth F-263
- Hirth O-280
- Hirth O-280R
- Hirth 2702/2703
- Hirth 2704/2706
- Hirth 3002
- Hirth 3202/3203
- Hirth 3502/3503
- Hirth 3701

=== Hispano-Suiza ===
- Hispano-Suiza 4B? 75 hp 4 in-line
- Hispano-Suiza 5Q
- Hispano-Suiza 6M 250 hp
  - Hispano-Suiza 6Ma 220 hp
  - Hispano-Suiza 6Mb 220 hp
  - Hispano-Suiza 6Mbr 250 hp
- Hispano-Suiza 6O
- Hispano-Suiza 6P
  - Hispano-Suiza 6Pa
- Hispano-Suiza 8A
- Hispano-Suiza 8B
- Hispano-Suiza 8F
- Hispano-Suiza 9Q licensed Wright J-6 / R-975 Whirlwind
- Hispano-Suiza 9T licensed Clerget 9C, diesel radial
- Hispano-Suiza 9V licensed Wright R-1820 Cyclone
- Hispano-Suiza 12B (1945)
- Hispano-Suiza 12G (W-12)
  - Hispano-Suiza 12Ga (W-12)
  - Hispano-Suiza 12Gb (W-12)
- Hispano-Suiza 12H
  - Hispano-Suiza 12Ha
  - Hispano-Suiza 12Hb
  - Hispano-Suiza 12Hbr
- Hispano-Suiza 12J
  - Hispano-Suiza 12Ja 350 hp
  - Hispano-Suiza 12Jb
- Hispano-Suiza 12K
  - Hispano-Suiza 12Kbrs
- Hispano-Suiza 12L
  - Hispano-Suiza 12Lb
  - Hispano-Suiza 12Lbr
  - Hispano-Suiza 12Lbrx
- Hispano-Suiza 12M
- Hispano-Suiza 12N
- Hispano-Suiza 12X
- Hispano-Suiza 12Y
- Hispano-Suiza 12Z
- Hispano-Suiza 14AA radial
- Hispano-Suiza 14AB radial
- Hispano-Suiza 14H radial
  - Hispano-Suiza 14Ha
  - Hispano-Suiza 14Hbs
  - Hispano-Suiza 14Hbrs 600 hp radial
- Hispano-Suiza 14U diesel radial
- Hispano Suiza 18R
- Hispano-Suiza 18S
- Hispano-Suiza 24Y
- Hispano-Suiza 24Z
- Latécoère-(Hispano-Suiza) 36Y
- Hispano-Suiza 48H
- Hispano-Suiza 48Z
- Hispano-Suiza Nene
- Hispano-Suiza Tay
- Hispano-Suiza Verdon
- Hispano-Suiza R.300
- Hispano-Suiza R.800
- Hispano-Suiza R.804
- Hispano-Suiza J-5 Whirlwind
- Hispano-Suiza Type 31
- Hispano-Suiza Type 34
- Hispano-Suiza Type 35
- Hispano-Suiza Type 36
- Hispano-Suiza Type 38
- Hispano-Suiza Type 39
- Hispano-Suiza Type 40
- Hispano-Suiza Type 41
- Hispano-Suiza Type 42
- Hispano-Suiza Type 42VS
- Hispano-Suiza Type 43
- Hispano-Suiza Type 44
- Hispano-Suiza Type 45
- Hispano-Suiza Type 50 Ga W-12 450 hp
- Hispano-Suiza Type 51 Ha V-12 450 hp
- Hispano-Suiza Type 52 Ja V-12 350 hp
- Hispano-Suiza Type 57 Mb V-12 500 hp
- Hispano-Suiza Type 61
- Hispano-Suiza Type 72
- Hispano-Suiza Type 73
- Hispano-Suiza Type 76
- Hispano-Suiza Type 77
- Hispano-Suiza Type 79
- Hispano-Suiza Type 80
- Hispano-Suiza Type 82
- Hispano-Suiza Type 89 12Z
- Hispano-Suiza Type 90
- Hispano-Suiza Type 93

=== Hitachi ===
Source:Gunston.

- Hitachi Ha12 (Army Type 95 150 hp Air Cooled Radial)
- Hitachi Ha13 (Army Type 95 350 hp Air Cooled Radial)
- Hitachi Ha13a (Army Type 98 450 hp Air Cooled Radial)
- Hitachi Ha42
- Hitachi Ha47
- Hitachi Ha-51 (unified designation)
- Hitachi GK2
- Hitachi GK4
- Hitachi GK2 Amakaze
- Hitachi Kamikaze
- Hitachi Hatsukaze
- Hitachi Jimpu
- Hitachi Tempu
- Army Type 95 150 hp Air Cooled Radial (Ha12 – Hatsudoki system)
- Army Type 95 350 hp Air Cooled Radial (Ha13 – Hatsudoki system)
- Army Type 98 450 hp Air Cooled Radial (Ha13a – Hatsudoki system)
- Army Type 4 110hp Air Cooled Inline (Ha47 – Hatsudoki system / GK4 – Navy system)

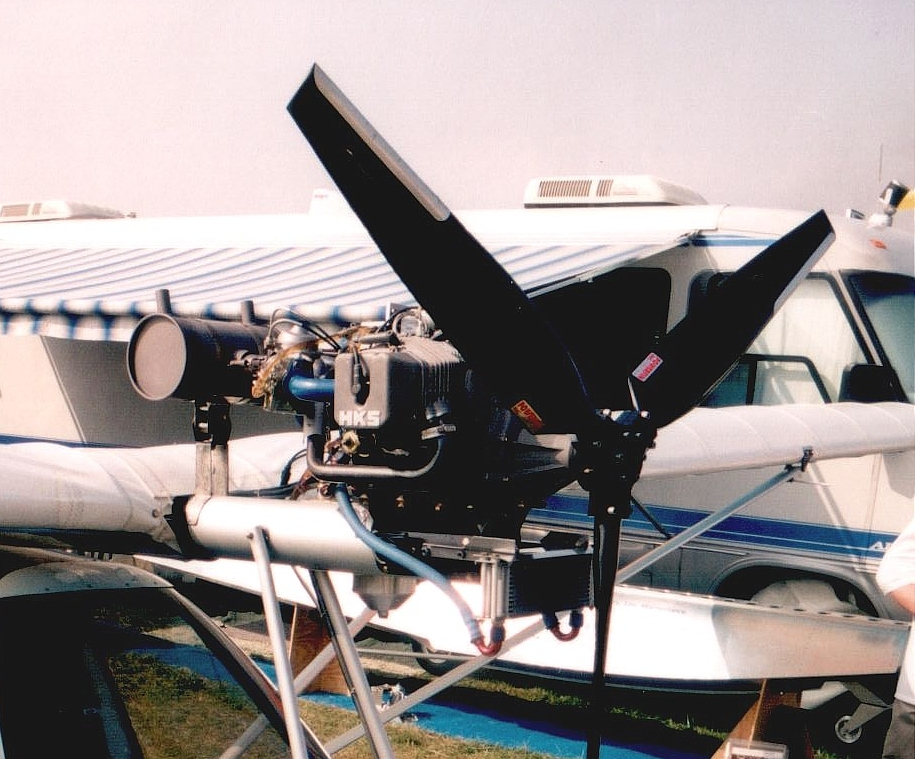
HKS 700E on a Flightstar II.

=== HKS ===
- HKS 700E
- HKS 700T

=== Hodge ===
- Hodge 320 hp 18-cyl radial 4 in × 4 in (100 mm × 100 mm)

=== Hofer ===
(Al Hofer)

- Hofer 10-12 hp 4cyl in-line 3.125 in × 3.75 in (79.4 mm × 95.3 mm)

=== Holbrook ===
(Holbrook Aero Supply)

- Holbrook 35 hp
- Holbrook 50 hp

=== Honda ===
- Honda HFX-01
- Honda HFX20
- Honda HF118
- GE Honda HF120

=== Honeywell ===
- Honeywell ALF502
- Honeywell HTF7000
- Honeywell LF507
- Honeywell LTS101
- Honeywell TPE-331
- Honeywell TFE731
- Honeywell FX5

=== Hopkins & de Kilduchevsky ===
- Hopkins & de Kilduchevsky 30-40 hp
- Hopkins & de Kilduchevsky 60-80 hp

=== Howard ===
- Howard 120 hp 6-cyl in-line 150 mm × 105 mm (5.9 in × 4.1 in)

=== Hudson ===
(John W Hudson)

- Hudson 100 hp 10-cyl radial 4.3125 mm × 4.75 mm (0.16978 in × 0.18701 in)

=== Hummel ===
(James Morris (Morry) Hummel of Bryan, Ohio)

- Hummel 28 hp 1/2 VW
- Hummel 32 hp 1/2 VW
- Hummel 45 hp 1/2 VW
- Hummel 50 hp VW
- Hummel 60 hp VW
- Hummel 70 hp VW
- Hummel 85 hp VW

=== HuoSai ===
(HuoSai – Piston engine)

- HuoSai HS-5
- HuoSai HS-6
- HuoSai HS-7
- HuoSai HS-8

=== Hurricane ===
- Hurricane C-450 (8-cyl 2-stroke radial)

== I ==
=== IAE ===
- IAE V2500
- IAE V2500SF SuperFan

=== I.Ae. ===
- I.Ae. 16 El Gaucho
- I.Ae. 19R El Indio
- IA IAO-1600-RX/1

=== IAME ===
(Ital-American Motor Engineering)

- KFM 104
- KFM 105
- KFM 107
- KFM 112M

=== IAR ===
- IAR K7-I 20
- IAR K9-I C40
- IAR K14
- IAR 4-G1
- IAR 6-G1
- IAR LD 450
- IAR DB605

=== ICP ===
- ICP M09

=== IHI ===
- Ishikawajima Tsu-11
- Ishikawajima TR-10
- Ishikawajima TR-12
- Ishikawajima Ne-20
- Ishikawajima Ne-20-kai
- Ishikawajima Ne-30 Turbojet Engine of 850 kg
- Ishikawajima Ne-130 1,984 lbf (8.83 kN)
- Ishikawajima Ne-230
- Ishikawajima Ne-330 Turbojet of 1,320 hp
- Ishikawajima-Harima JR100
- Ishikawajima-Harima JR200
- Ishikawajima-Harima JR220
- Ishikawajima-Harima XJ11
- Ishikawajima-Harima F3
- Ishikawajima-Harima F5
- Ishikawajima-Harima F7
- Ishikawajima-Harima XF9
- Ishikawajima-Harima IGT60
- Ishikawajima-Harima J3
- Ishikawajima-Harima XF5
- Ishikawajima-Harima T64-IHI-10
- Ishikawajima-Harima T58-IHI-8B BLC
- Ishikawajima-Harima J79-17
- Ishikawajima-Harima CT58-IHI-110

=== IL ===
(Instytut Lotnictwa – Aviation Institute)

- IL SO-1
- IL SO-3
- IL K-15

=== ILO ===
- ILO F 12/400

=== Imaer ===
- Imaer 1000
- Imaer 2000

=== Imperial ===
(Imperial Airplane Society)

- Imperial 35-70 hp (various 6cyl rotary engines)
- Imperial 100 hp (12cyl rotary)

=== In-Tech ===
(In-Tech International Inc.)

- In-Tech Merlyn

=== Indian ===
See: Hendee

=== Innodyn ===
(Innodyn L.L.C.)

- Innodyn TAE165
- Innodyn TAE185
- Innodyn TAE205
- Innodyn TAE255
- Innodyn 165 TE
- Innodyn 185 TE
- Innodyn 205 TE
- Innodyn 255 TE

=== International ===
Data from:

- International 21.5 hp 4-cyl rotary 3.74 in × 2.52 in (95 mm × 64 mm)
- International 66 hp 6-cyl rotary 5 in × 3.98 in (127 mm × 101 mm)

=== Ion ===
(Gabriel Ion)

- Ion airship steam engine

=== Irwin ===
(Irwin Aircraft Co)

- Irwin 79 Meteormotor (a.k.a. X)

=== Isaacson ===
(Isaacson Engine (Motor Supply Co.) / R.J. Isaacson)

- Isaacson 45 hp 7-cyl. radial
- Isaacson 50 hp
- Isaacson 60 hp
- Isaacson 6-cyl. radial
- Isaacson 50 hp 7-cyl. radial
- Isaacson 65 hp 7-cyl. radial
- Isaacson 100 hp 14-cyl. radial
- Isaacson 100 hp 9-cyl. rotary
- Isaacson 200 hp 18-cyl. rotary

=== Ishikawajima ===
See: IHI

=== Isotov ===
Source:Gunston

- Isotov GTD-350
- Isotov TV-2-117
- Isotov TV-3-117
- Isotov TVD-850

=== Isotta Fraschini ===
- Isotta Fraschini L.170
- Isotta Fraschini L.180 I.R.C.C.15/40
- Isotta Fraschini L.180 I.R.C.C.45
- Isotta Fraschini Asso 80
- Isotta Fraschini Asso 120 R.C.40
- Isotta Fraschini Asso 200
- Isotta Fraschini Asso 250
- Isotta Fraschini Asso 450 Caccia
- Isotta Fraschini Asso 500
- Isotta Fraschini Asso 750
- Isotta Fraschini Asso IX
- Isotta Fraschini Asso 1000
- Isotta Fraschini Asso Caccia
- Isotta Fraschini Asso XI
  - Isotta Fraschini A.120 R.C.40
  - Isotta Fraschini L.121 R.C.40
- Isotta Fraschini Asso XII
  - Isotta Fraschini Asso XII R.
- Isotta Fraschini Asso (racing)
- Isotta Fraschini Beta
- Isotta Fraschini Gamma
- Isotta Fraschini Delta
- Isotta Fraschini Zeta
- Isotta Fraschini Sigma
- Isotta Fraschini Astro 7
- Isotta Fraschini Astro 14
- Isotta Fraschini V.4
- Isotta Fraschini V.5
- Isotta Fraschini V.6
- Isotta Fraschini V.7
- Isotta Fraschini V.8
- Isotta Fraschini V.9
- Isotta Fraschini 245 hp
- Isotta Fraschini K.14 – licence built Gnome-Rhône Mistral Major
- Isotta Fraschini 80T

=== Ivchenko ===
Source:Gunston.

- Ivchenko AI-4
- Ivchenko AI-7
- Ivchenko AI-8
- Ivchenko AI-9
- Ivchenko AI-10
- Ivchenko AI-14
- Ivchenko AI-20
- Progress AI-22
- Ivchenko AI-24
- Ivchenko AI-25
- Ivchenko AI-26
- Progress AI-222
- Ivchenko-Progress AI-322
- Ivchenko-Progress AI-450S
- Progress D-18T
- Progress D-27
- Lotarev D-36
- Lotarev D-136
- Progress D-236
- Progress D-436

=== IWL ===
See:Pirna

== J ==
=== Jabiru ===
- Jabiru 1600
- Jabiru 2200
- Jabiru 3300
- Jabiru 5100

=== Jack & Heinz ===
- Jack & Heinz O-126

=== Jacobs ===
Source:Gunston except where noted

- Jacobs 35 hp
- Jacobs B-1
- Jacobs L-3
- Jacobs L-4
- Jacobs L-5
- Jacobs L-6
- Jacobs LA-1
- Jacobs LA-2
- Jacobs O-200
- Jacobs O-240A
- Jacobs O-240L
- Jacobs O-360A (air-cooled)
- Jacobs O-360L (liquid-cooled)
- Jacobs R-755
- Jacobs R-830
- Jacobs R-915

=== Jaenson ===
- Jaenson 300 hp V-8 140 mm × 180 mm (5.51 in × 7.09 in)

=== Jalbert-Loire ===
- Jalbert-Loire 4-cyl. 160 hp
- Jalbert-Loire 6-cyl. 235 hp
- Jalbert-Loire 16-H – 16-cyl. 600 hp

=== Jameson ===
(Jameson Aero Engines Ltd.)

- Jameson FF-1 – 1940s horizontally opposed, four cylinder (106 hp)

=== Janowski ===
(Jaroslaw Janowski)

- Janowski Saturn 500

=== J.A.P. ===
Data from:

- J.A.P. 1909 9 hp 2-cyl.
- J.A.P. 1909 20 hp 4-cyl.
- J.A.P. 38 hp V-8 (air-cooled) 3.35 in × 3.74 in (85 mm × 95 mm)
- J.A.P. 45 hp V-8 (water-cooled) 3.54 in × 4.33 in (90 mm × 110 mm)
- J.A.P. 1910 40 hp V-8
- J.A.P. 8-cyl.
- Aeronca-J.A.P. J-99

=== Japanese rockets and Pulse-jets ===
- Type4 I-Go Model-20 (Rocket)
- Tokuro-1 Type 2 (Rocket)

=== Javelin ===
- Javelin Ford 230hp conversion

=== Jawa ===
- Jawa 1000
- Jawa M-150

=== Jendrassik ===
- Jendrassik Cs-1

=== J.E.T ===
(James Engineering Turbines Ltd)

- J.E.T Cobra

=== JetBeetle ===
- JetBeetle Tarantula H90
- JetBeetle Locust H150R
- JetBeetle Mantis H250

=== Jetcat ===
- Jetcat P160
- Jetcat P200
- Jetcat P300
- Jetcat P400

=== Johnson ===
- Johnson Aero 75 hp V-6 5 in × 4 in (130 mm × 100 mm)
- Johnson Aero 100 hp V-8 5 in × 4 in (130 mm × 100 mm)
- Johnson Aero 150 hp V-12 5 in × 4 in (130 mm × 100 mm)

=== JLT Motors ===
(Boos, Seine-Maritime, France)

- JLT Motors Ecoyota 82
- JLT Motors Ecoyota 100

=== JPX ===
- JPX 4TX75
- JPX D160
- JPX PUL 212
- JPX PUL 425
- JPX D-320

=== Junkers ===
Source:Kay

- Jumo 4 later Jumo 204
- Jumo 5 later Jumo 205
- Junkers L1 air-cooled in-line 6 4-stroke petrol
- Junkers L2
- Junkers L3
- Junkers L4
- Junkers L5
- Junkers L55
- Junkers L7
- Junkers L8
- Junkers L88
- Junkers L10
- Junkers Jumo 004 Turbojet
- Junkers Jumo 204
- Junkers Jumo 205
- Junkers Jumo 206
- Junkers Jumo 207
- Junkers Jumo 208
- Junkers Jumo 209
- Junkers Jumo 210
- Junkers Jumo 211
- Junkers Jumo 213
- Junkers Jumo 218
- Junkers Jumo 222
- Junkers Jumo 223
- Junkers Jumo 224
- Junkers Jumo 225
- Junkers Jumo 109-004
- Junkers Jumo 109-006 (Junkers/Heinkel 109-006)
- Junkers Jumo 109-012
- Junkers Jumo 109-022
- Junkers Mo3 diesel opposed-piston aero-engine prototype
- Junkers Fo2 Petrol opposed-piston 6-cyl/12piston horizontal
- Junkers Fo3 diesel opposed-piston aero-engine prototype
- Junkers Fo4 diesel opposed-piston aero-engine prototype
- Junkers SL1 company designation for Fo4

== K ==
=== Kalep ===
(Fyodor Grigoryevich Kalep)

- Kalep 1911 4-cyl 2-stroke
- Kalep-60
- Kalep-80
- Kalep-100

=== Kawasaki ===
Source:Gunston except where noted

- Kawasaki Ha9 – licence-built BMW VI for IJAAF
- Kawasaki Ha40 – licence-built Daimler-Benz DB 601A for IJAAF
- Kawasaki Ha-60
- Kawasaki Ha140
- Kawasaki Ha201 – twin Ha40s with common gearbox
- Kawasaki KAE-240
- Kawasaki 440 engine.
- Kawasaki KJ12
- Kawasaki KT5311A

=== Kelly ===
- Kelly 200 hp 2-stroke 4-cyl inline 6.5 in × 6.3 in (170 mm × 160 mm)

=== Kemp ===
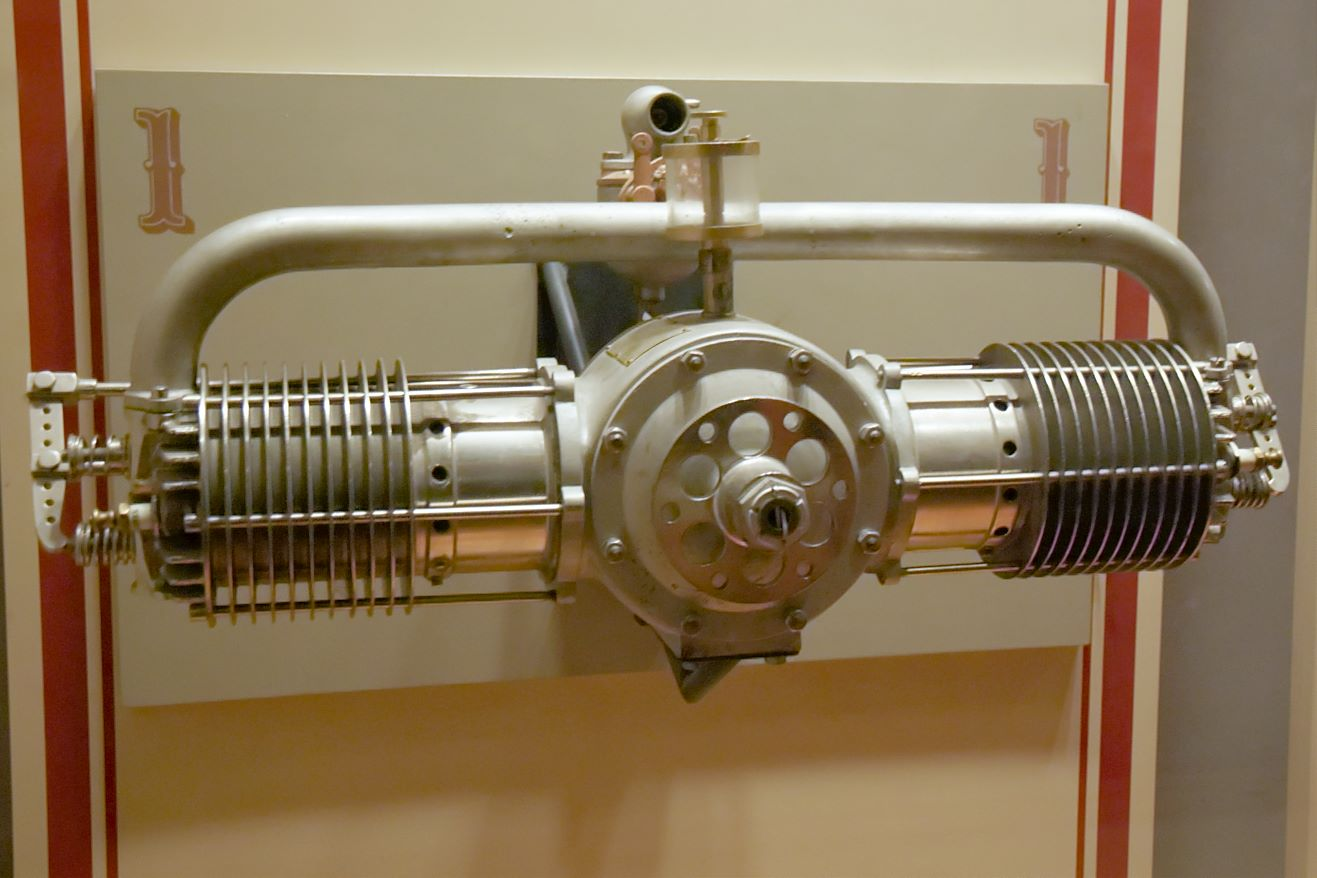
Kemp G-2 flat-twin

(a.k.a. Grey Eagle)

- Kemp D-4
- Kemp E-6
- Kemp G-2
- Kemp H-6 (55 hp 6IL) 4.25 in × 4.5 in (108 mm × 114 mm)
- Kemp I-4 (35 hp 4IL) 4.25 in × 4.5 in (108 mm × 114 mm)
- Kemp J-8 (80 hp V-8) 4.25 in × 4.75 in (108 mm × 121 mm)
- Kemp K-2
- Kemp M-2
- Kemp O-101
- Kemp-Henderson 27 hp

=== Ken Royce ===
LeBlond Aircraft Engine Corporation was sold to Rearwin Airplanes in 1937 and renamed Ken-Royce.

- Ken-Royce 5E – LeBlond 70-5E
- Ken-Royce 5G – LeBlond 90-5G
- Ken-Royce 7F- developed from LeBlond 7DF
- Ken-Royce 7G

=== Kessler ===
- Kessler 200 hp 4.75 in × 5 in (121 mm × 127 mm)
- Kessler 6C-400 5.5 in × 6 in (140 mm × 150 mm)

=== KFM ===
(KFM (Komet Flight Motor) Aircraft Motors Division of Italian American Motor Engineering)

- KFM 107
- KFM 112M

=== Khatchaturov ===
- Khatchaturov R-35

=== KHD ===
- Humboldt-Deutz 6 cyl. in-line diesel
- Klöckner-Humboldt-Deutz diesel 8 cyl. rotary DZ 700?
- Klöckner-Humboldt-Deutz DZ 700
- Klöckner-Humboldt-Deutz DZ 710 16-cylinder horizontally opposed diesel
- Klöckner-Humboldt-Deutz DZ 720 32-cylinder H-block version of the 710
- KHD T112 (APU)
- KHD T117
- KHD T216
- KHD T312
- KHD T317
- Klöckner-Humboldt-Deutz T53-L-13A

=== Kiekhaefer ===
- Kiekhaefer O-45
- Kiekhaefer V-105

=== Kimball ===
- Kimball Beetle K
- Kimball Gnat M

=== King ===
(Chas. B. King)

- King 550 hp V-12 5.5 in × 7 in (140 mm × 180 mm)

=== King-Bugatti ===
- King-Bugatti U-16

=== Kinner ===
Source:Gunston except where noted

- Kinner 60 hp
- Kinner B-5
- Kinner B-54
- Kinner C-5
- Kinner C-7
- Kinner SC-7
- Kinner K-5
- Kinner O-550
- Kinner O-552
- Kinner R-5
- Kinner R-53
- Kinner R-55
- Kinner R-56
- Kinner R-370
- Kinner R-440
- Kinner R-540
- Kinner R-720
- Kinner R-1045-2

=== Kirkham ===
- Kirkham 50 hp 4IL (C-4?) 4.3125 in × 5.125 in (109.54 mm × 130.18 mm)
- Kirkham 75-85 hp
- Kirkham 110 hp
- Kirkham 180 hp 9-cyl. radial
- Kirkham B-4 4.125 in × 4.75 in (104.8 mm × 120.7 mm)
- Kirkham B-6 4.125 in × 4.75 in (104.8 mm × 120.7 mm)
- Kirkham B-12
- Kirkham BG-6 (geared) 4.3125 in × 5.125 in (109.54 mm × 130.18 mm)
- Kirkham C-4
- Kirkham K-12

=== Kishi ===
- Kishi 70 hp V-8 96 mm × 120 mm (3.8 in × 4.7 in)

=== Klimov ===
Source:Gunston

- Klimov M-100
- Klimov M-103
- Klimov M-105
- Klimov VK-106
- Klimov VK-107
- Klimov VK-108
- Klimov VK-109
- Klimov M-120
- Klimov RD-33
- Klimov RD-45
- Klimov RD-500
- Klimov VK-1
- Klimov VK-2
- Klimov VK-3
- Klimov VK-5
- Klimov VK-2500
- Klimov VK-800
- Klimov TV2-117
- Klimov TV3-117
- Klimov TV7-117

=== Knox ===
(Knox Motors Company, Springfield Mass.)

- Knox 300 hp V-12 4.75 in × 7 in (121 mm × 178 mm)
- Knox H-106
- Knox R-266

=== Koerting ===
- Koerting 65 hp V-8 116 mm × 126 mm (4.6 in × 5.0 in)
- Koerting 185 hp V-8 110 mm × 140 mm (4.3 in × 5.5 in)
- Koerting 250 hp V-12 120 mm × 140 mm (4.7 in × 5.5 in)

=== Kosoku ===
(Kosokudo Kikan KK)

- Kosoku KO-4

=== Kolesov ===
- Kolesov RD-36-51
- Kolesov VD-7

=== Köller ===
(Dr. Kröber und Sohn GmbH, Treuenbrietzen)

- Köller M3

=== König ===
(Compact Radial Engines)

- König SC 430
- König SD 570

=== Konrad ===
(Oberbayische Forschungsanhalt Dr. Konrad)

- Konrad 109-613
- Konrad Enzian IV rakatenmotor
- Konrad Enzian V rakatenmotor
- Konrad Rheintochter R 3 rakatenmotor

=== Körting ===
- Körting Kg IV V-8
- Körting 8 SL

=== Kossov ===
- Kossov MG-31F

=== Kostovich ===
(O.S. Kostovich)

- Kostovich 2-cyl airship engine
- Kostovich 80 hp 8-cyl airship engine

=== Krautter ===
(Dipl. Ing. Willi Krautter)

- Krautter-Leichtflugmotor

=== Kroeber ===
(Doktor Kroeber & Sohn G.m.b.H.)

- Kroeber M4

=== Kruk ===
- Kruk rotary 130 mm × 130 mm (5.1 in × 5.1 in)

=== Kuznetsov ===
Source:Gunston except where noted

- Kuznetsov Type 022
- Kuznetsov NK-2
- Kuznetsov NK-4
- Kuznetsov NK-6
- Kuznetsov NK-8
- Kuznetsov NK-12
- Kuznetsov NK-22
- Kuznetsov NK-25
- Kuznetsov NK-32
- Kuznetsov NK-86
- Kuznetsov NK-87
- Kuznetsov NK-88
- Kuznetsov NK-89
- Kuznetsov NK-144
- Kuznetsov TV-2
- Kuznetsov 2TV-2F

== L ==
=== L'Aisle Volante ===
- L'Aisle Volante C.C.4

=== Labor ===
- Labor 70 hp 4-cyl in-line 100 mm × 210 mm (3.9 in × 8.3 in)

=== Lambert Engine Division ===
(Monocoupe Corporation – Lambert Engine Division)

- Lambert M-5
- Lambert R-266
- Lambert R-270

=== Lamplough ===
- Lamplough 6-cyl 2-stroke rotary 116 mm × 126 mm (4.6 in × 5.0 in)
- Lamplough 6-cyl 2-stroke axial

=== Lancia ===
(Lancia & Company. / Vincenzo Lancia)

- Lancia Tipo 4
- Lancia Tipo 5

=== Lange ===
- Lange EA 42

=== Laviator ===
- Laviator 35 hp 3-cyl rotary 2-stroke 110 mm × 100 mm (4.3 in × 3.9 in)
- Laviator 50 hp 6-cyl rotary 2-stroke 100 mm × 130 mm (3.9 in × 5.1 in)
- Laviator 65 hp 6-cyl rotary 2-stroke 100 mm × 130 mm (3.9 in × 5.1 in)
- Laviator 75 hp 9-cyl rotary 2-stroke 100 mm × 130 mm (3.9 in × 5.1 in)
- Laviator 100 hp 12-cyl rotary 2-stroke 100 mm × 130 mm (3.9 in × 5.1 in)
- Laviator 80 hp 6-cyl 2-stroke water-cooled radial 100 mm × 130 mm (3.9 in × 5.1 in)
- Laviator 120 hp 4IL 145 mm × 174 mm (5.7 in × 6.9 in)
- Laviator 110 hp 6IL 130 mm × 160 mm (5.1 in × 6.3 in)
- Laviator 250 hp 6IL 180 mm × 200 mm (7.1 in × 7.9 in)
- Laviator 80 hp V-8 100 mm × 130 mm (3.9 in × 5.1 in)
- Laviator 120 hp V-8 114 mm × 160 mm (4.5 in × 6.3 in)
- Laviator 200 hp V-8 145 mm × 175 mm (5.7 in × 6.9 in)

=== Lawrance ===
- Lawrance A-3
- Lawrance B 60 hp 3-cyl.
- Lawrance C-2
- Lawrance J-1
- Lawrance J-2
- Lawrance L-2 65 hp 4.25 in × 5.25 in (108 mm × 133 mm)
- Lawrance L-3
- Lawrance L-4 a.k.a. 'Wright Gale'
- Lawrance L-5
- Lawrance L-64
- Lawrance N
- Lawrance N-2 40HP 2OA 4.25 in × 4.25 in (108 mm × 108 mm)
- Lawrance R
- Lawrance R-1
- Lawrance-Moulton A (France)
- Lawrance-Moulton B (200 hp V-8 USA) 4.75 in × 6.5 in (121 mm × 165 mm)
- Lawrance 140 hp 9-cyl radial 4.25 in × 5.25 in (108 mm × 133 mm)
- Lawrance 200 hp 9-cyl radial 4.5 in × 5.5 in (110 mm × 140 mm)

=== Lawrence Radiation Laboratory ===
- Tory IIA (Project Pluto)
- Tory IIC (Project Pluto)

=== Le Gaucear ===
- Le Gaucear 150 hp 10-cyl rotary

=== Le Maitre et Gerard ===
- Le Maitre et Gerard 700 hp V-8 180 mm × 210 mm (7.1 in × 8.3 in)

=== Le Rhône ===
- Le Rhône 7A
- Le Rhône 7B
- Le Rhône 7B2
- Le Rhône 7Z
- Le Rhône 9C
- Le Rhône 9J
- Le Rhône 9R
- Le Rhône 9Z
- Le Rhône 11F
- Le Rhône 14D
- Le Rhône 18E (1912)
- Le Rhône 18E (1917)
- Le Rhône 28E
- Le Rhône K
- Le Rhône L
- Le Rhône M
- Le Rhône P
- Le Rhône R

=== LeBlond ===
LeBlond was sold to Rearwin and engines continued under Ken-Royce name.

- LeBlond B-4
- LeBlond B-8
- LeBlond 40-3
- LeBlond 60-5D
- LeBlond 70-5DE
- LeBlond 75-5
- LeBlond 80-5
- LeBlond 85-5DF
- LeBlond 70-5E
- LeBlond 80-5F (in military use known as R-265)
- LeBlond 85-5DF
- LeBlond 90-5F
- LeBlond 90-5G
- LeBlond 90-7
- LeBlond 110-7
- LeBlond 120-7
- LeBlond 7D
- LeBlond 7DF

=== Lee ===
- Lee 80 hp

=== Lefèrve ===
(F. Lefèrve)

- Lefèrve 2-cyl. 33 hp

=== Lenape ===
- Lenape AR-3
- Lenape LM-3 Papoose 3-cyl.
- Lenape LM-5 Brave 5-cyl.
- Lenape LM-7 Chief 7-cyl.
- Lenape LM-125 Brave (suspect should be LM-5-125)
- Lenape LM-365 Papoose (suspect should be LM-3-65)
- Lenape LM-375 Papoose (suspect should be LM-3-75)

=== Lessner ===
- Lessner 1908 4-cyl airship engine

=== Levavasseur ===
Léon Levavasseur see Antoinette

=== Levi ===
- Levi 7-cyl barrel engine

=== Leyland Motors ===
J. G. Parry-Thomas, the chief engineer at Leyland Motors.

- A single X-8 engine was built in August 1918 but failed during testing and with the end of WWI development was abandoned.

=== LFW ===
- LFW 0
- LFW I
- LFW II
- LFW III
- LFW-12 X-1

=== LHTEC ===
- LHTEC T800

=== Liberty ===
Source:Gunston except where noted

- Liberty L-4
- Liberty L-6
- Liberty L-8
- Liberty L-12
- Liberty L-12 double-crankshaft
- Liberty X-24

=== Ligez ===
- Ligez 3-cyl rotary 115 mm × 130 mm (4.5 in × 5.1 in)

=== Light ===
- Light Kitten 20
- Light Kitten 30
- Light Tiger 100
- Light Tiger 125
- Light Tiger Junior 50

=== Lilloise ===
See:C.L.M.

=== Limbach ===
- Limbach L1700
- Limbach L2000
- Limbach L2400
- Limbach L275E
- Limbach L550E

=== Lincoln ===
- Rocket 29 hp

=== Lindequist ===
(Konsortiert Överingeniör Sven Lindequist's Uppfinninggar – Consortium Senior Engineer Sven Lindqvist Inventions)

- Lindewqiuist 1,000 hp Stratospheric engine

=== Les Long Long Harlequin ===
- Long Harlequin 933

=== Lockheed ===
- Lockheed XJ37/L-1000

=== LOM ===
(Letecke Opravny Malesice, Praha)

- LOM M132
- LOM M137
- LOM M337

=== Loravia ===
(Yutz, France)

- Loravia LOR 75

=== Lorraine-Dietrich ===
(Société Lorraine des Anciens Établissements de Dietrich) Source:Jane's All the World's Aircraft 1938 except where noted

- Lorraine 3B licence-built Potez 3B?
- Lorraine 3D licence-built Potez 3B
- Lorraine 5P Ecole – 5 cyl radial
- Lorraine 6A – (AM) 110 hp
- Lorraine 6Ba – 6 cyl two-row radial 130CV
- Lorraine 7M Mizar – 7 cyl radial
- Lorraine 8A – V-8
  - Lorraine 8Aa
  - Lorraine 8Ab
  - Lorraine 8Aby
- Lorraine 8B – V-8
  - Lorraine 8Ba
  - Lorraine 8Bb
  - Lorraine 8Bd
  - Lorraine 8Be
  - Lorraine 8BI (inverted?)
- Lorraine 9A
- Lorraine 9N Algol – Type 120 9 cyl radial
- Lorraine Dietrich 12Cc ? Dc in error?
- Lorraine 12? Hibis 450 hp
- Lorraine 12D
- Lorraine 12 DOO 460 hp O-12
- Lorraine 12E Courlis – W-12 450 hp
- Lorraine 12F Courlis – W-12 600 hp
- Lorraine 12H Pétrel – V-12
- Lorraine 12Q Eider
  - Lorraine 12Qo Eider
- Lorraine 12R Sterna – V-12 Type 111 700 hp
- Lorraine 12Rs Sterna – V-12 Type 111 700 hp
- Lorraine 12Rcr Radium – inverted V-12 with turbochargers 2,000 hp
- Lorraine 14A Antarès – 14 cylinder radial 500 hp
- Lorraine 14E – 14 cylinder radial 470 hp
- Lorraine 18F Sirius – Type 112
  - Lorraine 18F.0 Sirius
  - Lorraine 18F.00 Sirius
  - Lorraine 18F.100 Sirius
- Lorraine 18G Orion – W-18
  - Lorraine 18Ga Orion – W-18
  - Lorraine 18Gad Orion – W-18
- Lorraine 18K – W-18
  - Lorraine 18Ka
  - Lorraine 18Kd
  - Lorraine 18Kdrs
- Lorraine 24 – W-24 1,000 hp (3 banks of 8 cylinders)
- Lorraine 24E Taurus – 24 cyl in-line radial (six banks of 4-inline?) 1,600 hp
- Lorraine P5
- Lorraine AM (moteur d'Aviation Militaire (A.M.)) – derived from German 6-cyl in-line engines
- Lorraine Algol Junior – 230 hp
- Lorraine-Latécoère 8B
- Lorraine Diesel – built in 1932, rated at 200 hp
- Lorraine DM-400

=== Lotarev ===
(Vladimir Lotarev) (see also Ivchenko-Progress)

- Lotarev D-36
- Lotarev D-136
- Lotarev D-236-T
- Lotarev DV-2
- Lotarev RD-36 (lift turbofan)

=== Loughead ===
- Loughead XL-1

=== LPC ===
- LPC Fang 1-KS-40
- LPC Sword 3.81-KS-4090
- LPC Meteor 33-KS-2800
- LPC Mercury 0.765-KS-53,600
- LPC Viper I-C 5.6-KS-5,400
- LPC Viper II-C 3.77-KS-8,040
- LPC Lance I-C 6.65-KS-38,800

=== LSA-Engines ===
(LSA-Engines GmbH, Berlin, Germany)

- LSA-Engines LSA850

=== Lucas ===
- Lucas CT 3201

=== Lutetia ===
(Marcel Echard / Moteurs Lutetia)

- Lutetia 4.C.02 V-4, 2-stroke, 1267 cc, 40-45 hp at 2800rpm
- Lutetia 6-cyl radial 70 hp a 2600 rpm

=== Lycoming ===
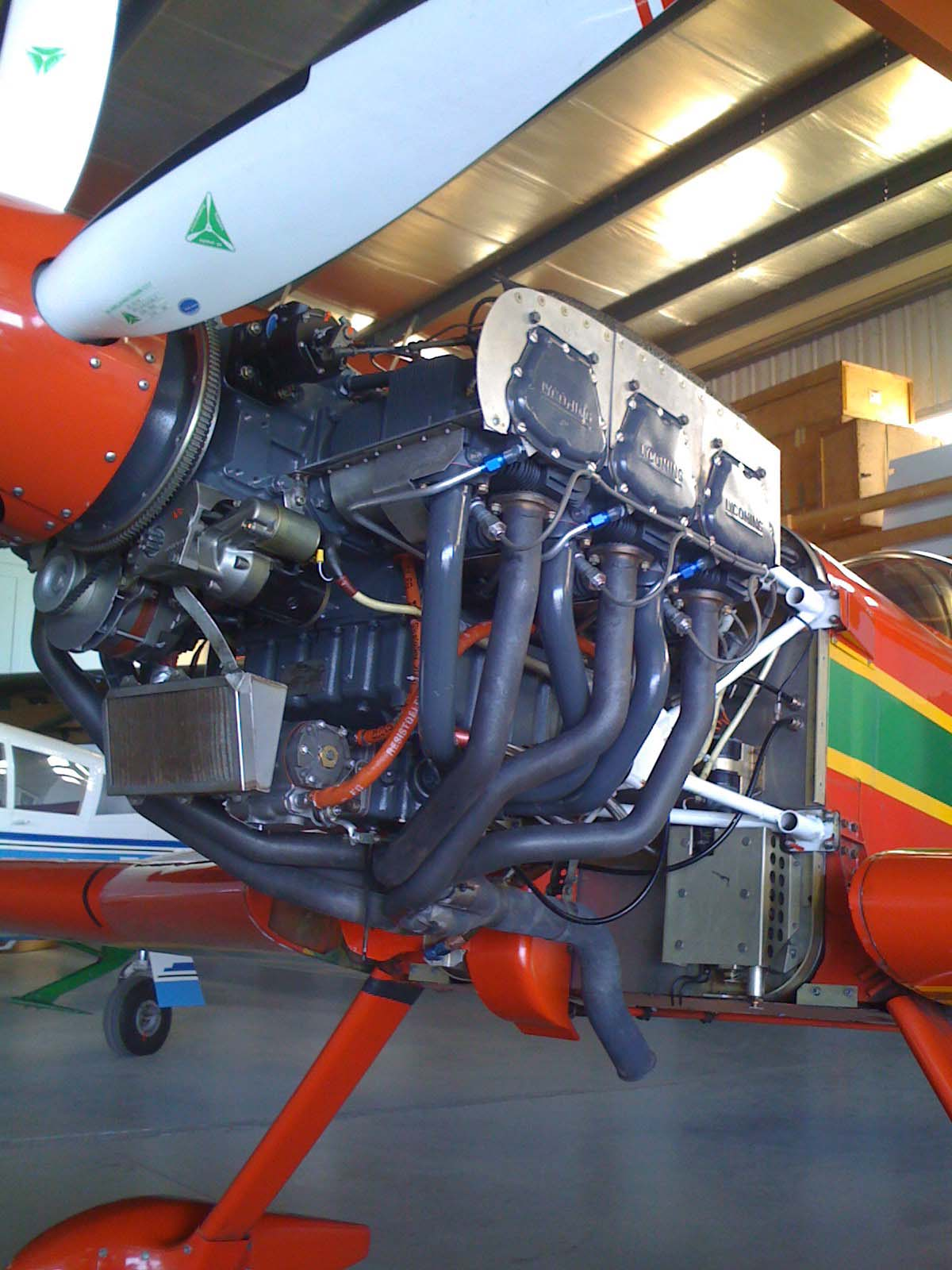
Lycoming O-540

- Lycoming O-145
- Lycoming O-160
- Lycoming O-233
- Lycoming IO-233
- Lycoming O-235
- Lycoming O-290
- Lycoming O-320
- Lycoming O-340
- Lycoming O-350
- Lycoming O-360
- Lycoming IO-390
- Lycoming O-435
- Lycoming O-480
- Lycoming O-530
- Lycoming O-540
- Lycoming O-541
- Lycoming IO-580
- Lycoming GSO-580
- Lycoming SO-590
- Lycoming IO-720
- Lycoming O-1230
- Lycoming R-500
- Lycoming R-530
- Lycoming R-645
- Lycoming R-680
- Lycoming H-2470
- Lycoming XR-7755 (36cyl 7,755ci)
- Lycoming AGT1500
- Lycoming AL55
- Lycoming ALF101
- Lycoming ALF502
- Lycoming LF507
- Lycoming LTC1
- Lycoming LTC4
- Lycoming LTP101
- Lycoming LTS101
- Lycoming PLF1A
- Lycoming PLF1B
- Lycoming F102 (ALF502)
- Lycoming F106 (ALF502)
- Lycoming F408 (Teledyne CAE 382)
- Lycoming J402 (Teledyne CAE 370/372/373)
- Lycoming T702 (PLT27)
- Lycoming T53
- Lycoming T55
- Lycoming TF40

=== Lyulka ===
Source:Gunston.

- Lyulka TR-1
- Lyulka AL-5
- Lyulka AL-7
- Lyulka AL-21
- Lyulka AL-31
- Lyulka AL-34
- Lyulka TS-31M

=== LZ Design ===
- Front electric sustainer

== M ==
=== M&D Flugzeugbau ===
- M&D Flugzeugbau TJ-42

=== MAB ===
- 4-cylinder air-cooled "fan" engine
- 4-cylinder vertical water-cooled in-line engine

=== MacClatchie ===
- MacClatchie X-2 Panther

=== Macchi ===
- Macchi MB.2 – 2.cyl 20 hp at 3,000 rpm

=== Macomber Avis ===
Macomber Rotary Engine Company with Avis Engine Company

- Macomber Avis 7-cylinder axial engine

=== M.A.N. ===
Maschinenfabrik Augsburg-Nürnberg (MAN)

- Licence-built Argus As III
- MAN Mana V (350 hp V-10) V-10 airship engine?
- MAN Mana III (185 hp 6-cyl in-line)
- 260 hp 6-cylinder in-line – "quite similar to 160-hp Mercedes design"

=== MAN Turbo ===
- MAN Turbo 6012
- MAN Turbo 6022
- Rolls-Royce/MAN Turbo RB153
- Rolls-Royce/MAN Turbo RB193

=== Manfred Weiss ===
See: Weiss

=== Manly ===
Charles M. Manly redesigned an engine built by Stephen Balzer.

- Manly–Balzer engine

=== Mantovani ===
- Mantovani Citroën 2CV car engine conversion

=== Marchetti ===
(Marchetti Motor Patents)

- Marchetti A

=== Mark ===
(Stahlwerk Mark Flugzeugbau)

- Mark F.II (35 hp)
- Mark M.3 (40 hp)
- Mark M.5 (70 hp)
- Mark 55 hp
- Mark 120 hp

=== Marcmotor ===
(Macerata, Italy)

- Marcmotor ROS100
- Marcmotor ROS125
- Marcmotor ROS200

=== Marlin-Rockwell ===
- Marlin-Rockwell 72 hp

=== Marquardt Corporation ===
- Marquardt PJ40 pulsejet
- Marquardt PJ46 pulsejet
- Marquardt RJ30 C-20 ramjet
- Marquardt RJ31 C-30 Ramjet
- Marquardt RJ34 ramjet
- Marquardt RJ39 ramjet
- Marquardt RJ43
- Marquardt RJ57 ramjet
- Marquardt RJ59 ramjet
- Marquardt MA-19
- Marquardt MA-20
- Marquardt MA-24
- Marquardt MA-74
- Marquardt MA-196
- Marquardt C-20 (2x C-20s fitted to P-51 and 2x Marquardt C20-85D fitted to P-80A 44-85042)
- Marquardt C-30 (2x Marquardt C30-10B fitted to P-80A 44-85214)
- Marquardt C-48
- Marquardt R-1E
- Marquardt R-40A

=== Martin ===
- Martin 133? typo?
- Martin 333
- Martin 500
- Martin 8200 (190 hp V-8) 4.625 in × 7 in (117.5 mm × 177.8 mm)
- Martin L-330

=== Maru ===
- Maru Ka10

=== Masson ===
- Masson 50 hp 6-cyl in-line

=== Mathis ===
- Mathis G.2F
- Mathis G.4
- Mathis G.4F
- Mathis G.4R
- Mathis G.7
- Mathis G.7R
- Mathis G.8
- Mathis G.8R
- Mathis G.14R
- Mathis G.14RS
- Mathis G.16R
- Mathis Vega 42
- Mathis Vesta 42
- Mathis 175H
- Mathis 2.G.60
- Mathis 4.G.60
- Mathis 4.GB.60
- Mathis 4.GB.62
- Mathis BG-20
- Mathis 12.GS.DS
- Mathis 16.GB.21

=== Mawen ===
(Mawen S.A.)

- Mawen 150 hp rotary
- Mawen 350 hp rotary
- Mawen 700 hp two row rotary

=== Max Ams ===
(Max Ams machine Company)

- Max Ams 75 hp V-8 3.9375 in × 5.125 in (100.01 mm × 130.18 mm)

=== Maxim ===
- Maxim 87 hp 4-cyl in-line 5 in × 5.625 in (127.0 mm × 142.9 mm)

=== Maximotor Makers ===
- Maximotor 50 hp
- Maximotor 60-70 hp
- Maximotor 70-80 hp
- Maximotor 80-100 hp
- Maximotor 100 hp
- Maximotor 120 hp
- Maximotor 150 hp
- Maximotor A-4 (50 hp 4ILW) 4.5 in × 5 in (110 mm × 130 mm)
- Maximotor A-6 (75 hp 6ILW) 4.5 in × 5 in (110 mm × 130 mm)
- Maximotor A-8 (110 hp V-8)5 in × 5.5 in (130 mm × 140 mm)
- Maximotor B-6 (115 6ILW) 5 in × 6 in (130 mm × 150 mm)
- Maximotor 70 hp 4-in-line 5.25 in × 5.5 in (133 mm × 140 mm)

=== Maybach ===
- Maybach AZ
- Maybach DW
- Maybach IR
- Maybach BY
- Maybach CX
- Maybach HS
- Maybach HS D
- Maybach HS-Lu
- Maybach Mb.III
- Maybach Mb.IV
- Maybach Mb.IVa
- Maybach 300 hp
- Maybach VL.I
- Maybach VL.II
- Maybach 180 hp 6IL
- Maybach 200 hp 6IL
- Maybach 300 hp 6IL

=== Mayo ===
(Mayo Radiator Co)

- Mayo 1915 (6LW)

=== McCulloch ===
- McCulloch MAC-101
- McCulloch 104-100
- McCulloch O-90
- McCulloch O-100
- McCulloch O-150
- McCulloch 4318A O-100-1
- McCulloch 4318B O-100-2
- McCulloch 4318C O
- McCulloch 4318E YO-100-4
- McCulloch TSIR-5190
- McCulloch 6150 O-150-1
- McCulloch 6318 O-150-2

=== McDonnell ===
- McDonnell PJ42 pulsejet

=== McDowell ===
(Geo. McDowell. Brooklyn NY.)

- McDowell Twin-Piston V-4 2-stroke

=== Mead ===
(Mead Engine Co.)

- Mead 50 hp 4-cyl in-line 4.75 in × 4.5 in (121 mm × 114 mm)

=== Mekker ===
- Mekker Sport

=== Menasco ===
Sources:Gunston and Jane's.

- Menasco Pirate/Super Pirate
- Menasco Buccaneer/Super Buccaneer
- Menasco M-50
- Menasco Unitwin 2-544
- Menasco-Salmson B-2
- Menasco L-365 – Military designation for Pirate
- Menasco XIV-2040
- Menasco XH-4070
- Menasco RJ37

=== Mengin ===
(Établissements Pierre Mengin)

- Mengin B
- Mengin C (later 2A.01), Poinsard design
- Mengin G.M.H. (Genete, Mengin, and Hochet)
- Mengin 2A.01 Poinsard design
- Hochet-Mengin

=== Mercedes ===
See: Daimler-Benz

=== Merkulov ===
(Ivan A. Merkulov)

- Merkulov DM-4 ramjet

=== Métallurgique ===
Data from:

- Métallurgique 32 hp 4-cyl in-line 100 mm × 150 mm (3.94 in × 5.91 in)
- Métallurgique 40 hp 4-cyl in-line 85 mm × 130 mm (3.35 in × 5.12 in)
- Métallurgique 48 hp 4-cyl in-line 125 mm × 150 mm (4.92 in × 5.91 in)
- Métallurgique 60 hp 4-cyl in-line 100 mm × 150 mm (3.94 in × 5.91 in)
- Métallurgique 90 hp 4-cyl in-line 125 mm × 150 mm (4.92 in × 5.91 in)

=== Meteormotor ===
- Meteormotor 20-25 hp

=== Meteor ===
(Meteor S.p.A. Constuzioni Aeronautiche)

- Meteor G 80cc
- Meteor Alfa 1
- Meteor Alfa 1AQ
- Meteor Alfa 2
- Meteor Alfa 2AQ
- Meteor Alfa 2V
- Meteor Alfa 3
- Meteor Alfa 3AQ
- Meteor Alfa 4
- Meteor Alfa 4V
- Meteor Alfa 5

=== Metropolitan-Vickers ===
- Metrovick F.1
- Metrovick F.2 Freda
- Metrovick F.2/2
- Metrovick F.2/3
- Metrovick F.2/4 Beryl
- Metrovick F.3
- Metrovick F.5
- Metrovick F.9 Sapphire

=== Metz ===
(Metz Company, Waltham, Mass.)

- Metz 125 hp rotary 6.75 in × 6.75 in (171 mm × 171 mm)

=== Michel ===
- Michel IV-AT3
- Michel 4A-14
- Michel RAT-3 100 hp
- Michel A.M. 14 MARK II
- Michel A.M.7 6L 200 hp
- Michel A.M.14 Type I 4L 100 hp
- Michel A.M.14 Type II
- Michel A.M.14 Type III
- Michel A.M.16 6L 40 hp

=== Michigan ===
- Michigan 2-cyl 2-stroke rotary 5 in × 5 in (130 mm × 130 mm)
- Michigan Rover

=== Microturbo ===
- Microturbo TRB 13
- Microturbo SG 18
- Microturbo TRS 18
- Microturbo TRB 19
- Microturbo TRS 25
- Microturbo TRI-40
- Microturbo TRI 60
- Microturbo TFA 66
- Microturbo TRI 80
- Microturbo TFA 130
- Microturbo J403
- Microturbo Cougar
- Microturbo Eclair
- Microturbo Eclair II
- Microturbo Lynx
- Microturbo Noelle
- Microturbo Emeraude
- Microturbo Espadon
- Microturbo Saphir 007

=== Mid-west ===
(Mid-West Engines Limited / Diamond engines / Austro Engine)

- MidWest AE50
- MidWest AE100
- MidWest AE110
- Austro Engine AE50R
- Austro Engine AE75R

=== Miese ===
Data from:

- Miese 50-60 hp 8-cyl
- Miese 100 hp 8-cyl radial 130 mm × 130 mm (5.1 in × 5.1 in)

=== Mikulin ===
- Mikulin AM-3M
- Mikulin AM-13
- Mikulin AM-34
- Mikulin AM-35
- Mikulin AM-37
- Mikulin AM-38
- Mikulin AM-39
- Mikulin AM-42
- Mikulin M-85
- Mikulin RD-3M
- Mikulin M-17
- Mikulin M-209
- Mikulin AM-TKRD-01

=== Mikulin-Stechkin ===
(A.A. Mikulin & B.S. Stechkin)

- AMBS-1

=== Milwaukee Tank ===
- Milwaukee Tank V-470
- Milwaukee Tank V-502

=== Miller ===
- Miller 22 hp radial

=== Miller ===
(Harry A. Miller Manufacturing Company)

- Miller 125 hp 4-cyl in-line 4 in × 7 in (100 mm × 180 mm)
- Miller V-12 5 in × 6 in (130 mm × 150 mm)

=== Minié ===
Data from: (Établissements Minié, Colombes, Seine, France)

- Minié 4.B0 Horus
- Minié 4.D
- Minié 4.E0 Horus
- Minié 4.E2 Horus

=== Mistral Engines ===
- Mistral G-190
- Mistral G-200
- Mistral G-230-TS
- Mistral G-300
- Mistral G-360-TS
- Mistral K-200
- Mistral K-300

=== Mitsubishi ===
- Mitsubishi Ha-42
- Mitsubishi Ha-43
- Mitsubishi Kasei
- Mitsubishi Kinsei
- Mitsubishi Shinten
- Mitsubishi TS1/MG5
- Mitsubishi Zuisei

=== Modena Avio Engines ===
(Rubiera, Italy)

- MAE 323

=== Monaco ===
(Monaco Motor and Engineering Co. Ltd.)

- Monaco 75 hp
- Monaco 100 hp

=== Monnett ===
Data from:'

- Monnett AeroVee
- Monnett 1600cc E-Vee
- Monnett 1600cc SuperVee
- Monnett 1700cc E-Vee
- Monnett 1700cc SuperVee
- Monnett 1835cc E-Vee
- Monnett 2007cc E-Vee

=== Morehouse ===
- Morehouse 15 hp
- Morehouse 29 hp
- Morehouse M-42
- Morehouse M-80

=== Mors ===
Data from:

- Mors 30 hp V-4 100 mm × 130 mm (3.9 in × 5.1 in)

=== Mosler ===
(Mosler, Inc. of Hendersonville, North Carolina)

- Mosler MM CB-35
- Mosler MM CB-40
- Mosler Red 82X

=== Motor Sich ===
- Motor Sich MS-500V

=== Motorav Industria ===
- Motorav 2.3 V
- Motorav 2.6 R
- Motorav 2.6 V
- Motorav 2.8 R
- Motorav 3.1 R

=== Motorlet ===
- Motorlet M-701
- Motorlet M-601
- Motorlet M-602
- Motorlet M-20
- Motorlet AI-25/Titan/Sirius – see Ivchenko AI-25

=== Mozhaiskiy ===
- Mozhaisky gas fired machine

=== MTH ===
- MTH R 422-CG

=== MTR ===
- MTR MTR390

=== MTU Aero Engines ===
- MTU DB 720F/PTL6
- MTU DB 721/PTL10
- MTU DB 730F/PTL6
- MTU DB 730H/ZTL6
- MTU 6012
- MTU 6022

=== Mudry ===
(Moteurs Mudry-Buchoux)

- Mudry MB-4-80
- Mudry MB-4-90

=== Mulag ===
- Mulag 90/113 hp 6-cyl in-line 110 mm × 170 mm (4.3 in × 6.7 in)

=== Murray-Willat ===
- Murray Ajax
- Murray Atlas
- Murray-Willat 35 hp 6-cyl 2-stroke rotary 75 mm × 90 mm (3.0 in × 3.5 in)
- Murray-Willat 90 hp 6-cyl 2-stroke rotary 100 mm × 130 mm (3.9 in × 5.1 in)

=== MWfly ===
(MWfly srl, Passirana di Rho, Italy)

- MWfly B22
- MWfly B25

== N ==
=== N.A.G. ===
Source:Angle.

- NAG 40 hp 4-cyl in-line
- NAG C.III
- NAG F.1
- NAG F.2
- NAG F.3
- NAG F.4
- NAG Model 301
- NAG 6-cyl 135 hp

=== Nagel ===
- Nagel 444

=== Nagliati ===
- Nagliati V.N.V 160 hp Y-12 120 mm × 130 mm (4.7 in × 5.1 in)
- Nagliati 250 hp 8-cyl twin4 120 mm × 100 mm (4.7 in × 3.9 in)

=== Nakajima ===
- Nakajima Ha5
- Nakajima Ha219
- Nakajima Hikari
- Nakajima Homare
- Nakajima Kotobuki
- Nakajima Mamoru
- Nakajima Sakae

=== NAMI ===
- NAMI A.M.B.20

=== Napier ===
Sources: Piston engines, Lumsden, gas turbine and rocket engines, Gunston.

- Napier Cub
- Napier Culverin
- Napier Cutlass
- Napier Dagger
- Napier E.237 – Submission to the NGTE specification TE 10/56
- Napier Eland
- Napier Gazelle
- Napier Javelin
- Napier Lion
- Napier Lioness
- Napier Naiad
- Napier Nomad
- Napier Scorpion
- Napier Double Scorpion
- Napier Triple Scorpion
- Napier Oryx
- Napier Rapier
- Napier RJTV (Ramjet test Vehicle)
- Napier Sabre
- Napier Sea Lion (marinised Lions)
- Napier N.R.E. 17
- Napier N.R.E. 19
- Napier N.R.J. 1

=== Narkiewicz ===
(Wiktor N. Narkiewicz – production at C.Z.P.S.K. (National)

- Narkiewicz WN-1
- Narkiewicz WN-2
- Narkiewicz WN-3
- Narkiewicz WN-4
- Narkiewicz WN-6
- Narkiewicz WN-6R
- Narkiewicz WN-7
- Narkiewicz WN-7R
- Narkiewicz NP-1
- Narkiewicz 2-cyl.

=== Naskiewicz ===
(Stanislaw Naskiewicz)

- Naskiewicz gas turbine

=== National Aerospace Laboratory of Japan ===
- MITI/NAL FJR710

=== National ===
- National 35

=== N.E.C. ===
(New Engine Co.)

- N.E.C. 1910 2-cyl 2-stroke
- N.E.C. 1910 60 hp 6-cyl 2-stroke
- N.E.C. 40 hp 4-cyl 2-stroke
- N.E.C. 50 hp V-4 2-stroke 94 mm × 114 mm (3.7 in × 4.5 in)
- N.E.C. 90 hp 6-cyl 2-stroke 94 mm × 114 mm (3.7 in × 4.5 in)
- N.E.C. 100 hp 6-cyl 2-stroke(1912)
- N.E.C. 69.6 hp 4-cyl 2-stroke 114 mm × 101 mm (4.5 in × 4.0 in)

=== Nelson ===
- Nelson 60 hp 4-stroke
- Nelson 120 hp 4-stroke
- Nelson 150 hp 4-stroke
- Nelson H-44
- Nelson H-49
- Nelson H-56
- Nelson H-59
- Nelson H-63
- Nelson O-65

=== Nielsen & Winther ===
- Nielsen & Winther M.A.J.

=== Nieuport ===
- Nieuport 28 hp 2-cyl opposed 130 mm × 150 mm (5.1 in × 5.9 in)
- Nieuport 32/35 hp 2-cyl opposed 135 mm × 150 mm (5.3 in × 5.9 in)

=== Nihonnainenki ===
- Nihonnainenki Semi

=== Nippon ===
(Nippon Jet Engine Company)

- Nippon J0-1
- Nippon J0-3
- Nippon J1-1
- Nippon J3-1

=== Noel Penney Turbines ===
- NPT301

=== Nord ===
- Nord ST.600 Sirius I
- Nord ST.600 Sirius II
- Nord ST.600 Sirius III
- Nord Véga

=== Normalair Garrett ===
- NGL WAM 274
- NGL WAM 342

=== Northrop ===
Source:Gunston.

- Northrop Model 4318F
- Northrop O-100
- Northrop Turbodyne XT-37

=== Norton ===
(Kenneth Norton / Norton-Newby Motorcycle Co.)

- Norton 2-cyl opposed 4 in × 4.5 in (100 mm × 110 mm)
- Norton NR642

=== Novus ===
- Novus 70 hp 6-cyl rotary 120 mm × 130 mm (4.7 in × 5.1 in)
- Novus 70 hp 6-cyl double rotary 120 mm × 130 mm (4.7 in × 5.1 in)

=== NPO Saturn ===
- AL-31
- AL-32
- AL-34
- AL-41
- AL-51
- AL-55

=== NPT ===
- NPT100
- NPT109
- NPT151
- NPT301
- NPT301 LTD

=== NST-Machinenbau ===
(Niedergoersdorf, Germany)

- NST BS 650

=== Nuffield ===
- Nuffield 100 hp 4HO

== O ==
=== Oberursel ===
- Oberursel U.0
- Oberursel U.I
- Oberursel U.II
- Oberursel U.III
- Oberursel Ur.II
- Oberursel Ur.III
- Oberursel 200 hp 18-cyl rotary 124 mm × 150 mm (4.9 in × 5.9 in)
- Oberursel 240 hp V-8

=== Oerlikon ===
- Oerlikon 50/60 hp 4-cyl opposed 100 mm × 200 mm (3.9 in × 7.9 in)

=== Oldfield ===
- Oldfield 15A 124 mm × 150 mm (4.9 in × 5.9 in)

=== Omsk ===
- Omsk TVO-100

=== Opel ===
- Opel Argus As III

=== Orenda Engines ===
Orenda Engines, formed by Avro Canada taking over publicly funded jet engine development by Turbo Research. Later became Orenda Aerospace under Magellan.

- Avro Canada Chinook
- Avro Canada Orenda
- Orenda Iroquois
- Orenda OE600
- licence-built General Electric J79
- licence-built General Electric J85

=== Orion ===
- Orion LL-30

=== Orlo ===
(Orlo Motor Company)

- Orlo B-4 4IL 50 hp 4.5 in × 6 in (110 mm × 150 mm)
- Orlo B-6 6IL 75 hp 4.5 in × 6 in (110 mm × 150 mm)
- Orlo B-8 V-8 100 hp 4.5 in × 6 in (110 mm × 150 mm)

=== Orlogsværftet ===
- Orlogsværftet O.V. 160

=== OKL ===
(Ośrodek Konstrukcji Lotniczych WSK Okęcie)

- OKL LIS-2
- OKL LIS-2A
- OKL LIS-5
- OKL LIT-3
- OKL TO-1
- OKL NP-1
- OKL WN-3 (Wiktor Narkiewicz)
- OKL WN-6 (Wiktor Narkiewicz)
- OKL WN-7 (Wiktor Narkiewicz)

=== Otis-Pifre ===
- Otis-Pifre 6-cyl in-line
- Otis-Pifer 500 hp V-12 130 mm × 160 mm (5.1 in × 6.3 in)

=== Otto A.G.O. ===
- Otto A.G.O. 50 hp
- Otto A.G.O. 70 hp
- Otto A.G.O. 80/100 hp
- Otto A.G.O. 100/130 hp
- Otto 200 hp 8 in-line

== P ==
=== Packard ===
Source:Gunston.

- Packard 1A-258 1922 single
- Packard 1A-744 1919 V-8(60) 180 hp 4.75 in × 5.25 in (121 mm × 133 mm)
- Packard 1A-825 1921 V-8(60) 5 in × 5.25 in (127 mm × 133 mm)
- Packard 1A-905 225 hp V-12 4 in × 6 in (100 mm × 150 mm)
- Packard 1A-1100 1917 V-8(45) – small scale production of Liberty L-8
- Packard 1A-1116 1919 V-12(60) 282 hp 4.75 in × 5.25 in (121 mm × 133 mm)
- Packard 1A-1237 1920 V-12(60) 315 hp 5 in × 5.25 in (127 mm × 133 mm)
- Packard 2A-1237 1923 V-12(60)
- Packard 1A-1300 1923 V-12(60)
- Packard 1A-1464 1924 V-12(60) 1st redesign of 1A-1300
- Packard 1A-1500 1924 V-12(60)
  - variants: Packard 2A-1500 1925 V-12(60), Packard 3A-1500 1927 V-12(60)
- Packard 1M-1551 test engine
- Packard 1A-1551 1921 IL-6
- Packard 1A-1650 1919 Packard's post war Liberty
- Packard 1A-2025 1920 V-12(60) 540 hp 5.75 in × 6.5 in (146 mm × 165 mm)
- Packard 1A-2200 1923 V-12(60) (made as 6 cyl.)
- Packard 1A-2500 1924 V-12
  - variants include 2A-2500, 2A-2540, 3A-2500, 4A-2500, 5A-2500, 3M-2500, 4M-2500, 5M-2500
- Packard X-2775 – experimental X-24, three engines built
  - 1A-2775, 2A-2775 (1935)
- Packard 1A-3000 193? H-24 "H" exp.
- Packard 1A-5000 1939 X-24(60) exp.
- Packard 2A-5000 1939 H-24 exp.
- Packard 3A-5000 1939 X-24(90) exp. sleeve valve
- Packard 1D-2270 1952 V-16(TD60)
- Packard DR-980 1928 R-9(D) 1st diesel to fly
- Packard DR-1340 1932 R-9(D) 2-cycle
- Packard DR-1520 1932 R-9(D) 2-cycle
- Packard DR-1655 1932 R-9(D) exp. diesel
- Packard 299 1916 V-12(60) "299" racer engine
- Packard 452 1917 IL-6 aero exp.
- Packard 905-1 1916 V-12(40)
- Packard 905-2 1917 V-12(40)
- Packard 905-3 1917 V-12(40) (1A-905)
- Packard IL-6 (1A-1551)
- Packard L-8 (1A-1100) – licence-built Liberty L-12
- Packard L-12 1917 Liberty L-12 engines
- Packard L-12E 1918 U-12 Duplex – 2 crankshafts
- Packard V-1650 – inverted Liberty L-12
- Packard V-1650 Merlin – licence-built Rolls-Royce Merlin
- Packard W-1 1921 W-18(40) Air Service-designed and Packard-built
- Packard W-1-A 1923 W-18(40) Air Service-designed and Packard-built
- Packard W-1-B 1923 W-18(40) Air Service-designed and Packard-built
- Packard W-2 1923 W-18(40) Air Service designed
- Packard XJ41 1946 Turbo-Jet Experimental turbojet. 7 were contracted
- Packard XJ49 1948 Turbo-Fan Experimental fan jet. Highest thrust—10,000 lbf (44 kN)—jet built up to that time

=== Palmer ===
(Palmer Motor Company)

- Palmer 80 hp

=== Palons & Beuse ===
- Palons & Beuse 2-cyl opposed

=== Panhard & Levassor ===
Source: (Société Panhard & Levassor)

Inline engines

- Panhard & Levassor 4M – Dirigible engine with power outputs of 50 to 120 hp (1905–1911)
- Panhard & Levassor 4I – 35/40 hp (1909)
- Panhard & Levassor 6I – 55 hp (1910)
- Panhard & Levassor 6J – 65 hp (1910)

V8 engines

- Panhard & Levassor V8 – 100 hp (1912)

V12 engines

- Panhard & Levassor 12J – 220 hp (1915)
- Panhard & Levassor 12M – 500 hp (1918)

V12 sleeve valve engines

- Panhard & Levassor VL 12L – 450 hp (1924)
- Panhard & Levassor VK 12L – 450 hp (1925)

W16 engines

- Panhard & Levassor 16W – 650 hp (1920)

=== Parker ===
(Aero Parker Motor Sales Company)

- Parker 1912 3 cyl
- Parker 1912 6 cyl

=== Parma Technik ===
(Luhačovice, Zlín Region, Moravia, Czech Republic)

- Parma Mikron III UL

=== Parodi ===
(Roland Parodi)

- Parodi HP 60Z

=== PBS ===
(První Brnenská Strojírna Velká Bíteš, a.s.)

- PBS TJ-20
- PBS TJ-40
- PBS TJ-100
- PBS Velka Bites ÒÅ 50Â

=== Pegasus Aviation ===
- Pegasus PAL 95

=== Per Il Volo ===
- Per Il Volo Top 80

=== Peterlot ===
- Peterlot 80 hp 7-cyl radial

=== Peugeot ===
- Peugeot 8Aa, or L112, V-8 100 mm × 180 mm (3.9 in × 7.1 in)
- Peugeot Type 16AJ 440 hp double V-8 120 mm × 160 mm (4.7 in × 6.3 in)
- Peugeot L41 600 hp V-12 160 mm × 170 mm (6.3 in × 6.7 in)
- Peugeot Type 16X X-16 130 mm × 170 mm (5.1 in × 6.7 in)
- Peugeot 12L13

=== Pheasant Aircraft Company ===
- Pheasant Flight 4-cyl

=== Phillips ===
(Phillips Aviation Company)

- Phillips 333 (Martin 333)
- Phillips 500

=== Piaggio ===
Data from:Italian Civil & Military Aircraft 1930–1945 and Jane's 1938

- Piaggio P.II (Armstrong Siddeley Lynx)
- Piaggio Stella P.VII
- Piaggio Stella P.IX
- Piaggio P.X
- Piaggio P.XI
- Piaggio P.XII
- Piaggio P.XV
- Piaggio P.XVI
- Piaggio P.XIX
- Piaggio P.XXII
- Piaggio-Jupiter
- Piaggio Lycoming

=== Pierce ===
(Samuel S Pierce Airplane Company)

- Pierce B 35 hp 3RA 4 in × 6 in (100 mm × 150 mm)

=== Pieper ===
(Pieper Motorenbau GmbH)

- Pieper Stamo MS 1500
- Pieper Stamo 1000

=== Pipistrel ===
- Pipistrel E-811

=== Pipe ===
Data from:

- Pipe 50 hp V-8 3.94 in × 3.94 in (100 mm × 100 mm)
- Pipe 110 hp V-8

=== Pirna ===
- Pirna 014

=== Platzer ===
- Platzer MA 12 P/Nissan

=== Pobjoy ===
- Pobjoy P
- Pobjoy R
- Pobjoy Cataract
- Pobjoy Cascade
- Pobjoy Niagara

=== Poinsard ===
- Poinsard 25hp 2-cyl

=== Porsche ===
- Porsche 678
- Porsche 702
- Porsche PFM N00
- Porsche PFM N01
- Porsche PFM N03
- Porsche PFM T03
- Porsche PFM 3200
- Porsche 109-005
- Porsche YO-95-6

=== Potez ===
- Potez A-4 50 hp 4IL upright 100 mm × 120 mm (3.9 in × 4.7 in)
- Potez 1C APU
- Potez 1D APU
  - Potez 1D-3 APU
- Potez 2D APU
  - Potez 2D-2 APU
  - Potez 2D-5 APU
- Potez 2C APU
- Potez 3B
- Potez 4D
- Potez 4E
- Potez 6A
  - Potez 6Aa
  - Potez 6Ab
  - Potez 6Ac
- Potez 6B
  - Potez 6Ba
- Potez 6D
- Potez 6E
  - Potez 6E.30
- Potez 8D
- Potez 9A
  - Potez 9Ab
  - Potez 9Abr
  - Potez 9Ac
- Potez 9B
  - Potez 9Ba
  - Potez 9Bb
  - Potez 9Bd
- Potez 9C
  - Potez 9C-01
- Potez 9E
  - Potez 9Eo
- Potez 12As
- Potez 12D (a.k.a. D.12)
  - Potez 12D-00
  - Potez 12D-01
  - Potez 12D-03
  - Potez 12D-30

=== Pouit ===
- Pouit S-4

=== PowerJet ===
- PowerJet SaM146

=== Power Jets ===
- Power Jets WU
- Power Jets W.1
- Power Jets W.2
- Power Jets/Rover B/23 – Rolls-Royce Welland

=== Poyer ===
(Poyer Aircraft Engine Company)

- Poyer 3-40
- Poyer 3-50

=== Praga ===
Source:Jane's All the World's Aircraft 1938

- Praga B
- Praga B2
- Praga D
- Praga DH
- Praga DR
- Praga ER
- Praga ES
- Praga ESV
- Praga ESVKe
- Praga ESVR
- Praga FRK
- Praga M-197 helicopter engine
- Praga Doris B
- Praga Doris M-208B
- Praga E-I
- Praga BD 500

=== Pratt & Whitney ===
- Pratt & Whitney H-2600 – enlarged X-1800
- Pratt & Whitney X-1800
- Pratt & Whitney XH-3130 – cancelled
- Pratt & Whitney XH-3730 – cancelled
- Pratt & Whitney R-985 Wasp Junior
- Pratt & Whitney R-1340 Wasp
- Pratt & Whitney R-1535 Twin Wasp Junior
- Pratt & Whitney R-1690 Hornet
- Pratt & Whitney R-1830 Twin Wasp
- Pratt & Whitney R-1860 Hornet B
- Pratt & Whitney R-2000 Twin Wasp
- Pratt & Whitney R-2060 Yellow Jacket
- Pratt & Whitney R-2180-A Twin Hornet
- Pratt & Whitney R-2180-E Twin Wasp E
- Pratt & Whitney R-2270
- Pratt & Whitney R-2800 Double Wasp
- Pratt & Whitney R-4360 Wasp Major
- Pratt & Whitney JT3
- Pratt & Whitney JT3C – company designation for J57
- Pratt & Whitney JT3D
- Pratt & Whitney JT4 – company designation for J75
- Pratt & Whitney JT4A – company designation for J75
- Pratt & Whitney JT4D
- Pratt & Whitney JT7
- Pratt & Whitney JT8
- Pratt & Whitney JT8D
- Pratt & Whitney JT9D
- Pratt & Whitney JT10D
- Pratt & Whitney JT11D
- Pratt & Whitney JT12A
- Pratt & Whitney JT18D
- Pratt & Whitney JTF10A – company designation of Pratt & Whitney TF30
- Pratt & Whitney JTF16
- Pratt & Whitney JTF17
- Pratt & Whitney JTF22 – company designation of Pratt & Whitney F100
- Pratt & Whitney JFTD12 – company designation of Pratt & Whitney T73
- Pratt & Whitney JTN9
- Pratt & Whitney PT1 (T32)
- Pratt & Whitney PT2 – company designation of Pratt & Whitney T34
- Pratt & Whitney PT4
- Pratt & Whitney PT5
- Pratt & Whitney PW1000G
- Pratt & Whitney PW1120
- Pratt & Whitney PW1130
- Pratt & Whitney PW2000
- Pratt & Whitney PW3000
- Pratt & Whitney PW3005
- Pratt & Whitney PW4000
- Pratt & Whitney PW6000
- Pratt & Whitney RL-10
- Pratt & Whitney ST9
- Pratt & Whitney STF300
- Pratt & Whitney LR115
- Pratt & Whitney F100
- Pratt & Whitney F105 – US military designation of JT9D
- Pratt & Whitney F117 (PW2037) – military designation of Pratt & Whitney PW2000
- Pratt & Whitney F119 (PW5000)
- Pratt & Whitney F135
- Pratt & Whitney F401 – USN designation for F100
- Pratt & Whitney J42 (licence built Rolls-Royce Nene)
- Pratt & Whitney J48 (licence built Rolls-Royce RB.44 Tay)
- Pratt & Whitney J52 (JT84)
- Pratt & Whitney J57
- Pratt & Whitney J58
- Pratt & Whitney J60 – military designation of JT12
- Pratt & Whitney J75
- Pratt & Whitney J91
- Pratt & Whitney RJ40 Ramjet
- Pratt & Whitney T32 – US military designation of PT1
- Pratt & Whitney T34
- Pratt & Whitney T45
- Pratt & Whitney T48
- Pratt & Whitney T52
- Pratt & Whitney XT57
- Pratt & Whitney T73
- Pratt & Whitney T101 – military designation of Pratt & Whitney Canada PT6-45A)
- Pratt & Whitney T400 – military designation of Pratt & Whitney Canada PT6T
- Pratt & Whitney TF30
- Pratt & Whitney TF33
- Pratt & Whitney / SNECMA TF104, TF106, TF306 -variants of Pratt & Whitney TF30 by SNECMA

=== Pratt & Whitney/Allison ===
- PW-Allison 578DX

=== Pratt & Whitney Canada ===
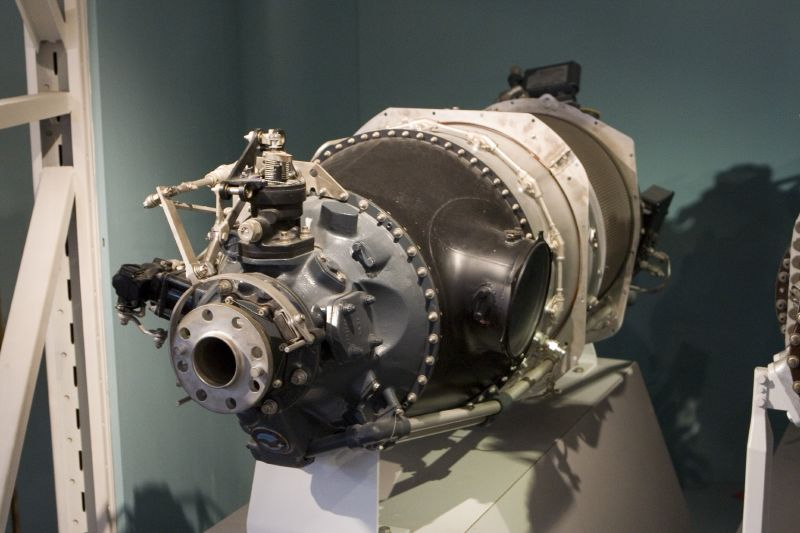
Pratt & Whitney Canada PT6

- Pratt & Whitney Canada PT6
- Pratt & Whitney Canada PT6T
- Pratt & Whitney Canada ST6
- Pratt & Whitney Canada JT15D
- Pratt & Whitney Canada PW100
- Pratt & Whitney Canada PW200
- Pratt & Whitney Canada PW300
- Pratt & Whitney Canada PW500
- Pratt & Whitney Canada PW600
- Pratt & Whitney Canada PW800
- Pratt & Whitney Canada T74
- Pratt & Whitney Canada T101
- Pratt & Whitney Canada T400

=== Pratt & Whitney Rzeszów ===
- Pratt & Whitney Rzeszów PZL-10

=== Preceptor ===
- Preceptor 1/2 VW
- Preceptor 1600cc
- Preceptor Gold 1835
- Preceptor Gold 2074
- Preceptor 2180cc

=== Price Induction ===
- DGEN

=== Primi-Berthand ===
- Primi-Berthand 4-cyl in-line 2-stroke 100 mm × 180 mm (3.9 in × 7.1 in)

=== Pulch ===
(Otto Pulch)

- Pulch 003
- Pulch 3-cyl. radial

=== Pulsar ===
- Pulsar Aeromaxx 100

=== PZI ===
(Państwowe Zakłady Inżynieryjne – National Engineering Works)

- P.Z. Inż. Junior 120 hp
- P.Z. Inż. Major
- P.Z. Inż. Minor

=== PZL ===
(PZL Państwowe Zakłady Lotnicze)

==== PZL Rzeszów ====
(PZL Rzeszów)

- PZL Rzeszów SO-1
- PZL Rzeszów SO-3

==== PZL-Wytwórnia Silników ====
- PZL GR.760
- PZL GR.1620-A
- PZL GR.1620-B
- PZL-3 – Ivchenko AI-26
- PZL-10
- PZL GTD-350 – Klimov GTD-350
- PZL-Kalisz ASz-61R
- PZL ASz-62 – Shvetsov ASh-62
- PZL-F 2A – Franklin 2 series
- PZL-F 4A – licence built Franklin Engine Company
- PZL-F 6A – licence built Franklin Engine Company
- PZL-F 6V – licence built Franklin Engine Company
- PZL-65KM
- PZL K-15

== Q ==
=== Quick Air Motors Co ===
(Quick Air Motors, Wichita KS.)

- Quick Super Rhone – conversion of 80 hp Le Rhône 9C rotary engine to radial.
- Quick 180 hp

== R ==
=== Radne Motor AB ===
- Radne Raket 120

=== Ranger ===
Ranger Engines were a division of Fairchild Aircraft

- Ranger 6-370
- Ranger 6-375
- Ranger 6-390
- Ranger 6-410
- Ranger L-440 (company designation 6-440)
- Ranger V-770
- Ranger V-880
- Ranger XV-920
- Ranger XH-1850 (not actually an H – a double 150° V – two separate crankshafts linked by a gearbox)

=== Rapp ===
Rapp Motorenwerke became BMW in 1917

- Rapp 100 hp
- Rapp 125/145 hp
- Rapp Rp III
- Rapp 200 hp

=== Rasmussen ===
(Hans L Rasmussen)

- Rasmussen 65 hp

=== Rateau ===
- Rateau GTS.65
- Rateau A.65 gas turbine
- Rateau SRA-01 Savoie
- Rateau SRA-101 10-stage axial compressor
- Rateau SRA-301 16-stage axial compressor

=== Rausenberger ===
- Rausenberger A-8 45 hp V-8 3.5 in × 3.75 in (89 mm × 95 mm)
- Rausenberger B-8 75 hp V-8 4.125 in × 4.75 in (104.8 mm × 120.7 mm)
- Rausenberger C-12 150 hp V-12 4.125 in × 6 in (104.8 mm × 152.4 mm)
- Rausenberger D-23 250 hp V-12 5 in × 6.5 in (130 mm × 170 mm)
- Rausenberger E-6 150 hp 6IL 5 in × 6 in (130 mm × 150 mm)
- Rausenberger 500 hp

=== Raven Redrives ===
- Raven 1000 UL
- Raven 1300 SVS Turbo
- Raven 1600 SV

=== RBVZ ===
- RBVZ-6 (M-1)
- MRB-6

=== Reaction Motors ===
- Reaction Motors LR2
- Reaction Motors LR6
- Reaction Motors LR8
- Reaction Motors LR10
- Reaction Motors LR11
- Reaction Motors LR22
- Reaction Motors LR26
- Reaction Motors LR30
- Reaction Motors LR32
- Reaction Motors LR33
- Reaction Motors LR34
- Reaction Motors LR35
- Reaction Motors LR39
- Reaction Motors LR40
- Reaction Motors LR44 Guardian
- Reaction Motors LR48
- Reaction Motors LR99
- Reaction Motors 6000C4
- Reaction Motors ROR
- Reaction Motors Patriot
- Reaction Motors TU205

=== Rearwin ===
- Rearwin 1909 30-45 hp
- Rearwin 1909 40-60 hp
- Rearwin 1910 50-75 hp
- Rearwin 1911 80-90 hp

=== Rebus ===
- Rebus 50 hp 4-cyl

=== Rectimo ===
(Rectimo Aviation SA) / (Rectimo-Savoie Aviation)

- Rectimo 4 AR 1200
- Rectimo 4 AR 1600

=== RED ===
RED Aircraft GmbH

- RED A03 – V12 four-stroke diesel engine

=== Redrup ===
- Redrup 1910 50 hp 10-cyl contra-rotating rotary
- Redrup 1914 150 hp 7-cyl radial
- Redrup 5-cyl barrel engine
- Redrup Fury (barrel engine built by Aero Syndicate Ltd.)

=== Reggiane ===
- Reggiane Re 101 R.C.50 I (sometimes designated Re L 101 R.C.50 I)
- Reggiane Re 102 R.C.50 I (inverted W-18)
- Reggiane Re 103 R.C.40 I (inverted W-18)
- Reggiane Re 103 R.C.50 I (inverted W-18)
- Reggiane Re 103 R.C.57 I (inverted W-18)
- Reggiane Re 103 R.C.48 (inverted W-18)
- Reggiane Re 104 R.C.38 (V-12 derived from the Isotta Fraschini Asso L.121 R.C.40)
- Reggiane Re 105 R.C.100 I (inverted W-18)
- Reggiane H-24

=== Régnier ===
- Régnier R1
- Régnier 2
- Régnier 4B (derived from de Havilland Gipsy)
- Régnier 4D.2
- Régnier 4E.0
- Régnier 4F.0
- Régnier 4JO
- Régnier 4KO
- Régnier 4LO
- Régnier 4L
- Régnier 4R
- Régnier 6B
- Régnier 6C
- Régnier 6GO
- Régnier 6R
- Régnier 6RS
- Régnier R161-01
- Régnier Martinet
- Régnier 12Hoo

=== Renard ===
(Société anonyme des avions et moteurs Renard / Alfred Renard, Belgium)

- Renard Type 7 7RA
- Renard Type 100 5RA
- Renard Type 120 5RA
- Renard Type 200 9RA
- Renard Type 400 18RA (twin-row type 200)

=== Renard ===
- Renard y Krebs

=== Renault ===
Source: Hartmann except where noted.

- Renault 50/60 hp, 8A & 8Aa, air-cooled V-8
- Renault 70 hp, 8Ab & 8C, type WB/WC, air-cooled V-8
- Renault 35/40 hp, 4A, water-cooled I-4
- Renault 25/30 hp, 4B, air-cooled I-4
- Renault 30 hp, 8B, air cooled V-8, reduced 70mm bore
- Renault 75 hp, type WX, air-cooled V-8
- Renault 80 hp, 8Ca, type WS, air-cooled V-8
- Renault 90 hp, 12A, air-cooled V-12
- Renault 100 hp, 12B, air-cooled V12
- Renault 110 hp, 12Da, air-cooled V-12
- Renault 120 hp, 12Db, air-cooled V-12
- Renault 130 hp, 12Dc, air-cooled V-12
- Renault 8G 14.7 L (900 cu in) 50 deg V-8 series
  - Renault 8G 140 hp (100 kW)
  - Renault 8Ga 150 hp (110 kW)
  - Renault 8Gb 160 hp (120 kW)
  - Renault 8Gc 175 hp (130 kW)
  - Renault 8Gd 190 hp (140 kW)
    - Renault 8Gdy 200 hp (150 kW)
  - Renault 8Ge 200 hp (150 kW)
- Renault 12E 18 L (1,100 cu in) 50 deg V-12 series
  - Renault 12Eb 220 hp (160 kW)
  - Renault 12Ec 235 hp (175 kW)
- Renault 12F 22 L (1,300 cu in) 50 deg V-12 series
  - Renault 12Fa 220 hp (160 kW)
  - Renault 12Fb 250 hp (190 kW)
  - Renault 12Fc 280 hp (210 kW)
    - Renault 12Fcx
    - Renault 12Fcy
  - Renault 12Fe 300 hp (220 kW)
  - Renault 12Ff 350 hp (260 kW)
- Renault 12G 330 hp (250 kW) 50 deg V-12
- Renault 12H 30.46 L (1,859 cu in) 50 deg V-12 series
  - Renault 12Ha 450 hp (340 kW)
  - Renault 12Hd 480 hp (360 kW)
  - Renault 12He 500 hp (370 kW)
  - Renault 12Hg 550 hp (410 kW)
- Renault 12J 43.4 L (2,650 cu in) 60 deg V-12 series
  - Renault 12Ja 450 hp (340 kW)
  - Renault 12Jb 500 hp (370 kW)
  - Renault 12Jc 550 hp (410 kW)
- Renault 12K 43.4 L (2,650 cu in) 50 deg V-12 series
  - Renault 12Ka 450 hp (340 kW)
  - Renault 12Kb 450 hp (340 kW)
  - Renault 12Kd 480 hp (360 kW)
  - Renault 12Ke 500 hp (370 kW)
  - Renault 12Kg 550 hp (410 kW)
- Renault 12M V-12 series
  - Renault 12M 550 hp (410 kW) 37.17 L (2,268 cu in)
  - Renault 12Mc 830 hp (620 kW) 43.46 L (2,652 cu in)
  - Renault 12Md 850 hp (630 kW) 43.46 L (2,652 cu in)
- Renault 4P 6.33 L (386 cu in) I-4 series (Bengali 4)
  - Renault 4Ps
  - Renault 4Pa
  - Renault 4Pb
  - Renault 4Pbi
  - Renault 4Pc
  - Renault 4Pci
  - Renault 4Pde
  - Renault 4Pdi
  - Renault 4Pei
  - Renault 4Pfi
  - Renault 4Pgi
  - Renault 4Po
  - Renault 4Poi
  - Renault 4P-01
  - Renault 4P-03
  - Renault 4P-05
  - Renault 4P-07
- Renault 6P 9.5 L (580 cu in) inverted I-6 series - (Bengali 6 early models)
  - Renault 6Pdi
  - Renault 6Pdis
  - Renault 6Pfi
  - Renault 438 (1934 Coupe Deutsch) 180 hp (130 kW)
- Renault 9C 20.7 L (1,260 cu in) 9-cylinder radial series
  - Renaut 9C 320 hp (240 kW)
  - Renault 9Ca 350 hp (260 kW)
- Renault 7A 100 hp (75 kW) 7-cylinder radial
- Renault 7B 100 hp (75 kW) 7-cylinder radial (short stroke version of the 7A)
- Renault 12Ncr 2,000 hp (1,500 kW) (1931 Coupe Schneider)
- Renault 18Jbr 700 hp (520 kW) W-18
- Renault 9Pa 250 hp (190 kW) 9-cylinder radial
- Renault 6Q 9.5 L (580 cu in) inverted I-6 series (Bengali 6 late models)
  - Renault 6Q-00/01
  - Renault 6Q-02/03
  - Renault 6Q-04/05
  - Renault 6Q-06/07
  - Renault 6Q-08/09
  - Renault 6Q-10/11
  - Renault 6Q-18/19
  - Renault 6Q-20/21
- Renault 9F 29.15 L (1,779 cu in) 9-cylinder radial series
  - Renault 9Fas 600 hp (450 kW)
  - Renault 9Fasr 680 hp (510 kW) - geared version of the 9Fas
- Renault 14F 45.34 L (2,767 cu in) 14-cylinder twin row radial
  - Renault 14Fas 1,000 hp (750 kW).
  - Renault 14Fasr 1,020 hp (760 kW) - geared version of the 14Fas
- Renault 12R 19 L (1,200 cu in) air-cooled inverted V-12 series
  - Renault 12R 450 hp (340 kW)
  - Renault 12Rb 470–480 hp (350–360 kW)
  - Renault 12Rc 500 hp (370 kW)
  - Renault 12Rm 480 hp (360 kW)
  - Renault 12Ro 450 hp (340 kW)
  - Renault 12R-00 500 hp (370 kW)
  - Renault 12R-01 500 hp (370 kW)
  - Renault 12R-03 500 hp (370 kW)
  - Renault 12R-09 500 hp (370 kW)
  - Renault 12R Special 730 hp (540 kW)
- Renault 14T 45.34 L (2,767 cu in) 14-cylinder twin row radial
  - Renault 14T.01 1,020 hp (760 kW) - Direct drive. Clockwise rotation.
  - Renault 14T.02 1,020 hp (760 kW) - Direct drive. Counterclockwise rotation.
  - Renault 14T.03 1,000 hp (750 kW) - Geared. Clockwise rotation.
  - Renault 14T.04 1,000 hp (750 kW) - Geared. Counterclockwise rotation.
- Renault 12Drs 519 hp (387 kW) V-12

=== R.E.P. ===
- R.E.P. 20/24 hp 5-cyl. 85 mm × 95 mm (3.35 in × 3.74 in)
- R.E.P. 30/34 hp 7-cyl. 85 mm × 95 mm (3.35 in × 3.74 in)
- R.E.P. 95 hp 7-cyl. 110 mm × 160 mm (4.33 in × 6.3 in)
- R.E.P. 40/48 hp 10-cyl. 85 mm × 95 mm (3.35 in × 3.74 in)
- R.E.P. 60 hp 14-cyl. 85 mm × 95 mm (3.35 in × 3.74 in)
- R.E.P. 60 hp 5-cyl fan 110 mm × 160 mm (4.3 in × 6.3 in)
- R.E.P. 50 hp 5-cyl fan 100 mm × 140 mm (3.9 in × 5.5 in)
- R.E.P. 75 hp 6-cyl
- R.E.P. 60 hp 7-cyl
- R.E.P. 85 hp 7-cyl radial 110 mm × 160 mm (4.3 in × 6.3 in)

=== Revmaster ===
- Revmaster R-800 2cyl 27 hp (Citroën 2CV)
- Revmaster R-1600D VW
- Revmaster R-1600S
- Revmaster R-1831D
- Revmaster R-1831S
- Revmaster R-2100D
- Revmaster R-2100D Turbo 70 hp at 3,200 rpm
- Revmaster R-2100S 65 hp at 3,200 rpm
- Revmaster R-2300
- Revmaster R-3000D 110 hp at 3,200 rpm

=== Rex ===
(Flugmachine Rex GesellschaftG.m.b.H.)

- Rex rotary engine

=== RFB ===
- RFB SG 85
- RFB SG 95

=== Rheem ===
- Rheem S-10 axial

=== Rheinische ===
- Rheinische 35 hp 3-cyl fan 105 mm × 130 mm (4.1 in × 5.1 in)
- Rheinische 50/60 hp 5-cyl radial 120 mm × 140 mm (4.7 in × 5.5 in)
- Rheinische 70 hp 4-cyl in-line 120 mm × 140 mm (4.7 in × 5.5 in)
- Rheinische 100 hp 6-cyl in-line 120 mm × 140 mm (4.7 in × 5.5 in)

=== Rheinmetall-Borsig ===
- Rheinmetall 109-502
- Rheinmetall 109-505
- Rheinmetall 109-515 rocket (solid fuel)
- Rheinmetall Rheintochter R 1 first stage
- Rheinmetall Rheintochter R 1 second stage
- Rheinmetall Rheintochter R 3 first stage

=== Rhenania ===
(Rhenania Motorenwerke)

- Rhenania 11-cyl. rotary engine

=== Ricardo ===
- Ricardo-Burt S55/4
- Ricardo-Halford-Armstrong R.H.A.

=== Richard & Hering ===
(Rex-Simplex Automobilwerke)

- Richard & Hering engines

=== Richardson ===
(Archibald and Mervyn, Sydney Australia)

- Richardson rotary

=== Righter Manufacturing ===
- Righter O-15
- Righter O-45

=== Roberts ===
(Roberts Motor Company / E.W. Roberts, Sandusky. Ohio)

- Roberts 50 hp 4-cyl in-line 4.5 in × 5 in (110 mm × 130 mm)
- Roberts 75 hp 6-cyl in-line 4.5 in × 5 in (110 mm × 130 mm)
- Roberts 4-X.
- Roberts 6-X 100 hp 5 in × 5 in (130 mm × 130 mm)
- Roberts 6-XX 200 hp 6.5 in × 6 in (170 mm × 150 mm)
- Roberts 6-Z
- Roberts E-12 350 hp 6 in × 6.5 in (150 mm × 170 mm)

=== Robinson ===
(Grinnell Aeroplane Co. / William C. Robinson)

- Robinson 60 hp
- Robinson 100 hp

=== Robinson ===
- Robinson R-13

=== Roché ===
(Jean A Roché)

- Roché L-267

=== Rocket Propulsion Establishment ===
- RPE Gamma

=== Rocketdyne ===
- Rocketdyne 16NS-1,000
- Rocketdyne AR1
- Rocketdyne AR2
- Rocketdyne LR36 (AR1)
- Rocketdyne LR42 (AR2)
- Rocketdyne LR64
- Rocketdyne LR79
- Rocketdyne LR89
- Rocketdyne LR101
- Rocketdyne LR105
- Rocketdyne Aeolus
- Rocketdyne A-7 Redstone
- Rocketdyne E-1
- Rocketdyne F-1 (RP-1/LOX) Saturn V.
- Rocketdyne H-1 (RP-1/LOX) Saturn I, Saturn IB, Jupiter, and some Deltas
- Rocketdyne J-2 (LH2/LOX) Saturn V and Saturn IB.
- Rocketdyne M-34
- Rocketdyne MA-2
- Rocketdyne MA-3
- Rocketdyne MB-3
- Rocketdyne MB-93
- Rocketdyne P-4
- Rocketdyne RS-25 (LH2/LOX) Used by the Space Shuttle
- Rocketdyne RS-27A (RP-1/LOX) Used by the Delta II/III and Atlas ICBM
- Rocketdyne RS-68 (LH2/LOX) Used by the Delta IV Heavy core stage
- Rocketdyne Kiwi Nuclear rocket engine
- Rocketdyne Megaboom modular sled rocket
- Rocketdyne Vernier engine Atlas, some Thor with MA-2 & MB-3

=== Rocky Mountain ===
- Rocky Mountain Pegasus

=== Rollason ===
- Rollason Ardem RTW
- Rollason Ardem 4 CO2 FH mod

=== Rolls-Royce Limited ===
Sources: Piston engines, Lumsden, gas turbine and rocket engines, Gunston.

Note: For alternative 'RB' gas turbine designations please see the Rolls-Royce aero engine template.

- Rolls-Royce 190hp
- Rolls-Royce 250hp
- Rolls-Royce Avon
- Rolls-Royce Bristol Olympus
- Rolls-Royce Buzzard
- Rolls-Royce Clyde
- Rolls-Royce Condor
- Rolls-Royce Condor diesel
- Rolls-Royce Conway
- Rolls-Royce Crecy
- Rolls-Royce Dart
- Rolls-Royce Derwent
- Rolls Royce Eagle (H-24)
- Rolls-Royce Eagle (V-12)
- Rolls-Royce Eagle (X-16)
- Rolls-Royce Exe
- Rolls-Royce Falcon
- Rolls-Royce Gem
- Rolls-Royce Gnome
- Rolls-Royce Goshawk
- Rolls-Royce Griffon
- Rolls-Royce Hawk
- Rolls-Royce Kestrel
- Rolls-Royce Merlin
- Rolls-Royce Nene
- Rolls-Royce Olympus
- Rolls-Royce Pegasus
- Rolls-Royce Pennine
- Rolls-Royce Peregrine
- Rolls-Royce R
- Rolls-Royce RB.44 Tay
- Rolls-Royce RB.50 Trent
- Rolls-Royce RB.106
- Rolls-Royce RB.108
- Rolls-Royce RB.141 Medway
- Rolls-Royce RB.145
- Rolls-Royce/MAN Turbo RB153
- Rolls-Royce RB.162
- Rolls-Royce RB.175
- Rolls-Royce RB.181
- Rolls-Royce/MAN Turbo RB193
- Rolls-Royce RB.203 Trent
- Rolls-Royce RB.207
- Rolls-Royce RB211
- Rolls-Royce Soar
- Rolls-Royce Spey
- Rolls-Royce Tweed
- Rolls-Royce Tyne
- Rolls-Royce Viper
- Rolls-Royce Vulture
- Rolls-Royce Welland
- Rolls-Royce/Continental C90
- Rolls-Royce/Continental O-200
- Rolls-Royce/Continental O-240
- Rolls-Royce/Continental O-300
- Rolls-Royce/Continental GIO-470
- Rolls-Royce/Continental IO-520
- Rolls-Royce RZ.2
- Rolls-Royce RZ.12
- Rolls-Royce Type C turboramjet

=== Rolls-Royce Holdings ===
Note: For alternative 'RB' gas turbine designations please see the Rolls-Royce aero engine template.

- Rolls-Royce Trent
- Rolls-Royce AE 1107C-Liberty
- Rolls-Royce AE 2100
- Rolls-Royce AE 3007
- Rolls-Royce AE 3010
- Rolls-Royce AE 3012
- Rolls-Royce BR700
- Rolls-Royce BR701
- Rolls-Royce BR710
- Rolls-Royce BR715
- Rolls-Royce RB.183 Tay
- Rolls-Royce RB.200
- Rolls-Royce RB.202
- Rolls-Royce RB.203 Trent
- Rolls-Royce RB.207
- Rolls-Royce RB.213
- Rolls-Royce RB.220
- Rolls-Royce RB401
- Rolls-Royce 250 – Allison Model 250
- Rolls-Royce RR300
- Rolls-Royce RR500
- Rolls-Royce 501
- Rolls-Royce F113 – (Spey Mk.511)
- Rolls-Royce F126 – (Tay Mk.611 / 661)
- Rolls-Royce F137 (AE3007H)
- Rolls-Royce F402 – (Rolls Royce Pegasus)
- Rolls-Royce J99
- Rolls-Royce XV99-RA-1
- Rolls-Royce T56 (T501-D)
- Rolls-Royce T68
- Rolls-Royce T406

=== Rolls-Royce Turbomeca ===
- Rolls-Royce Turbomeca Adour
- Rolls-Royce Turbomeca RTM322

=== Rolls-Royce/SNECMA ===
- Rolls-Royce/Snecma Olympus 593
- Rolls-Royce/SNECMA M45H

=== Rossel-Peugeot ===
(Frédéric Rossel et les frères Peugeot)

- Rossel-Peugeot 100 hp 4-cyl in-line 140 mm × 140 mm (5.5 in × 5.5 in)
- Rossel-Peugeot 30 hp 7-cyl rotary 109 mm × 110 mm (4.3 in × 4.3 in)
- Rossel-Peugeot 40 hp 7-cyl rotary 110 mm × 110 mm (4.3 in × 4.3 in)
- Rossel-Peugeot 50 hp 7-cyl rotary 110 mm × 110 mm (4.3 in × 4.3 in)

=== Rotax ===
- Rotax 185
- Rotax 277
- Rotax 377
- Rotax 447
- Rotax 462
- Rotax 503
- Rotax 508UL
- Rotax 532
- Rotax 535
- Rotax 582
- Rotax 642
- Rotax 618
- Rotax 804
- Rotax 912
- Rotax 914
- Rotax 915 iS
- Rotax 916 iS

=== Rotec ===
- Rotec R2800
- Rotec R3600

=== Rotex Electric ===
- Rotex Electric REB 20
- Rotex Electric REB 30
- Rotex Electric REB 50
- Rotex Electric REB 90
- Rotex Electric REG 20
- Rotex Electric REG 30
- Rotex Electric RET 30
- Rotex Electric RET 60
- Rotex Electric REX 30
- Rotex Electric REX 50
- Rotex Electric REX 90

=== RotorWay ===
- RotorWay RI-162F
- RotorWay RW-100
- RotorWay RW-133
- RotorWay RW-145
- RotorWay RW-152

=== Rotron ===
- Rotron RT300
- Rotron RT600

=== Rover ===
Rover Gas Turbines Ltd.

- Rover W.2B
- Rover Marton
- Rover Moreton
- Rover Napton
- Rover Wolston
- Rover T.P.90
- Rover/Lucas TJ125 (CT3201)
- Rover 1S60
- Rover 1S/60
- Rover 2S/150A
- Rover 748
- Rover 801
- Rover TJ-125

=== Royal Aircraft Establishment ===
- RAE 21
- RAE 22

=== Royal Aircraft Factory ===
- RAF 1
- RAF 2
- RAF 3
- RAF 4
- RAF 5
- RAF 7
- RAF 8

=== RRJAEL ===
(Rolls-Royce and Japanese Aero-engines Ltd.)

- RRJAEL RJ.500

=== Rumpler ===
- Rumpler Aeolus

=== Ruston-Proctor ===
- Ruston-Proctor 200 hp 6-stroke rotary(6-cyl 2-stroke?)

=== Ryan-Siemens ===
(Ryan Aeronautical Corp/Siemens-Halske)

- Ryan-Siemens 5 (Sh-13)
- Ryan-Siemens 7 (Sh-14)
- Ryan-Siemens 9 (Sh-12)
- Ryan-Siemens Sh-14

=== Rybinsk Motor Factory ===
- DN-200
- Rybinsk RD-36-35
- Rybinsk RD-38

== S ==
=== SACMA ===
(Guy Negre)

- SACMA 100
- SACMA 120
- SACMA 150
- SACMA 180
- SACMA 240

=== Safran Helicopter Engines ===
- Safran Arrano
- Safran Aneto

=== SAI Ambrosini ===
- Ambrosini P-25 – 2-cyl. horizontally opposed

=== Salmson ===
Salmson air-cooled aero-engines

- Salmson 3A, 3Ad
- Salmson 5A, 5Ac, 5Ap, 5Aq
- Salmson 6A, 6Ad, 6Af
- Salmson 6TE, 6TE.S
- Salmson 7A, 7AC, 7ACa, 7Aq
- Salmson 7M
- Salmson 7O, 7Om
- Salmson 9AB, 9ABa, 9ABc
- Salmson 9AC
- Salmson 9AD
- Salmson 9AE, 9AEr, 9AErs
- Salmson 9NA, 9NAs, 9NC, 9ND, 9NE, 9NH
- Salmson 11B
- Salmson 12C W-12?
- Salmson 12V, 12Vars – V-12

Salmson water-cooled aero-engines

- Salmson A – 2x7-cylinder barrel engine, 1 built
- Salmson B – 2x7-cylinder barrel engine, 1 built
- Salmson C – 2x7-cylinder barrel engine, 1 built
- Salmson E – 2x9-cylinder barrel engine, 1 built
- Salmson F – 2x9-cylinder barrel engine, 1 built
- Salmson G – 2x7-cylinder barrel engine, 1 built
- Salmson K – 2x7-cylinder barrel engine, 1 built
- Salmson A.7
- Salmson A.9
- Salmson 2A.9 – a 2-row radial engine
- Salmson B.9 water-cooled radial engine
- Salmson C.9 water-cooled radial engine
- Salmson M.9 water-cooled radial engine
- Salmson P.9 water-cooled radial engine
- Salmson R.9 water-cooled radial engine
- Salmson M.7 water-cooled radial engine
- Salmson 2M.7 water-cooled 2-row radial engine
- Salmson 9.Z, 9.Za, 9.Zc, 9.Zm

Salmsons 18 cylinder in-line radial engines

- Salmson 18Z (1919) 9-bank water-cooled in-line radial 2 x 9Z on common 2-throw crankshaft
- Salmson 18AB (1920s) 9-bank air-cooled in-line radial
- Salmson 18Cm, 18Cma, 18Cmb – (late 20s early 30s) 9-bank water-cooled (air-cooled heads) in-line radial
- Salmson-Szydlowski SH.18 – 18-cyl 2-stroke radial diesel engine (nine banks of two in-line)

Licence-built

- Argus As 10 – as Salmson 8As.00, 8As.04

=== Saroléa ===
- Saroléa V-4
- Saroléa Albatros 30 hp 2HO
- Saroléa Aiglon
- Saroléa Vautour 32 hp 2HO
- Saroléa Epervier 25 hp 2HO

=== S.A.N.A. ===
- S.A.N.A. 700 hp

=== Saunders-Roe ===
- Saunders-Roe 45 lbf pulse-jet
- Saunders-Roe 120 lbf pulse-jet

=== Sauer ===
- Sauer S 1800
- Sauer S 1800 UL
- Sauer S 1900 UL
- Sauer S 2100
- Sauer S 2100 UL
- Sauer S 2200 UL
- Sauer S 2400 UL
- Sauer S 2500
- Sauer S 2500 UL
- Sauer S 2700 UL

=== Saurer ===
- GT-15
- YS-2
- YS-3
- YS-4

=== Scania-Vabis ===
- Scania-Vabis PD

=== Schliha ===
(Schlüpmannsche Industrie und Handelsgesellschaft)

- Schliha 36 hp 2-cyl
- Schliha F-1200

=== Schmidding ===
- Schmidding 109-505 rocket (solid fuel)
- Schmidding 109-513
- Schmidding 109-533
- Schmidding 109-543
- Schmidding 109-553
- Schmidding 109-563
- Schmidding 109-573
- Schmidding 109-593
- Schmidding 109-603

=== Schroeter ===
- Schroeter 89 hp 6-cyl in-line 124 mm × 160 mm (4.9 in × 6.3 in)

=== Schwade ===
(Otto Schwade GmbH, Erfurt, Germany)

- Schwade Stahlherz engine

=== SCI Aviation ===
- R6-80
- R6-150
- B4-160

=== Scott ===
- Scott A2S Flying Squirrel
- Scott 40 hp 2-stroke
- Scott 1939 2-stroke
- Scott 1950 2-stroke V4

=== Security ===
(Security Aircraft Corporation)

- Security S-5-120

=== Sega ===
- Sega trunnion radial engine

=== SELA ===
(Société d'Etude pour la Locomotion Aérienne [SELA])

- SELA V-8

=== Seld ===
(Seld-Kompressorbau G.m.b.H.)

- Seld F2

=== SEPR ===
- SEPR 9
- SEPR 16
- SEPR 24
- SEPR 25
- SEPR 35
- SEPR 44
- SEPR 50
- SEPR 55
- SEPR 57
- SEPR 63
- SEPR 65
- SEPR 66
- SEPR 73
  - SEPR 732
  - SEPR 734
    - SEPR 7341
  - SEPR 737
  - SEPR 738
  - SEPR 739 (Stromboli)
- SEPR 78
- SEPR 81A
- SEPR 167
- SEPR 178
- SEPR 189
- SEPR 192
- SEPR 200 (Tramontane)
- SEPR 201
- SEPR 202
  - SEPR 2020
- SEPR 251
- SEPR 481
- SEPR 504
- SEPR 505
  - SEPR 5051
  - SEPR 5052
  - SEPR 50531
  - SEPR 5054
- SEPR 631
- SEPR 683
- SEPR 684
- SEPR 685
  - SEPR 6854
- SEPR 686
- SEPR 703
- SEPR 705
- SEPR 706
- SEPR 740
- SEPR 841
- SEPR 844
- SEPR Topaze
- SEPR Diamante
- SEPR C2

=== Sergant ===
- Sergant A

=== SERMEL ===
- SERMEL TRS 12
- SERMEL TRS 18
- SERMEL TRS 25

=== SFFA ===
(Société Française de Fabrication Aéronautique, France)

- SFFA Type A 100 hp 7-cyl
- SFFA Type B 45 hp 3-cyl

=== SFECMAS ===
- SFECMAS Ars 600
- SFECMAS Ars 900
- SFECMAS 12H
- SFECMAS 12K

=== Shenyang ===
- Shenyang PF-1
- Shenyang Aircraft Development Office PF-1A
- Shenyang WP-5
- Shenyang WP-6
- Shenyang WP-7
- Shenyang WP-14 ("Kunlun")
- Shenyang WS-5
- Shenyang WS-6
- Shenyang WS-8
- Shenyang WS-10
- Shenyang WS-15
- Shenyang WS-20

=== Shimadzu ===
- Shimadzu 80 hp 9-cyl rotary 105 mm × 140 mm (4.1 in × 5.5 in)
- Shimadzu 90 hp V-8 110 mm × 110 mm (4.5 in × 4.5 in)

=== Shvetsov ===
Data from:Russian Piston Aero Engines

- Shvetsov M-11
- Shvetsov M-3
- Shvetsov M-25
- Shvetsov M-62
- Shvetsov M-63
- Shvetsov M-64
- Shvetsov M-65
- Shvetsov M-70
- Shvetsov M-71
- Shvetsov M-72
- Shvetsov M-80
- Shvetsov M-81
- Shvetsov M-82
- Shvetsov ASh-2
- Shvetsov ASh-3
- Shvetsov ASh-4
- Shvetsov ASh-21
- Shvetsov ASh-62
- Shvetsov ASh-72 (M-72?)
- Shvetsov ASh-73
- Shvetsov ASh-82
- Shvetsov ASh-83
- Shvetsov ASh-84
- Shvetsov ASh-90
- Shvetsov ASh-93

=== S.H.K. ===
- S.H.K. 70 hp 7-cyl rotary 110 mm × 140 mm (4.3 in × 5.5 in)
- S.H.K. 140 hp 14-cyl rotary 110 mm × 140 mm (4.3 in × 5.5 in)
- S.H.K. 90 hp 7-cyl rotary 124 mm × 140 mm (4.9 in × 5.5 in)
- S.H.K. 180 hp 14-cyl rotary 124 mm × 140 mm (4.9 in × 5.5 in)

=== Siddeley-Deasy ===
- Siddeley Ounce
- Siddeley Pacific
- Siddeley Puma
- Siddeley Tiger

=== Siemens ===
- Siemens SP90G
- Siemens SP260D

=== Siemens-Halske ===
- Siemens-Halske 100PS 9-cyl rotary
- Siemens VI
- Siemens-Halske Sh.0
- Siemens-Halske Sh.I
- Siemens-Halske Sh.II
- Siemens-Halske Sh.III
- Siemens-Halske Sh 4
- Siemens-Halske Sh 5
- Siemens-Halske Sh 6
- Siemens-Halske Sh 7
- Siemens-Halske Sh 10
- Siemens-Halske Sh 11
- Siemens-Halske Sh 12
- Siemens-Halske Sh 13
- Siemens-Halske Sh 14
- Siemens-Halske Sh 15
- Siemens-Bramo Sh 20
- Siemens-Bramo Sh 21
- Siemens-Bramo Sh 22
- Siemens-Bramo Sh 25
- Siemens-Bramo Sh 28
- Siemens-Bramo Sh 29
- Siemens Bramo SAM 22B
- Siemens Bramo 314
- Siemens Bramo 322
- Siemens Bramo 323 Fafnir

=== Silnik ===
- Silnik M 11
- Silnik Sh 14

=== Simms ===
- Simms 51 hp V-6 4.33 in × 4.33 in (110 mm × 110 mm)

=== Simonini Racing ===
- Simonini 200cc
- Simonini Mini 2 Evo
- Simonini Mini 2 Plus
- Simonini Mini 3
- Simonini Mini 4
- Simonini Victor 1 Super
- Simonini Victor 2
- Simonini Victor 2 Plus
- Simonini Victor 2 Super

=== Škoda ===
- Skoda G-594 Czarny Piotruś
- Skoda L
- Skoda Lr
- Skoda S.14
- Skoda S.20
- Skoda Hispano-Suiza W-12

=== Skymotors ===
- Skymotors 70
- Skymotors 70A

=== Smallbone ===
(Harry Eales Smallbone)

- Smallbone 4-cyl wobble-plate axial piston engine

=== Smalley ===
(General Machinery Co)

- Smalley Aero

=== SMA Engines ===
- SMA SR305-230
- SMA SR460

=== Smith ===
- Smith Static
- Smith 300 hp radial

=== SMPMC ===
(South Motive Power and Machinery Complex SMPMC prev Zhuzhou Aeroengine Factory)

- SMPMC HS-5 – Chinese production of ShvetsovvASh-62
- SMPMC HS-6 – Chinese production of Ivchenko AI-14
- SMPMC WZ-8 – Chinese production of Turbomeca Arriel
- SMPMC WZ-9
- SMPMC WZ-16

=== SNCAN ===
- SNCAN Ars 600
- SNCAN Ars 900
- SNCAN Pulse-jet

=== SNECMA ===
Société nationale d'études et de construction de moteurs d'aviation formed by nationalisation of Gnome et Rhône in 1945. On French engine designations even sub-series numbers (for example Gnome-Rhône 14N-68) rotated anti-clockwise (LH rotation) and were generally fitted on the starboard side, odd numbers (for example Gnome-Rhône 14N-69) rotated clockwise (RH rotation) and were fitted on the port side.

- SNECMA Régnier 4L
- SNECMA 12S/12T – post war Argus As 411 production
- SNECMA-GR 14M – Gnome-Rhône 14M
- SNECMA-GR 14N – Gnome-Rhône 14N
- SNECMA 14NC Diesel 1945 1,015 hp
- SNECMA 14R
- SNECMA 14U 1948 2,200 hp(14R-1000)
- SNECMA 14X Super Mars 1949 850 hp
  - SNECMA 14X-02
  - SNECMA 14X-04
  - SNECMA 14X-H
- SNECMA 28T 1945 3,500 hp
- SNECMA 32HL 1947 4,000 hp
- SNECMA 36T 1948 4,150 hp
- SNECMA 42T 1946 5,000 hp
- SNECMA M26
- SNECMA M28
- SNECMA M45/Mars
- Rolls-Royce/SNECMA M45H
- SNECMA Turbomeca Larzac (M49)
- SNECMA M53
- SNECMA M88
- SNECMA Atar 101
- SNECMA Atar 8
- SNECMA Atar 9
- SNECMA Hercules – Bristol Hercules
- Snecma Silvercrest
- SNECMA-BMW 132Z
- SNECMA / Pratt & Whitney TF104
- SNECMA / Pratt & Whitney TF106
- SNECMA / Pratt & Whitney TF306
- SNECMA-Renault 4P
- SNECMA-Renault 6Q
- SNECMA Hispano 12B 1950 2,200 hp
- SNECMA Hispano 12Y 1947 900 hp
- SNECMA Hispano 12Z
- SNECMA Super ATAR
- SNECMA R.104 Vulcain
- SNECMA R.105 Vesta
- SNECMA Escopette
- SNECMA Tromblon
- SNECMA Ecrevisse Type A
- SNECMA Ecrevisse Type B
- SNeCMA AS.11
- SNECMA S.402 A.3
- SNECMA S.407 A.2
- SNECMA TA-1000
- SNECMA TB-1000

=== SNCM ===
(Société Nationale de Constructions de Moteurs – Lorraine post 1936)

- Lorraine Type 120 Algol
- Lorraine Type 111 Sterna
- Lorraine Type 112 Sirius

=== SOCEMA ===
(Société de Construction et d'Équipments Méchaniques pour l'Aviation)

- SOCEMA TGA 1
- SOCEMA TG 1008
- SOCEMA TGAR 1008
- SOCEMA TP.1
- SOCEMA TP.2

=== Sodemo ===
- Sodemo V2-1.0
- Sodemo V2-1.2

=== Solar ===
- Solar PJ32 pulse-jet
- Solar T45 (Mars 50 hp gas turbine)
- Solar T62 Titan
- Solar T66 free turbine Titan
- Solar T-150
- Solar Centaur 40
- Solar Centaur 50
- Solar Jupiter (500 hp gas turbine)
- Solar Mars 90
- Solar Mars 100
- Solar Mercury 50
- Solar Saturn
- Solar Saturn 10
- Solar Saturn 20
- Solar Taurus 60
- Solar Taurus 65
- Solar Taurus 70
- Solar Titan 130
- Solar Titan 250
- Solar A-103B (early detachable afterburner for J34)
- Solar AAP-80
- Solar M-80
- Solar MA-1 (Mars)
- Solar T-41M-1
- Solar T-41M-2
- Solar T-41M-5
- Solar T-41M-6
- Solar T-45M-1 (Mars)
- Solar T-45M-2
- Solar T-45M-7
- Solar T-300J-2
- Solar T-520J
- Solar T-522J

=== Solo ===
(Solo Kleinmotoren GmbH)

- Solo 560, also known as the Hirth F-10, used in the Scheibe SF-24 Motorspatz
- Solo 2350, widely used in motor-gliders
- Solo 2625 01
- Solo 2625 02, used in the Glaser-Dirks DG-500, Schempp-Hirth Ventus-2, Sportinė Aviacija LAK-20 etc.
- Solo 2625 02i, a fuel-injected version used in the Schempp-Hirth Arcus and Schempp-Hirth Quintus self-launching gliders

=== Soloviev ===
Source:Gunston.

- Soloviev D-15
- Soloviev D-20
- Soloviev D-25V (TB-2BM)
- Soloviev D-30
- Soloviev D-30K (completely revised)
- Soloviev D-90A

=== Soloy ===
(Soloy Conversions / Soloy Dual Pak Inc.)

- Soloy Dual Pac
- Soloy Turbine Pac

=== Soverini ===
(Soverini Freres et Cie)

- Soverini-Echard 4D
- Soverini-Echard 4DR

=== Soviet union experimental engines ===
- AD-1 (diesel engine)
- AD-3 (diesel engine)
- AD-5 (diesel engine)
- FED-8 (diesel engine)
- MB-100 (A.M. Dobrotvorskiy)
- MB-102 (A.M. Dobrotvorskiy)
- MSK (diesel engine)
- AN-1 (diesel engine)
- AN-1A (diesel engine)
- AN-1R (diesel engine) (geared)
- AN-1RTK (diesel engine) (geared, turbo-supercharged)
- AN-5 (diesel engine) (N – Neftyanoy – of crude oil type – 24-cyl rhombic opposed piston)
- AN-20 (diesel engine) (24-cyl rhombic opposed piston)
- BD-2A (diesel engine)
- M-1 (aero-engine) (V-12 a.k.a. M-116 – S.D. Kolosov)
- M-5-400
- M-9 (L.I. Starostin – swashplate engine)
- M-10 (diesel engine) (5-cyl radial)
- M-16 (aero-engine) (4-cyl horizontally opposed – S.D. Kolosov)
- M-20 (diesel engine) (48-cyl rhombic opposed piston)
- M-30 (diesel engine)
- M-31 (diesel engine)
- M-35 (diesel engine)
- M-40 (diesel engine)
- M-47 (aero-engine) – fitted to Ilyushin Il-20
- M-50R (diesel engine) (marine rhombic opposed piston)
- M-52 (diesel engine)
- M-87D (diesel engine)
- M-116 (aero-engine) (V-12 a.k.a. M-1 – S.D. Kolosov)
- M-127 (X-24 conrod free)
- M-127K (X-24 conrod free)
- M-130 (aircraft engine) (H-24)
- M-224 (diesel engine)
- M-501 (diesel engine)
- MB-4 (X-4 MB – O Motor Besshatunniy – con-rod free engine – S.S. Balandin)
- MB-4b (X-4 MB – O Motor Besshatunniy – con-rod free engine – S.S. Balandin)
- MB-8 (X-8 MB – O Motor Besshatunniy – con-rod free engine – S.S. Balandin)
- MB-8b (X-8 MB – O Motor Besshatunniy – con-rod free engine – S.S. Balandin)
- MF-45Sh (M-47)
- D-11 (diesel engine) (5-cyl radial based on the M-11)
- N-1 (diesel engine) (N – Neftyanoy – of crude oil type)
- N-2 (diesel engine)
- N-3 (diesel engine)
- N-4 (diesel engine)
- N-5 (diesel engine)
- N-6 (diesel engine)
- N-9 (diesel engine)
- OMB (OMB – O Motor Besshatunniy – con-rod free engine – S.S. Balandin)
- OMB-127 (X-12 MB – O Motor Besshatunniy – con-rod free engine – S.S. Balandin)
- OMB-127RN (X-12 MB – O Motor Besshatunniy – con-rod free engine – S.S. Balandin)

=== Soyuz ===
(AMNTK Soyuz)

- Soyuz R-79V-300
- Soyuz R-79M
- Soyuz R-179-300
- Soyuz VK-21
- Soyuz R134-300

=== SPA ===
- SPA 6A

=== Speer ===
- Speer S-2-C

=== Sperry ===
(Lawrence Sperry Aircraft Co)

- Sperry WBB 2-stroke

=== Spyker ===
- Spijker 135 hp rotary

=== Sport Plane Power ===
(Sport Plane Power Inc.)

- Sport Plane Power K-100A

=== STAL ===
- STAL Skuten
- STAL Dovern

=== Star ===
(Star Engineering Co. ltd.)

- Star 40 hp

=== Stark ===
(Stark Flugzeugbau KG)

- Stark Stamo 1400

=== Statax ===
(Statax Engine Company Ltd. – prev. Statax-Motor of Zurich)

- Statax 3cyl 10 hp axial
- Statax 5cyl 40 hp axial
- Statax 7cyl 80 hp axial
- Statax 10cyl 100 hp axial

=== Stoewer ===
- Stoewer 125 hp
- Stoewer 150 hp
- Stoewer 180 hp

=== Stratus 2000 ===
- Stratus EJ 22

=== Straughan ===
(Straughn Aircraft Corp)

- Straughan AL-1000 (Ford model 1A)

=== Studebaker ===
- H-9350 (24cyl 153.2 litres)

=== Studebaker-Waterman ===
- Studebaker-Waterman S-1

=== Sturtevant ===
- Sturtevant D-4 – 48 hp (36 kW) inline-four
- Sturtevant D-6 – 73 hp (54 kW) inline-six
- Sturtevant E-4 – 100 hp (75 kW) inline-four
- Sturtevant Model 5 – 140 hp (100 kW) V8
- Sturtevant Model 5A – 140 hp (100 kW) V8 (aluminum cylinders)
- Sturtevant Model 5A-4½ – 210 hp (160 kW) V8
- Sturtevant Model 7 – 300 hp (220 kW) V12

=== Subaru ===
- Subaru EJ25
- Subaru EA82

=== Sulzer ===
- Sulzer ATAR 09C

=== Sunbeam ===
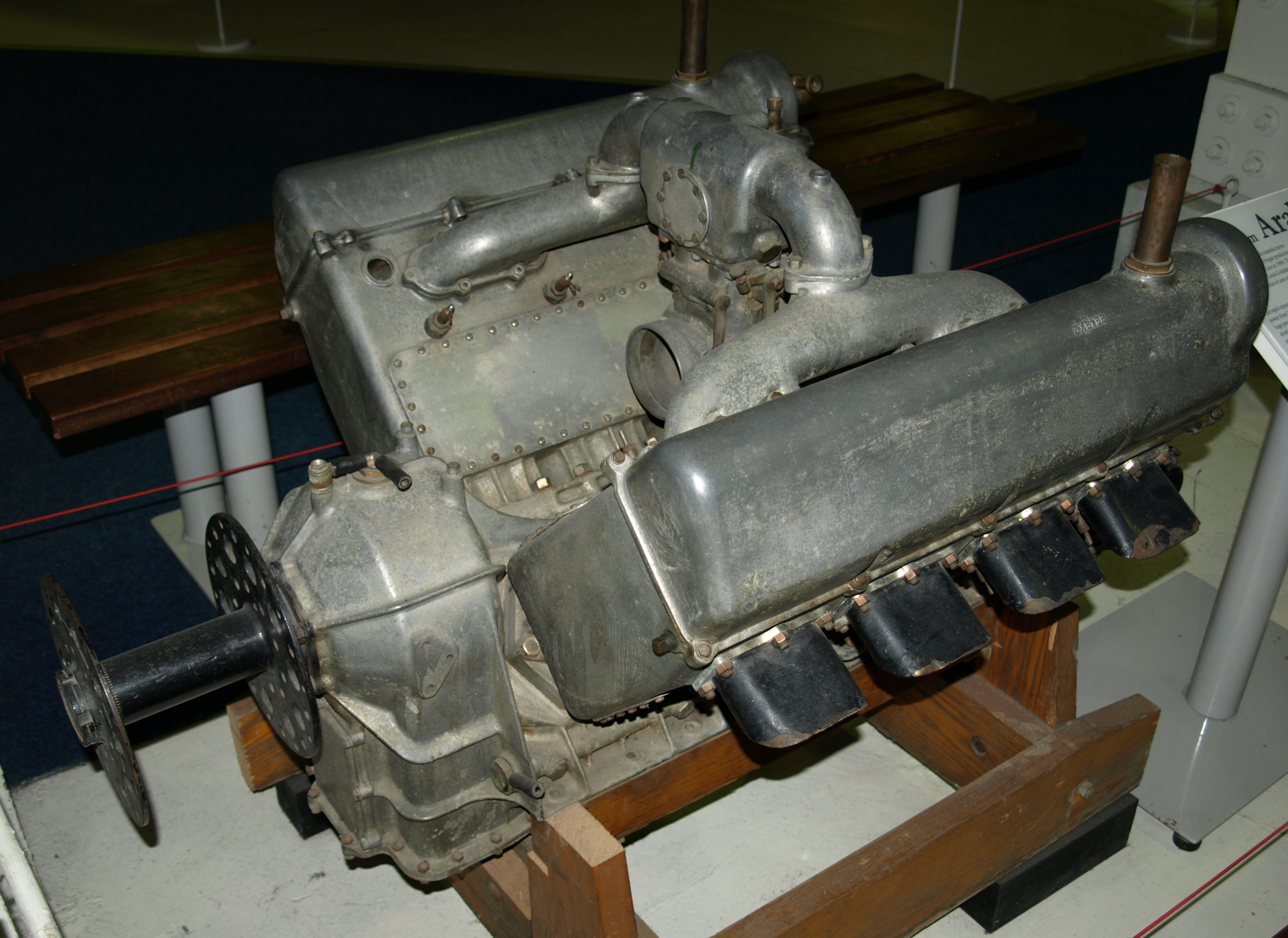
Sunbeam Arab engine on display at the Royal Air Force Museum London

Source: Lumsden.

- Sunbeam 110 hp
- Sunbeam 150 hp
- Sunbeam 200 hp
- Sunbeam 225 hp
- Sunbeam Afridi
- Sunbeam Amazon
- Sunbeam Arab
- Sunbeam Bedouin
- Sunbeam Cossack
- Sunbeam Crusader
- Sunbeam Dyak
- Sunbeam Gurkha
- Sunbeam Kaffir
- Sunbeam Malay
- Sunbeam Maori
- Sunbeam Manitou
- Sunbeam Matabele
- Sunbeam Mohawk
- Sunbeam Nubian
- Sunbeam Pathan
- Sunbeam Saracen
- Sunbeam Sikh
- Sunbeam Semi-Sikh
- Sunbeam Sikh II a.k.a. Semi-Sikh
- Sunbeam Sikh III
- Sunbeam Spartan
- Sunbeam Tartar
- Sunbeam Viking
- Sunbeam Zulu
- Sunbeam 2,000 hp – engine for Kaye Don's Silver Bullet land speed record car

=== Superior ===
- Superior Air Parts XP-320
- Superior Air Parts XP-360
- Superior Air Parts XP-382
- Superior Air Parts XP-400
- Superior Air Parts Gemini Diesel 100
- Superior Air Parts Gemini Diesel 125
- Superior Air Parts Vantage

=== Survol-de Coucy ===
- Survol-de Coucy Pygmée 40 hp

=== Svenska ===
- Svenska Flygmotor P/15-54
- IA R-19-SR/1 Indio
- Svenska Flygmotor RM1 Goblin
- Svenska Flygmotor RM2 Ghost
- Svenska Flygmotor RM5 Avon
- Svenska Flygmotor RM6 Avon
- Svenska Flygmotor RR2
- Svenska RM8
- Svenska F-451-A Trollet
- Svenska Flygmotor VR-3

=== Szekely ===
- Szekely SR-3 O 3-cyl (SR – "Sky Roamer")
- Szekely SR-3 L
- Szekely SR-5 5-cyl
- Szekely 100 7-cyl
- Szekely O-125

== T ==
=== Take Off ===
- Take Off TBM 10
- Take Off TBM 11
- Take Off TBM 12

=== Tatra ===
- Tatra T100
- Tatra T101

=== TBS ===
(Turbinenbau Schuberth Schwabhausen GmbH)

- TBS 400N-J40P

=== TEC ===
See: Mosler

=== Technopower ===
(Technopower Inc.)

- Technopower Twin O-101

=== TEI ===
- TEI-PD170
- TEI-TJ300
- TEI-TJ35
- TEI-TP38
- TEI-TJ90
- TEI-TF6000
- TEI-TF10000
- TEI-TF35000
- TEI TS1400

=== Teledyne CAE ===
- CAE 210 (XT51-1 – Turbomeca Artouste I) 280 shp
- CAE 217-5 (XT72 – Turbomeca Astazou) 600shp
- CAE 217-10 (XT65 – scaled down Astazou) 305 shp
- CAE 217A (XT67 – coupled Turbomeca Astazou X)
- CAE 220-2 (XT51-3 – Turbomeca Artouste II)
- CAE 227
- CAE 300
- CAE 320 (Turbomeca Palas – 350 lbf thrust)
- CAE 325 (Continental TS325-1?)
- CAE 324
- CAE 382
- Continental T51 – (development of Turbomeca Artouste I) 280 shp
- CAE T72 – (Turbomeca Astazou) 600shp
- CAE T65 – (scaled down Astazou) 305 shp
- CAE T67 – (coupled Turbomeca Astazou X)
- Teledyne CAE 352
- Teledyne CAE 354
- Teledyne CAE 356
- Teledyne CAE 365
- Teledyne CAE 370
- Teledyne CAE 372
- Teledyne CAE 373
- Teledyne CAE 382
- Teledyne CAE 402
- Teledyne CAE 440
- Teledyne CAE 444
- Teledyne CAE 455
- Teledyne CAE 472 (see F106)
- Teledyne CAE 490
- Teledyne CAE 555
- Teledyne CAE J69
- Teledyne CAE LJ95
- Teledyne CAE J100
- Teledyne CAE J402
- Teledyne CAE F106
- Teledyne CAE F408
- Teledyne CAE CJ69
- Teledyne CAE TS120

=== TEM (Turbine Engine Manufacturing) ===
- Owj
- Toloue-4
- Jahesh-700

=== Thaheld ===
- Thaheld O-290 diesel

=== Thermo-Jet ===
(Thermo-Jet Standard Inc.)

- Thermo-Jet J3-200
- Thermo-Jet J5-200
- Thermo-Jet J7-300
- Thermo-Jet J8-200
- Thermo-Jet J10-200
- Thermo-Jet J13-202

=== Thames ===
(Thames Ironworks and Ship[building Co.Ltd.)

- Thames 30 hp 4OW

=== Thielert ===
- Thielert Centurion 1.7
- Thielert Centurion 4.0

=== Thiokol ===
Data from:Jane's All the World's Aircraft 1962-3

- Thiokol LR44
- Thiokol LR58
- Thiokol LR62
- Thiokol LR99
- Thiokol M6 (TX-136)
- Thiokol M10 (TX-10)
- Thiokol M12 (TX-12)
- Thiokol M16 (TX-16)
- Thiokol M18 (TX-18)
- Thiokol M19
- Thiokol M20 (TX-20)
- Thiokol M30 (TX-30)
- Thiokol M33 (TX-33)
- Thiokol M46
- Thiokol M51 (TX-131-15)
- Thiokol M55
- Thiokol M58 (TX-58)
- Thiokol TU-122
- Thiokol TX-135
- Thiokol TD-174 Guardian
- Thiokol TE-29 Recruit
- Thiokol TD-214 Pioneer
- Thiokol TE-289 Yardbird
- Thiokol TE-307 Apache

=== Thomas ===
(Thomas Aeromotor Company, United States)

- Thomas 120 hp 4-cyl in-line
- Thomas 8 135 hp 4 in × 5.5 in (100 mm × 140 mm)
- Thomas 88 150 hp 4.125 in × 5.5 in (104.8 mm × 139.7 mm)
- Thomas 890 250 hp 4.8125 in × 6 in (122.24 mm × 152.40 mm)

=== Thorotzkai ===
(Thorotzkai Péter alt, spelling Thoroczkay)

- Thorotzkai 12 hp
- Thorotzkai 22 hp 3cyl. radial
- Thorotzkai 35 hp opposed twin
- Thorotzkai typ.7 35 hp
- Thorotzkai 120 hp
- Thorotzkai Gamma-III (35 hp 3cyl. radial)

=== Thulin ===
- Thulin A (engine)
- Thulin D (engine) (Le Rhône 18E ?)
- Thulin E (engine)
- Thulin G (engine) (Le Rhône 11F ?)

=== Thunder ===
(Thunder Engines Inc.)

- Thunder TE495-TC700

=== Tierney Turbines ===
- MEP362A

=== Tiger ===
(The Light Manufacturing and Foundry Company)

- Tiger 100
- Tiger 125
- Tiger Kitten-20
- Tiger Kitten-30
- Tiger Junior 50

=== Tips ===
- Tips 480 hp 250 hp 4.5 in × 6 in (110 mm × 150 mm) (18 cyl., 1717.67 ci, air- and water-cooled rotary engine. At rated RPM the crankshaft rotated at 1800 rpm, propeller shaft at 1080 rpm and the engine body at 60 rpm. Cooling was by direct air flow and tubular radiators between the cylinders, with water circulating without hoses or pumps.)

=== Tips & Smith ===
- Super Rhone

=== Tomonoo ===
(Tomon Naoji)

- Tomono 90 hp 6-cyl in-line 4.5 in × 4.375 in (114.3 mm × 111.1 mm)

=== Tone ===
- Tone 2V9 180 hp 4.5 in × 4.375 in (114.3 mm × 111.1 mm)

=== TNCA ===
- TNCA Aztatl
- TNCA Trebol

=== Tokyo Gasu Denk/Gasuden ===
- Tokyo Gasu Denki Amakaze
- Tokyo Gasu Denki Hatakaze
- Tokyo Gasu Denki Jimpu 3
- Tokyo Gasu Denki Kamikaze
- Tokyo Gasu Denki Tempu
- Gasuden Amakaze
- Gasuden Hatakaze
- Gasuden Jimpu 3
- Gasuden Kamikaze
- Gasuden Tempu

=== Torque Master ===
(Valley Engineering)

- Torque Master 1835cc
- Torque Master 1915cc
- Torque Master 2180cc

=== Tosi ===
- Tosi 450 hp V-12 130 mm × 190 mm (5.1 in × 7.5 in)

=== Total Engine Concepts ===
- Total Engine Concepts MM CB-40

=== Trace Engines ===
- Trace turbocharged V-8

=== Train ===
(Établissements E. Train / Société des Constructions Guinard)

- Train 2T
- Train 4A
- Train 4E
- Train 4T
- Train 6C
- Train 6D
- Train 6T

=== Trebert ===
- Trebert 60 hp 6-cyl rotary barrel engine 3.75 in × 4.25 in (95 mm × 108 mm)
- Trebert 100 hp V-8

=== Tumansky ===
- Tumansky M-87
- Tumansky M-88
- Tumansky R-11
- Tumansky R-13
- Tumansky R-15
- Tumansky RU-19
- Tumansky R-21
- Tumansky R-25
- Tumansky R-266
- Tumansky R-27
- Tumansky R-29
- Tumansky RD-9

=== Turbomeca ===
Source:Gunston except where noted

- Turbomeca Arbizon
- Turbomeca Ardiden
- Turbomeca Arrius
- Turbomeca Arrius (1950s)
- Turbomeca Arriel
- Turbomeca Artouste
- Turbomeca Aspin
- Turbomeca Astazou
- Turbomeca Astafan
- Turbomeca Aubisque
- Turbomeca Autan
- Turbomeca Bastan
- Turbomeca Bi-Bastan – paired Bastan IV
- Turbomeca Gabizo
- Turbomeca Gourdon
- Turbomeca Makila
- Turbomeca Marboré
- Turbomeca Marcadau
- Turbomeca Orédon (1947) Turbomeca's first gas turbine ca 1948; name reused in 1965
- Turbomeca Ossau
- Turbomeca Palas
- Turbomeca Palouste
- Turbomeca Piméné
- Turbomeca Soular (Soulor?)
- Turbomeca Super Palas
- Turbomeca Tramontane
- Turbomeca Turmo I (turboshaft)
- Turbomeca Turmo II (turboshaft)
- Turbomeca Turmo III (turboshaft)
- Turbomeca Turmastazou
- Turbomeca Double Turmastazou
- Turbomeca TM251
- Turbomeca TM319
- Turbomeca TM333
- Turbomeca Agusta TAA230
- Turbomeca/SNECMA Larzac
- Rolls-Royce/Turbomeca RTM321
- Rolls-Royce/Turbomeca RTM322
- Rolls-Royce/Turbomeca Adour
- Rolls-Royce/Turbomeca Orédon
- MAN/Rolls-Royce/Turboméca MTR390
- MTU/Turbomeca MTM385

=== Turbo Research ===
Turbo Research was taken over by Avro Canada

- Turbo Research TR.1 – abandoned design study
- Turbo Research TR.2 – abandoned design study
- Turbo Research TR.3 – abandoned design study
- Turbo Research TR.4 – see Avro Canada Chinook
- Turbo Research TR.5 – see Avro Canada Orenda

=== Turbo-Union ===
Turbo-Union was a joint venture between Rolls-Royce Ltd, MTU and Aeritalia to produce engine for Panavia Tornado

- Turbo-Union RB199

=== Twombly Motor Company ===
Twombly Motor Company (Willard Irving Twombly)

- A 50 hp 7-cylinder rotary; 4 in × 4.5 in (100 mm × 110 mm), 1912.

== U ==
=== Ufimtsev ===
(A.G. Ufimtsev)

- Ufimtsev 1908 20 hp 2-cyl 2-stroke rotary
- Ufimtsev 1910 35-40 hp 4-cyl contra-rotating rotary
- Ufimtsev ADU-4 – 60 hp 6-cyl contra-rotating rotary

=== ULPower ===
- ULPower UL260i
- ULPower UL350i
- ULPower UL390i
- ULPower UL520i

=== Union ===
(Union Gas Engine Company, United States)

- Union 120 hp 6-cyl in-line 4.75 in × 6.5 in (121 mm × 165 mm)

=== Ursinus ===
(Ursinus Leichtmotorenbau)

- Ursinus U.1
- Ursinus U.2

=== UTC ===
(United Technology Corporation)

- UTC P-1

== V ==
=== Valley ===
(Valley Engineering)

- Valley 1915cc
- Valley 2276cc

=== Van Blerck ===
(Van Blerck Motor Co., Monroe, Michigan)

- Van Blerck 124 hp V-8
- Van Blerck 135 hp V-8 4.5 in × 5.5 in (110 mm × 140 mm)
- Van Blerck 185 hp V-12 4.5 in × 5.5 in (110 mm × 140 mm)

=== Vaslin ===
(Henri Vaslin)

- Vaslin 15 hp 1.13 L (69 cu in) flat-4
- Vaslin 24 hp 1.3 L (80 cu in)
- Vaslin 55 hp 2 L (120 cu in) 6 in-line water-cooled

=== Vauxhall ===
(Vauxhall Motors Ltd.)

- Vauxhall 175 hp V-12 90 mm × 120 mm (3.5 in × 4.7 in)

=== Vaxell ===
- Vaxell 60i
- Vaxell 80i
- Vaxell 100i

=== Vedeneyev ===
- Vedeneyev M14P

=== Velie ===
- Velie M-5
- Velie L-9

=== Verdet ===
- Verdet 55 hp 7-cyl rotary 112 mm × 140 mm (4.4 in × 5.5 in)

=== Vereinegung Volkseigener Betriebe Flugzeugbau ===
See: Pirna

=== Verner Motor ===
Source: RMV, Verner Motor range of engines,

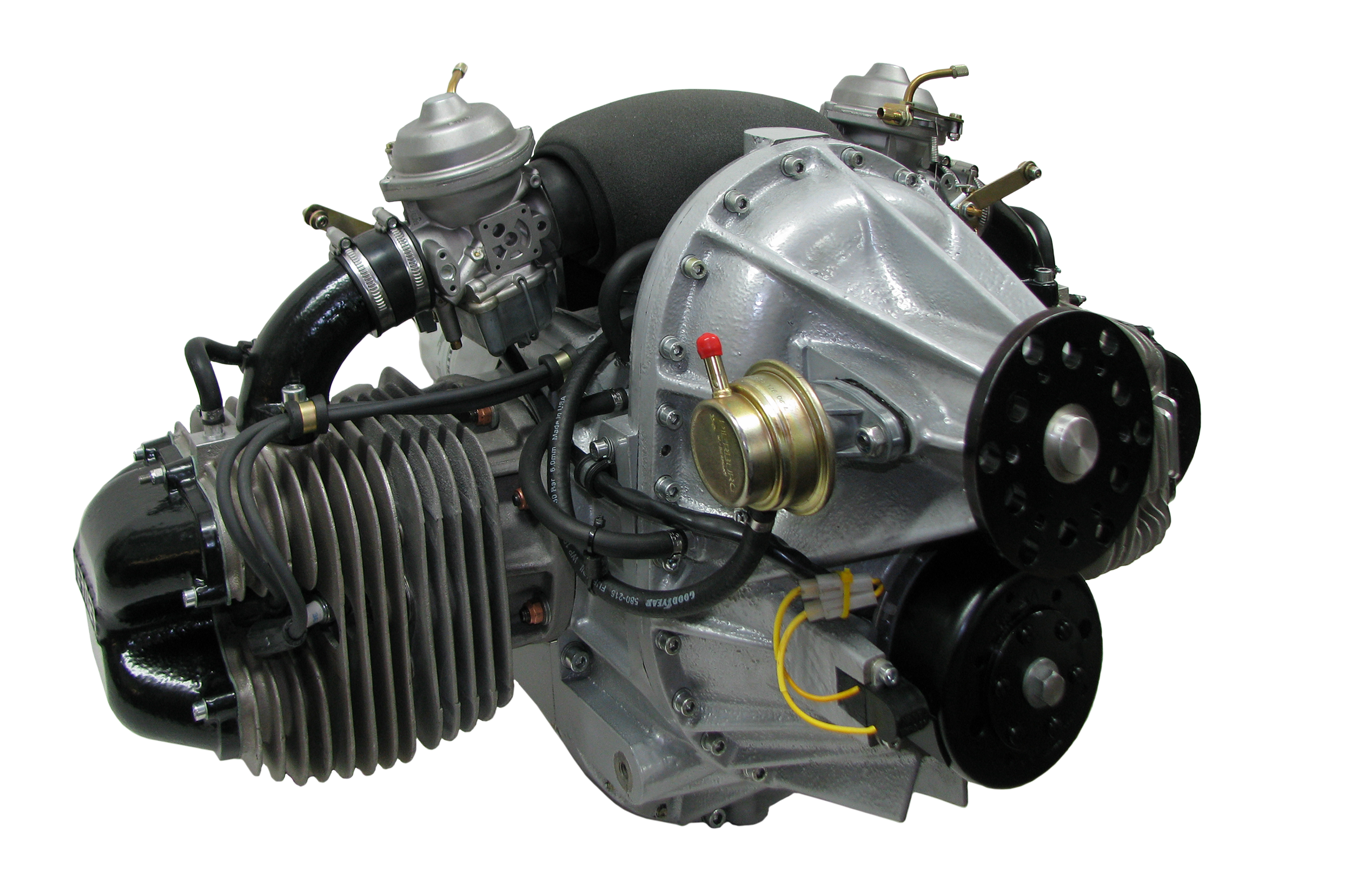
Verner VM 133

- Verner Scarlett mini 3 – 3 cyl radial
- Verner Scarlett mini 5 – 5 cyl radial
- Verner Scarlett 7H – 7 cyl radial
- Verner Scarlett 36Hi
- Verner JCV 360
- Verner VM 125
- Verner VM 133
- Verner VM 144Hi
- Verner VM 1400
- Verner Scarlett 3V
- Verner Scarlett 5V
- Verner Scarlett 5Si
- Verner Scarlett 7U
- Verner Scarlett 9S

=== Viale ===
- Viale 35 hp (1910 35-50 hp 5-cyl. radial)
- Viale 30 hp 3-cyl fan 105 mm × 130 mm (4.1 in × 5.1 in)
- Viale 50 hp 5-cyl radial 105 mm × 130 mm (4.1 in × 5.1 in)
- Viale 70 hp 7-cyl radial 105 mm × 130 mm (4.1 in × 5.1 in)
- Viale 100 hp 10-cyl radial 105 mm × 130 mm (4.1 in × 5.1 in)

=== VIJA ===
- VIJA J-10Si
- VIJA J-10Sbi
- VIJA AG-12Si
- VIJA AG-12Sbi
- VIJA J-16Ti

=== Viking ===
(Viking Aircraft Engines)

- Viking 100
- Viking 110

=== Viking ===
(Detroit Manufacturers Syndicate Inc)

- Viking 140 hp X-16 3.25 in × 4 in (83 mm × 102 mm)

=== Villiers-Hay ===
(Villiers-Hay Development Ltd.)

- Villiers-Hay 4-L-318 Maya I
- Villiers-Hay 4-L-319 Maya II

=== Vittorazi ===
(Morrovalle, Italy)

- Vittorazi Easy 100 Plus
- Vittorazi Fly 100 Evo 2
- Vittorazi Moster 185

=== Vivinus ===
Data from:

- Vivinus 32.5 hp 4-cyl in-line 4.17 in × 4.73 in (106 mm × 120 mm)
- Vivinus 37.5 hp 4-cyl in-line 4.42 in × 5.12 in (112 mm × 130 mm)
- Vivinus 39.2 hp 4-cyl in-line 4.53 in × 5.12 in (115 mm × 130 mm)
- Vivinus 50 hp 4-cyl in-line 4.17 in × 4.73 in (106 mm × 120 mm)
- Vivinus 60 hp 4-cyl in-line 4.42 in × 5.12 in (112 mm × 130 mm)
- Vivinus 70 hp 4-cyl in-line

=== Volkswagen ===
- 1/2 VW

=== Volvo Aero ===
- RM1
- RM2 – licence built de Havilland Ghost
- RM3
- RM4
- RM5, RM6 – licence built Rolls-Royce Avon
- Volvo RM8 – modified Pratt & Whitney JT8D
- Volvo RM12 – variant of General Electric F404

=== von Behren ===
- von Behren O-113 Air Horse

=== Voronezh ===
(Voronezh engine factory)

- Voronezh MV-6

== W ==
=== Wackett ===
Source: RMV

- Wackett 2-cylinder 20/25 hp
- Wackett 2-cylinder 40 hp
- Wackett Victa 1-cylinder 1924

=== Walter Aircraft Engines ===
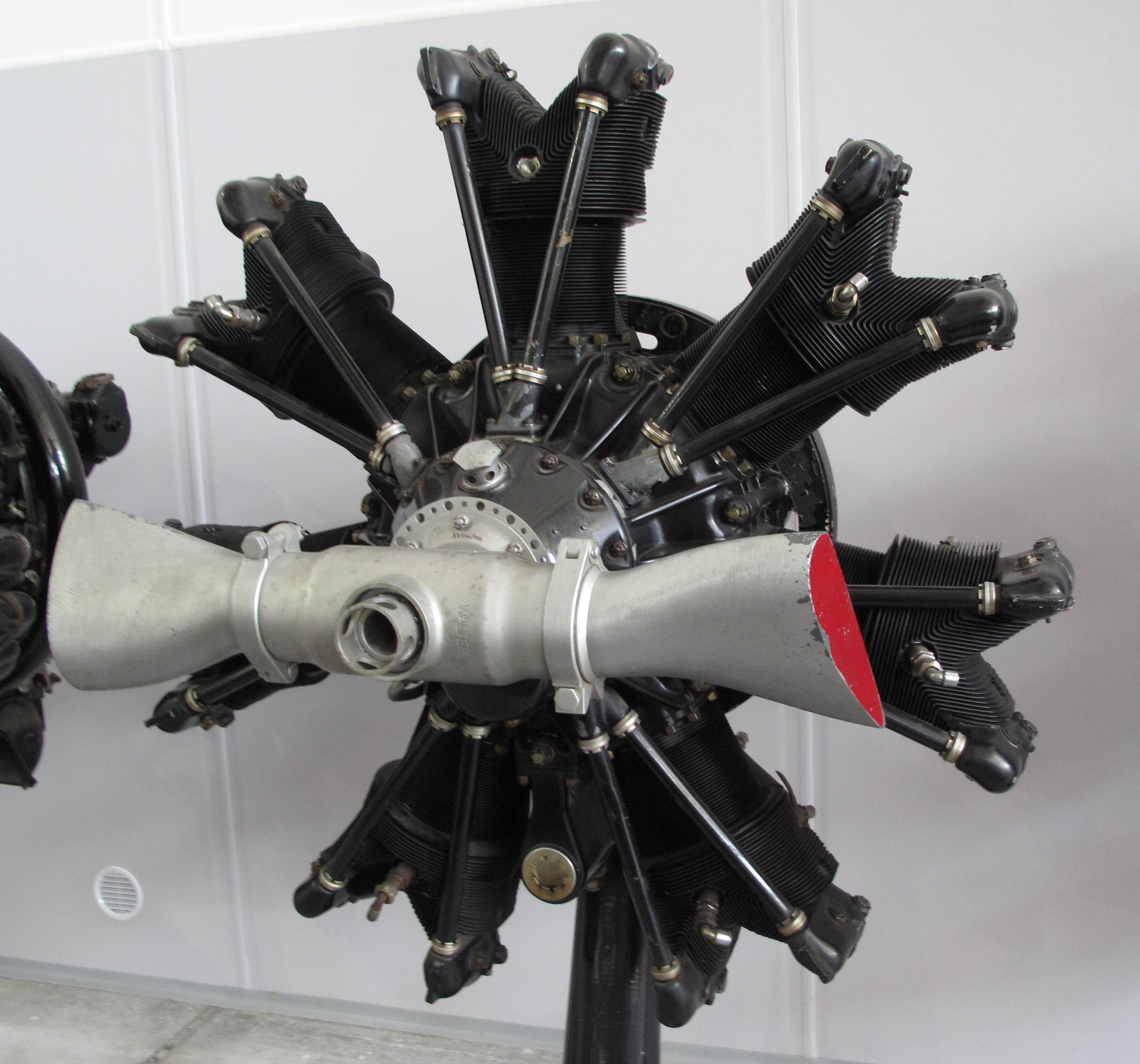
Walter Castor

- Walter A
- Walter 108H
- Walter 110H
- Walter W.III – licensed BMW IIIa
- Walter W.IV – licensed BMW IV
- Walter W.V – licensed Fiat A.20
- Walter W.VI – licensed Fiat A.22
- Walter W.VII -licensed Fiat A.24
- Walter W.VIII – licensed Fiat A.25
- Walter H80
- Walter NZ 40
- Walter NZ 60
- Walter NZ 85
- Walter NZ 120
- Walter M05 – Rolls-Royce Nene
- Walter M06 – Klimov VK-1
- Walter M701
- Walter M202
- Walter M208
- Walter M332
- Walter M337
- Walter M436
- Walter M462
- Walter M466
- Walter M601
- Walter M602
- Walter M701
- Walter Junior
- Walter Mikron
- Walter Minor 4
- Walter Minor 6
- Walter Minor 12 I-MR
- Walter Major 4-1
- Walter Major 6-1
- Walter Atlas
- Walter Atom
- Walter Bora
- Walter Castor
- Walter Gemma
- Walter Jupiter – licensed Bristol Jupiter
- Walter Merkur – licensed Bristol Mercury
- Walter Mars – licensed Gnome-Rhône 14M
- Walter Mars I
- Walter Mira R – licensed and developed Pobjoy R
- Walter Mistral K 14 – licensed Gnome-Rhône Mistral Major
- Walter Pegas – licensed Bristol Pegasus
- Walter Polaris
- Walter Pollux
- Walter Regulus
- Walter Sagitta
- Walter Scolar
- Walter Super Castor
- Walter Vega
- Walter Venus

=== Walter (HWK) ===
- Walter RI-201 "Cold" Take Off Pack
- Walter RI-203 "Hot" Take Off Pack
- Walter RII.203
- Walter RII.211
- Walter HWK 109-500
- Walter HWK 109-501
- Walter HWK 109-507
- Walter HWK 109-509
- Walter HWK 109-559
- Walter HWK 109-719
- Walter HWK 109-729 (SV-stoff and R-stoff)
- Walter HWK 109-739
- Walter Heimatschützer I
- Walter Heimatschützer IV
- Walter Me.109 Climb Assister

=== Wankel ===
- Wankel AG LCR – 407 SGti
- Wankel AG LCR – 814 TGti

=== Warbirds-engines ===
(Cesky znalecky institut sro, Prague, Czech Republic)

- Warbirds ASz-62 IR

=== Warner ===
- Warner Scarab/Super Scarab
- Warner Scarab Junior
- Warner R-420
- Warner R-500
- Warner R-550
- Warner 145
- Warner 165
- Warner 185

=== WASAG ===
(Westphalisch-Anhaltische Springstoff A.G.)Source: RMV

- WASAG 109-506
- WASAG 109-512
- WASAG 109-522
- WASAG 109-532

=== Watson ===
(Gary Watson of Newcastle, Texas)

- Watson 917cc 1/2 VW

=== Weir ===
- Weir 2HOA
- Weir 40/50 hp 4IL

=== Weiss ===
(Weiss Manfréd Repülögép- és Motorgyár Rt – Manfréd Weiss Aircraft and Engine works)

- Weiss WM Sh 10 – licence built Siemens-Halske Sh 10
- Weiss WM Sh 11 – licence built Siemens-Halske Sh 11
- Weiss WM Sh 12 – licence built Siemens-Halske Sh 12
- Weiss Sport I 100-130 hp air-cooled 4-cylinder inline engines
- Weiss Sport II 100-130 hp air-cooled 4-cylinder inline engines
- Weiss Sport III 100-130 hp air-cooled 4-cylinder inline engines
- Weiss – Bristol Jupiter VI
- Weiss MW 9K Mistral (520 hp Gnome-Rhône 9Krsd)
- Weiss WM-K-14A (870 hp licence built and modified Gnome-Rhône 14K Mistral Major)
- Weiss WM-K-14B (910 hp and 1030 hp licence built and modified Gnome-Rhône 14K Mistral Major)
- Weiss-Daimler-Benz DB 605B (for Hungarian built Messerschmitt Me 210Ca-1/C-1s).

=== Welch ===
(Welch Aircraft Co)

- Welch O-2 (O-135)

=== Wells & Adams ===
- Wells & Adams 50 hp
- Wells & Adams 135 hp V-8 4.5 in × 6 in (110 mm × 150 mm)

=== Werner ===
- Werner 30 hp 4-cyl in-line

=== Werner & Pfleiderer ===
- Werner & Pfleiderer 90/95 hp 4-cyl inline 130 mm × 150 mm (5.1 in × 5.9 in)
- Werner & Pfleiderer 95 hp 4-cyl inverted inline 130 mm × 150 mm (5.1 in × 5.9 in)
- Werner & Pfleiderer 140/150 hp 6-cyl inline 130 mm × 160 mm (5.1 in × 6.3 in)
- Werner & Pfleiderer 220 hp 8-cyl 130 mm × 150 mm (5.1 in × 5.9 in)

=== Wessex ===
- a 130 hp 6-cylinder in-line 105 mm × 150 mm (4.1 in × 5.9 in)

=== West Engineering ===
- West Engineering XJ38

=== Westermayer ===
(Oskar Westermayer)

- Westermayer W-5-33

=== Western ===
(Western Enterprise Engine Co)

- Western L-7

=== Westinghouse ===
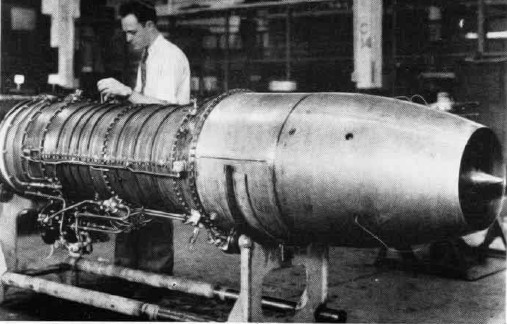
Westinghouse J30

- Westinghouse J30
- Westinghouse J32
- Westinghouse J34
- Westinghouse J40
- Westinghouse J43
- Westinghouse J45
- Westinghouse J46
- Westinghouse J50
- Westinghouse J54
- Westinghouse J74 (none built?)
- Westinghouse J81 (Rolls-Royce Soar)
- Westinghouse T30 (25D)
- Westinghouse T70
- Westinghouse 19XB
- Westinghouse 24C
- Westinghouse 25D (T30)
- Westinghouse 40E
- Westinghouse 9.5A/B

=== Wherry ===
- Wherry 4-cyl rotary barrel engine

=== White & Poppe ===
Source: RMV

- White & Poppe 23 hp 6-cyl in-line
- White & Poppe 130 hp V-8 120 mm × 160 mm (4.7 in × 6.3 in)

=== Whitehead ===
Source: RMV

- Whitehead 1910 40 hp
- Whitehead 1910 75 hp

=== Wickner ===
- Wickner Wicko F

=== Wiley Post ===
- Wiley Post AL-1000

=== Wilksch ===
Source: RMV

- Wilksch WAM100
- Wilksch WAM120
- Wilksch WAM160

=== Williams ===
- a water-cooled 125 hp V-8

=== Williams International ===
Source: RMV

- Williams F107 (WR19)
- Williams F112
- Williams F121
- Williams F122
- Williams F124
- Williams F129 (FJ44)
- Williams F415
- Williams EJ22
- Williams FJ22
- Williams FJ33
- Williams FJ44
- Williams FJX-1
- Williams FJX-2
- Williams J400 (WR24)
- Williams WJ38-5
- Williams WJ119
- Williams WR2
- Williams WR9
- Williams WR19
- Williams WRC19
- Williams WR24
- Williams WR27-1
- Williams WR34
- Williams WR44
- Williams WST117
- Williams WTS34

=== Wills ===
(C. Howard Wills)

- WBB V-4 2-stroke for Sperry aerial torpedo

=== Winterthur ===
(The Swiss Locomotive and machine Works)

- Winterthur V-8
- Winterthur V-12

=== Wisconsin ===
- 140 hp 6-cyl in-line 5 in × 6.5 in (130 mm × 170 mm)
- 250 hp V-125 in × 6.5 in (130 mm × 170 mm)

=== Woelfe Aixro ===
- Woelfe Aixro XF40

=== Wojcicli ===
(S.Wojcicli)

- Wojcicli 10 kg pulsejet
- Wojcicli 20 kg pulsejet
- Wojcicli 40 kg pulsejet
- Wojcicli 70 kg pulsejet
- Wojcicli 11 kg ramjet
- Wojcicli 200 kg ramjet

=== Wolseley ===
Source: Lumsden.

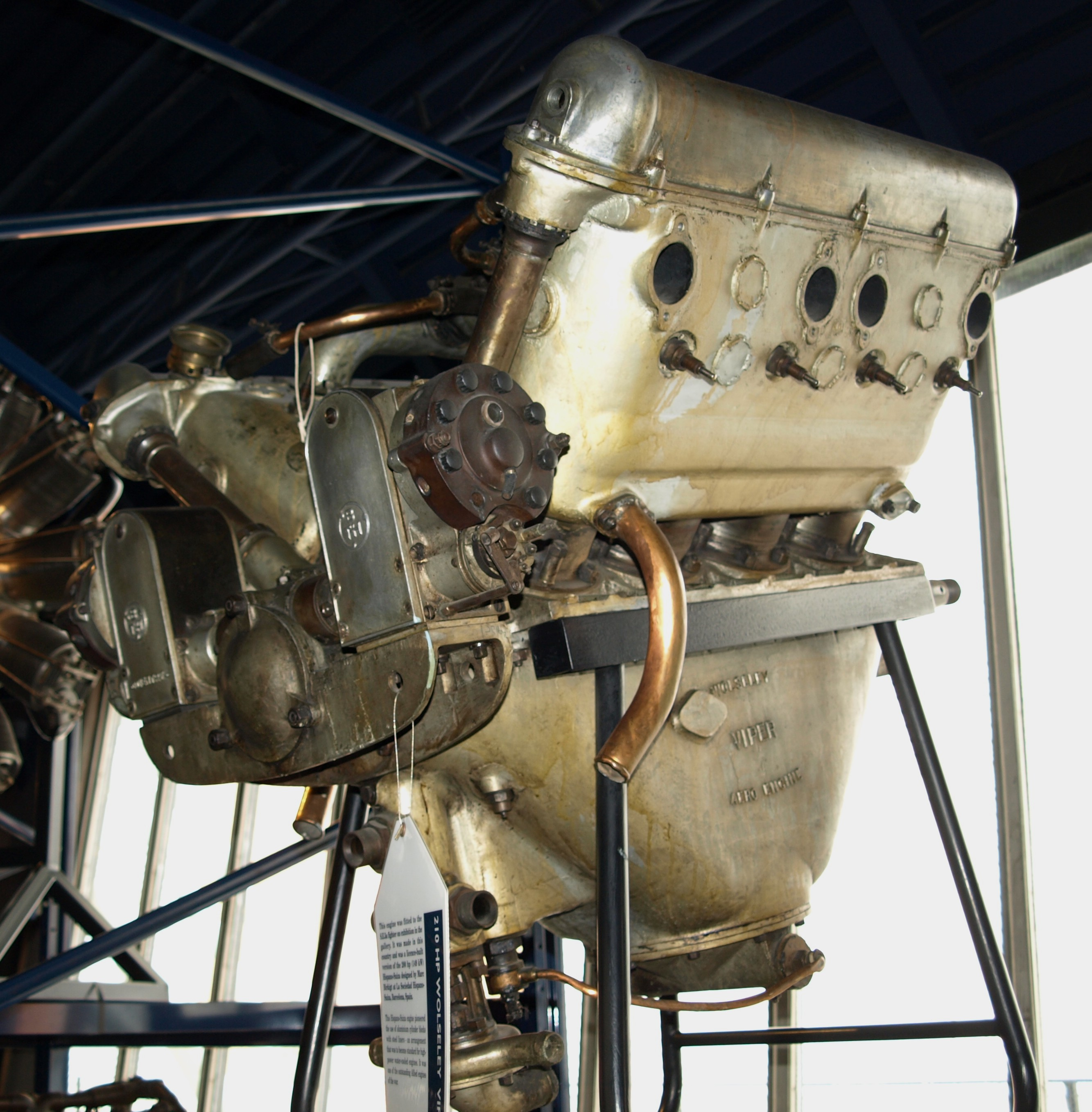
Wolseley Viper on display at the London Science Museum

- Wolseley 30 hp 4-cylinder
- Wolseley 50 hp V-8 air-cooled
- Wolseley 54 hp V-8 water-cooled 3.75 in × 5 in (95 mm × 127 mm)
- Wolseley 60 hp, also known as Type C – V-8 water-cooled 3.75 in × 5 in (95 mm × 127 mm)
  - 80 hp "Type B"
- Wolseley 75 hp V-8 air-cooled 3.75 in × 5.5 in (95 mm × 140 mm)
- Wolseley 90 hp V-8 air-cooled 4 in × 5.5 in (100 mm × 140 mm)
- Wolseley 90 hp V-8 water-cooled 3.75 in × 5.5 in (95 mm × 140 mm)
- Wolseley 120/150 hp V-8 water-cooled 5 in × 7 in (130 mm × 180 mm)
- Wolseley 1911 Type A V-8
- Wolseley 1911 Type D V-8
- Wolseley 160 hp – 1912 V-8
- Wolseley Aquarius, also known as Wolseley AR7
- Wolseley Aries, also known as Wolseley AR9
  - Wolseley Leo
  - Wolseley Libra
  - Wolseley Scorpio
- Wolseley Viper – licence built Hispano Suiza HS-8
  - Wolseley Python 4.72 in × 5.51 in (120 mm × 140 mm)
  - Wolseley Adder

=== Wright ===
- Wright Model 4
- Wright 1903 12 hp
- Wright 32.5 hp 4-cylinder in-line 4.25" x 4.33"
- Wright 30/35 hp 4-cyl in-line 4.375 in × 4 in (111.1 mm × 101.6 mm)
- Wright 50 hp 6-cyl in-line 4.375 in × 4 in (111.1 mm × 101.6 mm)
- Wright 60 hp V-8 4.375 in × 4 in (111.1 mm × 101.6 mm)
- Wright 1910 50-60 hp
- Wright 6-60 60 hp 6IL 4.375 in × 4.5 in (111.1 mm × 114.3 mm)
- Wright R-460
- Wright R-540 Whirlwind
- Wright R-760 Whirlwind
- Wright R-790 Whirlwind
- Wright R-975 Whirlwind
- Wright R-1200 Simoon
- Wright R-1300 Cyclone 7
- Wright R-1454 (R-1)
- Wright R-1510 Whirlwind 14
- Wright R-1670
- Wright R-1750 Cyclone 9
- Wright R-1820 Cyclone
- Wright R-2160 Tornado
- Wright R-2600 Twin Cyclone
- Wright R-3350 Duplex-Cyclone
- Wright R-4090 Cyclone 22
- Wright Gale (from Lawrance L-4)
- Wright V-720
- Wright IV-1460
- Wright IV-1560
- Wright V-1950 Tornado
- Wright H-2120 12 cylinder liquid cooled radial
- Wright XH-4240
- Wright D-1
- Wright F-50 Cyclone
- Wright F-60 Cyclone
- Wright G Cyclone
- Wright G-100
- Wright G-200
- Wright GTC-1
- Wright J-1
- Wright J-3 Whirlwind
- Wright J-4 Whirlwind
- Wright J-5 Whirlwind
- Wright J-6 Whirlwind 5
- Wright J-6 Whirlwind 7
- Wright J-6 Whirlwind 9
- Wright K-2
- Wright P-1
- Wright P-2
- Wright R-1 (R-1454) 5.625 in × 6.5 in (142.9 mm × 165.1 mm)
- Wright T
- Wright T-1
- Wright T-2
- Wright T-3 Tornado
- Wright T-3A Tornado (V-1950)
- Wright T-4
- Wright TJ-6
- Wright TJ-7
- Wright TJA-1
- Wright TJ-38A1 Commercial (Olympus 6)
- Wright TP-51A2
- Wright J51
- Wright J59
- Wright J61
- Wright J65 (Armstrong-Siddeley Sapphire)
- Wright J67 (Bristol Olympus)
- Wright T35 (from Lockheed J37)
- Wright T43
- Wright T47 (Olympus turboprop ~10,500shp)
- Wright T49 (Sapphire turboprop ~6,500–10,380ehp)

=== Wright Company ===
- Wright Vertical 4

=== Wright-Gypsy ===
- Wright-Gypsy L-320

=== Wright-Hisso ===
(Wright-Martin/Wright-Hisso)

- Wright-Hisso A
- Wright-Hisso B 4-cyl in-line water-cooled 56 kW (75 hp) 120 mm × 130 mm (4.7 in × 5.1 in)
- Wright-Hisso C 150 kW (200 hp) geared A
- Wright-Hisso D 150 kW (200 hp) geared A with cannon
- Wright-Hisso E 130 kW (180 hp) (HC 'I')
- Wright-Hisso E-2 (HC 'E')
- Wright-Hisso E-3
- Wright-Hisso E-4
- Wright-Hisso F ('D' without cannon)
- Wright-Hisso H 220 kW (300 hp)
- Wright-Hisso H-2 improved 'H'
- Wright-Hisso I
- Wright-Hisso K H with 37mm Baldwin cannon
- Wright-Hisso K-2
- Wright-Hisso M experimental 300 hp
- Wright-Hisso T
- Wright-Hisso 180 hp V-8 direct drive
- Wright-Hisso 220 hp V-8 geared drive
- Wright-Hisso 300 hp V-8 geared drive

=== Wright-Morehouse ===
- Wright-Morehouse 2-cyl horizontally opposed 26 hp (Lincoln Rocket)

=== Wright-Siemens ===
- Wright-Siemens Sh-14

=== Wright-Tuttle ===
- Wright-Tuttle WT-5

=== Wynne ===
(William Wynne) (The Corvair Authority)

- Wynne O-164B 100 HP
- Wynne O-164-BE 110 HP
- Wynne TSIO-164-BE 145 HP

== X ==
=== XCOR Aerospace ===
- XCOR XR-4A3
- XCOR XR-4K14

=== Xian ===
- Xian WS-9 ("Qinling")
- Xian WS-15 ("Emei")

== Y ==
=== Yamaha ===
- Yamaha KT100

=== York ===
(Jo York)

- York 4-cyl in-line

=== Yuneec International ===
- Yuneec Power Drive 10
- Yuneec Power Drive 20
- Yuneec Power Drive 40
- Yuneec Power Drive 60

== Z ==
=== Zanzottera ===
- Zanzottera MZ 34
- Zanzottera MZ 100
- Zanzottera MZ 201
- Zanzottera MZ 202
- Zanzottera MZ 301
- Zanzottera MZ 313

=== Z.B. ===
(Ceskoslovenska Zbrojovka A.S. Brno / Zbrojovka Brno)

- Z.B. ZOD-260

=== Zeitlin ===
(Joseph Zeitlin)

- Zeitlin 7-cyl rotary 135 mm (5.3 in) bore, variable stroke
- Zeitlin 220 hp (160 kW), 9-cyl rotary, 135 mm (5.3 in) bore, variable stroke 181–226 mm (7.1–8.9 in)

=== Zenoah ===
- Zenoah G-25
- Zenoah G-50
- Zenoah G-72

=== Zhuzhou ===
(Zhuzhou Aeroengine Factory -ZEF now South Motive Power and Machinery Complex (SMPMC))

- ZEF HS-5
- ZEF HS-6
- ZEF WZ-8
- ZEF WZ-9
- ZEF WZ-16

=== Zlin ===
- Zlin Persy
- Zlin Persy II
- Zlin Persy III
- Zlin Toma 4
- Zlin Toma 6

=== Zoche ===
- Zoche Z 01
- Zoche Z 02
- Zoche Z 03
- Zoche Z 04

=== ZOD ===
(Československá zbrojovka Brno – ZOD)

- ZOD-240 (2-stroke radial)
- ZOD-260 (2-stroke radial)

=== Zündapp ===
- Zündapp 9–090
- Zündapp 9-092

== See also ==
- United States military aircraft engine designations
