= Electravia Electro Trike =

French ultralight trike

Electro Trike
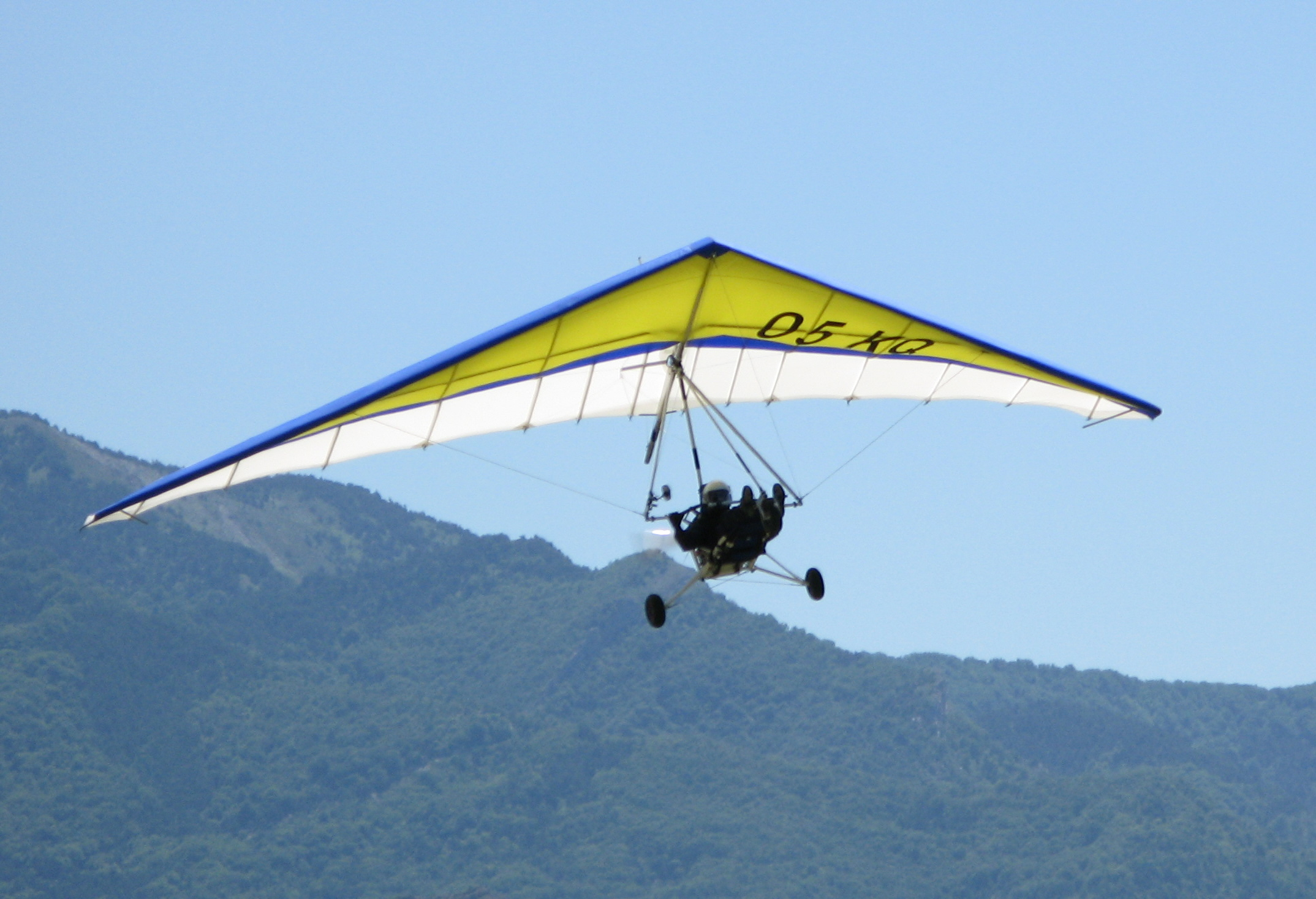

General information
- Type: Ultralight trike
- National origin: France
- Manufacturer: Electravia
- Status: in production
- Number built: 9 (2013)

History
- First flight: June 2008
- Developed from: DTA Alizés

The Electravia Electro Trike is a French electric ultralight trike, produced by Electravia of Alpes de Haute Provence. The aircraft is supplied as a complete ready-to-fly-aircraft.

The Electro Trike prototype was introduced at the first Green Aviation Airshow at Le Bourget in June 2008.

== Design and development ==
The Electro Trike was designed to comply with the Fédération Aéronautique Internationale microlight category and the US FAR 103 Ultralight Vehicles rules. It was first developed by taking the existing DTA Alizés carriage and its Ellipse Fuji wing and replacing the internal combustion engine with an electric motor.

The aircraft features a cable-braced hang glider-style high wing, weight-shift controls, a single-seat open cockpit, tricycle landing gear and a single engine in pusher configuration.

The aircraft is made from bolted-together aluminum tubing, with its single surface wing covered in Dacron sailcloth. Its 10 m (32.8 ft) span wing is supported by a single tube-type kingpost and uses an "A" frame weight-shift control bar. The powerplant is an Electravia GMPE 102 electric motor, producing 26 hp (19 kW). With a single Lithium polymer battery pack the aircraft has an empty weight of 85 kg (187 lb) and a gross weight of 193 kg (425 lb), giving a useful load of 108 kg (238 lb).

The single battery pack gives a flight endurance of one hour, while the addition of a second battery pack allows flights of 1 1/2 hours.

== Specifications (Electro Trike) ==
Data from Bayerl

General characteristics

- Crew: one
- Wingspan: 10 m (32 ft 10 in)
- Wing area: 16 m^{2} (170 sq ft)
- Empty weight: 85 kg (187 lb)
- Gross weight: 193 kg (425 lb)
- Powerplant: 1 × Electravia GMPE 102 electric aircraft engine, powered by a Lithium polymer battery pack, 19 kW (26 hp)
- Propellers: 2-bladed carbon E-Props NG-D

Performance

- Maximum speed: 75 km/h (47 mph, 40 kn)
- Cruise speed: 65 km/h (40 mph, 35 kn)
- Stall speed: 45 km/h (28 mph, 24 kn)
- Rate of climb: 2.5 m/s (490 ft/min)
- Wing loading: 12.1 kg/m^{2} (2.5 lb/sq ft)

== See also ==
- Electravia Monotrace-E
