= Simonini Racing =

Italian automotive and aircraft engine manufacturer

Coordinates: 44.4080345°N 10.8352498°E

Simonini Racing S.r.l.
- Company type: Privately held company
- Industry: Automotive, aerospace
- Headquarters: San Dalmazio di Serramazzoni, Italy
- Products: Piston engines
- Website: www.simonini-racing.com

Simonini Racing S.r.l. is an Italian automotive and aircraft engine manufacturer based in San Dalmazio di Serramazzoni. The company specializes in the design and manufacture of small engines and racing conversion kits for motorcycles and microlight aircraft.

Simonini Racing is organized as a Società a responsabilità limitata, an Italian limited liability company.

The company produces a line of small engines, racing conversion kits, mufflers and parts. Their aircraft engines are all one and two cylinder two-stroke designs and include the 200cc, Mini 2 Evo, Mini 2 Plus, Mini 3, Mini 4 Victor 1 Super, Victor 2 and the Victor 2 Super.

The company's small and lightweight engines have been widely used in smaller ultralight aircraft and especially ultralight trikes such as the AEF Monotrace and powered paragliders, such as the Dynamic Sport Climber Fresh Breeze Simonini, Paraavis Vityaz, Sperwill 2+, Sperwill 3+, Time To Fly Backplane SL and the Walkerjet Simon.

== Engines ==
Simonini Racing's aviation engine logo

Summary of engines built by Simonini Racing
Model name	Power	Type
Simonini 200cc	21 hp (16 kW)	Two-stroke, air-cooled aircraft engine
Simonini Mini 2 Evo	33 hp (25 kW)	Two-stroke, air-cooled aircraft engine
Simonini Mini 2 Plus	28 hp (21 kW)	Two-stroke, air-cooled aircraft engine
Simonini Mini 3	33 hp (25 kW)	Two-stroke, air-cooled aircraft engine
Simonini Mini 4	20 hp (15 kW)	Two-stroke, air-cooled aircraft engine
Simonini Victor 1 Super	54 hp (40 kW)	Two-stroke, liquid-cooled aircraft engine
Simonini Victor 2	92 hp (69 kW)	Two-stroke, liquid-cooled aircraft engine
Simonini Victor 2 Plus	102 hp (76 kW)	Two-stroke, liquid-cooled aircraft engine
Simonini Victor 2 Super	102 hp (76 kW)	Two-stroke, liquid-cooled aircraft engine
