= Electravia GMPE 205 =

French electric aircraft engine

GMPE 205
- Type: Electric aircraft engine
- National origin: France
- Manufacturer: Electravia

The Electravia GMPE 205 is a French electric motor for powering electric aircraft, designed and produced by Electravia of Vaumeilh.

By April 2018, the engine was no longer advertised on the company website and seems to be out of production.

== Design and development ==
The GMPE 205 is a brushed 111 volt design producing 37 kW (50 hp), with a disk collector. It has a 93% efficiency and uses a poly V-belt reduction drive.

== Specifications (GMPE 205) ==
Data from Tacke

=== General characteristics ===
- Type: brushed electric aircraft engine
- Length: 182 mm (7.2 in)
- Diameter: 206 mm (8.1 in)
- Dry weight: 14.7 kg (32.4 lb)

=== Components ===
- Coil type: Disk collector
- Reduction gear: poly V-belt

=== Performance ===
- Power output: 37 kW (50 hp)
- Voltage: 111V nominal
- Best efficiency: 93%
- Power-to-weight ratio: 2.5 kW/kg

== See also ==
- Electravia GMPE 102
- Electravia GMPE 104

Related lists

- List of aircraft engines
