= Simonini Victor 1 Super =

Italian aircraft engine

Victor 1 Super
- Type: Aircraft engine
- National origin: Italy
- Manufacturer: Simonini Racing

The Simonini Victor 1 Super is an Italian aircraft engine, designed and produced by Simonini Racing of San Dalmazio di Serramazzoni for use in ultralight aircraft.

== Design and development ==
The Victor 1 Super is a single cylinder two-stroke, liquid-cooled, petrol engine design, with a poly V belt reduction drive with reduction ratios of 2.70:1, 2.80:1 and 3.00:1. It employs dual capacitor discharge ignition electronic ignition and produces 54 hp (40 kW) at 6200 rpm.

== Specifications (Victor 1 Super) ==
Data from World Directory of Leisure Aviation 2011-12

=== General characteristics ===
- Type: Single cylinder, two stroke aircraft engine
- Bore: 80 mm (3.1 in)
- Stroke: 76 mm (3.0 in)
- Displacement: 401 cc (24.5 cu in)
- Length: 320 mm (12.6 in)
- Width: 340 mm (13.4 in)
- Height: 350 mm (13.8 in)
- Dry weight: 32 kg (70.5 lb)

=== Components ===
- Fuel type: petrol
- Cooling system: liquid
- Reduction gear: poly V belt reduction drive, reduction ratios of 2.70:1, 2.80:1 and 3.00:1

=== Performance ===
- Power output: 54 hp (40 kW) at 6200 rpm
- Compression ratio: 9.5:1

== See also ==
Related lists

- List of aircraft engines
