= Victor II =

Victor II may refer to:

- Pope Victor II
- Victor II (bishop of Chur)
- Victor II, Prince of Anhalt-Bernburg-Schaumburg-Hoym
- Victor II, Duke of Ratibor
- Victor Amadeus II, King of Sardinia
- Victor Amadeus II, Prince of Carignano
- Victor Emmanuel II, King of Italy
- Victor-class submarine
- Simonini Victor 2, an Italian aircraft engine
