= Aurore MB 02-2 Mini Bulle =

French ultralight aircraft

MB 02-2 Mini Bulle

General information
- Type: Ultralight aircraft
- National origin: France
- Manufacturer: Aurore Sarl
- Designer: Michel Barry
- Status: In production

History
- Developed from: Aurore MB 02 Souricette

The Aurore MB 02-2 Mini Bulle (English: Mini Bubble) is a French ultralight aircraft, designed by Michel Barry and produced by Aurore Sarl of Sauvagnon. The aircraft is supplied as a kit or as plans for amateur construction.

== Design and development ==
The Mini Bulle was designed to comply with the Fédération Aéronautique Internationale microlight rules and is an evolution of the Aurore MB 02 Souricette with a more modern look as opposed to the MB 02's antique 1920s appearance. The Mini Bulle features a strut-braced shoulder-wing, a single-seat enclosed cockpit under a bubble canopy, fixed conventional landing gear and a single engine in tractor configuration.

The aircraft is made from wood with its flying surfaces covered in doped aircraft fabric. Its 9 m (29.5 ft) span wing employs single supporting struts. The standard recommended engine is the 18 hp (13 kW) Hirth F23 two-stroke powerplant or the JPX 505. Differences with the earlier MB 02 include longer main landing gear legs to allow more propeller clearance and an aerodynamic cowling.

In 2015 the aircraft kit was €6,000 and plans sold for €230.

== Specifications (MB 02-2 Mini Bulle) ==
Data from Bayerl and Tacke

General characteristics

- Crew: one
- Wingspan: 9 m (29 ft 6 in)
- Wing area: 10 m^{2} (110 sq ft)
- Empty weight: 130 kg (287 lb)
- Gross weight: 220 kg (485 lb)
- Fuel capacity: 20 litres (4.4 imp gal; 5.3 US gal)
- Powerplant: 1 × Hirth F23 single cylinder, air-cooled, two stroke aircraft engine, 13 kW (18 hp)
- Propellers: 2-bladed wooden

Performance

- Maximum speed: 140 km/h (87 mph, 76 kn)
- Cruise speed: 125 km/h (78 mph, 67 kn)
- Stall speed: 60 km/h (37 mph, 32 kn)
- Rate of climb: 1.7 m/s (330 ft/min)
- Wing loading: 22.0 kg/m^{2} (4.5 lb/sq ft)
