= Aurore Sarl =

French light aircraft manufacturer

- The Aurore Sarl logo, doing business as Air Souris Set
- Company type: Privately held company
- Industry: Aerospace
- Founded: late 1990s
- Founder: Michel Barry
- Headquarters: Sauvagnon, France
- Products: Kit aircraft
- Website: air-souris-set.fr

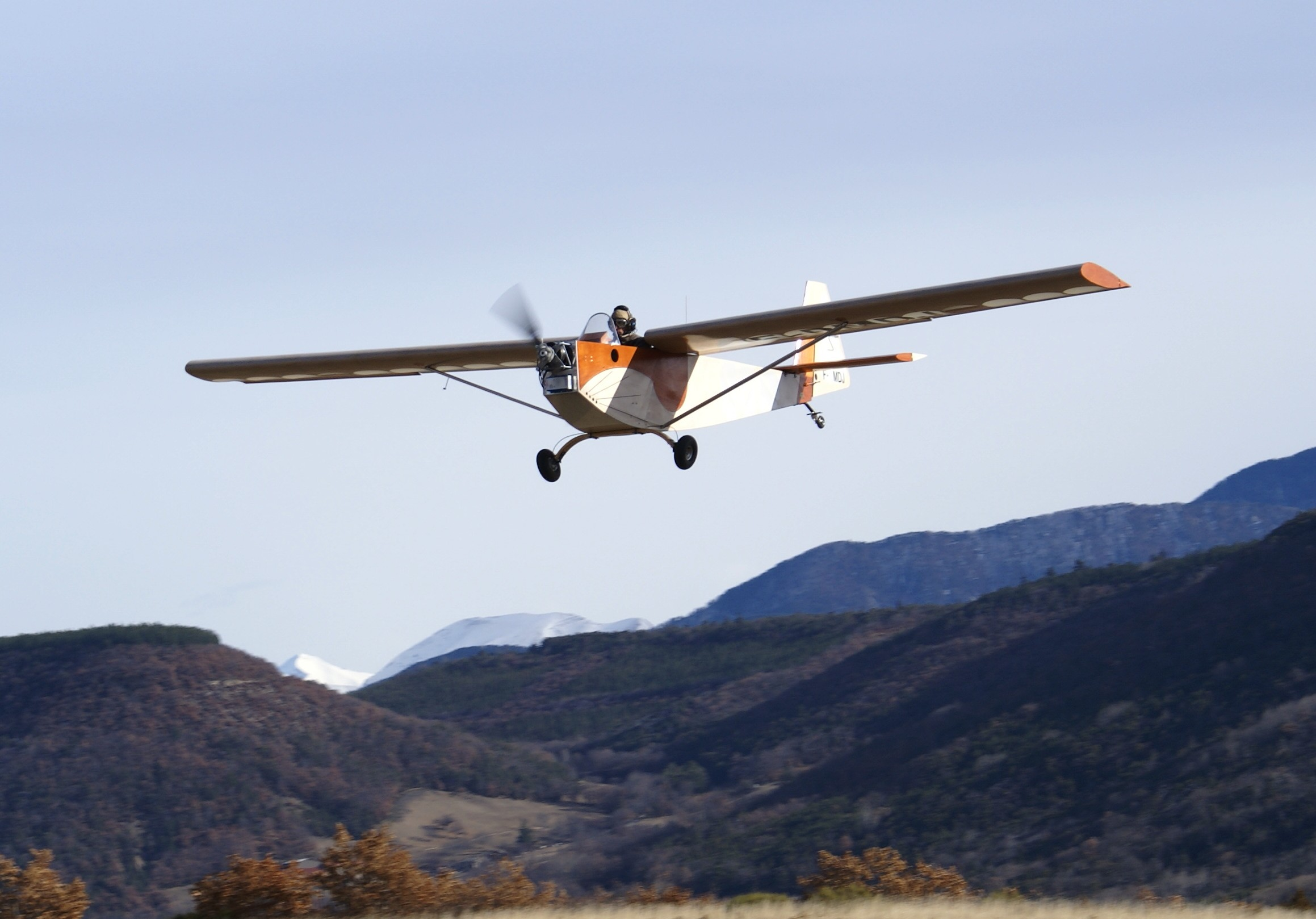
An Aurore MB 02 Souricette powered by an electric motor and batteries and designated as the BL1E Electra.

Aurore Sarl (English: Aurora) is a French aircraft manufacturer based in Sauvagnon, founded by Michel Barry in the late 1990s. The company specializes in the design and manufacture of light aircraft in the form of kits for amateur construction.

The company is a French Société à responsabilité limitée (Sarl), a private limited company.

The company produces a series of wood and aircraft fabric aircraft under the trade name Air Souris Set (English: Flying Mouse Collection). The line includes the Aurore MB 04 Souris Bulle two-seater, as well as the Aurore MB 02 Souricette and Aurore MB 02-2 Mini Bulle single-seater ultralights.

The Aurore MB 02 Souricette has also been flown as an all-electric aircraft, designated as the BL1E Electra. It was first flown on 23 December 2007 at Aspres sur Buech airfield, in Hautes Alpes, France.

== Aircraft ==
Summary of aircraft built by Aurore Sarl
Model name	First flight	Number built	Type
Aurore MB 02 Souricette			Single seat ultralight
Aurore MB 02-2 Mini Bulle			Single-seat ultralight
Aurore MB 04 Souris Bulle	circa 1998		Two-seat ultralight
