= Ellipse (manufacturer) =

French aircraft manufacturer

- Industry: Aerospace
- Headquarters: Étuz, France
- Products: hang gliders ultralight trikes
- Website: ellipse-delta.com

Ellipse is a French aircraft manufacturer, located in Étuz. The company specializes in building hang gliders and ultralight trikes.

The company also builds the DTA Diva, DTA Dynamic and DTA Magic ultralight trike wings under contract to DTA sarl.

== Aircraft ==
Logo used circa 2012

Summary of aircraft built by Ellipse
Model name	First flight	Number built	Type
Ellipse Fuji			hang glider
Ellipse Sol'R			hang glider
Ellipse Titan			hang glider
Ellipse Twist			hang glider
Ellipse Windigo			hang glider
Ellipse Zenith			hang glider
Ellipse Alizé			ultralight trike
