= Aurore MB 02 Souricette =

French ultralight aircraft

MB 02 Souricette
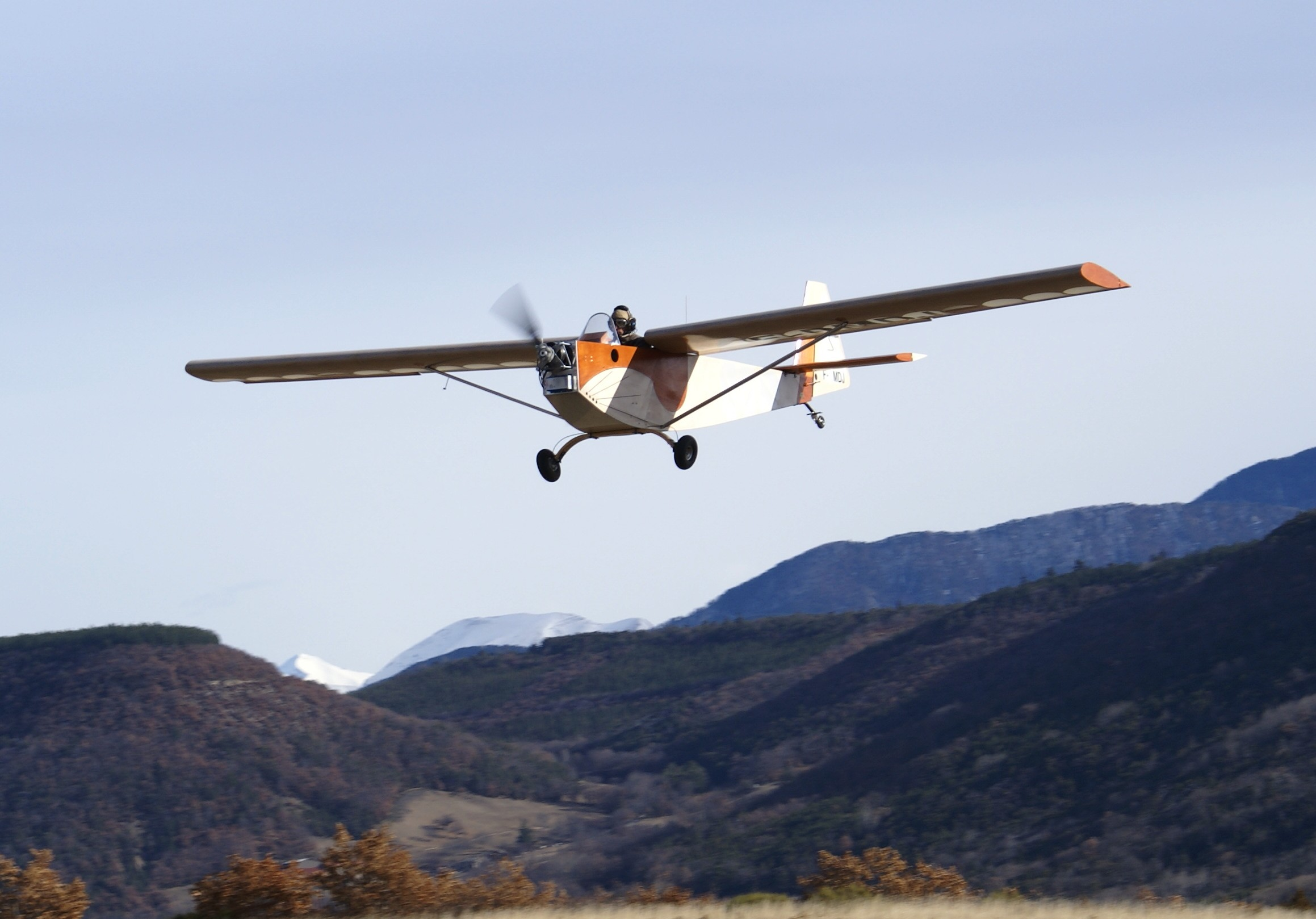
- French BL1E Souricette - Electra electric aircraft on its first flight in Dec, 2007

General information
- Type: Ultralight aircraft
- National origin: France
- Manufacturer: Aurore Sarl
- Designer: Michel Barry
- Status: In production
- Number built: 60 (2015)

History
- Variant: Aurore MB 02-2 Mini Bulle

The Aurore MB 02 Souricette (English: Little Mouse) is a French ultralight aircraft, designed by Michel Barry and produced by Aurore Sarl of Sauvagnon. The aircraft is supplied as a kit or as plans for amateur construction.

== Design and development ==
The Souricette was designed to comply with the Fédération Aéronautique Internationale microlight rules, as well as US FAR Part 103 Ultralight Vehicles rules and resembles an antique 1920s aircraft. The aircraft features a strut-braced shoulder-wing, a single-seat open cockpit, fixed conventional landing gear and a single engine in tractor configuration.

The aircraft is made from wood with its flying surfaces covered in doped aircraft fabric. Its 9 m (29.5 ft) span wing employs single supporting struts. The standard recommended engine is the 18 hp (13 kW) JPX PUL 425 two-stroke powerplant or the JPX PUL 505. The aircraft was later developed into the more modern-looking Aurore MB 02-2 Mini Bulle.

In 2015 the aircraft kit was €2,660 and plans sold for €150.

The Souricette has also been flown as an all-electric aircraft. On Sunday, 23 December 2007, the Electravia team and the association APAME first flew its Souricette electric-powered open-cockpit airplane at Aspres sur Buech airfield, Hautes Alpes, France. This Souricette was a special BL1E model and called "Electra" for this occasion. Test pilot Christian Vandamme flew for 48 minutes, covering 50 km (31 mi). This aircraft is powered by an 18-kW (24 hp) electric engine driven by a 47 kg (104 lb) KOKAM Lithium polymer battery.

== Operational history ==
More than 200 sets of plans has been sold by 2015 and 60 aircraft were reported flying in France.

Reviewer Marino Boric described the design in a 2015 review as "simple to build and with attractive idiosyncratic looks, its only drawback is that the cockpit is a little small."

== Specifications (MB 02 Souricette) ==
Data from Bayerl and Tacke

General characteristics

- Crew: one
- Wingspan: 9 m (29 ft 6 in)
- Wing area: 10.1 m^{2} (109 sq ft)
- Empty weight: 120 kg (265 lb)
- Gross weight: 200 kg (441 lb)
- Fuel capacity: 20 litres (4.4 imp gal; 5.3 US gal)
- Powerplant: 1 × JPX PUL 425 twin cylinder, horizontally-opposed air-cooled, two stroke aircraft engine, 19 kW (26 hp)
- Propellers: 2-bladed wooden

Performance

- Maximum speed: 140 km/h (87 mph, 76 kn)
- Cruise speed: 105 km/h (65 mph, 57 kn)
- Stall speed: 55 km/h (34 mph, 30 kn)
- Rate of climb: 1.5 m/s (300 ft/min)
