= Simonini Mini 4 =

Italian aircraft engine

Mini 4
- Type: Aircraft engine
- National origin: Italy
- Manufacturer: Simonini Racing

The Simonini Mini 4 is an Italian aircraft engine, designed and produced by Simonini Racing of San Dalmazio di Serramazzoni for use in ultralight aircraft.

== Design and development ==
The Mini 4 is a single cylinder two-stroke, air-cooled, petrol engine design, with a poly V belt reduction drive with reduction ratios of 2.56:1 and 2.78:1. It employs capacitor discharge ignition electronic ignition and produces 20 hp (15 kW) at 7200 rpm.

== Specifications (Mini 4) ==
Data from World Directory of Leisure Aviation 2011-12

=== General characteristics ===
- Type: Single Twin cylinder, two stroke aircraft engine
- Bore: 61 mm (2.4 in)
- Stroke: 54 mm (2.1 in)
- Displacement: 160 cc (9.8 cu in)
- Length: 300 mm (11.8 in)
- Width: 400 mm (15.7 in)
- Height: 200 mm (7.9 in)
- Dry weight: 11 kg (24.3 lb)

=== Components ===
- Fuel type: petrol
- Cooling system: air
- Reduction gear: poly V belt reduction drive, reduction ratios of 2.56:1 and 2.78:1

=== Performance ===
- Power output: 20 hp (15 kW) at 7200 rpm
- Compression ratio: 10:1

== See also ==
Related lists

- List of aircraft engines
