= DTA Feeling =

French ultralight trike

Feeling
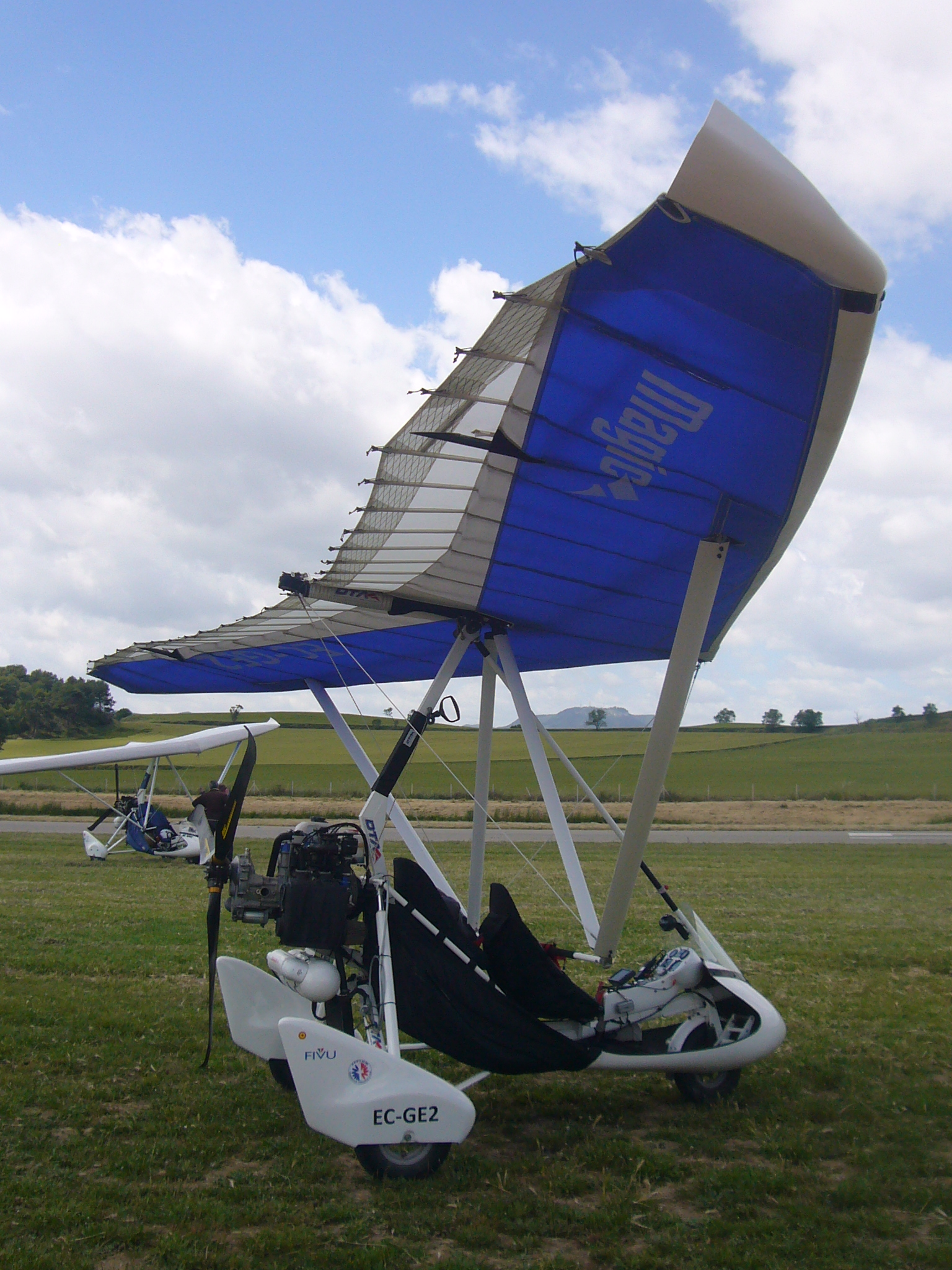
- DTA Feeling at the Aerosport air show in 2013

General information
- Type: Ultralight trike
- National origin: France
- Manufacturer: DTA sarl
- Status: In production (2013)

The DTA Feeling is a French ultralight trike, designed and produced by DTA sarl of Montélimar. The aircraft is supplied complete and ready-to-fly.

== Design and development ==
The aircraft has a great deal of parts commonality with the DTA Evolution, but includes a cockpit fairing, windshield, panniers, and a standard instrumentation package. The Feeling was designed to comply with the Fédération Aéronautique Internationale microlight category, including the category's maximum gross weight of 450 kg (992 lb). The aircraft has a maximum gross weight of 450 kg (992 lb). It features a cable-braced hang glider-style DTA Diva high-wing, weight-shift controls, a two-seats-in-tandem open cockpit, tricycle landing gear with wheel pants and a single engine in pusher configuration.

The aircraft is made from bolted-together aluminum tubing, with its double surface wing covered in Dacron sailcloth. Its 9.40 m (30.8 ft) span wing is supported by a single tube-type kingpost and uses an "A" frame weight-shift control bar. The powerplant is a twin cylinder, liquid-cooled, two-stroke, dual-ignition 64 hp (48 kW) Rotax 582 engine, with the four cylinder, air and liquid-cooled, four-stroke, dual-ignition 80 hp (60 kW) Rotax 912 or 100 hp (75 kW) Rotax 912S engines optional.

With the Rotax 582 engine, the aircraft has an empty weight of 200 kg (441 lb) and a gross weight of 450 kg (992 lb), giving a useful load of 250 kg (551 lb). With full fuel of 75 litres (16 imp gal; 20 US gal) the payload is 196 kg (432 lb).

A number of different wings can be fitted to the basic carriage as well as the Diva wing, including the DTA Dynamic, and the strut-braced DTA Magic.

== Specifications (Feeling 582 Diva) ==
Data from Bayerl

General characteristics

- Crew: one
- Capacity: one passenger
- Wing area: 12.0 m^{2} (129 sq ft)
- Empty weight: 200 kg (441 lb)
- Gross weight: 450 kg (992 lb)
- Fuel capacity: 75 litres (16 imp gal; 20 US gal)
- Powerplant: 1 × Rotax 582 twin cylinder, liquid-cooled, two stroke aircraft engine, 48 kW (64 hp)
- Propellers: 3-bladed composite

Performance

- Maximum speed: 140 km/h (87 mph, 76 kn)
- Cruise speed: 100 km/h (62 mph, 54 kn)
- Stall speed: 60 km/h (37 mph, 32 kn)
- Rate of climb: 4 m/s (790 ft/min)
- Wing loading: 37.5 kg/m^{2} (7.7 lb/sq ft)
