= Aurore MB 04 Souris Bulle =

French ultralight aircraft

MB 04 Souris Bulle

General information
- Type: Ultralight aircraft
- National origin: France
- Manufacturer: Aurore Sarl
- Designer: Michel Barry
- Status: In production

History
- Introduction date: circa 1998

The Aurore MB 04 Souris Bulle (English: Bubble Mouse) is a French ultralight aircraft, designed by Michel Barry and produced by Aurore Sarl of Sauvagnon. The aircraft is supplied as a kit or as plans for amateur construction.

== Design and development ==
The Souris Bulle was designed to comply with the Fédération Aéronautique Internationale microlight rules. The aircraft features a strut-braced high-wing, a two-seats-in-tandem enclosed cockpit under a bubble canopy, fixed conventional landing gear and a single engine in tractor configuration. The rear seat has very limited visibility.

The aircraft is made from wood with its flying surfaces covered in doped aircraft fabric. Its 11.25 m (36.9 ft) span wing employs single supporting struts. The standard recommended engine is the 60 hp (45 kW) JPX 4T two-stroke powerplant or a 45 hp (34 kW) Volkswagen air-cooled engine. The Souris Bulle has a glide ratio of 18:1.

The standard day, sea level, no wind, take off with a 45 hp (34 kW) engine is 52 m (171 ft) and the landing roll is 91 m (299 ft).

In 2015 the aircraft kit was €13,300 and plans sold for €380. The manufacturer estimates the construction time from the supplied kit as 650 hours.

== Specifications (MB 04 Souris Bulle) ==
Data from Bayerl and Purdy

General characteristics

- Crew: one
- Capacity: one passenger
- Length: 7.92 m (26 ft 0 in)
- Wingspan: 11.25 m (36 ft 11 in)
- Wing area: 15 m^{2} (160 sq ft)
- Empty weight: 250 kg (551 lb)
- Gross weight: 450 kg (992 lb)
- Fuel capacity: 50 litres (11 imp gal; 13 US gal)
- Powerplant: 1 × JPX 4T four cylinder, air-cooled, four stroke aircraft engine, 45 kW (60 hp)
- Propellers: 2-bladed wooden

Performance

- Maximum speed: 170 km/h (110 mph, 92 kn)
- Cruise speed: 140 km/h (87 mph, 76 kn)
- Stall speed: 60 km/h (33 mph, 29 kn)
- Maximum glide ratio: 18:1
- Rate of climb: 4 m/s (790 ft/min)
