= Simonini Mini 2 Evo =

Italian aircraft engine

Mini 2 Evo
- Type: Aircraft engine
- National origin: Italy
- Manufacturer: Simonini Racing

The Simonini Mini 2 Evo is an Italian aircraft engine, designed and produced by Simonini Racing of San Dalmazio di Serramazzoni for use in ultralight aircraft.

== Design and development ==
The Mini 2 Evo is a single cylinder two-stroke, air-cooled, petrol engine design, with a poly V belt reduction drive with reduction ratios of 2.3:1 or 3.0:1. It employs capacitor discharge ignition and produces 33 hp (25 kW) at 8000 rpm.

== Applications ==
- Paraavis Vityaz

== Specifications (Mini 2 Evo) ==
Data from World Directory of Leisure Aviation 2011-12

=== General characteristics ===
- Type: Single cylinder, two stroke aircraft engine
- Bore: 70 mm (2.8 in)
- Stroke: 60 mm (2.4 in)
- Displacement: 231 cc (14.1 cu in)
- Length: 260 mm (10.2 in)
- Width: 330 mm (13.0 in)
- Height: 428 mm (16.9 in)
- Dry weight: 19.3 kg (42.5 lb)

=== Components ===
- Fuel type: petrol
- Cooling system: air
- Reduction gear: Poly V belt

=== Performance ===
- Power output: 33 hp (25 kW) at 8000 rpm
- Compression ratio: 10:1

== See also ==
Related lists

- List of aircraft engines
