= Simonini 200cc =

Italian aircraft engine

- Type: Single cylinder, two-stroke, air-cooled aircraft engine
- National origin: Italy
- Manufacturer: Simonini
- Major applications: Fresh Breeze Simonini

The Simonini 200cc is an Italian single cylinder, two-stroke, air-cooled aircraft engine produced by Simonini Racing of San Dalmazio di Serramazzoni. The engine is used to power paramotors.

== Applications ==
- Fresh Breeze Simonini

== Specifications (200cc) ==
Data from Fresh Breeze

=== General characteristics ===
- Type: single cylinder, two-stroke, aircraft engine
- Displacement: 200 cc (12.2 cu in)

=== Components ===
- Fuel system: Bing 32/WB 37 carburetor
- Cooling system: free air

=== Performance ===
- Power output: 15.5 kW (21 hp)
- Fuel consumption: 2.5 litres (0.55 imp gal; 0.66 US gal) per hour
