= Electravia =

French aerospace manufacturer

Electravia Hélices E-Props
- Industry: Aerospace
- Founded: Sept 2008
- Founder: Anne Lavrand
- Headquarters: Vaumeilh, France
- Key people: Jérémie Buiatti
- Products: Carbon propellers for aviation
- Number of employees: 67 (December 2025)
- Website: www.e-props.fr

Electravia - Helices E-Props is a French aviation manufacturer based in Vaumeilh, specializing in the non-certified light aviation sector. At one time it produced electric propulsion systems and now designs and manufactures carbon fibre propellers for light aircraft.

== History ==
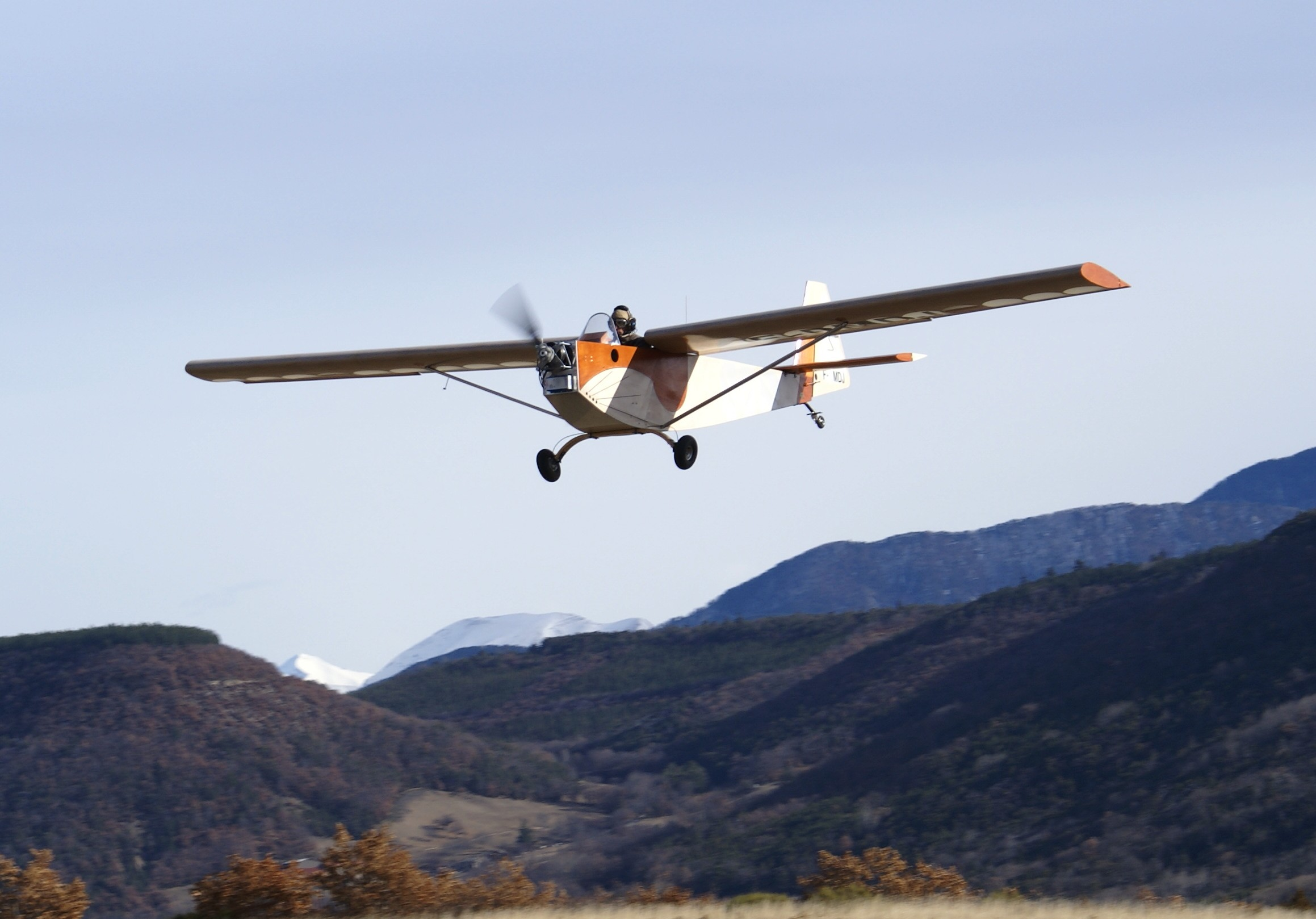
French BL1E Electra F-PMDJ: the first registered electric aircraft in the world. First flight December 2007

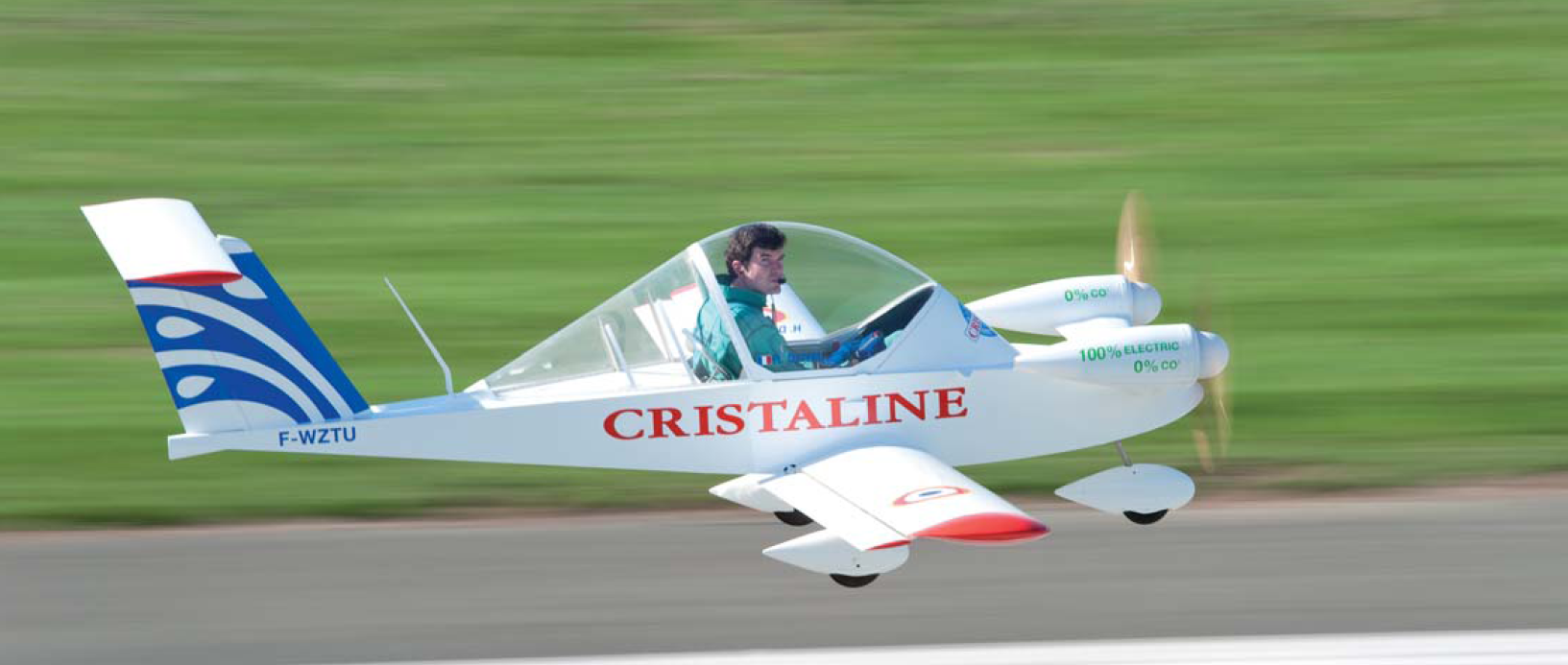
The electric MC15E Cri-Cri during world speed record in Pontoise

Former logo used until 2021

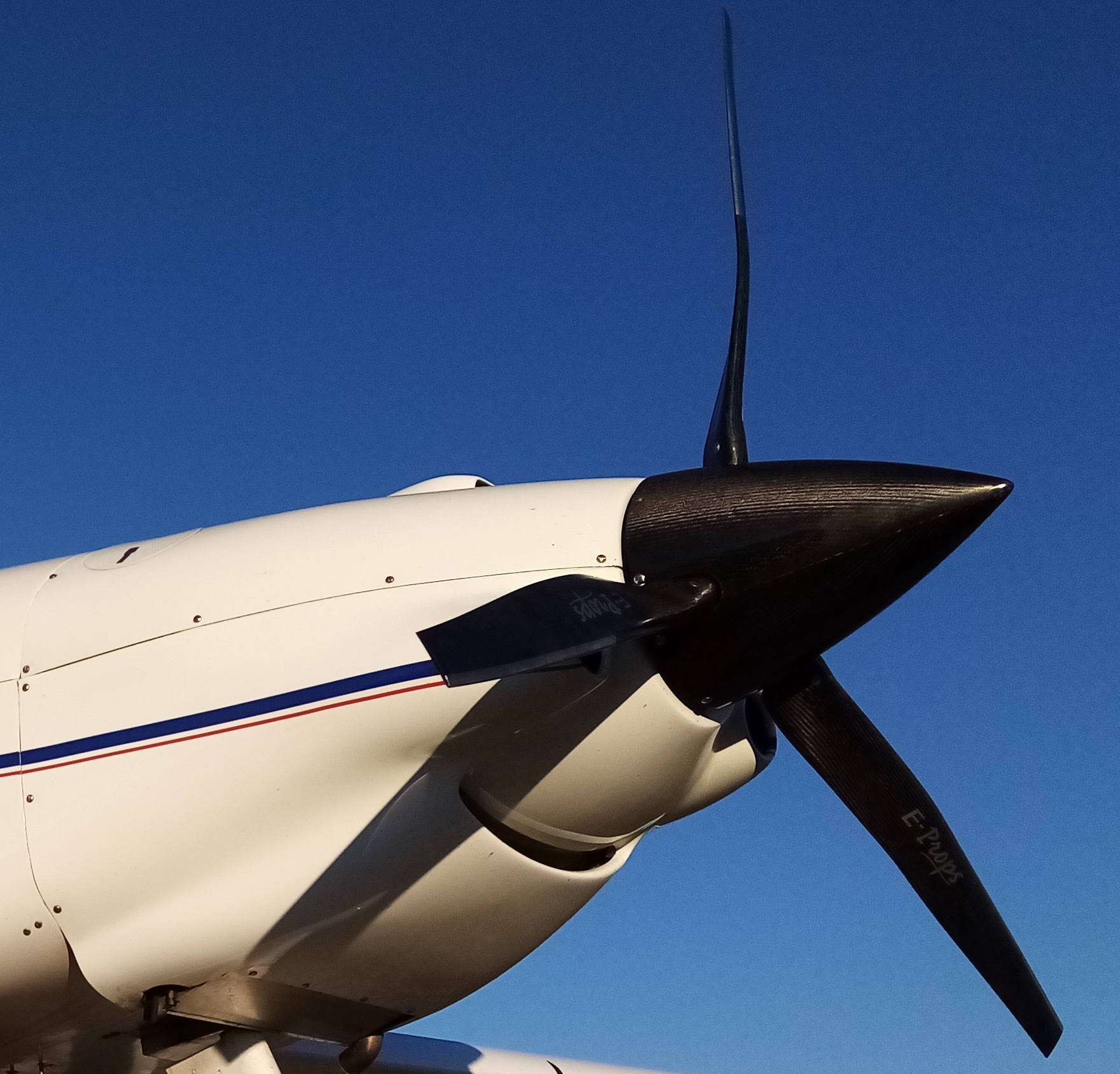
E-Props Glorieuse model variable pitch propeller

The company initially designed and manufactured electric motors for electric aircraft. It first flew its BL1E Electra on Sunday, 23 December 2007 at Aspres sur Buech airfield, Hautes Alpes, France. Test pilot Christian Vandamme flew the electric-powered, open-cockpit, strut-equipped airplane for 48 minutes, covering 50 km (31 mi). The BL1E Electra is powered by an 18 kW (24 hp) disk-brushed electric engine driven by a 47 kg (104 lb) KOKAM Lithium polymer battery. The BL1E Electra was the first registered aircraft in the world powered by an electric motor running on batteries.

The company was founded on 19 September 2008 by Anne Lavrand, Jérémie Buiatti and Christian Vandamme. At the time of its founding it mainly produced electric motors for light aircraft.

Starting in 2008, Electravia began designing and manufacturing carbon fibre aircraft propellers, including fixed pitch, ground-adjustable pitch and variable pitch models. Propellers for paramotors, ultralights, light aircraft and UAV are made in the 1,700 m^{2} (18,000 sq ft) workshop on Sisteron's airfield (LFNS). E-Props propellers claim to be the lightest on the market.

On 5 September 2010, pilot Hugues Duval established a world speed record for electric aircraft with his twin engined MC15E Cri-Cri E-Cristaline, equipped with Electravia engines, controllers, batteries and propellers. During the Pontoise Air show, a top speed of 262 km/h (163 mph; 141 kn) was recorded by Aero Club de France organizers. Then, on 25 June 2011, during the official flight presentation at 2011 Paris Air Show (Salon du Bourget), Duval established a new world record of 283 km/h (176 mph).

In 2011 the E-FENIX became the first 100% electric two-seater paramotor.

In 2012 the E-SPIDER was shown at the Mondial of Paramotors in Basse-Ham. It was the first two-seater electric paramotor capable of being foot-launched.

By the beginning of 2014, about 70 aircraft had been equipped with Electravia propulsion systems, including the ElectroLight2 electric motorglider, based on the Scheibe Spatz and the MC30E Firefly, with which Pilot Jean-Louis Soullier set a speed record of 189.87 km/h (117.98 mph).

By 2014 the company was producing a range of electric aircraft engines, including the Electravia GMPE 102, Electravia GMPE 104 and the Electravia GMPE 205.

Electravia also produced a number of electric-powered ultralight trike designs, including the Electravia Electro Trike and the Electravia Monotrace-E, which was based on the AEF Monotrace.

In 2014, the company decided to stop making electric motors to focus on the design of carbon fibre propellers.

On 9 July 2015, the electric MC15E CriCri E-Cristaline became the first electric aircraft to cross the English Channel.

By 2019, the propeller market for paramotors represented 40% of the company's sales. The company sold 4,500 models in over 80 countries.

At the end of 2022, Electravia began the process of certifying the company and its propellers in accordance with EASA standards (DOA / CS-P / PART 21G).

On March 2, 2023, EASA validated E-Props' first certified propeller: Type Certificate No. EASA P.512, model E-Props EPGU3.

By 2021, the company had 40 aeronautical engineers and technicians and was producing 45,000 propeller blades per year and had started work to certify its propellers and production methods to European Union Aviation Safety Agency standards (DOA / CS-P / PART 21G).

As of 2022, E-Props propellers are fitted to 220 different light aircraft and microlight models and 150 brands of paramotors. The company works directly with 35 major aircraft and microlight manufacturers to design its products. It exports 87% of its propeller production to 80 countries.

At the end of 2025, the company completed the construction of a fifth industrial building on its production site. With a surface area of 1,000 m², this brings the total surface area of the factory to 8,200 m².
