= Simonini Mini 2 Plus =

Italian aircraft engine

Mini 2 Plus
- Type: Aircraft engine
- National origin: Italy
- Manufacturer: Simonini Racing
- Major applications: AEF Monotrace

The Simonini Mini 2 Plus is an Italian aircraft engine, designed and produced by Simonini Racing of San Dalmazio di Serramazzoni for use in ultralight aircraft.

== Design and development ==
The Mini 2 Plus is a single cylinder two-stroke, air-cooled, petrol engine design, with a poly V belt reduction drive with reduction ratios of 2.3:1 and 2.4:1. It employs capacitor discharge ignition and produces 28 hp (21 kW) at 7200 rpm.

== Applications ==
- AEF Monotrace
- Dynamic Sport Climber
- Paraavis Vityaz
- Sperwill 2+
- Time To Fly Backplane SL
- Walkerjet Simon

== Specifications (Mini 2 Plus) ==
Data from World Directory of Leisure Aviation 2011-12

=== General characteristics ===
- Type: Single cylinder, two stroke aircraft engine
- Bore: 66 mm (2.6 in)
- Stroke: 58 mm (2.3 in)
- Displacement: 202 cc (12.3 cu in)
- Length: 246 mm (9.7 in)
- Width: 293 mm (11.5 in)
- Height: 446 mm (17.6 in)
- Dry weight: 14 kg (30.9 lb)

=== Components ===
- Fuel type: petrol
- Cooling system: air
- Reduction gear: poly V belt reduction drive, reduction ratios of 2.3:1 and 2.4:1

=== Performance ===
- Power output: 28 hp (21 kW) at 7200
- Compression ratio: 10.5:1

== See also ==
Related lists

- List of aircraft engines
