= Simonini Mini 3 =

Italian aircraft engine

Mini 3
- Type: Aircraft engine
- National origin: Italy
- Manufacturer: Simonini Racing
- Major applications: AEF Monotrace

The Simonini Mini 3 is an Italian aircraft engine, designed and produced by Simonini Racing of San Dalmazio di Serramazzoni for use in ultralight aircraft.

== Design and development ==
The Mini 3 is a single cylinder twin-cylinder, two-stroke, air liquid-cooled, gasoline engine design, with a poly V belt reduction drive with reduction ratios of 2.49:1, 2.57:1 and 2.76:1. It employs electronic ignition and produces 33 hp (25 kW) at 7000 rpm.

== Applications ==
- AEF Monotrace
- Sperwill 3+
- Rev UL Trike

== Specifications (Mini 3) ==
Data from World Directory of Leisure Aviation 2011-12

=== General characteristics ===
- Type: Single cylinder, two stroke aircraft engine
- Bore: 73 mm (2.9 in)
- Stroke: 65 mm (2.6 in)
- Displacement: 270 cc (16.5 cu in)
- Length: 256 mm (10.1 in)
- Width: 375 mm (14.8 in)
- Height: 498 mm (19.6 in)
- Dry weight: 20 kg (44.1 lb)

=== Components ===
- Fuel type: gasoline
- Cooling system: air
- Reduction gear: poly V belt reduction drive, reduction ratios of 2.49:1, 2.57:1 and 2.76:1

=== Performance ===
- Power output: 33 hp (25 kW) at 7000 rpm
- Compression ratio: 10.5:1

== See also ==
Related lists

- List of aircraft engines
