= Electravia GMPE 104 =

French electericaircraft engine

GMPE 104
- Type: Electric aircraft engine
- National origin: France
- Manufacturer: Electravia

The Electravia GMPE 104 is a French electric motor for powering electric aircraft, designed and produced by Electravia of Vaumeilh.

By April 2018 the engine was no longer advertised on the company website and seems to be out of production.

== Design and development ==
The GMPE 104 is a brushed design producing 26 kW (35 hp), with a disk collector. It has a 93% efficiency.

== Specifications (GMPE 104) ==
Data from Tacke

=== General characteristics ===
- Type: brushed electric aircraft engine
- Length: 182 mm (7.2 in)
- Diameter: 206 mm (8.1 in)
- Dry weight: 13.8 kg (30.4 lb)

=== Components ===
- Coil type: Disk collector
- Reduction gear: none

=== Performance ===
- Power output: 26 kW (35 hp)
- Best efficiency: 93%
- Power-to-weight ratio: 1.8 kW/kg

== See also ==
- Electravia GMPE 102
- Electravia GMPE 205

Related lists

- List of aircraft engines
