= DTA Magic =

French ultralight trike

Magic
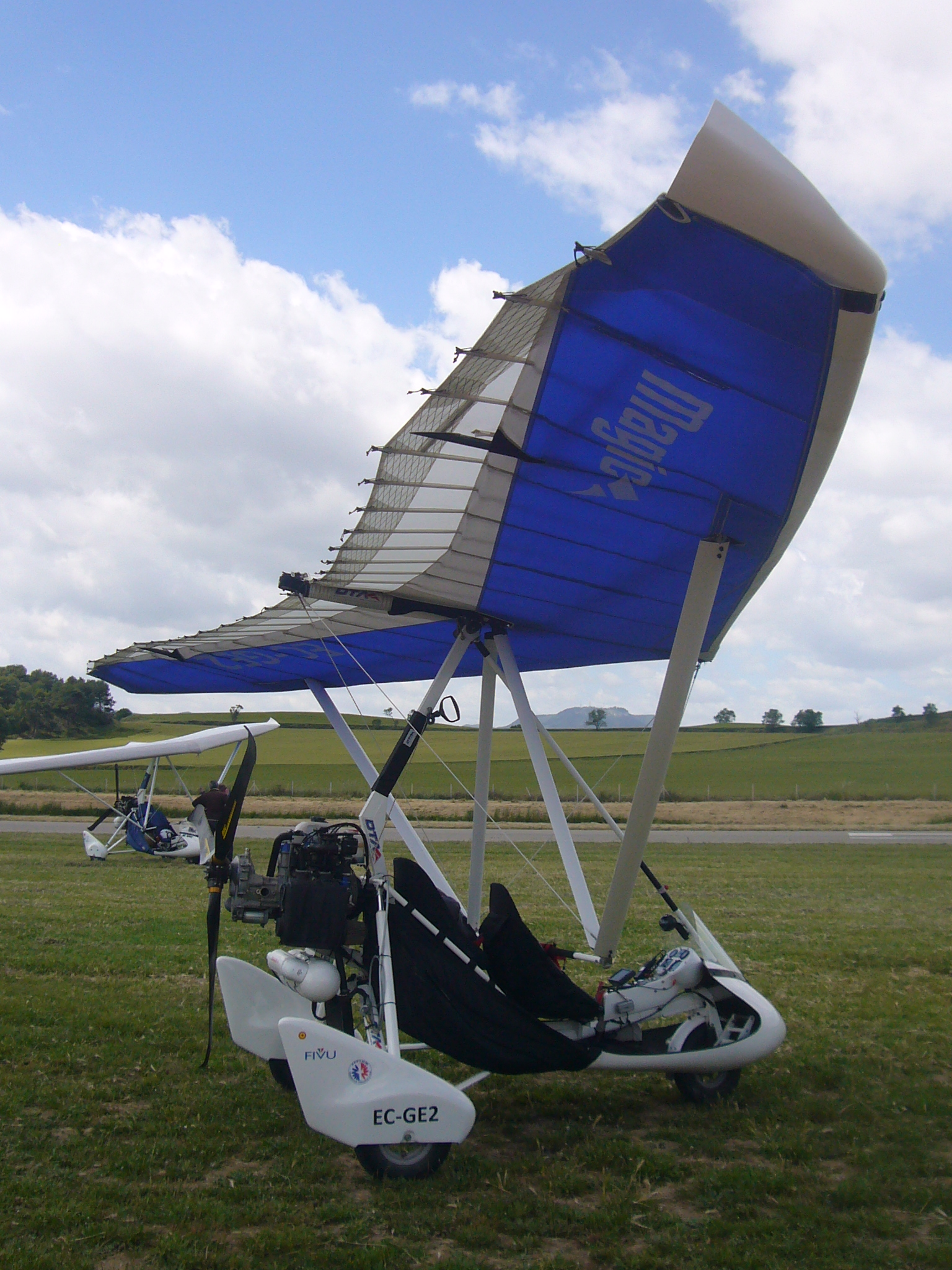
- Magic wing mounted on a DTA Feeling

General information
- Type: Ultralight trike wing
- National origin: France
- Manufacturer: DTA sarl
- Status: In production (2013)

History
- Manufactured: 2010-present
- Introduction date: 2010

The DTA Magic is a French double-surface ultralight trike wing, designed and produced by DTA sarl of Montélimar and introduced in 2010. The trike wing was the first "topless" design to be offered by a French manufacturer.

== Design and development ==
The Magic is a strut-braced "topless" hang glider-style wing designed as a touring wing for two-place trikes. It comes in one size with a wing area of 12.0 m^{2} (129 sq ft). The wing is comparatively small in area, which gives a higher cruise speed. Its low drag design means that trikes equipped with this wing require less installed power.

The wing is made from bolted-together aluminum tubing, with its 84% double surface wing covered in Dacron sailcloth. Its 9.4 m (30.8 ft) span wing has a nose angle of 130°, an aspect ratio of 6.4:1 and uses an "A" frame weight-shift control bar. The wing tips feature small winglets. It is manufactured by DTA's subcontractor, La société Ellipse.

== Applications ==
- DTA Combo
- DTA Evolution
- DTA Feeling
- DTA Voyageur

== Specifications (Magic 12) ==
Data from Bayerl and DTA

General characteristics

- Length: 2.68 m (8 ft 10 in)
- Wingspan: 9.40 m (30 ft 10 in)
- Height: 1.80 m (5 ft 11 in)
- Wing area: 12.0 m^{2} (129 sq ft)
- Aspect ratio: 6.4:1
- Empty weight: 59 kg (130 lb) wing weight
- Gross weight: 450 kg (992 lb) maximum aircraft gross weight allowed

Performance

- Stall speed: 53 km/h (33 mph, 29 kn)
- Never exceed speed: 180 km/h (110 mph, 97 kn)
- g limits: +4/-2
- Wing loading: 37.5 kg/m^{2} (7.7 lb/sq ft) maximum
