= DTA Dynamic =

French ultralight trike wing series

Dynamic
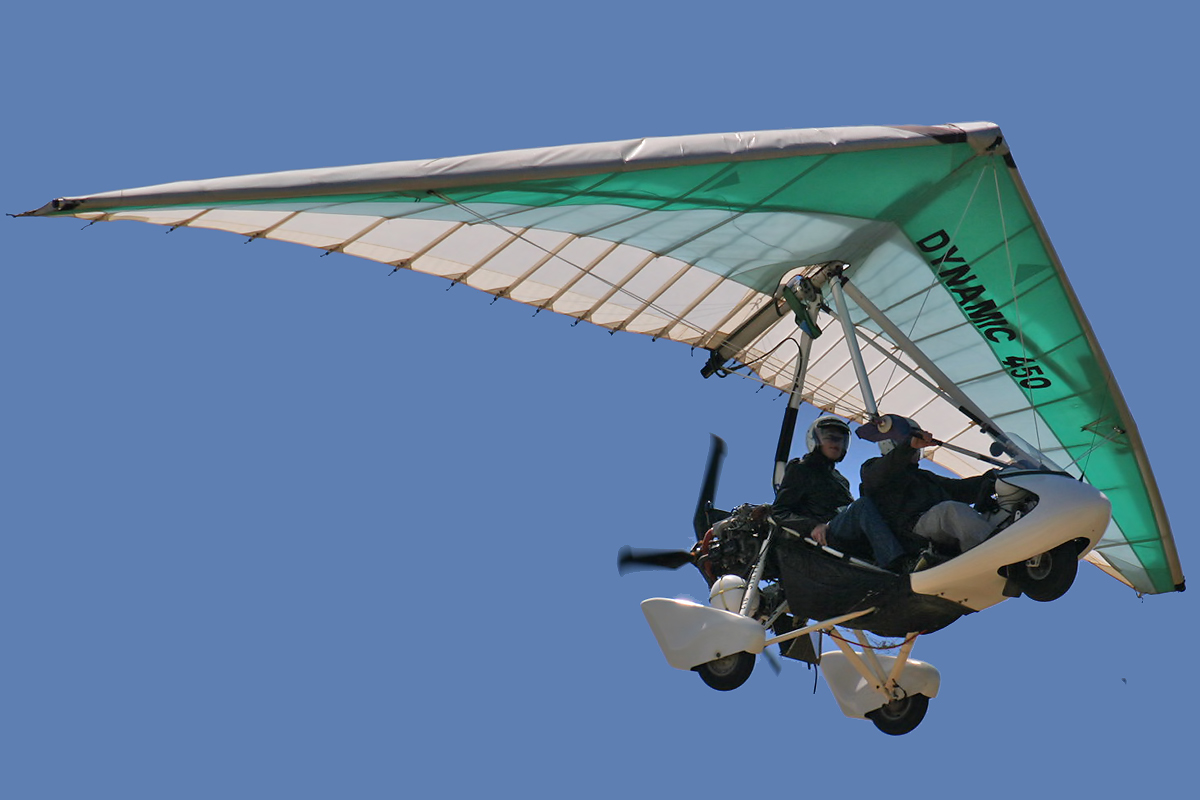

General information
- Type: Ultralight trike wing
- National origin: France
- Manufacturer: DTA sarl
- Status: In production (2013)

The DTA Dynamic is a series of French double-surface ultralight trike wings, designed and produced by DTA sarl of Montélimar. The wings are widely used on DTA trikes as well as by other ultralight aircraft manufacturers.

== Design and development ==
The Dynamic is a cable-braced, king post-equipped hang glider-style wing designed as a touring wing for two-place trikes. It comes in three sizes.

All members of the series are made from bolted-together aluminum tubing, with its 84% double surface wing covered in Dacron sailcloth. The wing's crosstube is of a floating design and all models have a nose angle of 125° and use an "A" frame weight-shift control bar. It is manufactured by DTA's subcontractor, La société Ellipse.

== Variants ==
Dynamic 450
Model with a gross weight of 472.5 kg (1,042 lb), a wing area of 15.5 m^{2} (167 sq ft), span of 10.2 m (33.5 ft), an aspect ratio of 5.4:1 and 80% double surface.
Dynamic 15
Model with a gross weight of 400 kg (880 lb), a wing area of 13.6 m^{2} (146 sq ft), span of 9.8 m (32.2 ft).
Dynamic 15/430
Model with a gross weight of 430 kg (950 lb), a wing area of 13.6 m^{2} (146 sq ft), span of 9.8 m (32.2 ft), an aspect ratio of 5.44:1 and 80% double surface.
Dynamic 16/430
Model with a gross weight of 430 kg (950 lb), a wing area of 14.5 m^{2} (156 sq ft), span of 10.2 m (33.5 ft), an aspect ratio of 6.0:1 and 75% double surface.

== Applications ==
- DTA Combo
- DTA Evolution
- DTA Feeling
- DTA Voyageur

== Specifications (Dynamic 450) ==
Data from Bayerl and DTA

General characteristics

- Length: 3.00 m (9 ft 10 in)
- Wingspan: 10.20 m (33 ft 6 in)
- Height: 2.70 m (8 ft 10 in)
- Wing area: 15.5 m^{2} (167 sq ft)
- Aspect ratio: 5.4:1
- Empty weight: 59 kg (130 lb) wing weight
- Gross weight: 450 kg (992 lb) maximum aircraft gross weight allowed

Performance

- Cruise speed: 110 km/h (68 mph, 59 kn)
- Stall speed: 50 km/h (31 mph, 27 kn)
- Never exceed speed: 160 km/h (99 mph, 86 kn)
- g limits: +4/-2
- Wing loading: 29.0 kg/m^{2} (5.9 lb/sq ft) maximum
