= DTA Combo =

French ultralight trike

Combo
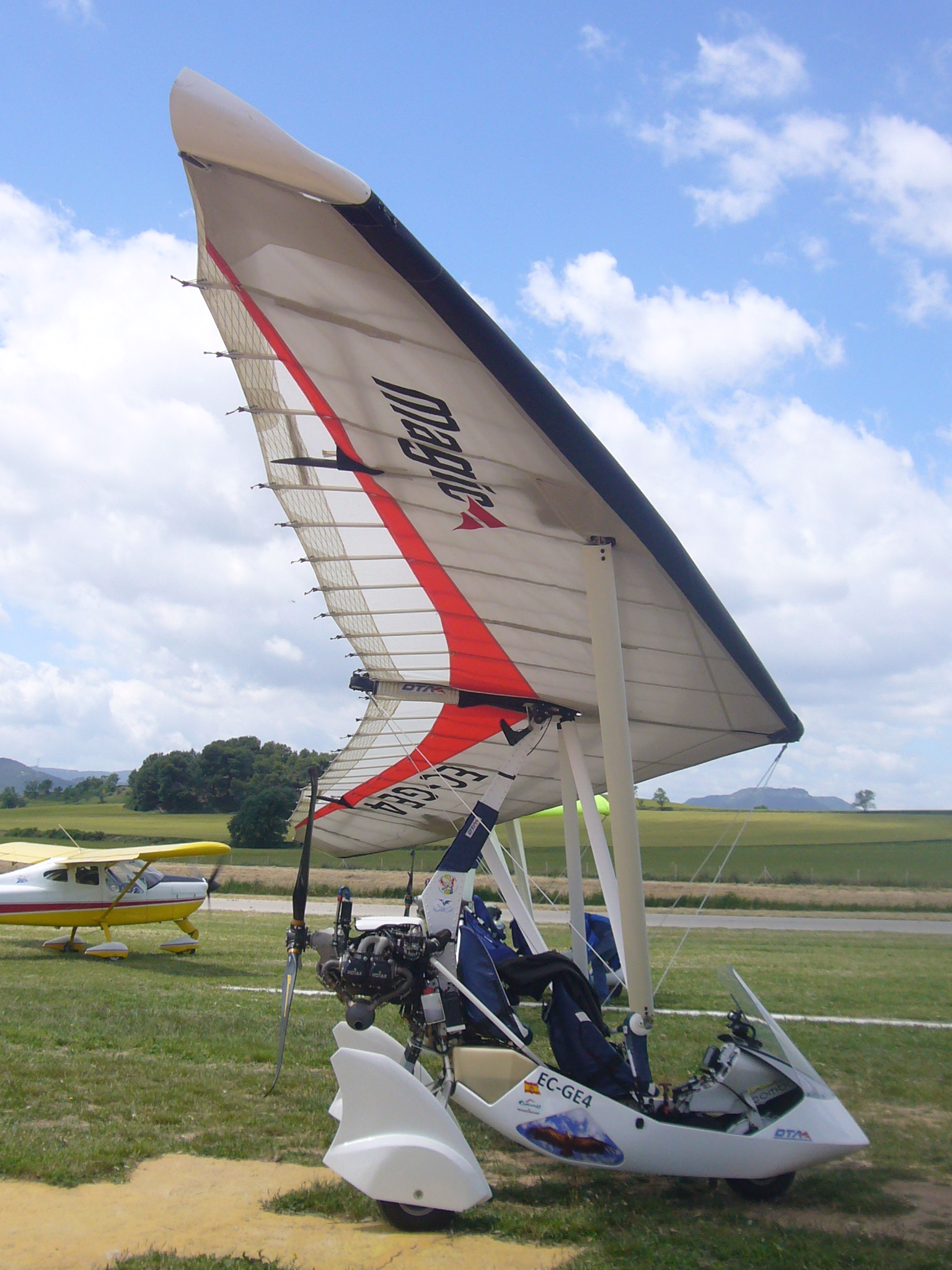
- A DTA Combo with the DTA Magic wing, at the Aerosport air show in 2013

General information
- Type: Ultralight trike
- National origin: France
- Manufacturer: DTA sarl
- Designer: Dominique Corriera
- Status: In production (2013)

The DTA Combo is a French ultralight trike, designed by Dominique Corriera and produced by DTA sarl of Montélimar. The aircraft is supplied complete and ready-to-fly.

== Design and development ==
The Combo was designed to comply with the Fédération Aéronautique Internationale microlight category. It features a cable-braced or strut-braced hang glider-style high-wing, weight-shift controls, a two-seats-in-tandem open cockpit with a full cockpit fairing and windshield, tricycle landing gear with wheel pants and a single engine in pusher configuration.

The aircraft is made from welded 4130 steel tubing, with Zicral alloy suspension. Its double surface wing is covered in Dacron sailcloth. A number of different wings and engines can be fitted to create several variants.

== Variants ==
Combo FC 912 S Diva
Version with the 9.4 m (30.8 ft) span DTA Diva wing of 12 m^{2} (130 sq ft). This wing is supported by a single tube-type kingpost and uses an "A" frame weight-shift control bar. The powerplant is a four cylinder, air and liquid-cooled, four-stroke, dual-ignition 100 hp (75 kW) Rotax 912S engine. This version has an empty weight of 241 kg (531 lb) and a gross weight of 450 kg (992 lb), giving a useful load of 209 kg (461 lb). With full fuel of 70 litres (15 imp gal; 18 US gal) the payload is 158 kg (348 lb).
Combo FC 912 S Magic
Version with the 9.4 m (30.8 ft) span DTA Magic wing of 12 m^{2} (130 sq ft). This wing is a "topless" design, supported by struts and uses an "A" frame weight-shift control bar. The wing features vortex generators on the leading edge and gives a glide ratio if 10:1. The powerplant is a four cylinder, air and liquid-cooled, four-stroke, dual-ignition 100 hp (75 kW) Rotax 912S engine. This version has an empty weight of 243 kg (536 lb) and a gross weight of 472.5 kg (1,042 lb), giving a useful load of 229.5 kg (506 lb). With full fuel of 70 litres (15 imp gal; 18 US gal) the payload is 179 kg (395 lb).
Combo HKS Dynamic 15/430
Version with the 9.4 m (30.8 ft) span DTA Dynamic wing of 13.60 m^{2} (146.4 sq ft). This wing is supported by a single tube-type kingpost and uses an "A" frame weight-shift control bar. The powerplant is a twin cylinder, air-cooled, four-stroke, dual-ignition 60 hp (45 kW) HKS 700E engine. This version has an empty weight of 196 kg (432 lb) and a gross weight of 430 kg (948 lb), giving a useful load of 234 kg (516 lb). With full fuel of 70 litres (15 imp gal; 18 US gal) the payload is 184 kg (406 lb). A distinctive feature of the Combo HKS Dynamic 15/430 is its all-black tubing.

== Specifications (Combo FC 912 S Magic) ==
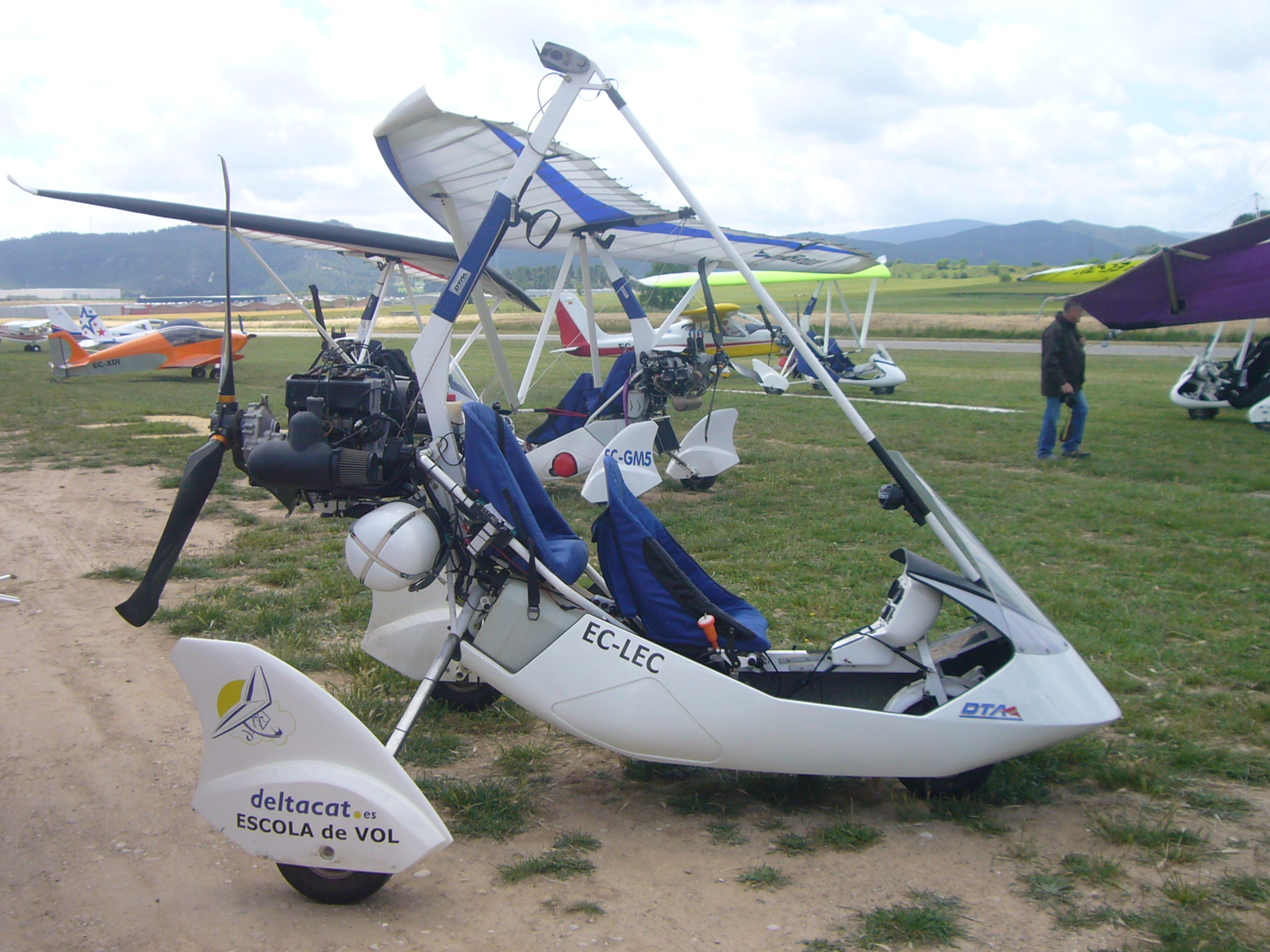
DTA Combo carriage

Data from Bayerl

General characteristics

- Crew: one
- Capacity: one passenger
- Wingspan: 9.4 m (30 ft 10 in)
- Wing area: 12.0 m^{2} (129 sq ft)
- Empty weight: 243 kg (536 lb)
- Gross weight: 472.5 kg (1,042 lb)
- Fuel capacity: 70 litres (15 imp gal; 18 US gal)
- Powerplant: 1 × Rotax 912ULS four cylinder, liquid and air-cooled, four stroke aircraft engine, 75 kW (101 hp)
- Propellers: 3-bladed composite

Performance

- Maximum speed: 160 km/h (99 mph, 86 kn)
- Cruise speed: 130 km/h (81 mph, 70 kn)
- Stall speed: 58 km/h (36 mph, 31 kn)
- Maximum glide ratio: 10:1
- Rate of climb: 5.5 m/s (1,080 ft/min)
- Wing loading: 39.4 kg/m^{2} (8.1 lb/sq ft)
