= DTA J-RO =

French autogyro

J-RO
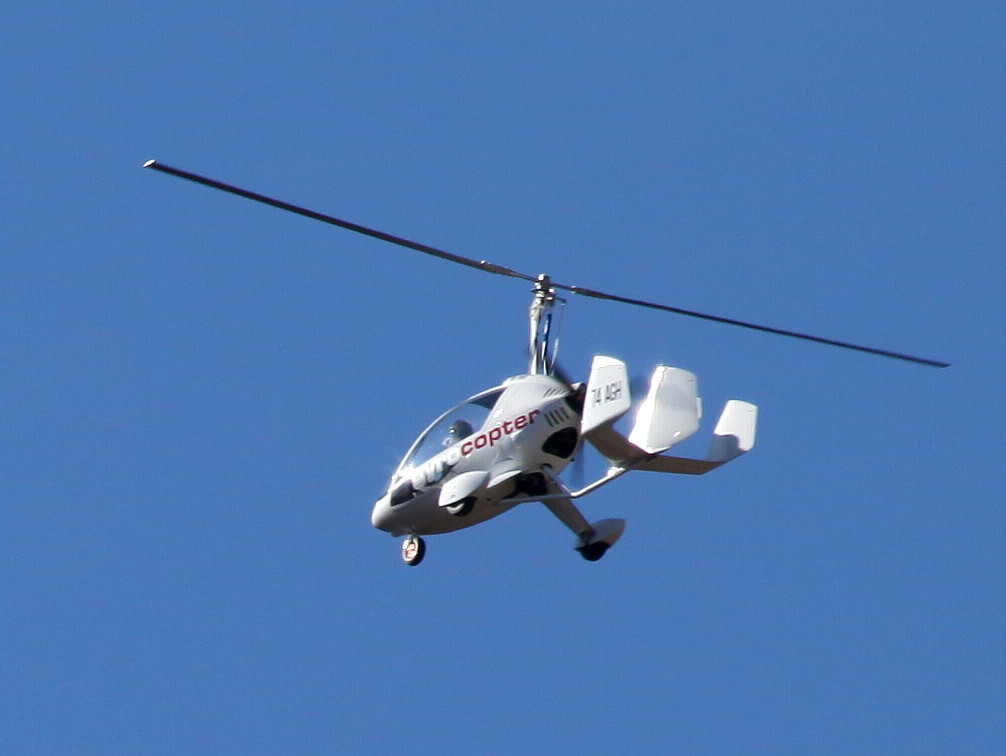

General information
- Type: Autogyro
- National origin: France
- Manufacturer: DTA sarl
- Status: In production (2017)

The DTA J-RO (transl. gyro) is a French autogyro designed and produced by DTA sarl of Montélimar. The aircraft is supplied complete and ready-to-fly.

== Design and development ==
The J-RO was designed to combine the advantages of an ultralight trike with an autogyro. As such it is a "Cabriolet" (convertible) design whereby the gull-winged doors are removable to allow open air flight in the summertime and an enclosed cockpit for cooler weather. The doors are a factory option and may be purchased and installed later.

The design features a single main rotor, a two-seats-in tandem configuration enclosed or open cockpit with a windshield, tricycle landing gear with wheel pants and a four-cylinder, liquid and air-cooled, four stroke 100 hp (75 kW) Rotax 912ULS or turbocharged 115 hp (86 kW) Rotax 914 engine in pusher configuration. It has a Kevlar belt-driven pre-rotator for the main rotor.

The aircraft fuselage is made from carbon fiber reinforced polymer. Its two-bladed rotor has a diameter of 8.60 m (28.2 ft) and a chord of 21.3 cm (8.4 in). The aircraft has a typical empty weight of 282 kg (622 lb) and a gross weight of 560 kg (1,235 lb), giving a useful load of 278 kg (613 lb). With full fuel of 68 litres (15 imp gal; 18 US gal) the payload for the pilot, passenger and baggage is 229 kg (505 lb).

In noise testing for acceptance in Switzerland the design produced 62.4 dB. The Swiss testing requires the design produce no more than a maximum of 65 dB for this class of aircraft.

== Specifications (J-RO) ==
Data from Tacke

General characteristics

- Crew: one
- Capacity: one passenger
- Empty weight: 282 kg (622 lb)
- Gross weight: 560 kg (1,235 lb)
- Fuel capacity: 68 litres (15 imp gal; 18 US gal)
- Powerplant: 1 × Rotax 914 four cylinder, liquid and air-cooled, four stroke turbocharged aircraft engine, 86 kW (115 hp)
- Main rotor diameter: 8.60 m (28 ft 3 in)
- Main rotor area: 58 m^{2} (620 sq ft)
- Propellers: 3-bladed composite

Performance

- Maximum speed: 180 km/h (110 mph, 97 kn)
- Cruise speed: 160 km/h (99 mph, 86 kn)
- Disk loading: 9.65 kg/m^{2} (1.98 lb/sq ft)

== See also ==
- List of rotorcraft
