= Electravia GMPE 102 =

French electric aircraft engine

GMPE 102
- Type: Electric aircraft engine
- National origin: France
- Manufacturer: Electravia

The Electravia GMPE 102 is a French electric motor for powering electric aircraft, designed and produced by Electravia of Vaumeilh.

By April 2018 the engine was no longer advertised on the company website and seems to be out of production.

== Design and development ==
The GMPE 102 is a brushed 74 volt design producing 19 kW (25 hp), with a disk collector. It has a 93% efficiency. The low working rpm of the engine means that it can turn a propeller at efficient speeds without the need for a reduction drive.

== Specifications (GMPE 102) ==
Data from Tacke

=== General characteristics ===
- Type: brushed electric aircraft engine
- Length: 182 mm (7.2 in)
- Diameter: 206 mm (8.1 in)
- Dry weight: 13.3 kg (29.3 lb)

=== Components ===
- Coil type: Disk collector
- Reduction gear: none

=== Performance ===
- Power output: 19 kW (25 hp)
- Voltage: 74V nominal
- Best efficiency: 93%
- Power-to-weight ratio: 1.4 kW/kg

== See also ==
- Electravia GMPE 104
- Electravia GMPE 205

Related lists

- List of aircraft engines
