= Santa Maria Assunta, Serramazoni =

Roman Catholic Church in Serramazoni, Italy

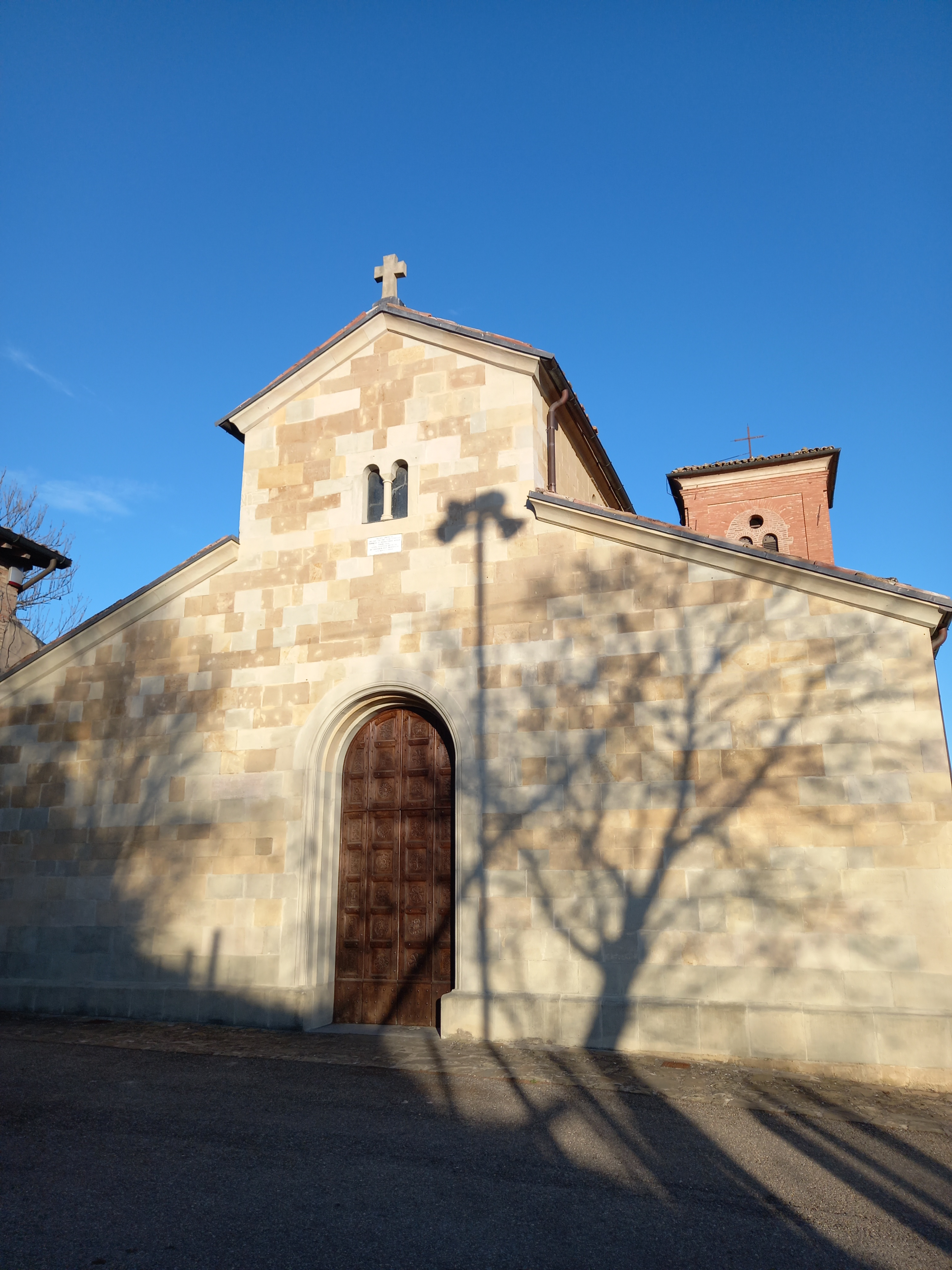

Santa Maria Assunta is Romanesque-stye, Roman Catholic parish church located just outside the frazione of Rocca Santa Maria of the town of Serramazzoni in the province of Modena, region of Emilia-Romagna, Italy.

== History ==
A church at the site is recalled from the 9th century, but the building dates from the later reconstructions. Documents link the church in 1038 to the Marchese Bonifacio of Tuscany, and subsequently to his daughter Matilde di Canossa, who ceded it in 1108 to the bishop of Modena.

Refurbishment in 1913-1930 attempted to restore the three nave church to its original Romanesque appearance. The ground-floor has few windows. In the rear is a two story bell-tower. The facade was remade in stone, and the roof in wood. The sculpted internal column capitals date to the 11th century. In 1974, the church was made a Marian sanctuary.
