= DTA Alizés =

French ultralight trike

Alizés

General information
- Type: Ultralight trike
- National origin: France
- Manufacturer: DTA sarl
- Designer: Michel Guaiguant
- Status: In production (2013)

History
- Variant: Electravia Electro Trike

The DTA Alizés (English: Tradewind) is a French ultralight trike that was designed by Michel Guaiguant and is produced by DTA sarl of Montélimar.

The aircraft is a joint venture with wing manufacturer La société Ellipse who market it as the Ellipse Alizé. It is supplied as a complete ready-to-fly-aircraft.

== Design and development ==
The Alizés was designed to comply with the Fédération Aéronautique Internationale microlight category, including the category's maximum gross weight of 450 kg (992 lb). The aircraft also fits the US FAR 103 Ultralight Vehicles rules.

The Alizés features a cable-braced Ellipse Fuji hang glider-style high-wing, weight-shift controls, a single-seat open cockpit with no cockpit fairing, tricycle landing gear without wheel pants and a single engine in pusher configuration.

The Alizés is a very simple nanotrike and is made from bolted-together aluminum tubing, with its single surface wing covered in Dacron sailcloth. Its 10 m (32.8 ft) span wing is supported by a single tube-type kingpost and uses an "A" frame weight-shift control bar. The powerplant is a single cylinder, air-cooled, two-stroke, 22 hp (16 kW) Zenoah G25 engine. The aircraft has an empty weight of 72 kg (159 lb) and a gross weight of 170 kg (375 lb), giving a useful load of 98 kg (216 lb). With full fuel of 10 litres (2.2 imp gal; 2.6 US gal) the payload is 91 kg (201 lb).

Due to its single seat configuration and "niche appeal", the aircraft has not sold in large numbers.

== Variants ==
Ellipse Alizé
Model sold in the early 2010s by wing manufacturer La société Ellipse, with either the Fuji or Ellipse Titan CX strut-braced wing and powered by a Cors-Air 24 hp (18 kW) engine.
Ellipse Fuji 16 Alizé
Model sold in the mid-2010s by wing manufacturer La société Ellipse, with the Fuji 16 cable-braced wing and powered by a Cors-Air 24 hp (18 kW) engine. Reviewer Dimitri Delemarle described it as "a versatile wing, easy for a new pilot to handle yet rewarding to fly".
Ellipse Titan CX Alizé
Model sold in the mid-2010s by wing manufacturer La société Ellipse, with the Ellipse Titan CX strut-braced wing and powered by a Cors-Air 24 hp (18 kW) engine, or starting in 2014, a Swissauto motor.

== Specifications (Alizés) ==
Data from Bertrand

General characteristics

- Crew: one
- Wingspan: 10 m (32 ft 10 in)
- Wing area: 16 m^{2} (170 sq ft)
- Empty weight: 72 kg (159 lb)
- Gross weight: 170 kg (375 lb)
- Fuel capacity: 10 litres (2.2 imp gal; 2.6 US gal)
- Powerplant: 1 × Zenoah G25 single cylinder, air-cooled, two stroke aircraft engine, 16 kW (22 hp)
- Propellers: 2-bladed wooden

Performance

- Maximum speed: 72 km/h (45 mph, 39 kn)
- Cruise speed: 55 km/h (34 mph, 30 kn)
- Stall speed: 38 km/h (24 mph, 21 kn)
- Rate of climb: 3.0 m/s (590 ft/min)
- Wing loading: 10.6 kg/m^{2} (2.2 lb/sq ft)
