= DTA Diva =

Wing for ultralight aircraft

Diva

General information
- Type: Ultralight trike wing
- National origin: France
- Manufacturer: DTA sarl
- Status: In production (2013)

History
- Manufactured: 2009-present
- Introduction date: 2009

The DTA Diva is a French double-surface ultralight trike wing, designed and produced by DTA sarl of Montélimar and introduced in 2009. The wing is widely used on DTA trikes as well as by other ultralight aircraft manufacturers.

== Design and development ==
The Diva is a cable-braced, king post-equipped hang glider-style wing designed as a touring wing for two-place trikes. It comes in one size with a wing area of 12.0 m^{2} (129 sq ft). The wing is comparatively small in area, which gives a higher cruise speed at the cost of a higher stall speed.

The wing is made from bolted-together aluminum tubing, with its 84% double surface wing covered in Dacron sailcloth. The wing's crosstube is of a floating design. Its 9.4 m (30.8 ft) span wing has a nose angle of 130°, an aspect ratio of 5.2:1 and uses an "A" frame weight-shift control bar. The wing tips feature small winglets. It is manufactured by DTA's subcontractor, La société Ellipse.

== Applications ==
- DTA Combo
- DTA Evolution
- DTA Feeling
- DTA Voyageur

== Specifications (Diva 12) ==
Data from Bayerl and DTA

General characteristics

- Length: 2.96 m (9 ft 9 in)
- Wingspan: 9.40 m (30 ft 10 in)
- Height: 2.90 m (9 ft 6 in)
- Wing area: 12.0 m^{2} (129 sq ft)
- Aspect ratio: 5.2:1
- Empty weight: 54 kg (119 lb) wing weight
- Gross weight: 450 kg (992 lb) maximum aircraft gross weight allowed

Performance

- Cruise speed: 120 km/h (75 mph, 65 kn)
- Stall speed: 61 km/h (38 mph, 33 kn)
- Never exceed speed: 160 km/h (99 mph, 86 kn)
- g limits: +4/-2
- Wing loading: 37.5 kg/m^{2} (7.7 lb/sq ft) maximum
