= DTA sarl =

French aircraft manufacturer

DTA
- Company type: Privately held company
- Industry: Aerospace
- Headquarters: Montélimar, France
- Key people: Jean-Michel Dizier
- Products: Ultralight trikes, autogyros
- Website: www.dta-aircraft.com

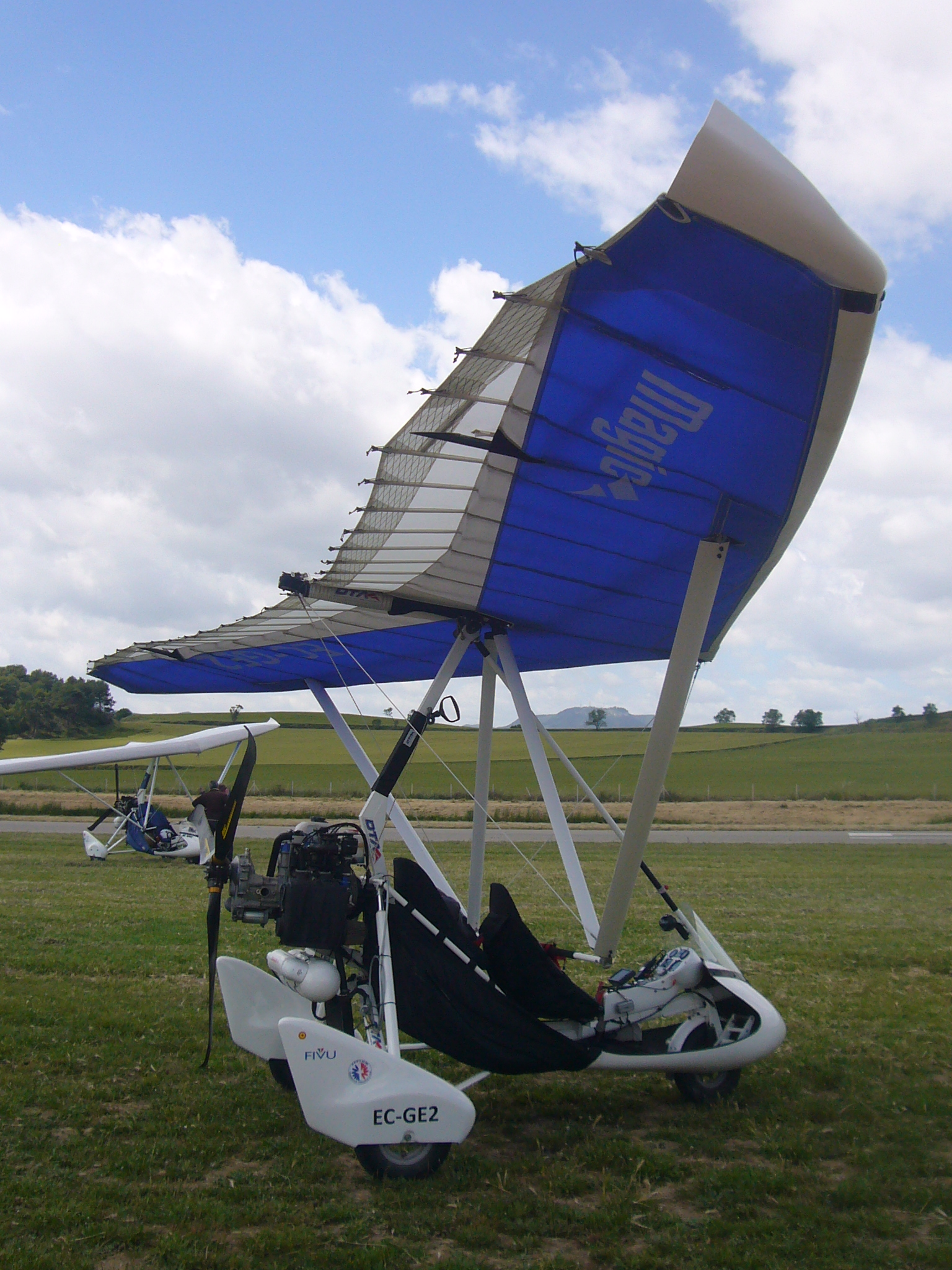
DTA Feeling trike with the DTA Magic strut-braced wing

DTA sarl (Delta Trikes Aviation) is a French aircraft manufacturer based in Montélimar. The company specializes in the design and manufacture of ultralight trikes.

The company also specializes in the design of ultralight trike wings which are manufactured under subcontract by Ellipse.

DTA also designed and builds the J-RO autogyro, which aims to provide a similar experience to trike flying, but with rotary wings.

== Aircraft ==
Summary of aircraft built by DTA
Model name	First flight	Number built	Type
DTA Combo			Ultralight trike
DTA Voyageur			Ultralight trike
DTA Feeling			Ultralight trike
DTA Evolution			Ultralight trike
DTA Alizés			Ultralight trike
DTA Diva	2009		Ultralight trike wing
DTA Dynamic			Ultralight trike wing
DTA Magic	2010		Ultralight trike wing
DTA J-RO			Gyroplane
DTA Xeeleex			Gyroplane

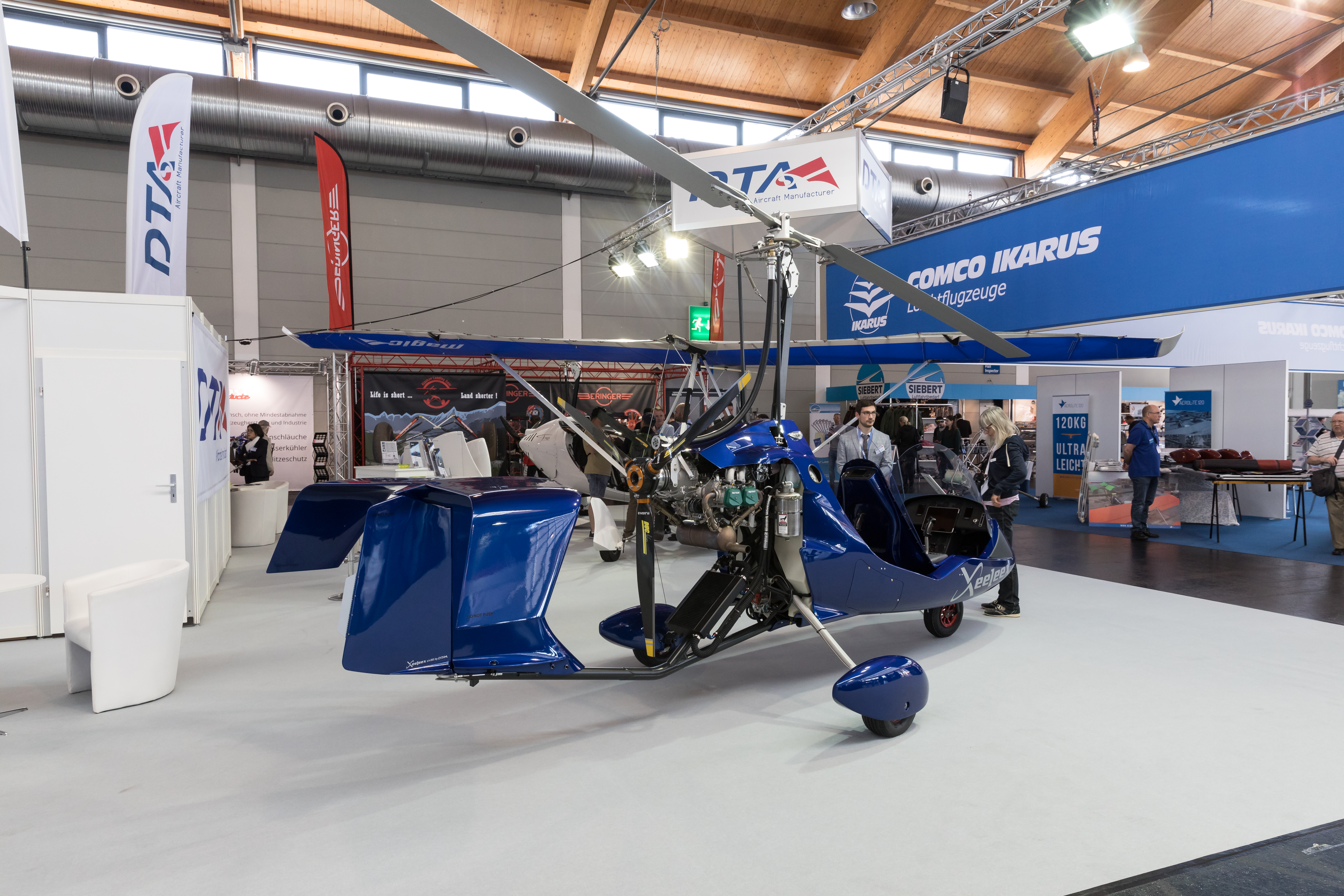
Xeeleex
