= Electravia Monotrace-E =

French ultralight trike

Monotrace-E

General information
- Type: Electric ultralight trike
- National origin: France
- Manufacturer: Electravia
- Status: Production completed

History
- Developed from: AEF Monotrace

The Electravia Monotrace-E is a French electric ultralight trike that was produced by Electravia of Vaumeilh and based on the AEF Monotrace. Now out of production, when it was available it was supplied complete and ready-to-fly.

== Design and development ==
The Monotrace-E was designed as a soaring motor glider, to comply with the Fédération Aéronautique Internationale microlight category and the US FAR 103 Ultralight Vehicles rules.

The aircraft design features a cable-braced hang glider-style high-wing, weight-shift controls, a single-seat open cockpit with a cockpit fairing, tricycle landing gear and a single electric motor in pusher configuration.

The aircraft is made from bolted-together aluminum tubing and composite materials, with its double surface wing covered in Dacron sailcloth. Its 10 m (32.8 ft) span wing is supported by a single tube-type kingpost and uses an "A" frame weight-shift control bar. The powerplant is a 26 hp (19 kW) E-Motor GMPE 102 electric motor, powered by a Kokam battery pack and driving an E-Props propeller, giving about 25 minutes endurance.

The aircraft has an empty weight of 85 kg (187 lb) and a gross weight of 193 kg (425 lb), giving a payload of 108 kg (238 lb).

== Specifications (Monotrace-E) ==
Data from Tacke

General characteristics

- Crew: one
- Wingspan: 10 m (32 ft 10 in)
- Wing area: 16 m^{2} (170 sq ft)
- Empty weight: 85 kg (187 lb)
- Gross weight: 193 kg (425 lb)
- Powerplant: 1 × E-Motor GMPE 102 electric motor and a Kokam battery pack, 19 kW (26 hp)
- Propellers: 2-bladed E-Props carbon fibre

Performance

- Maximum speed: 75 km/h (47 mph, 40 kn)
- Cruise speed: 65 km/h (40 mph, 35 kn)
- Stall speed: 45 km/h (28 mph, 24 kn)
- Wing loading: 12.1 kg/m^{2} (2.5 lb/sq ft)
