= DTA Voyageur =

French ultralight trike

Voyageur
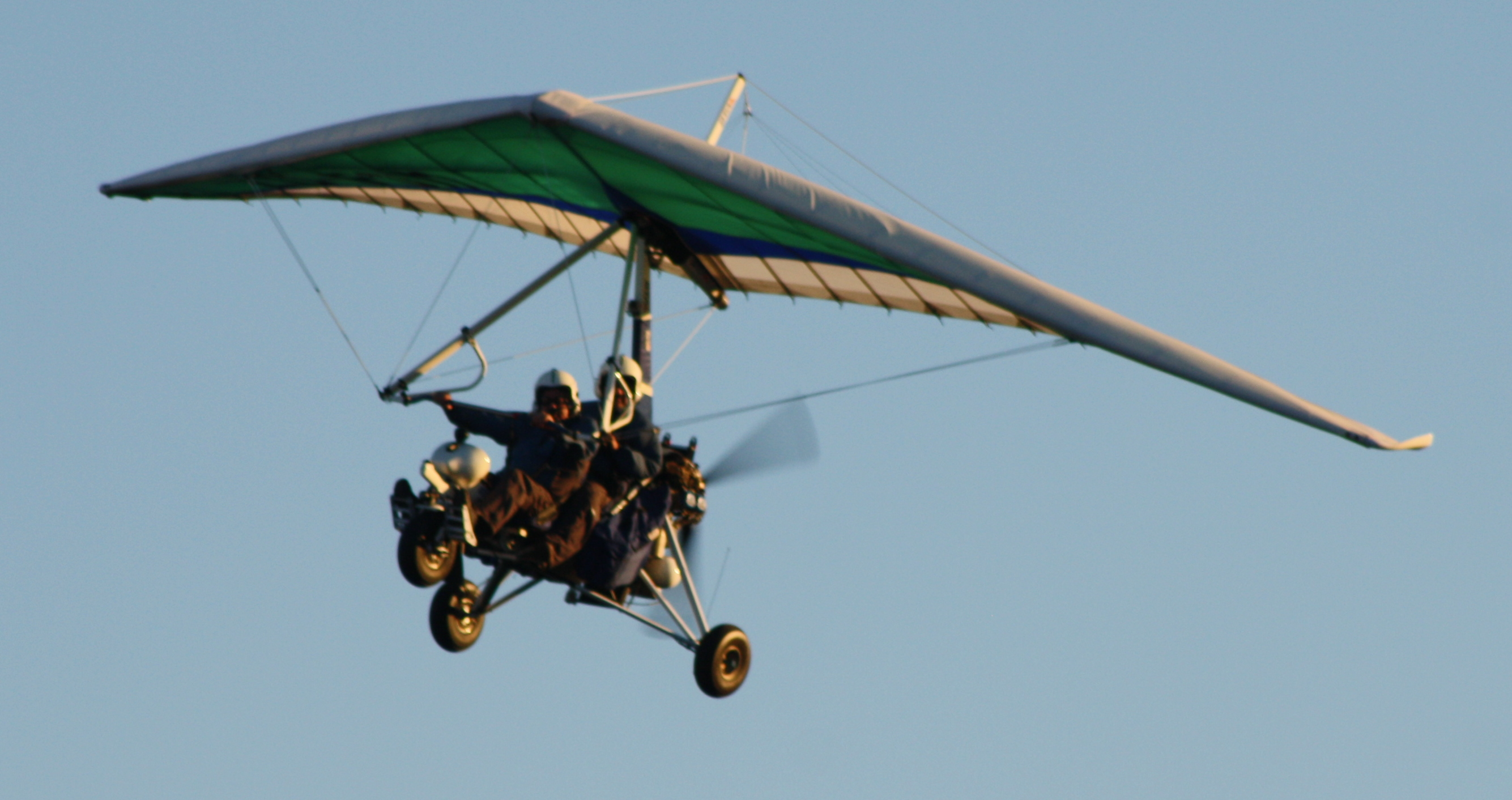
- DTA Voyageur II 912

General information
- Type: Ultralight trike
- National origin: France
- Manufacturer: DTA sarl
- Designer: Jean-Michel Dizier
- Status: In production (2013)

The DTA Voyageur is a French ultralight trike, designed by Jean-Michel Dizier and produced by DTA sarl of Montélimar. The aircraft is supplied complete and ready-to-fly.

== Design and development ==
The aircraft was initially designed as an agricultural aircraft to comply with the Fédération Aéronautique Internationale microlight category, including the category's maximum gross weight of 450 kg (992 lb). The Voyageur is intended as a bush aircraft for flying from unprepared surfaces and as such mounts heavy duty landing gear, tundra tires and lacks a cockpit fairing and a front wing strut.

The Voyageur has a maximum gross weight of 450 kg (992 lb), depending on the wing fitted. It features a cable-braced hang glider-style high-wing, weight-shift controls, a two-seats-in-tandem open cockpit, tricycle landing gear without wheel pants and a single engine in pusher configuration.

The aircraft is made from bolted-together aluminum tubing, with its double surface wing covered in Dacron sailcloth. When fitted with a DTA Dynamic 450 wing it has a span of 10.20 m (33.5 ft), supported by a single tube-type kingpost and uses an "A" frame weight-shift control bar. The powerplant is a twin cylinder, liquid-cooled, two-stroke, dual-ignition 64 hp (48 kW) Rotax 582 engine or the four cylinder, air and liquid-cooled, four-stroke, dual-ignition 100 hp (75 kW) Rotax 912S engine.

A number of different wings can be fitted to the basic carriage, including the DTA Dynamic 450, the DTA Dynamic 15/430 DTA Magic and DTA Diva.

The Voyageur II model is accepted as a light-sport aircraft in the United States.

== Variants ==
Voyageur 582 Dynamic 15
Model with a 64 hp (48 kW) Rotax 582 engine and DTA Dynamic 15 wing. The aircraft has an empty weight of 177 kg (390 lb) and a gross weight of 400 kg (882 lb), giving a useful load of 223 kg (492 lb). With full fuel of 70 litres (15 imp gal; 18 US gal) the payload is 173 kg (381 lb).
Voyageur 912 S Dynamic 450
Model with a 100 hp (75 kW) Rotax 912S engine and DTA Dynamic 450 wing. The aircraft has an empty weight of 209 kg (461 lb) and a gross weight of 450 kg (992 lb), giving a useful load of 241 kg (531 lb). With full fuel of 75 litres (16 imp gal; 20 US gal) the payload is 191 kg (421 lb).
Voyageur II 582 Dynamic 15/430
Improved model with a 64 hp (48 kW) Rotax 582 engine and DTA Dynamic 15/430 wing. The aircraft has an empty weight of 196 kg (432 lb) and a gross weight of 430 kg (948 lb), giving a useful load of 234 kg (516 lb). With full fuel of 75 litres (16 imp gal; 20 US gal) the payload is 180 kg (397 lb).
Voyageur II 912 S Dynamic 450
Improved model with a 100 hp (75 kW) Rotax 912S engine and DTA Dynamic 450 wing. The aircraft has an empty weight of 226 kg (498 lb) and a gross weight of 450 kg (992 lb), giving a useful load of 224 kg (494 lb). With full fuel of 75 litres (16 imp gal; 20 US gal) the payload is 170 kg (375 lb).

== Specifications (Voyageur II 912 S Dynamic 450) ==
Data from Bayerl

General characteristics

- Crew: one
- Capacity: one passenger
- Wingspan: 10.20 m (33 ft 6 in)
- Wing area: 15.50 m^{2} (166.8 sq ft)
- Empty weight: 226 kg (498 lb)
- Gross weight: 450 kg (992 lb)
- Fuel capacity: 75 litres (16 imp gal; 20 US gal)
- Powerplant: 1 × Rotax 912ULS four cylinder, liquid and air-cooled, four stroke aircraft engine, 75 kW (101 hp)
- Propellers: 3-bladed composite

Performance

- Maximum speed: 136 km/h (85 mph, 73 kn)
- Cruise speed: 100 km/h (62 mph, 54 kn)
- Stall speed: 62 km/h (39 mph, 33 kn)
- Rate of climb: 6.0 m/s (1,180 ft/min)
- Wing loading: 29.0 kg/m^{2} (5.9 lb/sq ft)
