= Simonini Victor 2 Super =

Italian aircraft engine

Victor 2 Super
- Type: Aircraft engine
- National origin: Italy
- Manufacturer: Simonini Racing

The Simonini Victor 2 Super is an Italian aircraft engine, designed and produced by Simonini Racing of San Dalmazio di Serramazzoni for use in ultralight aircraft.

== Design and development ==
The Victor 2 Super is a twin in-line cylinder two-stroke, liquid-cooled, petrol engine design, with a mechanical gearbox reduction drive with reduction ratios of 2.54:1 to 4.00:1. It employs dual capacitor discharge ignition and produces 102 hp (76 kW) at 6200 rpm.

== Specifications (Victor 2 Super) ==
Data from World Directory of Leisure Aviation 2011-12 and Light Planes

=== General characteristics ===
- Type: Twin cylinder, two stroke aircraft engine
- Bore: 82 mm (3.2 in)
- Stroke: 76 mm (3.0 in)
- Displacement: 802 cc (48.9 cu in)
- Length: 648 mm (25.5 in)
- Width: 410 mm (16.1 in)
- Height: 490 mm (19.3 in)
- Dry weight: 52 kg (114.6 lb)

=== Components ===
- Fuel type: gasoline
- Cooling system: liquid
- Reduction gear: mechanical gearbox reduction drive, reduction ratios of 2.54:1 to 4.00:1

=== Performance ===
- Power output: 102 hp (76 kW) at 6200 rpm
- Compression ratio: 9.5:1

== See also ==
Related lists

- List of aircraft engines
