= DTA Evolution =

French ultralight trike

Evolution

General information
- Type: Ultralight trike
- National origin: France
- Manufacturer: DTA sarl
- Status: In production (2013)

The DTA Evolution is a French ultralight trike, designed and produced by DTA sarl of Montélimar. The aircraft is supplied as a complete ready-to-fly-aircraft.

== Design and development ==
The aircraft was designed as a simple trike, with an exceptional payload, to comply with the Fédération Aéronautique Internationale microlight category, including the category's maximum gross weight of 450 kg (992 lb). The aircraft has a maximum gross weight of 400 kg (882 lb). It features a cable-braced hang glider-style high-wing, weight-shift controls, a two-seats-in-tandem open cockpit without a cockpit fairing, tricycle landing gear with wheel pants and a single engine in pusher configuration.

The aircraft is made from bolted-together aluminum tubing, with its single surface wing covered in Dacron sailcloth. Its 10.30 m (33.8 ft) span DTA Dynamic 16 wing is supported by a single tube-type kingpost and uses an "A" frame weight-shift control bar. The powerplant is a twin cylinder, air-cooled, two-stroke, dual-ignition 50 hp (37 kW) Rotax 503 engine, with the liquid cooled 64 hp (48 kW) Rotax 582, the four cylinder, air and liquid-cooled, four-stroke, dual-ignition 80 hp (60 kW) Rotax 912 or 100 hp (75 kW) Rotax 912S engines optional.

With the Rotax 503 and the Dynamic 16 wing, the aircraft has an empty weight of 166 kg (366 lb) and a gross weight of 400 kg (882 lb), giving a useful load of 234 kg (516 lb). With full fuel of 50 litres (11 imp gal; 13 US gal) the payload is 198 kg (437 lb).

A number of different wings can be fitted to the basic carriage, including the DTA Dynamic, DTA Diva and the strut-braced DTA Magic.

== Operational history ==
In September 2003 a French flying team flew an Evolution from Paris to Dakar, making use of the aircraft's high payload to carry all needed supplies.

== Specifications (Evolution with Dynamic 16 wing) ==
Data from Bertrand

General characteristics

- Crew: one
- Capacity: one passenger
- Wingspan: 10.30 m (33 ft 10 in)
- Wing area: 14.50 m^{2} (156.1 sq ft)
- Empty weight: 166 kg (366 lb)
- Gross weight: 400 kg (882 lb)
- Fuel capacity: 50 litres (11 imp gal; 13 US gal)
- Powerplant: 1 × Rotax 503 or twin cylinder, air-cooled, two stroke aircraft engine, 37 kW (50 hp)
- Propellers: 3-bladed composite

Performance

- Maximum speed: 115 km/h (71 mph, 62 kn)
- Cruise speed: 90 km/h (56 mph, 49 kn)
- Stall speed: 50 km/h (31 mph, 27 kn)
- Rate of climb: 3.6 m/s (710 ft/min)
- Wing loading: 27.6 kg/m^{2} (5.7 lb/sq ft)
