= AEF Monotrace =

French ultralight trike

Monotrace

General information
- Type: Ultralight trike
- National origin: France
- Manufacturer: AEF Air Lift System
- Status: In production (2013)

The AEF Monotrace is a French ultralight trike, designed and produced by AEF Air Lift System of Houilles. The aircraft is supplied as a complete ready-to-fly-aircraft.

== Design and development ==
The Monotrace was conceived as a soaring trike with retractable main landing gear. It was designed to comply with the Fédération Aéronautique Internationale microlight category, including the category's maximum gross weight of 450 kg (992 lb). The aircraft has a maximum gross weight of 180 kg (397 lb). It also complies with the requirements of the US FAR 103 Ultralight Vehicles rules. It features a cable-braced hang glider-style high-wing, weight-shift controls, a single-seat open cockpit, quadracycle landing gear and a single engine in pusher configuration.

The aircraft is made from bolted-together aluminium tubing, with a composite partial cockpit fairing. A full fairing that can be adjusted in flight to provide wing trim is optional. The 50% double surface wing is covered in Dacron sailcloth, is supported by a single tube-type kingpost and uses an "A" frame weight-shift control bar. The powerplant is an air-cooled, two-stroke, 33 hp (25 kW) Simonini Mini 3 engine, with the Simonini Mini 2+ or the Electravia engines optional. The landing gear consists of four wheels: a fixed nose wheel and fixed main centre-line wheel and two retractable outrigger wheels. The aircraft has an empty weight of 47 kg (104 lb) and a gross weight of 180 kg (397 lb), giving a useful load of 133 kg (293 lb).

A number of different wings can be fitted to the basic carriage, including the standard Ellipse Titan and the optional Ellipse Fuji.

== Specifications (Monotrace) ==
Data from Bayerl and AEF

General characteristics

- Crew: one
- Length: 2.5 m (8 ft 2 in)
- Empty weight: 47 kg (104 lb)
- Gross weight: 180 kg (397 lb)
- Fuel capacity: 16 litres (3.5 imp gal; 4.2 US gal)
- Powerplant: 1 × Simonini Mini 3 air-cooled, two stroke aircraft engine, 25 kW (33 hp)
- Propellers: 2-bladed wooden

== See also ==
- Electravia Monotrace-E, an electric-powered variant
