= Étuz =

- Commune
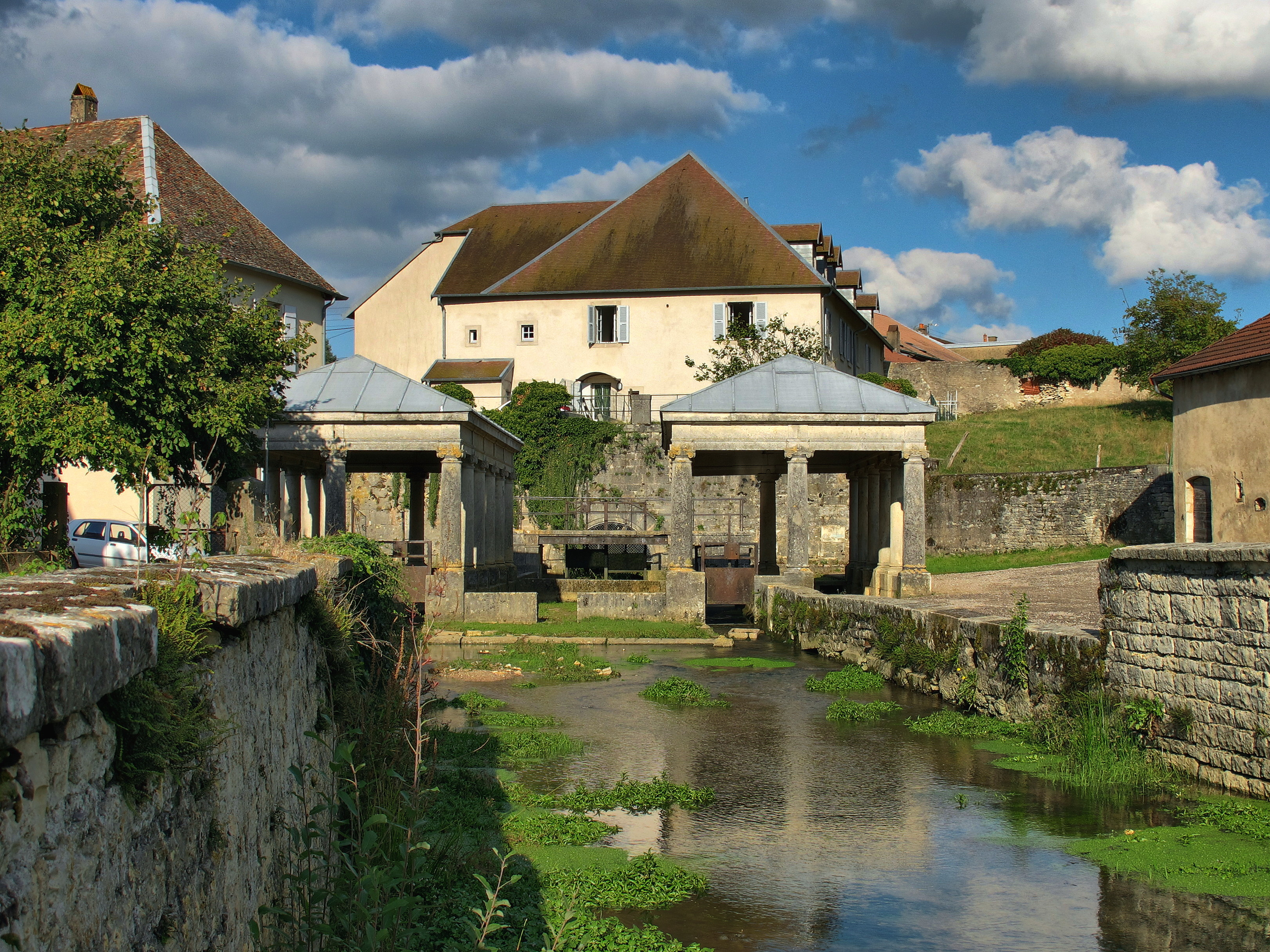
- The wash houses in Étuz

- Coat of arms
- Location of Étuz
- Location within France Location within Bourgogne-Franche-Comté
- Coordinates: 47°21′02″N 5°56′25″E
- Country: France
- Region: Bourgogne-Franche-Comté
- Department: Haute-Saône
- Arrondissement: Vesoul
- Canton: Marnay
- Area^{1}: 5.30 km^{2} (2.05 sq mi)
- Highest elevation: 267 m (876 ft)
- Lowest elevation: 207 m (679 ft)
- Population (2023): 713
  - Density: 135/km^{2} (348/sq mi)
- Time zone: UTC+01:00 (CET)
  - Summer (DST): UTC+02:00 (CEST)
- INSEE/Postal code: 70224 /70150
- ^{1} French Land Register data, which excludes lakes, ponds, glaciers > 1 km^{2} (0.386 sq mi or 247 acres) and river estuaries.

Étuz is a commune in the Haute-Saône department in the region of Bourgogne-Franche-Comté in eastern France.

== See also ==
- Communes of the Haute-Saône department
