= Sauvagnon =

- Commune
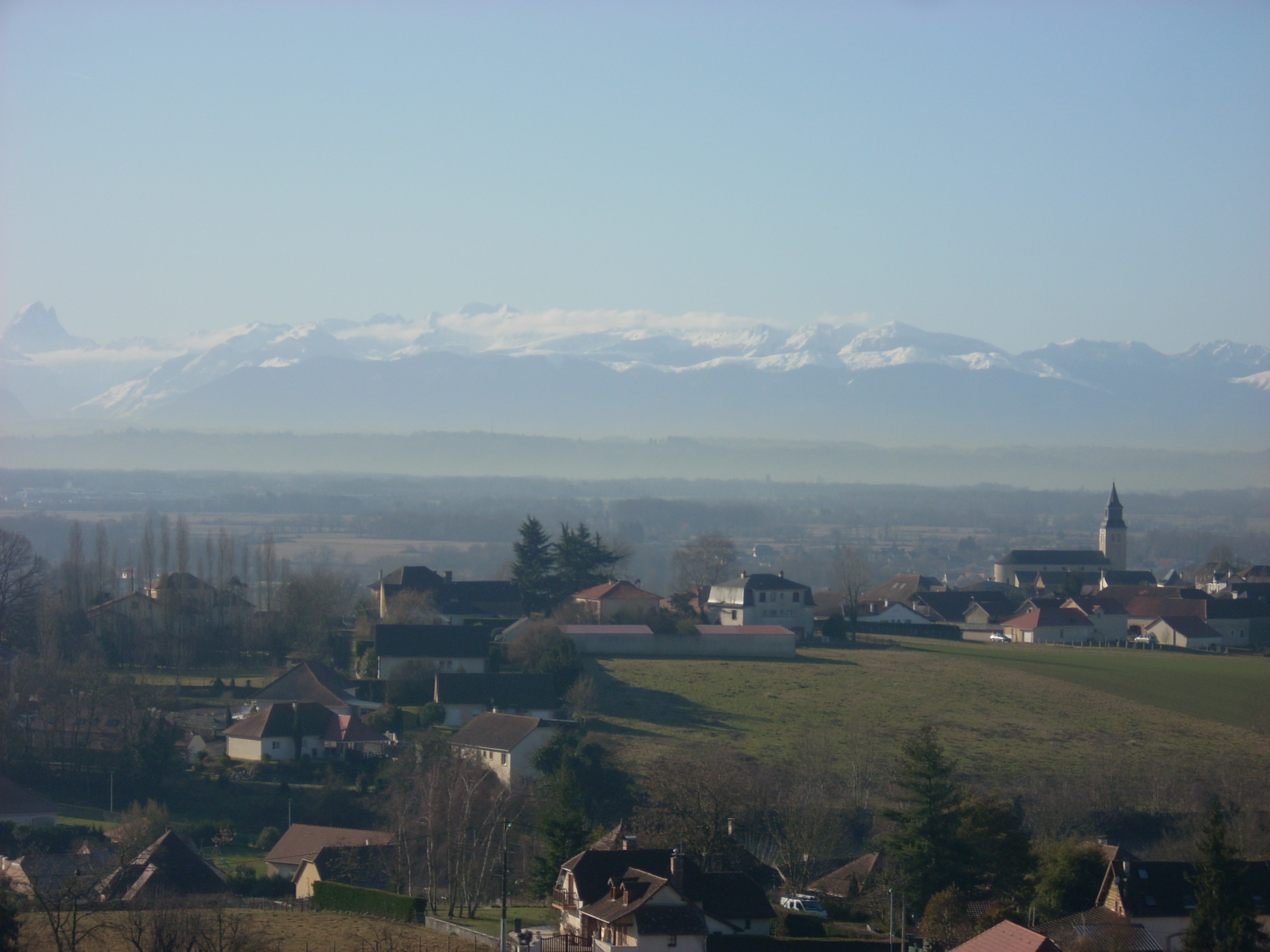
- A general view of Sauvagnon
- Location of Sauvagnon
- Location within France Location within Nouvelle-Aquitaine
- Coordinates: 43°24′18″N 0°23′10″W
- Country: France
- Region: Nouvelle-Aquitaine
- Department: Pyrénées-Atlantiques
- Arrondissement: Pau
- Canton: Terres des Luys et Coteaux du Vic-Bilh

Government
  - Mayor (2020–2026): Bernard Peyroulet
- Area^{1}: 16.74 km^{2} (6.46 sq mi)
- Elevation: 202 m (663 ft)
- Highest elevation: 283 m (928 ft)
- Lowest elevation: 166 m (545 ft)
- Population (2023): 3,579
  - Density: 213.8/km^{2} (553.7/sq mi)
- Time zone: UTC+01:00 (CET)
  - Summer (DST): UTC+02:00 (CEST)
- INSEE/Postal code: 64511 /64230
- ^{1} French Land Register data, which excludes lakes, ponds, glaciers > 1 km^{2} (0.386 sq mi or 247 acres) and river estuaries.

Sauvagnon (French pronunciation: [sovaɲɔ̃]; Occitan: Sauvanhon) is a commune in the Pyrénées-Atlantiques department in south-western France.

== Population ==
Historical population
| Year | Pop. | ±% p.a. |
|---|---|---|
| 1968 | 635 | — |
| 1975 | 998 | +6.67% |
| 1982 | 1,697 | +7.88% |
| 1990 | 1,970 | +1.88% |
| 1999 | 2,351 | +1.98% |
| 2007 | 2,915 | +2.72% |
| 2012 | 3,083 | +1.13% |
| 2017 | 3,313 | +1.45% |
| 2023 | 3,579 | +1.30% |
Source: INSEE

== See also ==
- Communes of the Pyrénées-Atlantiques department
