= Vaumeilh =

- Commune
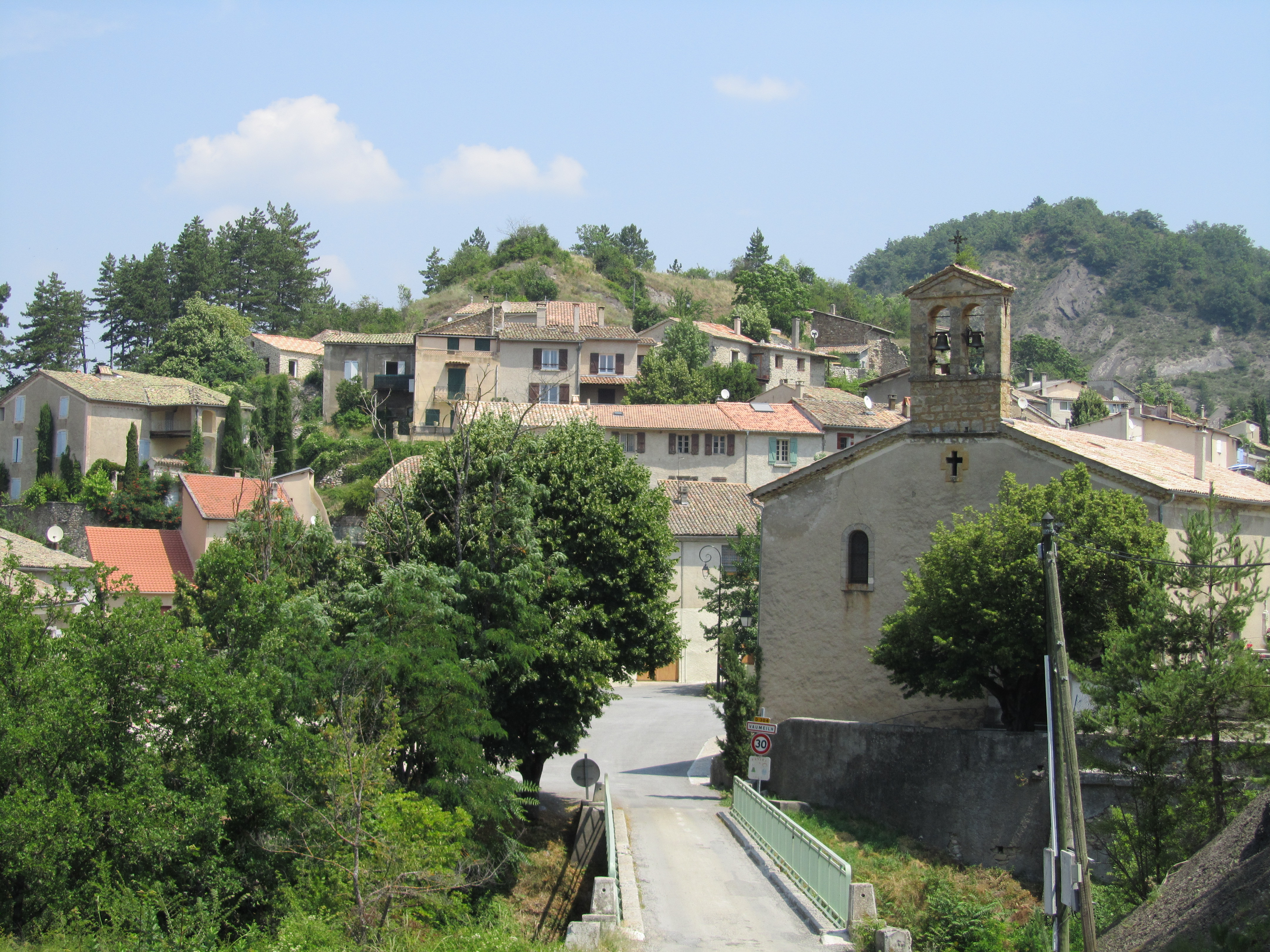
- The church and surrounding buildings in Vaumeilh

- Coat of arms
- Location of Vaumeilh
- Location within France Location within Provence-Alpes-Côte d'Azur
- Coordinates: 44°17′21″N 5°57′35″E
- Country: France
- Region: Provence-Alpes-Côte d'Azur
- Department: Alpes-de-Haute-Provence
- Arrondissement: Forcalquier
- Canton: Seyne

Government
  - Mayor (2026–32): Marjorie Texeire
- Area^{1}: 25.52 km^{2} (9.85 sq mi)
- Elevation: 600 m (2,000 ft)
- Highest elevation: 1,055 m (3,461 ft)
- Lowest elevation: 460 m (1,510 ft)
- Population (2023): 270
  - Density: 11/km^{2} (27/sq mi)
- Time zone: UTC+01:00 (CET)
  - Summer (DST): UTC+02:00 (CEST)
- INSEE/Postal code: 04233 /04200
- ^{1} French Land Register data, which excludes lakes, ponds, glaciers > 1 km^{2} (0.386 sq mi or 247 acres) and river estuaries.

Vaumeilh (French pronunciation: [vomɛj]; Occitan: Vaumelha) is a commune in the Alpes-de-Haute-Provence department in the Provence-Alpes-Côte d'Azur region in southeastern France.

== Geography ==
It is a small Provençal village with narrow, winding streets which backs on to a hill. The Durance flows 1 km (0.62 mi) away below a plateau which grows mainly cereals and apples and also supports some livestock.

== Origin of the name ==
The most common theory is that the name comes from the Latin word 'Vallis Mellis' which is translated as valley of honey. Charles Rostaing suggested that the name sounds like a word for mountain and so this might be its origin. Ernest Nègre proposed that the name is composed of the Latin word 'vallem' and the Roman name 'Maelius'.

== History ==
The village was mentioned, as 'Vaumel', for the first time in charters dated 1171. It was occupied by Protestants at the end of the French Wars of Religion. A 'patriotic society' was created in the spring of 1792, which was one of 21 in the department of Alpes-de-Haute-Provence to debate political matters.

== Administration ==
List of mayors:

- March 1989 - March 1995 Louis Touche
- March 1995 - March 2001 Jean-Marie Collombon
- March 2001 - March 2008 Georges Richaud
- March 2008 - to date Élisabeth Collombon

== Population ==
The inhabitants are called Vaumeilhois in French.

Historical population

Year	Pop.	±% p.a.
1793	609	—
1821	461	−0.99%
1846	567	+0.83%
1872	522	−0.32%
1901	345	−1.42%
1926	282	−0.80%
1946	198	−1.75%
1962	170	−0.95%
1968	159	−1.11%

Year	Pop.	±% p.a.
1975	152	−0.64%
1982	159	+0.65%
1990	170	+0.84%
1999	197	+1.65%
2007	276	+4.31%
2012	265	−0.81%
2017	262	−0.23%
2023	270	+0.50%

Source: EHESS and INSEE

== Sights ==
- A priory, Notre-Dame de Chane, existed in 1210, and depended on the monastery in Aniane. It fell in ruins in 1469, was given to the Church of Gap, which rebuilt it with mainly agricultural objectives around a triple court between the end of the 17th century and the French Revolution. A dovecote which is the oldest in the department dating from the 15th or 16th centuries was built almost entirely out of large boulders.
- The parish church was built in 1667. It has fine stained glass and marble statues
- The chapel of Saint Marcellin, below the village, was built around 1770
- There is a monument to the fourteen dead of the First World War
- A tower remains from an ancient feudal manor that was destroyed during the French Revolution
- The town square (Place de Trois Torrents) was enlarged adding a children's play area and a "kiosk" (bandstand). This was formally opened 10 July 2010.
- The "sentier des Contes" (the Tales' Path) starting from Fombeton Bridge is part of the "Trail of Talking Rocks". A special booklet available from tourist offices when pressed to the right rock will trigger an electronic story about the location.
- The airfield midway between Vaumeilh and Thèze is well known for the sport of gliding and attracts many visitors each year for flights and for its restaurant

== See also ==
- Communes of the Alpes-de-Haute-Provence department
