= Serramazzoni =

- Comune
- Comune di Serramazzoni
- Coat of arms

- Location within Italy Location within Emilia-Romagna
- Coordinates: 44°25′N 10°48′E
- Country: Italy
- Region: Emilia-Romagna
- Province: Modena (MO)
- Frazioni: Casa Bartolacelli-Stella, Faeto, Granarolo, Ligorzano, Monfestino, Montagnana, Montardone, Pazzano, Pompeano, Rocca Santa Maria, Riccò, San Dalmazio, Selva, Valle, Varana

Government
  - Mayor: Simona Ferrari

Area
  - Total: 93.96 km^{2} (36.28 sq mi)
- Elevation: 791 m (2,595 ft)

Population (1-1-2019)
  - Total: 8,430
  - Density: 89.7/km^{2} (232/sq mi)
- Demonym: Serramazzonese(i)
- Time zone: UTC+1 (CET)
  - Summer (DST): UTC+2 (CEST)
- Postal code: 41028
- Dialing code: 0536
- ISTAT code: 036042
- Patron saint: Blessed Virgin of the Rosary
- Saint day: May 8
- Website: Official website

Serramazzoni (Serramazzonese: La Sèra) is a comune (municipality) in the Province of Modena in the Italian region Emilia-Romagna, located about 45 kilometres (28 mi) west of Bologna and about 30 kilometres (19 mi) southwest of Modena.

Serramazzoni borders the following municipalities: Fiorano Modenese, Maranello, Marano sul Panaro, Pavullo nel Frignano, Polinago, Prignano sulla Secchia, Sassuolo.

== History ==
The first historical mention of Serramazzoni dates to 1327, when it was called Serra de Legorzano.

== Main sights ==
- Falls of Rio delle Borre
- Via Vandelli
- Sasso delle Streghe
- Salsa della Cintora
- Falls of Bucamante
- National Museum of Antic Rose
- Romanesque Church of Santa Maria Assunta

== Districts ==
Serramazzoni is divided into the districts: Casa Bartolacelli-Stella, Faeto, Ligorzano, Monfestino, Montagnana, Pazzano, Pompeano, Rocca Santa Maria, Riccò, San Dalmazio, Selva, Valle, Varana.

== People ==
- Gianni Bui, football player
- Luca Toni, football player
