= Sauer Flugmotorenbau =

German aircraft engine manufacturer

Sauer Flugmotorenbau GmbH
- Sauer Company Logo
- Company type: Company with limited liability
- Industry: Aerospace
- Headquarters: Ober-Olm, Germany
- Key people: Liliana and Martin Manthey
- Products: Engines, Engine maintenance, Aviation Products
- Website: Sauer Flugmotorenbau

Sauer Flugmotorenbau (Sauer Aircraft Engines) or "Sauer" is a German manufacturer of aircraft engines based at Ober-Olm in Germany.

== History ==
The first certified 4 stroke engine entered the market in 1987. The 4 stroke engines are certified according to CS-22 Subpart H for use in motorgliders, CS-LSA and CS-VLA type of aircraft. They also makes engines for use in ultralights and Homebuilt aircraft. The production consist of 4 stroke engines based on VW "Type 1" engines (commonly known as air-cooled beetle engines) and based on the later Volkswagen Wasserboxer engine. Sauer also makes 2-stroke engines. There have been development of a turbocharged 2 cylinder 4 stroke engine based on the Weber MPE "recreational engine" in 2009-2010, but no commercial available engine exists to date.

== Products ==
There are two main versions of the boxer 4-stroke engines. Those with the casing of air-cooled beetle engines, and those with the largely similar, but stronger Wasserboxer casing used in late VW vans before the Volkswagen Transporter (T4).

Even though the Wasserboxer engine is water-cooled, this involves only the cylinders and the top. The casing has no water lines, it is only stronger built. This makes it possible to convert the Wasserboxer "back" to an air-cooled engine. The benefits of this conversion is the added strength, and the size of the Wasserboxer casing will accept larger cylinders. In general it becomes a much more robust engine compared with engines using the original air-cooled casing. These "water to air" converted engines are sometimes referred to as the misnomer oxyboxer in automobile VW engine circles.

=== 4 Stroke engines for experimental and ultralight ===
- Sauer S 1800 UL - 68 HP, in production
- Sauer S 1900 UL - 75 HP, in production
- Sauer S 2100 UL - 80 HP, replaced by the S 2200 UL. Sometimes referred to as Sauer 2100/2200 UL. The specs are identical to the S 2100 certified engine.
- Sauer S 2200 UL - 85 HP, in production
- Sauer S 2400 UL - 100 HP, in production
- Sauer S 2100 ULT - 115 HP Turbo, Volkswagen Wasserboxer engine casing, probably still in production
- Sauer S 2500 UL - 100 HP, Wasserboxer casing, obsolete
- Sauer S 2500 ULT - 126 HP, Wasserboxer casing, obsolete
- Sauer S 2700 UL - 105 HP, Wasserboxer casing, obsolete (appears as a "UL" in old price lists. Uncertain if a certified version also existed)

=== 4 Stroke certified engines ===
- Sauer S 1800 - 60 HP, 3 variants, in production
- Sauer S 2100 - 80 HP, 2 variants, in production
- Sauer S 2500 - 94-100 HP, Wasserboxer casing, 4 variants, in production
- Sauer S 2500 T - 126 HP, Wasserboxer casing, obsolete

=== 2 Stroke Engines ===
Various engines from 14.9 to 100 HP, single cylinder to 3 cylinder. These engines are re-branded Hirth engines built by Sauer. The specifications are identical to the corresponding Hirth engine.

- Sauer S 210 - 210cc, 14.9 HP, (Hirth F-36)
- Sauer S 330 - 313cc, 28 HP, (Hirth F-33)
- Sauer S 550 - 521cc, 50 HP, (Hirth F-23)
- Sauer S 625 - 625cc, 65 HP, (Hirth 3203)
- Sauer S 650 - 625cc, 70 HP, (Hirth 3503)
- Sauer S 950 R - 939cc, 86 HP, (Hirth 3702)
- Sauer S 950 R 100 - 935cc, 100 HP, (Hirth 3701)

== Applications ==
- Groppo Trial
- AMS Carat
- Alpi Pioneer 200
- Scheibe SF 36
- Scheibe SF 25
- Skyranger SW
- As a drop in replacement in older Motorgliders originally fitted with Limbach engines.

== Naming ==
=== 4 stroke certified engines ===
The naming format changed in 2003. The current naming format is: S aaaa-(b)-(XYZ)c

- S refers to Sauer Flugmotorenbau GmbH
- aaaa refers to engine displacement in (approximate) cubic centimeters (cc)
- b=1 for single ignition, b=2 for double ignition
- X is a letter describing a particular equipment
- Y is a letter describing the propeller flange
- Z is a letter for a special utilization
- c=1 for hydraulic valve lifters

Whereas the old naming format found in older engines is:

- S X aaaa Y b Z
- S refers to Sauer Flugmotorenbau GmbH
- X is a letter describing a particular equipment (A or S)
- aaaa refers to engine displacement in (approximate) cubic centimeters (cc)
- Y is a letter describing hydraulic valve lifters (Y = H)
- b=1 for single ignition, b=2 for double ignition
- Z is a letter describing the propeller flange

=== 4 stroke engines for experimental and ultralight aviation ===
There is no defined naming for these engines from the manufacturer, but they all are named according to:

- S aaaa UL(T)
- S refers to Sauer Flugmotorenbau GmbH
- aaaa refers to engine displacement in (approximate) cubic centimeters (cc)
- UL refers to Ultralight
- T refers to Turbo
