= Weslake A80 =

Weslake
- Type: Opposed-piston two-stroke diesel aero engine
- National origin: UK
- Manufacturer: Weslake

The Weslake A80 is a liquid cooled, two-stroke, opposed piston, 1332 cc Diesel aircraft engine, produced by Weslake.

== Design and development ==
This opposed piston aero-engine appears superficially similar to a true flat-four "boxer" engine, but is actually significantly different. It has two ported cylinders with a crankshaft at each end and four pistons in total. This engine is similar to the prototype Diesel Air engine, which was built for Diesel Air by Weslake, but which has to date failed to reach volume production.

Each crankshaft is linked by an idler gear to a centre shaft.

== Applications ==
- none to date

== Specifications ==
Reference: Coulson

=== General characteristics ===
- Type: opposed piston
- Bore: 72mm
- Stroke: 77 mm
- Displacement: 1332 cm^{3}
- Length: 505mm
- Width: 614mm
- Height: 485mm
- Dry weight: 71.5 kg (dry)

=== Components ===
- Valvetrain: none (ports)
- Fuel system: fuel injection
- Fuel type: AVTUR (diesel)
- Cooling system: liquid cooling

=== Performance ===
- Power output: 80 hp (60 kW) at 2450 RPM
- Fuel consumption: 0.41 lb/hph
- Power-to-weight ratio: kW/kg

== See also ==
Comparable engines

- HKS 700E
- Jabiru 2200
- KFM 112M
- Revmaster R-2300
- Rotax 912
- Sauer S 2200 UL
- Sauer S 2400 UL
- Sauer S 2100 ULT
- ULPower UL260i
- Verner 133M

Related lists

- List of aircraft engines
