= Sauer S 2500 =

- Type: Horizontally-opposed piston aircraft engine
- National origin: Germany
- Manufacturer: Sauer Flugmotorenbau GmbH
- Major applications: Motorgliders and light aircraft
- Developed from: Volkswagen Wasserboxer engine

The Sauer S 2500 is a family of four-stroke aircraft engines certified according to JAR 22-H (CS-22 subpart H)

== Design and development ==
The engine is based on the Volkswagen Wasserboxer engine, extensively modified for aircraft use and all the parts are custom made. They are certified according to CS-22 subpart H and can therefore be used in motorgliders and light aircraft that are certified as CS-VLA and CS-LSA

== Variants ==
Sauer S 2500-1-DS1
Sauer S 2500-1-TS1
Sauer S 2500-1-HS1
Sauer S 2500-1-FS1
Sauer S 2500 T
A 126 hp (94 kW) turbocharged version no longer available and unknown if it ever was available commercially.

== Specifications ==
=== General characteristics ===
- Bore: 97mm
- Stroke: 84mm
- Displacement: 2483cc
- Dry weight: 77 kg

=== Components ===
- Valvetrain: Single overhead exhaust valve, single overhead inlet valve per cylinder
- Fuel system: Bing carburetor with altitude compensation
- Fuel type: min 98 RON
- Cooling system: Air-cooled

=== Performance ===
- Power output: 94hp at 3000 rpm, 100hp at 3200 rpm (S 2500-1-FS1)
- Compression ratio: 8.8:1

== See also ==
- Sauer Engines
