= Sauer S 2700 UL =

German aircraft engine

Sauer S 2700UL
- Type: Horizontally-opposed piston engine
- National origin: Germany
- Manufacturer: Sauer Flugmotorenbau GmbH
- Major applications: Experimental Aircraft
- Developed from: Volkswagen Wasserboxer engine

The Sauer S 2700 UL were a four-stroke aircraft engine for homebuilt aircraft

== Design and development ==
The engine is based on the Volkswagen Wasserboxer engine. It is extensively modified for aircraft use and all the parts are custom made. These engines are derived from the certified engines produced by the same manufacturer and used in several motorgliders and small aircraft. This particular engine must be one of the largest displacement VW conversions that have been built, but it is unknown if it ever entered production.

== Specifications (S 2700 UL) ==
=== General characteristics ===
- Bore: 97mm
- Stroke: 90mm
- Displacement: 2660cc
- Dry weight: 75 kg

=== Components ===
- Valvetrain: Single overhead exhaust valve, single overhead inlet valve per cylinder
- Fuel system: Bing carburetor with altitude compensation
- Fuel type: min 98 RON
- Cooling system: Air-cooled

=== Performance ===
- Power output: 105hp at 3000 rpm
- Compression ratio: 10:1

== See also ==
Sauer engines
