= Sauer S 2500 UL =

Sauer S 2500UL
- Type: Horizontally opposed piston engine
- National origin: Germany
- Manufacturer: Sauer Flugmotorenbau GmbH
- Major applications: Experimental Aircraft
- Developed from: Volkswagen Wasserboxer engine

The Sauer S 2500 UL and Sauer S 2500 ULT are four-stroke aircraft engines for homebuilt aircraft.

== Design and development ==
The engines are based on the Volkswagen Wasserboxer engine. They are extensively modified for aircraft use and all the parts are custom made. These engines are derived from the certified engines produced by the same manufacturer and used in several motorgliders and light aircraft.

== Variants ==
- Sauer S 2500 UL
- Sauer S 2500 ULT

== Applications ==
- Homebuilt aircraft

== Specifications (variant) ==
=== General characteristics ===
- Bore: 97mm
- Stroke: 84mm
- Displacement: 2483cc
- Dry weight: 74-83 kg

=== Components ===
- Valvetrain: Single overhead exhaust valve, single overhead inlet valve per cylinder
- Fuel system: Bing carburetor with altitude compensation
- Fuel type: min 98 RON
- Cooling system: Air-cooled

=== Performance ===
- Power output: 100hp at 3000 rpm, 126hp at 3000 rpm (turbo)
- Compression ratio: 9:1, 8:1 (turbo)

== See also ==
- Sauer engines
