= Rotax 912 =

Four cylinder piston aircraft engine

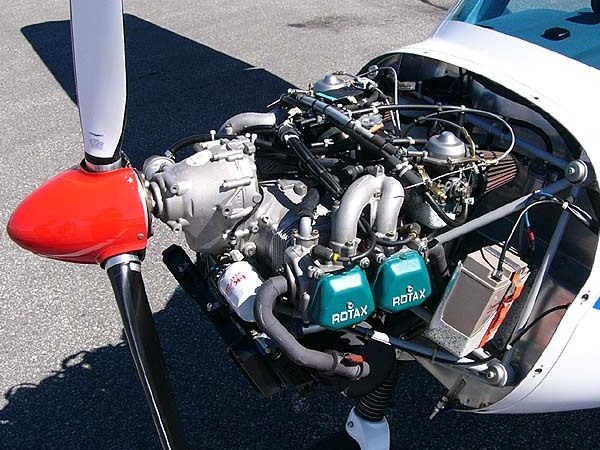
- Rotax 912ULS 100 hp (75 kW) installation in a 3Xtrim 3X55 Trener
- Type: Piston aircraft engine
- National origin: Austria
- Manufacturer: Rotax Aircraft Engines
- First run: 1984
- Major applications: Light sport aircraft; Ultralight aircraft
- Manufactured: 1989–present
- Variants: Rotax 914; Rotax 915 iS

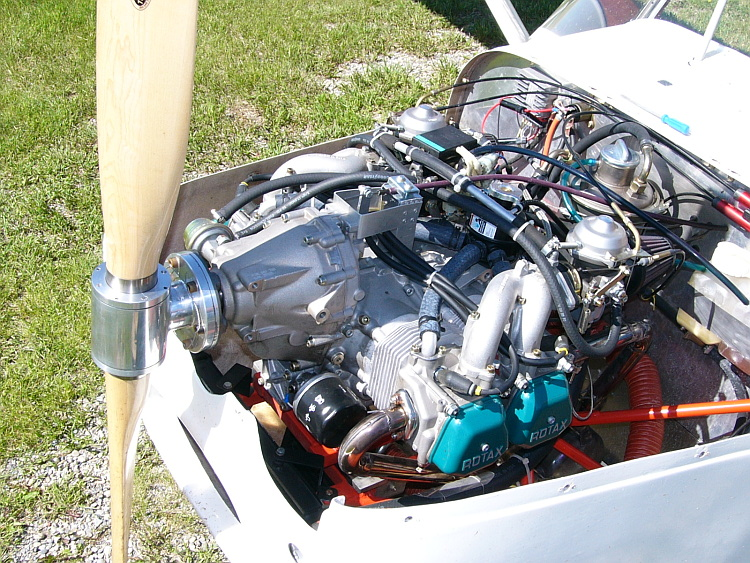
Rotax 912ULS 100 hp (75 kW) installation in a Blue Yonder Merlin EZ

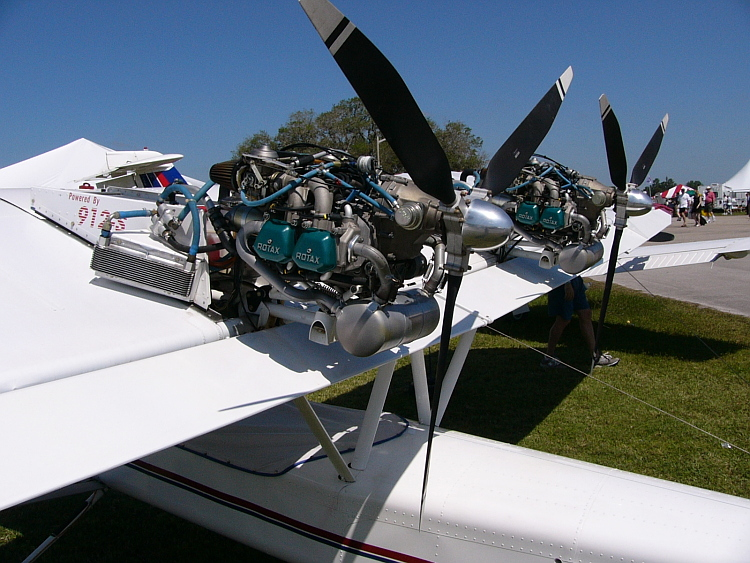
Pusher engine installation of two Rotax 912ULSs in a Lockwood Aircam

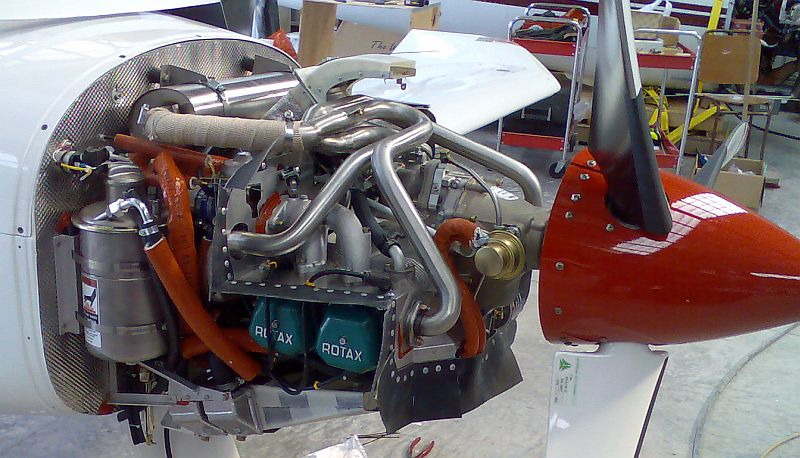
Rotax 912ULS with tuned exhaust in a Dyn'Aéro MCR01 with 3-blade hydraulic CSU propeller

The Rotax 912 is a horizontally-opposed four-cylinder, naturally-aspirated, four-stroke aircraft engine with a reduction gearbox. It features liquid-cooled cylinder heads and air-cooled cylinders. Originally equipped with carburetors, later versions are fuel injected. Dominating the market for small aircraft and kitplanes, Rotax produced its 50,000th 912-series engine in 2014. Originally available only for light sport aircraft, ultralight aircraft, autogyros and drones, the 912-series engine was approved for certified aircraft in 1995.

In the 2020s, the engine is used in unmanned aerial vehicle (UAV) applications, such as the UAE REACH-S drone.

== Design and development ==
The Rotax 912 was first sold in 1989 in non-certificated form for use in ultralights and motorgliders. The original 60 kW (80 hp) 912 UL engine has a capacity of 1,211 cc (73.9 cu in) and a compression ratio of 9.1:1, and was designed to work with regular automotive gasoline, with up to 10% ethanol. The later certified 75 kW (100 hp) 912 ULS variant has a compression ratio of 11:1, and requires 91-octane ("premium") auto gas (100LL leaded avgas can be used, sparingly).

The engine differs from previous generation aircraft engines (such as the Lycoming O-235) in that it has air-cooled cylinders with liquid-cooled heads and uses a 2.43:1 PSRU reduction gearbox to reduce the engine's relatively high 5,800 rpm shaft speed to a more conventional 2,400 rpm for the propeller. The gearbox has proven to be generally trouble-free. On the 912A, F and UL the standard reduction ratio is 2.27:1 with 2.43:1 optional. Lubrication is dry sump, and fuel is supplied via dual CV carburetors, or fully redundant electronic fuel injection in the 912iS.

The 912's lubrication system differs from most dry-sump designs in that oil is forced into the storage tank by crankcase pressure rather than by a separate scavenge pump. This requires a novel preflight inspection procedure: before checking the oil level with the dipstick, the engine is "burped" by removing the oil filler cap and turning the propeller until a gurgling sound is heard, which indicates that all oil has been forced into the tank and the oil level can now be checked accurately.

A relatively unique feature is the inclusion of an overload clutch fitted as standard in all certified engines, and most non-certified models. In the event of a prop strike, the clutch disengages the prop from the drivetrain to avoid engine damage, and in many cases an expensive overhaul can be avoided. The gearbox is removed and inspected, and if the crankshaft is not out of round, the engine can be reassembled and placed back into service. A torsional shock absorber consisting of 2 dog gears serves to smooth the power pulses and reduce gearbox wear during startup and shutdown.

The 912 is more fuel efficient and lighter than comparable older engines, e.g., Continental O-200, but originally had a shorter time between overhaul (TBO). On introduction, the TBO was only 600 hours, which was double that of previous Rotax engines but far short of existing engines of comparable size and power. The short TBO and lack of certification for use in factory-built type certificated aircraft initially restricted its worldwide market potential. However, the engine received US Federal Aviation Administration (FAA) certification in 1995, and by 1999, the TBO had increased to 1,200 hours; on 14 December 2009, the TBO was raised from 1,200 hours to 1,500 hours, or 1,500 hours to 2,000 hours, depending on serial number. In addition to the lower fuel consumption, the 912 is certified to run on automotive fuel (mogas), further reducing running costs, especially in areas where leaded avgas is not readily available. The 912 may be operated using leaded fuel, however this will require more frequent maintenance when used more than 30% of the time. This is due to the accumulation of lead sludge in the oil tank, on spark plugs, and in older gearboxes which do not have an updated design that slings buildup away from the gears.

A turbocharged variant rated at 86 kW (115 hp), the Rotax 914, was introduced in 1996. In 1999, the 912S / ULS were introduced; enlarged to 1,352 cubic centimetres (82.5 cu in) with a compression ratio of 10.8:1, yielding 75 kW (100 hp). The 912S is certified, as are the A and F, which are used in the Diamond DA20, which is quite popular in Europe. The 912's popularity was greatly enhanced by the introduction of the light-sport aircraft category in Europe and the United States, which resulted in the introduction of many factory-built aircraft designed to fully exploit the engine's small size and light weight. The 75 kW (100 hp) versions are used in many light sport aircraft, such as the Zenith STOL CH 701 and the Tecnam P2002 Sierra. The 60 kW (80 hp) versions are sufficient to power the new generation of efficient motorgliders, such as the Pipistrel Sinus and the Urban Air Lambada. It is also fitted to some light twins, such as the Tecnam P2006T.

On 8 March 2012, the company announced the 912 iS variant, a 75 kW (100 hp) version with fuel injection and FADEC, with ECUs supplied by Rockwell Collins. The version weighs 63 kg (139 lb), which is 6 kg (13 lb) more than the standard 912S. The non-certified 912 iS targets the light sport and homebuilt aircraft market and 912 iSc will be certified. Production started in March 2012, and the engine has a 2000-hour recommended time-between-overhaul.

On 1 April 2014, the company announced its new 912 iS Sport upgrade with greater power, torque, and reduced fuel consumption. A derivative, the 100 kW (140 hp) Rotax 915 iS, was announced in July 2015, and a further upgrade, the 120 kW (160 hp) Rotax 916 iS was announced in March 2023.

=== Rotax's warnings to flyers ===
Rotax publishes extensive warnings in the owner's manual about both the certified and non-certified versions of the engine design. Pilots are cautioned that the 912 engine is not suitable for:

- use in situations where a safe landing cannot be made
- use in rotorcraft
- night flying (unless equipped with redundant electrical power), or
- aerobatics.

== Variants ==
The engine is available in the following versions; coloured cylinder head caps are used to easily identify the different horsepower ranges:

912 A#
Certified to JAR 22, 60 kW (80 hp), with dual carburetors and electronic ignition. Black cylinder head caps
912 F#
Certified to FAR 33, 60 kW (80 hp), with dual carburetors and electronic ignition. Black cylinder head caps
912 iS
Uncertified, 75 kW (100 hp) with direct fuel injection and an electronic engine management unit. Green cylinder head caps
912 iSc
Certified, 75 kW (100 hp) with direct fuel injection and an electronic engine management unit
912 iS Sport
Uncertified, aluminum airbox, longer intake runners and eco-mode when operated below 97% power setting. Green cylinder head caps
912 iSC Sport

Green cylinder head caps

912 S#
Certified to FAR 33, 75 kW (100 hp) with larger bore than 912A/F/UL, with dual carburetors and electronic ignition. Green cylinder head caps
912 UL#
Uncertified, 60 kW (80 hp), similar to the 912A/F. Black cylinder head caps
912 ULS#
Uncertified, 75 kW (100 hp), similar to the 912S. Green cylinder head caps
912 ULSFR#
Uncertified French Authority specification. 75 kW (100 hp)

The # in the designation stands for:

1. Shaft with flange for fixed pitch propeller, P.C.D. 100 mm
2. Shaft with flange for fixed pitch propeller, P.C.D. 75 mm, P.C.D. 80 mm and P.C.D. 4 inches
3. Shaft with flange for constant speed propeller P.C.D. 75 mm, P.C.D. 80 mm, P.C.D. 4 inches and drive for hydraulic governor for constant speed propeller
4. Shaft with flange for fixed pitch propeller P.C.D. 75 mm, P.C.D. 80 mm, P.C.D. 4 inches also can be fitted with an adaptor, drive and governor for a constant speed propeller.

== Specifications (Rotax 912 UL/A/F) ==
=== General characteristics ===
- Type: four-cylinder, four-stroke liquid / air-cooled engine with opposed cylinders, dry sump forced lubrication with separate oil tank, automatic adjustment by hydraulic valve tappet, dual CD carburetors, mechanical diaphragm pump, electronic dual ignition, electric starter, integrated reduction gear 1 : 2.273 or 1 : 2.43
- Bore: 79.5 mm (3.13 in)
- Stroke: 61 mm (2.40 in)
- Displacement: 1,211.2 cm^{3} (73.91 in^{3})
- Length: 561 mm (22.1 in)
- Width: 576 mm (22.7 in)
- Dry weight: 60 kg (132.3 lb) with electric starter, carburetors, fuel pump, air filters and oil system

=== Components ===
- Valvetrain: OHV, hydraulic lifters, pushrods, rocker arms
- Fuel type: Unleaded: 87 octane AKI (Canada/USA) / 90 octane RON (European) or higher. Leaded fuel and AVGAS 100 LL can be used but are not recommended.
- Oil system: Dry sump with trochoid pump, camshaft driven
- Cooling system: Liquid-cooled cylinder heads, air-cooled cylinders

=== Performance ===
- Power output: 59.6 kW (79.9 hp) at 5,800 rpm

Power density: 48.71 kW/L

- Compression ratio: 9:1
- Fuel consumption: 15.0 liters/h at 5,000 rpm (75% power)
- Specific fuel consumption: 285 g/(kW·h) at 5,500 rpm (maximum continuous power)

Specific power: 0.98 kW/kg

== See also ==
Comparable engines

- Arrow 1000
- D-Motor LF26
- Hirth 3701
- Hirth F-30
- HKS 700E
- Jabiru 2200
- KFM 112M
- Pegasus PAL 95
- Revmaster R-2300
- Sauer S 2200 UL
- Sauer S 2100 ULT
- Sauer S 2400 UL
- ULPower UL260i

Related lists

- List of aircraft engines
