= Sauer S 1800 UL =

German four stroke aircraft engine

- Type: Horizontally opposed piston engine
- National origin: Germany
- Manufacturer: Sauer Flugmotorenbau GmbH
- Major applications: Ultralight and homebuilt aircraft
- Developed from: Volkswagen air-cooled engine

The Sauer S 1800 UL is a four stroke aircraft engine designed for homebuilt and ultralight aircraft.

== Design and development ==
The engine is based on the Volkswagen air-cooled engine. It is extensively modified for aircraft use and all the parts are custom made. The engine is derived from the certified engines produced by the same manufacturer and used in several motorgliders and small aircraft.

== Applications ==
- Alpi Pioneer 200

== Specifications (variant) ==
=== General characteristics ===
- Bore: 92mm
- Stroke: 69mm
- Displacement: 1835cc
- Dry weight: 63 kg

=== Components ===
- Valvetrain: Single overhead exhaust valve, single overhead inlet valve per cylinder
- Fuel system: Bing carburetor with altitude compensation
- Fuel type: min 95 RON
- Cooling system: Air-cooled

=== Performance ===
- Power output: 68hp at 3200 rpm
- Compression ratio: 8.5:1

== See also ==
- Sauer Engines
