= Sauer S 1900 UL =

- Type: Horizontally opposed piston engine
- National origin: Germany
- Manufacturer: Sauer Flugmotorenbau GmbH
- Major applications: Ultralights and Experimental Aircraft
- Developed from: Volkswagen air-cooled engine

The Sauer S 1900 UL is a 4 stroke aircraft engine for homebuilt and ultralight aircraft.

== Design and development ==
The engine is based on the Volkswagen air-cooled engine. It is extensively modified for aircraft use and all the parts are custom made. The engine is derived from the certified engines produced by the same manufacturer and used in several motorgliders and light aircraft.

== Applications ==
- Skyranger SW

== Specifications ==
=== General characteristics ===
- Bore: 94 mm
- Stroke: 69 mm
- Displacement: 1,915 cc
- Dry weight: 64 kg

=== Components ===
- Valvetrain: Single overhead exhaust valve, single overhead inlet valve per cylinder
- Fuel system: Bing carburetor with altitude compensation
- Fuel type: min 95 RON
- Cooling system: Air-cooled

=== Performance ===
- Power output: 75 hp at 3,200 rpm
- Compression ratio: 8.5:1

== See also ==
- Sauer Engines
