= Scheibe SF 36 =

German touring motor glider, 1980

SF 36
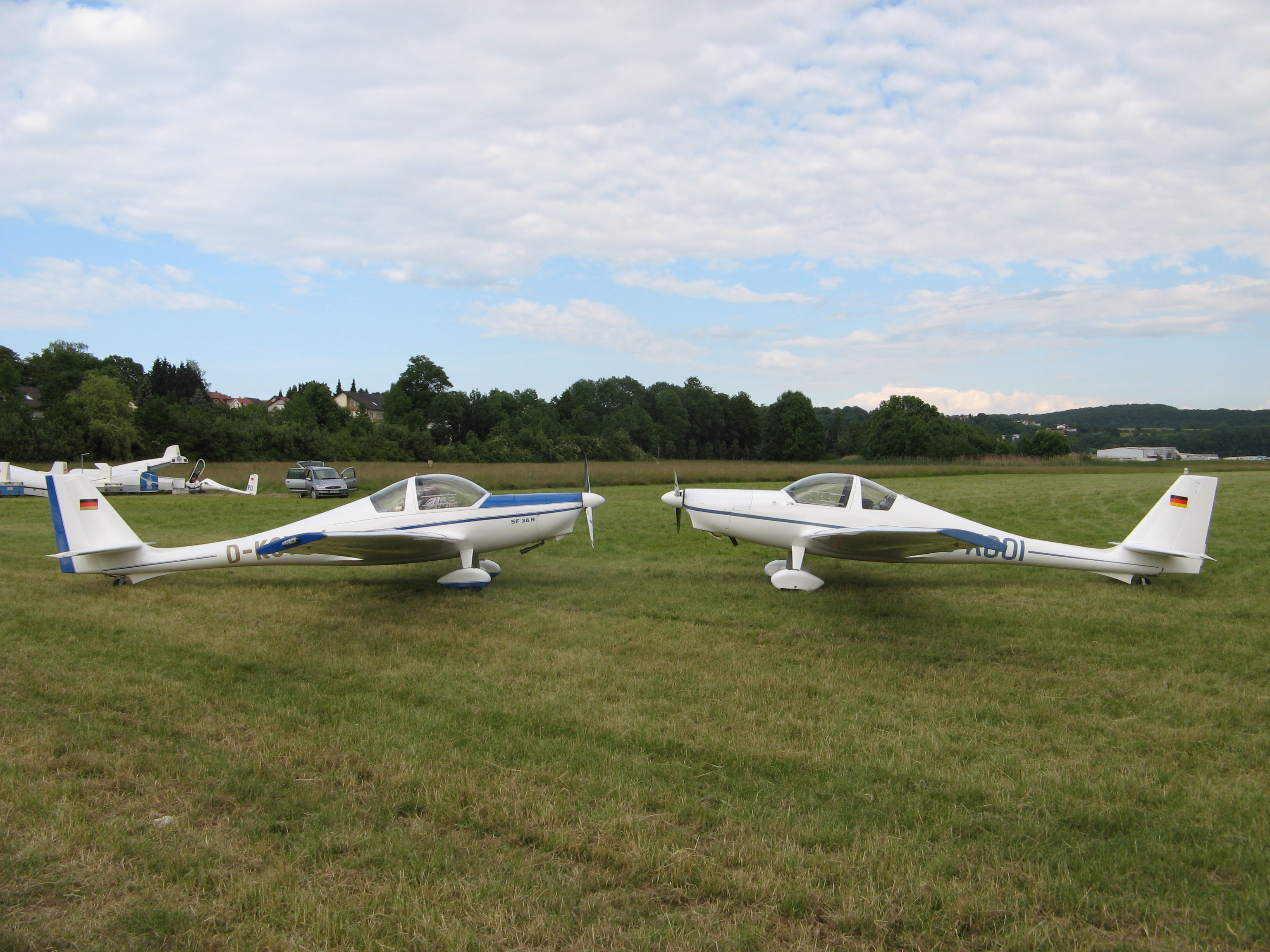

General information
- Type: Powered sailplane
- National origin: Germany
- Manufacturer: Scheibe Aircraft

History
- First flight: 1980

The Scheibe SF 36 is a German two-seat self-launched powered sailplane designed and built by Scheibe Aircraft.

== Design ==
The SF 36 is an all composite sailplane with an engine mounted at the front. It is a low-wing monoplane with airbrakes fitted to the upper surface, it can be fitted with either a fixed or retractable landing gear. The SF 36 has a cruciform tail with a fixed horizontal stabilizer and an enclosed cabin which has two seats side by side.

The SF 36 is available in two variants, the SF 36A powered by either a Limbach or Sauer piston engine, and the Rotax-powered SF 36R.

== Variants ==
SF 36 A
Powered by either a Limbach L2000 EA, Sauer S 2100-1-HS1 or Sauer S 2100-1-SS1 engine.
SF 36 R
Rotax 912-powered variant.

== Specifications (SF 36A) ==
Data from

General characteristics

- Crew: 2
- Length: 7.18 m (23 ft 7 in)
- Wingspan: 16.38 m (53 ft 9 in)
- Wing area: 15.60 m^{2} (168 sq ft)
- Gross weight: 715 kg (1,576 lb)
- Powerplant: 1 × Limbach L2000 EA , 60 kW (80 hp)

Performance

- Maximum speed: 230 km/h (143 mph, 124 kn)
