= Sauer S 2100 =

Aircraft engine

- Type: Horizontally opposed piston engine
- National origin: Germany
- Manufacturer: Sauer Flugmotorenbau GmbH
- Major applications: Motorgliders and VLA
- Developed from: Volkswagen air-cooled engine

The Sauer S 2100 is a family of four-stroke aircraft engines, certified according to JAR 22-H (CS-22 subpart H)

== Design and development ==
The engine is based on the Volkswagen air-cooled engine, extensively modified for aircraft use and all the parts are custom made. They are certified according to CS-22 subpart H and can therefore be used in motorgliders and light aircraft that are certified as CS-VLA and CS-LSA

== Variants ==
Sauer S 2100-1-AS1
Sauer S 2100-1-SS1

== Applications ==
- Scheibe SF 36

== Specifications ==
=== General characteristics ===
- Bore: 90mm
- Stroke: 84mm
- Displacement: 2136cc
- Dry weight: 64 kg

=== Components ===
- Valvetrain: Single overhead exhaust valve, single overhead inlet valve per cylinder
- Fuel system: Bing carburetor with altitude compensation
- Fuel type: min 98 RON
- Cooling system: Air-cooled

=== Performance ===
- Power output: 80hp at 3000 rpm
- Compression ratio: 8.8:1

== See also ==
- Sauer Engines
