= Groppo Trail =

Ultralight aircraft

Trail
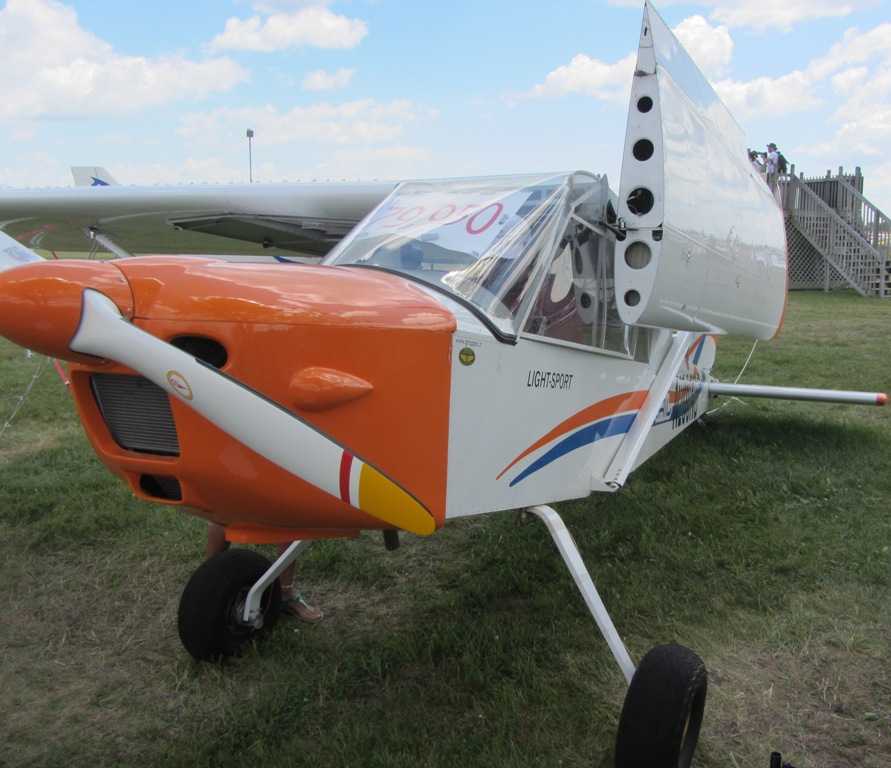
- Wing folding demonstrated

General information
- Type: Two seat ultralight
- National origin: Italy
- Manufacturer: Ing Nando Groppo srl
- Status: Both Trail and Xl in production 2011
- Number built: 50 by late 2010

History
- First flight: c.2009
- Developed from: Groppo XL

The Groppo XL and Groppo Trail are very similar single engine, tandem seat, high wing ultralight aircraft designed and built in Italy. Both can be supplied complete or in kit form. The two models differ chiefly in undercarriage type.

== Design and development ==
Apart from their undercarriage configurations, the XL (tricycle) and Trail (tailwheel) are essentially the same aircraft, with common layout, aerodynamics, dimensions and engine choices. The high wings have constant chord and blunt tips. They are braced to the lower fuselage with a single lift strut on each side. The ailerons are piano hinged, with plain flaps inboard. Fin and rudder are straight edged and swept but the cantilever horizontal surfaces are rectangular; the port elevator carries a trim tab. Both wing and tailplane can be folded back for transport, the wings rotating by 90° about their axis to lie alongside the fuselage. The wings are made from aluminium.

The flat sided fuselage is built around a welded chrome-molybdenum steel frame which is skinned with riveted metal. A composite cowling covers the flat-four engine which may be an 80 hp (60 kW) Rotax 912UL, Sauer S 2400 UL, Sauer S 2200 UL a Jabiru 2200, Westlake A80 or other engine of similar power, driving a GT two-blade propeller. The cockpit seats two in tandem under the wing, with a transparency built into the leading edge for a better upward view from the front seat. There is a wide, upward hinged, starboard side glazed door for access into both seats. There is a rear-view transparency in the fairing behind the accommodation, over the tapered fuselage.

The Trail has a fixed tailwheel undercarriage, with the mainwheels mounted onto the lower fuselage on cantilever aluminium spring legs. Ground steering is by differential hydraulic brakes. Larger wheels are an option for rough ground operation. The XL has similarly sprung mainwheels, though mounted further aft and in fairings. Its nosewheel is also faired.

The Trail is derived from the XL and made its first appearance at AERO Friedrichshafen in April 2009, though it is not known if it had then already flown.

== Operational history ==
50 Trails had been built by the end of 2010. UK marketing began that year and one aircraft was UK registered in December 2010.

== Specifications (Rotax 912 engine) ==
Data from Jane's All the World's Aircraft 2011/12

General characteristics

- Capacity: 2
- Length: 6.45 m (21 ft 2 in)
- Wingspan: 8.51 m (27 ft 11 in)
- Height: 1.82 m (6 ft 0 in)
- Wing area: 10.20 m^{2} (109.8 sq ft) gross
- Empty weight: 292.5 kg (645 lb) with ballistic parachute
- Max takeoff weight: 450 kg (992 lb)
- Fuel capacity: 70 L (18.5 US gal; 15.4 Imp gal)
- Powerplant: 1 × Rotax 912UL Flat four piston, 59.6 kW (79.9 hp)
- Propellers: 2-bladed GT, fixed pitch

Performance

- Cruise speed: 170 km/h (110 mph, 92 kn)
- Stall speed: 55 km/h (34 mph, 30 kn)
- Never exceed speed: 210 km/h (130 mph, 110 kn)
- g limits: +4/-2
- Rate of climb: 6.0 m/s (1,180 ft/min) maximum at sea level
