= AMS Flight =

AMS Flight is a manufacturer of gliders, motorgliders and ultralight aircraft. It is based in Begunje na Gorenjskem, Slovenia.

== History ==
In 1978 the first DG-100 license-built for the ELAN company (ELAN Flight), a single-seat sailplane, was built by a team of Elan employees at the German company Glaser-Dirks in Bruchsal, Germany. Long-term licensing with Glaser Dirks and later DG Flugzeugbau continued. In the then ELAN factory at Begunje glider models DG-100 Elan, DG-300 Elan, DG-500 Elan and DG-1000 were made.

The company AMS Flight d.o.o. was established in 1999 to continue the existing aircraft production and took over the entire ELAN FLIGHT division of Elan on 1 September that year.

The company's manufacturing facilities are located at Begunje, in the northwest part of Slovenia, close to the borders with Austria and Italy.

On 14 November 2001 AMS took over from Technoflug GmbH the production of the Carat motorglider. The Carat is a single-seat, powered glider with the engine in the nose. The Carat was designed in Germany for long-range cruising flights and for soaring. The Magnus, a two-seat, side-by-side version of the Carat is under development by AMS.

The AMS product range expanded with the acquisition of the Apis ULA / Sport Class motor-glider program of the Slovenian company Albastar on 30 July 2003. Manufacturing of the Apis continued in AMS until serial number 52.

In 2005/06 AMS took over the license for the German-designed sailplanes Rolladen-Schneider LS4 and LS6. These types and their planned developments replaced the manufacture of the DG-300 and DG-500, which was being run down.

In 2007 production of the Apis and Bee gliders was transferred to Pipistrel.

== Aircraft produced ==
To July 2026, Elan and AMS had built the following gliders and aircraft parts:

- DG-100 ELAN: 58 sailplanes
- DG-101 ELAN: 164 sailplanes
- DG-300 ELAN: 444 sailplanes
- DG-303 ELAN: 67 sailplanes
- DG-500 ELAN: 139 gliders
- DG-505 ELAN: 121 gliders
- DG-1000S, DG-1000T: 48 sailplanes (AMS works: fuselage lamination and complete sailplane: rough assembly, surfaces finish and final assembly)
- Carat A: 37 motor-gliders
- Apis, Bee: 40 gliders
- LS4-b: 2 sailplanes
- Composite components: wings, tailplanes, rudders: over 230 sets for Sky Arrow 450, Sky Arrow 650TC/TCN, Sinus, Virus

== Production line ==
AMS is the sole owner and manufacturer of the Carat. AMS is continuing to supply spare parts to the DG-300, DG-500 and Apis.
