= AMS-Flight Carat =

Motorglider

Carat A
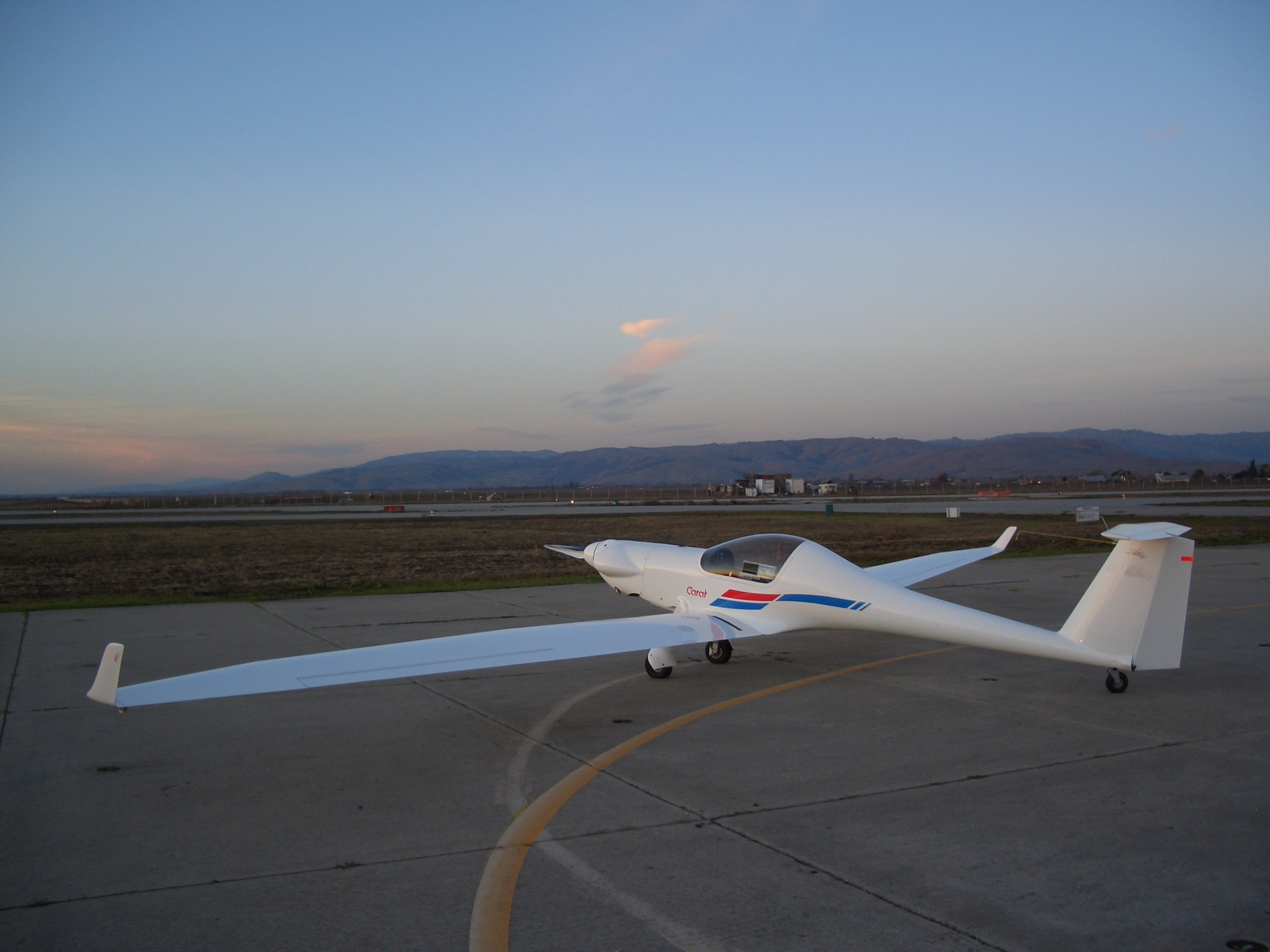

General information
- Type: High performance motorglider
- National origin: Germany
- Manufacturer: AMS-Flight, Ljubljana
- Number built: 31 by September 2009

History
- First flight: 16 December 1997

The AMS-Flight Carat A is a single-seat, high performance motorglider. The sailplane was originally designed and built by Technoflug in Germany and is now manufactured by AMS-Flight in Slovenia.

== Design and development ==
The Carat was designed by Technoflug around the wings and horizontal tail of the Schempp-Hirth Discus sailplane, marrying these to a new fuselage, fin, undercarriage and engine.. Structurally the aircraft is a mixture of fibreglass and carbon fibre composites. The wings have PVC foam cores. In plan the wings have parallel chord inner panels and two outer sections of increasing straight taper. Winglets are an option. Schempp-Hirth type airbrakes are mounted on the upper surfaces of the inner panels, with turbulators on the underside to ensure a controlled boundary layer transition from laminar to turbulent flow without separation. The wings have 3° of dihedral.

Though the Discus and the Carat share wings, they position them differently: the Discus is a mid-wing aircraft, the Carat a low-wing one. Like the Discus, the Carat has a high T-tail with separate tailplane and elevators. The tailplane, like the wings, is detachable for easy transport. The cockpit, enclosed in a large clear single piece canopy, is at the trailing edge of the wing, with the main spar under the pilot's knees. The Carat has a conventional electrically-operated inwardly retractable undercarriage. The main wheels have hydraulically operated disc brakes and there is a parking brake. The non-retractable tailwheel is steerable.

The Carat is powered by an air-cooled, four cylinder, Volkswagen derived, 40 kW (54 hp) Sauer S1800 piston engine. This drives the unique feature of the Carat, its folding two blade propeller: the blades fold forward like spears to minimize drag when the engine is off. This is in contrast to other motorgliders which mostly either store the propeller inside the fuselage, or merely feather the propeller blades. The Carat's propeller is opened by the centrifugal force on the turning blades, working against a folding force provided by a gas damping spring mechanism. This folding mechanism has the advantage of simplicity, but it means that the engine can not be windmill-started if the battery is flat. Because of the forward pointing blades when the engine is off, the Carat cannot be towed aloft like traditional sailplanes.

The first flight was made on 16 December 1997 and the first production model displayed at Aero '99 at Friedrichshafen in April 1999 as the Technoflug TFK-2 Carat. Certification was achieved in 2003, by which time marketing had been passed to AMS.

== Operational history ==
Six production aircraft had been built by the end of 2003 and thirty one by September 2009. The majority of these were flying in the United States, the rest mostly in Western Europe.

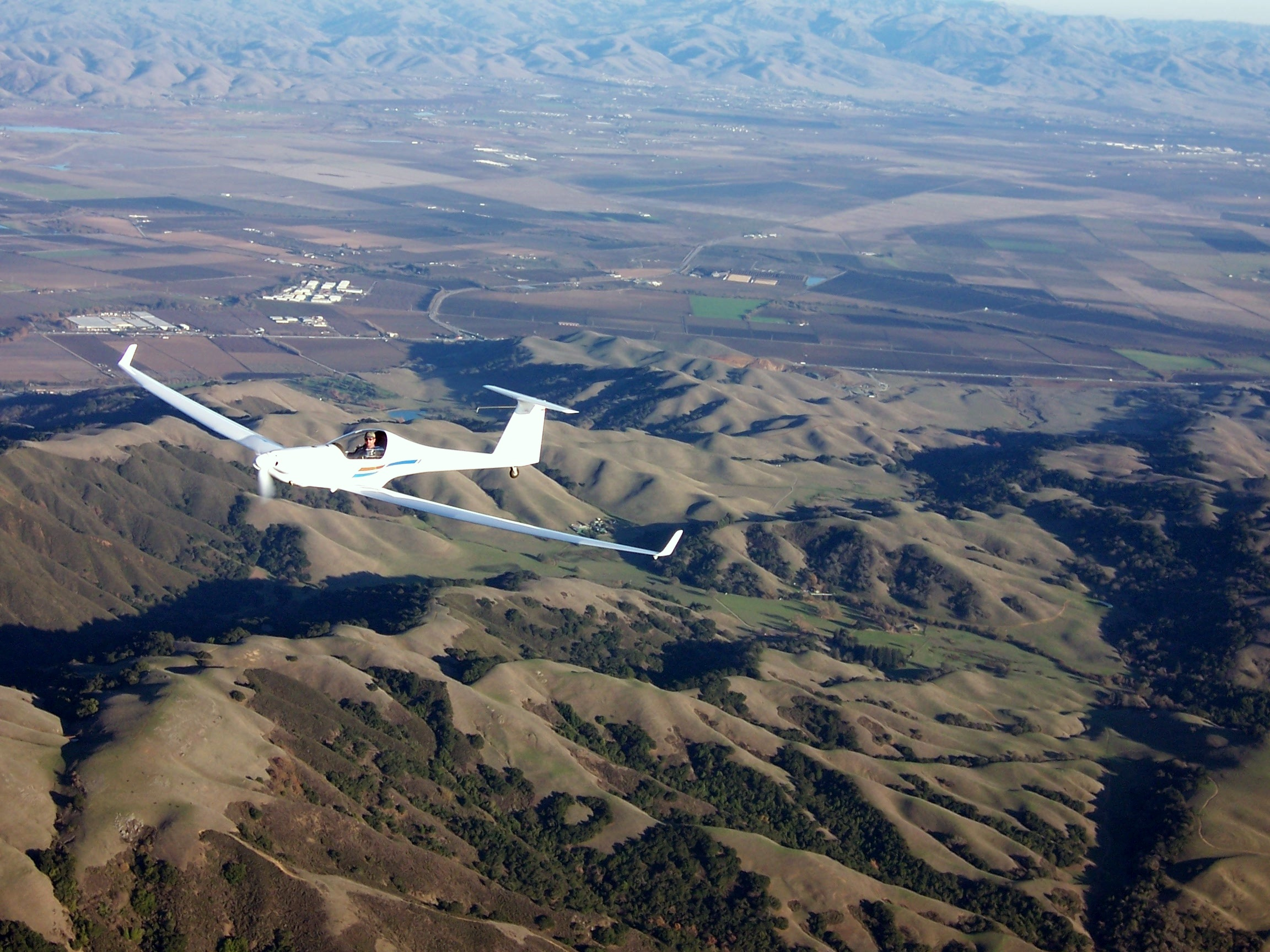
Carat in flight

== Specifications ==
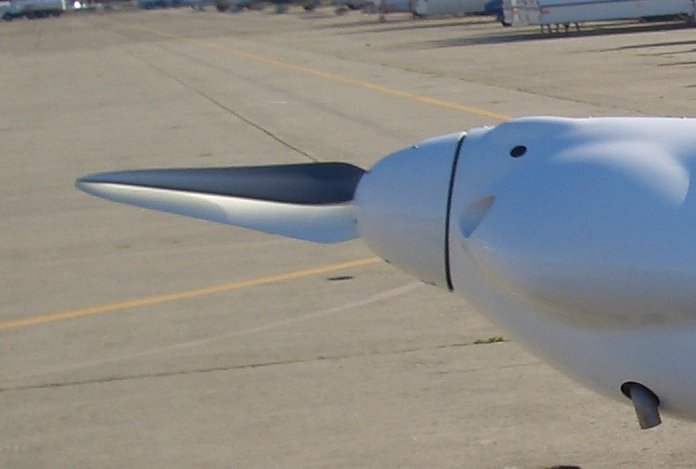
Detail of the Carat's propeller with the engine off

Data from Jane's All the World's Aircraft 2011/12

General characteristics

- Crew: 1
- Length: 6.21 m (20 ft 4 in)
- Wingspan: 15.00 m (49 ft 3 in)
- Wing area: 10.58 m^{2} (113.9 sq ft) gross
- Aspect ratio: 21.3
- Empty weight: 341 kg (752 lb)
- Max takeoff weight: 490 kg (1,080 lb)
- Fuel capacity: 52 L (13.7 US gal, 11.4 Imp gal) usable
- Powerplant: 1 × Sauer 1800-1-ES1C 1754cc (109.8 cu in), 4-cylinder 4-stroke, air-cooled Max power: 44kW (60 HP) at 3000 rpm, Max continuous power: 40kW (54 HP)
- Propellers: 2-bladed AMS AM KS-F3-1A/140-1 fixed pitch. With engine off, blades fold forward, held by gas damping springs, 1.40 m (4 ft 7 in) diameter

Performance

- Cruise speed: 214 km/h (133 mph, 116 kn) normal at 75% power
- Stall speed: 77 km/h (48 mph, 42 kn) powered. 80 km/h (50 mph, 44 kn) unpowered.
- Never exceed speed: 250 km/h (160 mph, 130 kn)
- Range: 1,026 km (638 mi, 554 nmi) maximum fuel, 30 min reserves
- g limits: +5.3/-2.65
- Maximum glide ratio: 35:1
- Rate of climb: 2.9 m/s (570 ft/min) maximum continuous power
- Rate of sink: 0.75 m/s (148 ft/min) minimum
