= Sauer S 2400 UL =

Sauer S 2400UL
- Type: Horizontally opposed piston engine
- National origin: Germany
- Manufacturer: Sauer Flugmotorenbau GmbH
- Major applications: Ultralights and Experimental Aircraft
- Developed from: Volkswagen air-cooled engine or the Volkswagen Wasserboxer engine

The Sauer S 2400 UL is a 4 stroke aircraft engine for homebuilt and ultralight aircraft.

== Design and development ==
The engine is based on the Volkswagen air-cooled engine or the Volkswagen Wasserboxer engine. It is extensively modified for aircraft use and all the parts are custom made. The engine is derived from the certified engines produced by the same manufacturer and used in several motorgliders and small aircraft. The engine can be delivered with aluminium or magnesium casing (Wasserboxer-casing or the casing from the beetle engine), where the aluminium casing weighs 7 kg more.

== Applications ==
- Groppo Trial

== Specifications (variant) ==
=== General characteristics ===
- Bore: 94mm
- Stroke: 84mm
- Displacement: 2332cc
- Dry weight: 68 or 75 kg depending on casing

=== Components ===
- Valvetrain: Single overhead exhaust valve, single overhead inlet valve per cylinder
- Fuel system: Bing carburetor with altitude compensation
- Fuel type: min 95/98 RON
- Cooling system: Air-cooled

=== Performance ===
- Power output: 100hp at 3500 rpm
- Compression ratio: 7.9:1

== See also ==
- Sauer engines
