= Sauer S 2100 ULT =

- Type: Horizontally opposed piston aircraft engine
- National origin: Germany
- Manufacturer: Sauer Flugmotorenbau GmbH
- Major applications: Ultralights and homebuilt aircraft
- Developed from: Volkswagen Wasserboxer engine

The Sauer S 2100 ULT is a turbocharged four-stroke aircraft engine for homebuilt and ultralight aircraft.

== Design and development ==
The engine is based on the Volkswagen Wasserboxer engine. It is extensively modified for aircraft use and all the parts are custom made. The engine is derived from the certified engines produced by the same manufacturer and used in several motorgliders and light aircraft.

== Operational history ==
At least one Asso X is reported to be using this engine.

== Applications ==
- Asso X Jewel

== Specifications (variant) ==
=== General characteristics ===
- Bore: 90.5mm
- Stroke: 84mm
- Displacement: 2161cc
- Dry weight: 76 kg

=== Components ===
- Valvetrain: Single overhead exhaust valve, single overhead inlet valve per cylinder
- Turbocharger: Low Boost
- Fuel system: Bing carburetor with altitude compensation
- Fuel type: min 98 RON
- Cooling system: Air-cooled

=== Performance ===
- Power output: 110hp at 3000 rpm
- Compression ratio: 6.5:1

== See also ==
- Sauer Engines
