= Sauer S 2200 UL =

German aircraft engine

- Type: Horizontally opposed piston engine
- National origin: Germany
- Manufacturer: Sauer Flugmotorenbau GmbH
- Major applications: Ultralights and Experimental Aircraft
- Developed from: Volkswagen air-cooled engine

The Sauer S 2200 UL is a 4 stroke aircraft engine designed for homebuilt and ultralight aircraft.

== Design and development ==
The engine is based on the Volkswagen air-cooled engine. It is extensively modified for aircraft use and all the parts are custom made. The engine is derived from the certified engines produced by the same manufacturer and used in several motorgliders and light aircraft.

== Applications ==
- Groppo Trial
- Rans S-6 Coyote II

== Specifications (variant) ==
=== General characteristics ===
- Bore: 92mm
- Stroke: 84mm
- Displacement: 2234cc
- Dry weight: 66 kg

=== Components ===
- Valvetrain: Single overhead exhaust valve, single overhead inlet valve per cylinder
- Fuel system: Bing carburetor with altitude compensation
- Fuel type: min 98 RON
- Cooling system: Air-cooled

=== Performance ===
- Power output: 85hp at 3000 rpm
- Compression ratio: 8.8:1
