= Volkswagen Wasserboxer engine =

German automotive engine

Volkswagen wasserboxer
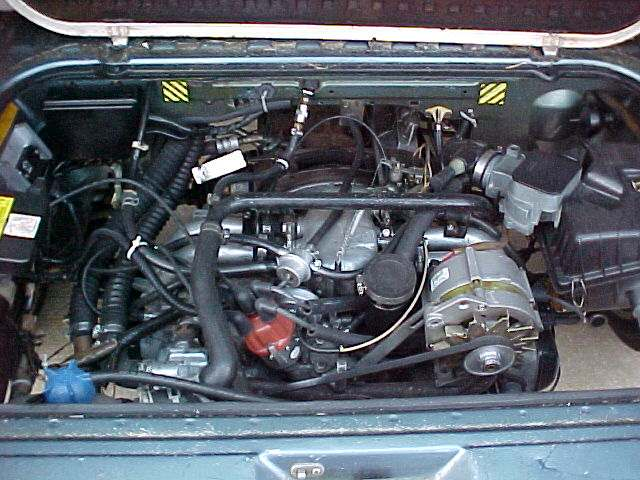

Overview
- Manufacturer: Volkswagen Group
- Production: August 1982 – July 1992

Layout
- Configuration: flat-4 petrol engine
- Displacement: 1,914 cc (116.8 cu in), 2,109 cc (128.7 cu in)
- Cylinder bore: 94 mm (3.70 in)
- Piston stroke: 69 mm (2.72 in); 76 mm (2.99 in)
- Cylinder block material: Cast aluminium alloy
- Cylinder head material: Cast aluminium alloy
- Valvetrain: Pushrod OHV, 2 valves/cyl.

Combustion
- Fuel system: Carburettor; Electronic fuel injection
- Fuel type: Petrol
- Oil system: Wet sump
- Cooling system: Water-cooled

Chronology
- Predecessor: Volkswagen air-cooled engine

The Volkswagen wasserboxer is an overhead-valve (OHV), flat four-cylinder boxer petrol engine developed by Volkswagen. "Wasserboxer", abbreviated as WBX, is a German compound noun where "wasser" indicates that the engine is water-cooled, and "boxer" describes the arrangement and movement of the pistons.

== Details ==
The wasserboxer features a cast aluminium alloy cylinder block, cylinder heads, and pistons; and a die-forged steel flat plane crankshaft with four main bearings.

As in Volkswagen's earlier air-cooled luftboxer engines, the wasserboxer's three-bearing camshaft is driven directly from the crankshaft by means of a small steel gear on the crankshaft and a larger aluminium gear on the camshaft, with the whole mechanism internal to the engine. The overhead poppet valves each feature two concentric valve springs, and are operated by pushrods and rocker arms, which are adjustable to facilitate setting valve clearances.

The wasserboxer also features a "Heron cylinder head" with "bowl-in-piston" type combustion chambers, in which combustion takes place within the piston area rather than a recess machined into the cylinder head.

The cylinder banks consist of cast iron cylinder liners inserted into the crankcase surrounded by a water jacket, with a "rubber lip" style water jacket seal. The tops of the cylinder liners are pressed into recessed cut-outs in the cylinder heads and sealed with compressible metal rings to prevent leakage.

The wasserboxer was available in two displacements — 1.9-litres and 2.1-litres. Both engines have the same cylinder bore, but the 2.1-litre has a longer stroke.

Some wasserboxers suffered from water jacket gasket failures, often erroneously referred to as head gaskets. Some design decisions, such as poorly placed sensors and a cooling system prone to leaks, may have made the engines more likely to experience this type of failure. Other possible explanations have focused on corrosion in the cooling system, and the use of phosphated coolant.

The switch to water-cooling for the boxer engines was made mid-1982, because Volkswagen could no longer make the air-cooled engines meet emissions standards.

The wasserboxer engine was only used in the Volkswagen Type 2 (T3). The previous generation Volkswagen Type 2 T2 was produced in Brazil until 2013, and changed to water-cooled Audi-sourced inline four engines on 23 December 2005 in response to Brazil's emission laws.

== Variants ==
All data from ETKA and Owner's Manuals.

| Engine ID code | Compr. ratio | DIN-rated maximum power | Fuel system | Years | Notes |
|---|---|---|---|---|---|
1.9-litre engines — 1,914 cc (116.8 cu in)
| DF | 8.6:1 | 44 kW (60 PS; 59 bhp) | 34 PICT-5 carburetor | 08/82–07/92 | |
| DG | 8.6:1 | 57 kW (77 PS; 76 bhp) | 2E3 or 2E4 carburetor | 08/82–07/92 | |
| DH | | 60 kW (82 PS; 80 bhp) | Digijet (Digital-Jetronic) fuel injection, vane-type air flow meter | 01/83–07/85 | |
| EY | 7.5:1 | 41 kW (56 PS; 55 bhp) | 34 PICT-5 carburetor | | |
| GW | 8.6:1 | 66 kW (90 PS; 89 bhp) | Digijet (Digital-Jetronic) fuel injection, vane-type air flow meter | 08/83–07/85 | |
| SP | | 54 kW (73 PS; 72 bhp) | 2E3 or 2E4 carburetor | 08/86–07/89 | Switzerland only |
2.1-litre engines — 2,109 cc (128.7 cu in)
| DJ | 10:1 | 82 kW (111 PS; 110 bhp) | Digijet (Digital-Jetronic) fuel injection, vane-type air flow meter | 08/84–07/92 | Sold in European countries not requiring catalytic converter |
| MV | 9:1 | 70 kW (95 PS; 94 bhp) | Digifant fuel injection, vane-type air flow meter | 08/85–07/92 | 90 bhp in USA and Canada; also used until the end of Vanagon importation into the USA and Canada in 1991 |
| SR | | 64 kW (87 PS; 86 bhp) | Digifant fuel injection, vane-type air flow meter | 08/86–07/92 | Switzerland only |
| SS | 9:1 | 68 kW (92 PS; 91 bhp) | Digifant fuel injection, vane-type air flow meter | 08/89–07/92 | |

== Oettinger WBX 6 engine ==
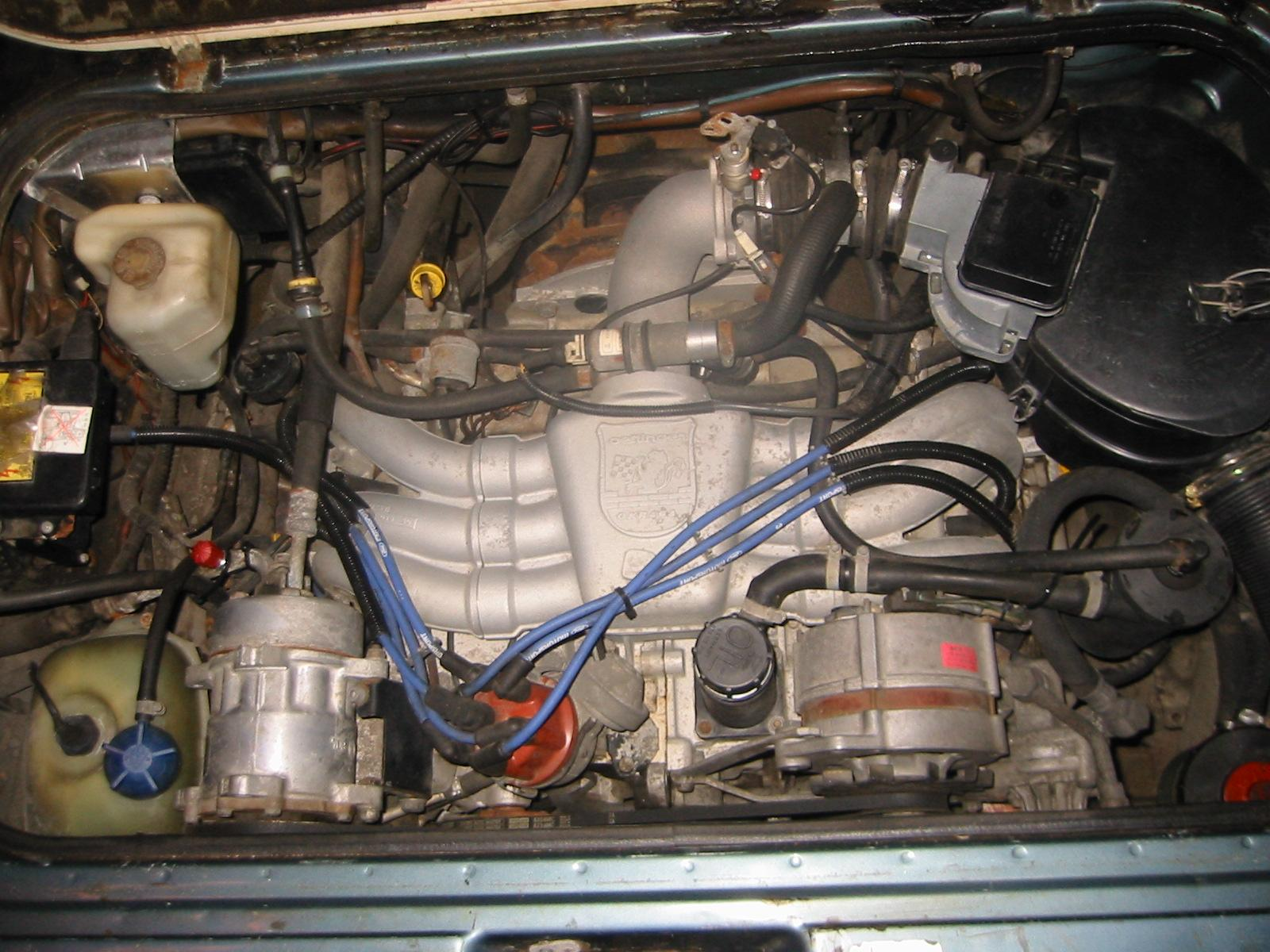
Oettinger WBX 6 engine

Volkswagen contracted Oettinger to develop a six-cylinder version of the wasserboxer. Although Volkswagen decided not to use it, Oettinger sold a T3 equipped with this engine.

== See also ==
- List of discontinued Volkswagen Group petrol engines
