= Adept 320T =

Liquid-cooled V-6 engine for aviation use

320T
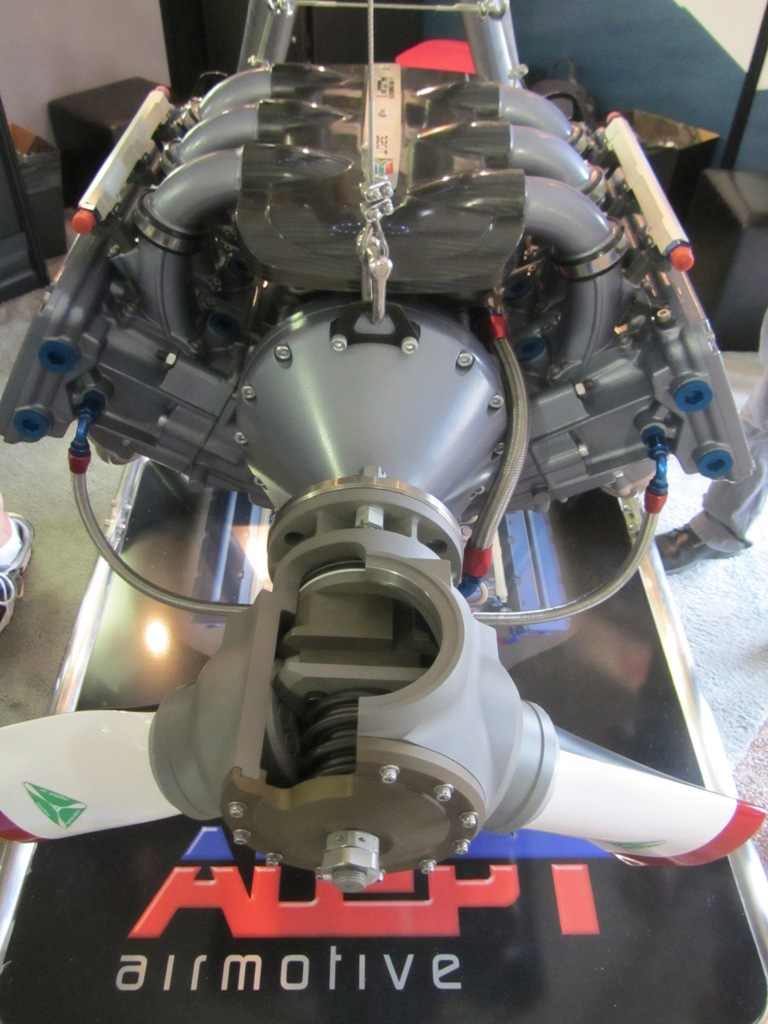
- Type: Aircraft engine
- National origin: South Africa
- Manufacturer: Adept Airmotive

The Adept Airmotive 320T is a liquid-cooled V-6 engine for aviation use.

== Specifications (320T) ==
Data from manufacturer.

=== General characteristics ===
- Type: 120° V-6 four-stroke, liquid-cooled piston aircraft engine
- Bore: 98 mm
- Stroke: 70 mm
- Displacement: 3.2 liters
- Length: 720 mm (28.3 in)
- Width: 730 mm (28.7 in)
- Height: 560 mm (22 in)
- Dry weight: 340 lb.

=== Components ===
- Valvetrain: 24 Valve Quad Cam
- Turbocharger: yes
- Fuel type: Avgas / Mogas / E15
- Oil system: Dry Sump
- Cooling system: Liquid

=== Performance ===
- Power output: 320 hp at 5,500 rpm

== See also ==
Related lists

- List of aircraft engines
