= Allen O-675 =

O-675
- Type: Eight-cylinder horizontally opposed
- National origin: USA
- Manufacturer: Allen Aircraft Corporation
- First run: 1927
- Manufactured: 1928

The Allen Aircraft Engine Co. of Compton, a suburb of Los Angeles California, developed an eight-cylinder horizontally opposed aircraft engine during 1928–1929.

Little is known about this engine, other than that it was never given a Type Certificate and that it was not used on any known aircraft.

== Specifications (O-675) ==
Data from Aeroengines

=== General characteristics ===
- Type: 8-cylinder horizontally opposed
- Bore: 4.75 in
- Stroke: 4.75 in
- Displacement: 673.4 ci
- Dry weight: 575 lb

=== Components ===
- Cooling system: air-cooled
- Ignition system: dual ignition

=== Performance ===
- Power output: 200 hp@1800 rpm
