= Chrysler T36D =

Turboprop engine

T36D
- Type: Turboprop
- National origin: United States
- Manufacturer: Chrysler Engineering Corp.
- Number built: 0

The Chrysler Engineering Corp. T36D turboprop engine, design-rated at 2,500 lb thrust, was ordered by the United States Navy in 1948, but was deemed unnecessary as the aircraft it was to power was canceled. The engine development was stopped, and the program was canceled before any engines were built.

== Specifications (T36D) ==
Data from Fahey

==== General characteristics ====
- Type: Turboprop
- Length:
- Diameter:
- Dry weight:

==== Components ====
- Compressor: Axial

==== Performance ====
- Maximum thrust: 2,500 lb
