= Fisher Boomerang =

American ultralight aircraft

General information
- Type: Ultralight aircraft
- National origin: United States
- Manufacturer: Fisher Flying Products
- Designer: Michael E. Fisher
- Status: Production completed

History
- Introduction date: mid-1982

The Fisher Boomerang is a single-seat conventional landing gear, high-winged monoplane ultralight aircraft designed by Michael Fisher and introduced in mid-1982.

== Development ==
The Boomerang was intended to meet the requirements of the US FAR 103 Ultralight Vehicles category, including that category's maximum 254 lb (115 kg) empty weight. The aircraft has a standard empty weight of 190 lb (86 kg).

The aircraft is a single-seat ultralight with a high wing and a conventional three-axis type with ailerons, elevators and rudder. The airframe structure is of 6061T6 and 2024T3 aluminum tube, covered with Stits Polyfibre aircraft fabric. The landing gear is of a fixed taildragger configuration without suspension on the 20 in (51 cm) main wheels. Wings were available in several spans, from 28 to 32 ft (8.5 to 9.8 m), the longer span being used for the two seat variant.

The Boomerang is fitted with a 30 hp (22 kW) Kawasaki 340 engine as standard equipment or optionally a 40 hp (30 kW) Kawasaki 440A engine, both with a reduction drive system. The aircraft has an empty weight of 190 lb (86 kg) and a gross weight of 470 lb (213 kg), giving a useful load of 280 lb (127 kg).

The aircraft was discontinued due to poor sales.

== Specifications (Boomerang) ==
Data from Janes All the Worlds Aircraft 1983-84

General characteristics

- Crew: one
- Capacity: no passengers
- Wingspan: 28 ft 0 in (8.53 m)
- Wing area: 156 sq ft (14.5 m^{2})
- Aspect ratio: 5.03:1
- Empty weight: 190 lb (86 kg)
- Gross weight: 470 lb (213 kg)
- Fuel capacity: 2.5 US gallons (9.5 L) standard, 5 US Gallons (19 L) optional
- Powerplant: 1 × Kawasaki 440A two-stroke engine, 40 hp (30 kW)
- Propellers: 2-bladed, 4.5 ft (1.4 m) diameter

== See also ==
Aircraft of comparable role, configuration, and era

- Beaujon Enduro
- Beaujon Mach .07
- Eipper Quicksilver
- Fisher Barnstormer
- Fisher Flyer
- Jean St-Germain Raz-Mut
