= Fisher Youngster =

Canadian biplane kit aircraft

Youngster

General information
- Type: Kit aircraft
- National origin: Canada
- Manufacturer: Fisher Flying Products
- Number built: 20 (2011)

History
- Introduction date: 1994
- First flight: 1994

The Fisher Youngster is a Canadian single-seat, conventional landing gear, single-engined, biplane kit aircraft designed for construction by amateur builders. The aircraft was inspired by the German Bücker Bü 133 Jungmeister aerobatic aircraft of the 1930s.

Fisher Flying Products was originally based in Edgeley, North Dakota, USA but the company is now located in Vaughan, Ontario, Canada.

== Development ==
The Youngster was designed by Fisher Aircraft in the United States in 1994 and was intended to comply with the US Experimental - Amateur-built category, although it qualifies as an ultralight aircraft in some countries, such as Canada. It also qualifies as a US Experimental Light Sport Aircraft. The Youngster's standard empty weight is 400 lb (181 kg) when equipped with a 50 hp (37 kW) Rotax 503 engine and it has a gross weight of 650 lb (295 kg).

The aircraft is stressed for +6 and -3.75 g and is suitable for sportsman category aerobatics.

The construction of the Youngster is of wood with the fuselage built in a Warren Truss covered with a 1/8 in (3 mm) birch plywood skin. The fuselage employs longitudinal stringers to replicate the Jungmeister's shape. The wings and tail are covered with doped aircraft fabric. The wings feature interplane struts, cabane struts, bottom wing ailerons only and a NACA 2315 airfoil. Like the original Jungmeister upon which it is based, the Youngster has no flaps. The Youngster's main landing gear has bungee suspension. The cockpit can be left open or covered with an optional canopy for cold weather operations. The company claims an amateur builder can complete the aircraft from the kit in 500 hours.

The specified engines for the Youngster include the 50 hp (37 kW) Rotax 503 two-stroke and the Great Plains Aircraft 65 hp (48 kW) four-stroke Volkswagen air-cooled engine. Subaru auto conversions of up to 85 hp (63 kW) and 160 lb (73 kg) can also be used.

By late 2004 20 Youngsters were flying.

== Variants ==
Youngster
Original Rotax-powered design
Youngster V
Great Plains Volkswagen air-cooled engine 65 hp (48 kW) powered version

== Specifications ==
Data from Company website, AeroCrafter & Kitplanes

General characteristics

- Crew: one
- Capacity: 250 lb (113 kg) useful load, no passengers
- Length: 15 ft 6 in (4.73 m)
- Wingspan: 18 ft 0 in (5.49 m)
- Height: 6 ft 1 in (1.86 m)
- Wing area: 126 sq ft (11.72 m^{2})
- Airfoil: NACA 2315
- Empty weight: 400 lb (181 kg)
- Max takeoff weight: 650 lb (295 kg)
- Powerplant: 1 × Rotax 503 two stroke, two cylinder aircraft engine, 50 hp (37 kW)

Performance

- Cruise speed: 80 mph (130 km/h, 70 kn)
- Stall speed: 32 mph (52 km/h, 28 kn)
- Never exceed speed: 110 mph (178 km/h, 96 kn)
- Rate of climb: 800 ft/min (4.1 m/s)
- Wing loading: 5.2 lb/sq ft (26.9 kg/m^{2})
- Power/mass: 13.0 lb/hp (0.125 kW/kg)

== See also ==
Aircraft of comparable role, configuration, and era

- Fisher Celebrity
- Fisher FP-404
- Fisher R-80 Tiger Moth
- Murphy Renegade
