= Fisher Classic =

Canadian homebuilt light aircraft

Classic
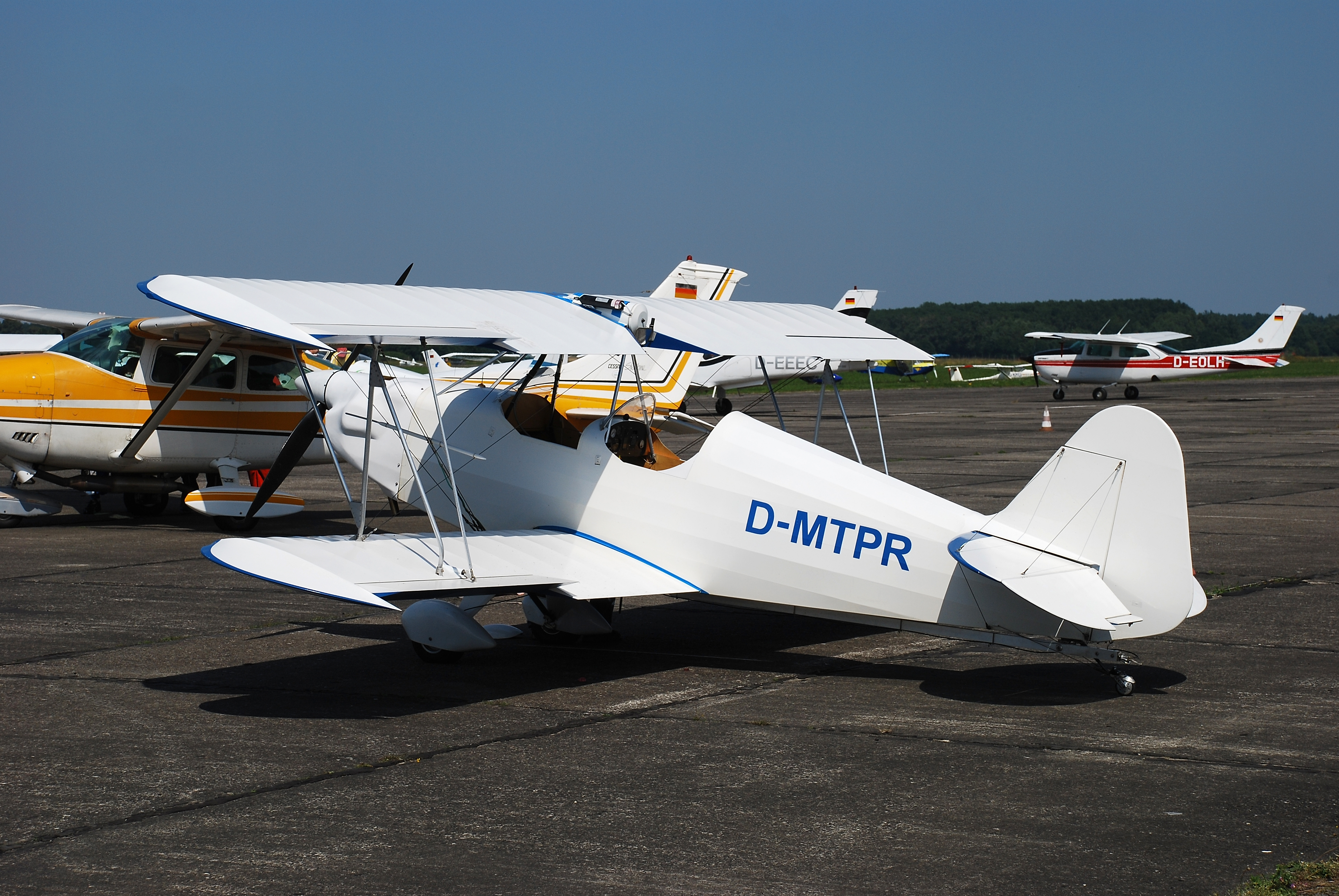
- A Fisher Classic, equipped with a Rotax 914 power plant

General information
- Type: Kit aircraft
- National origin: Canada
- Manufacturer: Fisher Flying Products
- Number built: 155 (2011)

History
- Introduction date: 1987
- First flight: 1987

The Fisher Classic is a Canadian two-seat, conventional landing gear, single-engined, biplane kit aircraft designed for construction by amateur builders. The aircraft is a two-seat derivation of the Fisher FP-404. Fisher Flying Products was originally based in Edgeley, North Dakota, USA but the company is now located in Woodbridge, Ontario, Canada.

== Design and development ==
The Classic was designed by Fisher Aircraft in the United States in 1987 and was intended to comply with the US Experimental - Amateur-built category, although it qualifies as an ultralight aircraft in some countries, such as Canada. It also qualifies as a US Experimental Light Sport Aircraft. The Classic's standard empty weight is 400 lb (181 kg) when equipped with a 64 hp (48 kW) Rotax 582 engine and it has a gross weight of 850 lb (386 kg).

The construction of the Classic is of wood, with the wings, tail and fuselage covered with doped aircraft fabric. The aircraft features interplane struts, inverted "V" cabane struts, four ailerons and a semi-symmetrical airfoil. Like the original FP-404 upon which it is based, the Classic has no flaps. The Classic's main landing gear is bungee suspended. Cockpit access is via the lower wing. The company claims an amateur builder can complete the aircraft from the kit in 500 hours.

The specified engine for the Classic is the 64 hp (48 kW) Rotax 582 two-stroke engine.

The estimated time to build the aircraft from the kit is 400–500 hours, or 250 hours from the quick-build kit. By late 2011 more than 155 Classics were flying.

== Specifications Classic) ==
Data from Company website, AeroCrafter & Kitplanes

General characteristics

- Crew: one
- Capacity: one passenger and 450 lb (204 kg) useful load
- Length: 16 ft 9 in (5.11 m)
- Wingspan: 22 ft 0 in (6.71 m)
- Height: 5 ft 11 in (1.80 m)
- Wing area: 154 sq ft (14.32 m^{2})
- Empty weight: 400 lb (181 kg)
- Max takeoff weight: 850 lb (385 kg)
- Powerplant: 1 × Rotax 582 Two stroke, two cylinder aircraft engine, 64 hp (48 kW)

Performance

- Maximum speed: 90 mph (146 km/h, 78 kn)
- Cruise speed: 80 mph (130 km/h, 70 kn)
- Stall speed: 39 mph (63 km/h, 34 kn)
- Never exceed speed: 100 mph (162 km/h, 87 kn)
- Rate of climb: 600 ft/min (3.1 m/s)
- Wing loading: 5.2 lb/sq ft (26.9 kg/m^{2})
- Power/mass: 13.3 lb/hp (0.125 kW/kg)

== See also ==
Aircraft of comparable role, configuration, and era

- Fisher Celebrity
- Fisher FP-404
- Fisher R-80 Tiger Moth
- Murphy Renegade
- Sorrell Hiperlight
