= Fisher Koala =

Fisher Koala may refer to:

- Fisher FP-202 Koala, a Canadian ultralight aircraft design
- Fisher Super Koala, a Canadian ultralight aircraft design
