= Fisher Barnstormer =

American ultralight aircraft

General information
- Type: Ultralight aircraft
- National origin: United States
- Manufacturer: Fisher Flying Products
- Designer: Michael E. Fisher
- Status: Production completed

History
- Introduction date: mid-1982

The Fisher Barnstormer is a single-seat tricycle landing gear, reverse-staggered biplane ultralight aircraft designed by Michael Fisher and introduced in mid-1982.

== Development ==
The Barnstormer was intended to meet the requirements of the US FAR 103 Ultralight Vehicles category, including that category's maximum 254 lb (115 kg) empty weight.

The aircraft is a single-seat ultralight with an unusual reverse-stagger on its biplane wings, the top wing being behind the bottom wing. The airfoil used is a NACA 2305 section. The control system is a conventional three-axis type with ailerons, elevators and rudder. The airframe structure is of 6061T6 and 2024T3 aluminum tube, covered with Stits Polyfibre aircraft fabric. The landing gear is of a fixed tricycle configuration with bungee-suspension, 16 in (41 cm) main wheels and brakes.

The Barnstormer is fitted with a 40 hp (30 kW) Kawasaki 440A engine with a reduction drive system. The aircraft has an empty weight of 220 lb (100 kg) and a gross weight of 490 lb (222 kg), giving a useful load of 270 lb (122 kg).

The aircraft was not successful commercially and was quickly replaced in the Fisher line by newer designs. Reviewer Andre Cliche stated "This ultralight is handicapped by its awkward and cluttered appearance."

== Specifications (Barnstormer) ==
Data from Janes All the Worlds Aircraft 1983-84 and Cliche

General characteristics

- Crew: one
- Capacity: no passengers
- Wingspan: 20 ft 0 in (6.10 m)
- Wing area: 176 sq ft (16.4 m^{2})
- Aspect ratio: 4.54:1
- Airfoil: NACA 23015
- Empty weight: 220 lb (100 kg)
- Gross weight: 490 lb (222 kg)
- Fuel capacity: 5 US Gallons (19 L)
- Powerplant: 1 × Kawasaki 440A two-stroke engine, 40 hp (30 kW)
- Propellers: 2-bladed, 4.83 ft (1.47 m) diameter

== See also ==
Aircraft of comparable role, configuration, and era

- Fisher 404
- Fisher Flyer
- Jean St-Germain Raz-Mut
- Murphy Renegade
