= Barnstormer =

Barnstormer, Barnstorm or Barnstorming may refer to:

== Sports ==
- Barnstorming, aerial stunts performed for entertainment, popular in the 1920s
- Barnstorming (sports), athletic practice of traveling and playing exhibition matches outside of established leagues
- Iowa Barnstormers, a professional indoor football team from Des Moines, Iowa, U.S.
- Lancaster Barnstormers, a professional baseball team from Lancaster, Pennsylvania, U.S.
- Chatham-Kent Barnstormers

== Arts and entertainment ==
=== Bands ===
- Barnstorm (band), an American rock band 1972–1974
- Barnstormer (band), a music project of Attila the Stockbroker

=== Groups ===
- Barnstorm (company), an American film and television production company founded by Glen Powell
- The Barnstormers Theatre, in Tamworth, New Hampshire, notable as the oldest ongoing professional summer theatre in the U.S.

=== Works ===
- Barnstorm (album), 1972
- The Barnstormer (film), a 1922 American silent comedy film
- Barnstorming (video game), released in 1982 for the Atari 2600

=== Other uses ===
- Barnstormer (ride), a thrill ride at Dollywood in Pigeon Forge, Tennessee, U.S.
- The Barnstormer, a junior roller coaster at Walt Disney World in Florida, U.S.
- "Barnstormers", an episode of The Shield TV series

== Other uses ==
- Fisher Barnstormer, a biplane ultralight aircraft
- Operation Barnstormer, a 2006 coalition military operation of the Iraq War
- Ashley and Shane Barnstormer, characters from the 2014 web series Video Game High School
