= Fisher FP-101 =

American ultralight airplane

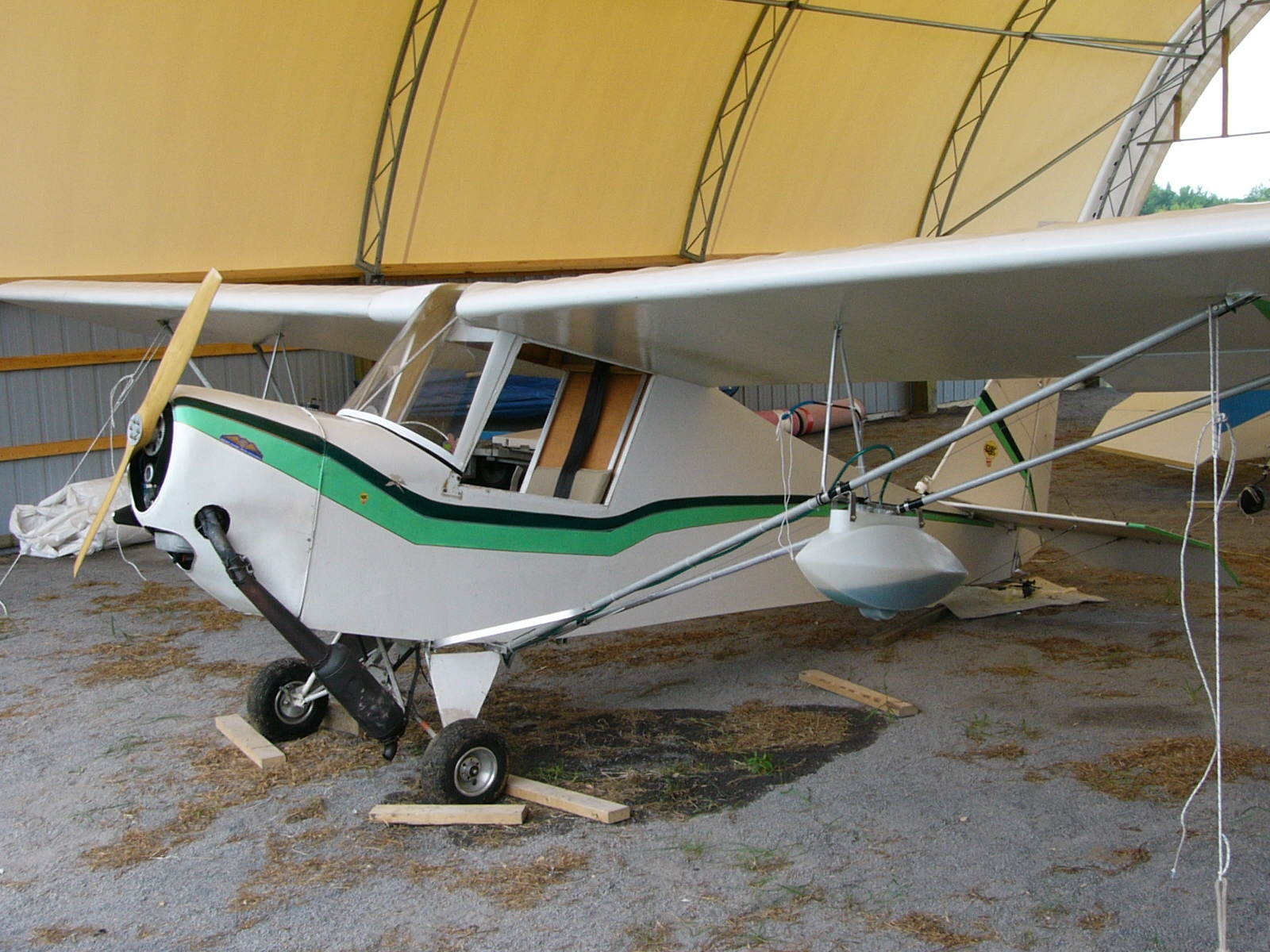

General information
- Type: Kit aircraft
- National origin: United States
- Manufacturer: Lite Flite; Fisher Flying Products
- Designer: Michael Fisher
- Status: Kit production completed

History
- First flight: mid-1982

The Fisher FP-101 is an American single-seat, high-wing, conventional landing gear, tractor configuration single engine ultralight aircraft that was available in kit form from Lite Flite of South Webster, Ohio and later Fisher Flying Products of Edgeley, North Dakota.

== Development ==
The FP-101 was designed by Michael Fisher of Lite Flite and first flown in the middle of 1982. It was intended to meet the requirements of the US FAR 103 Ultralight Vehicles category, including that category's maximum 254 lb (115 kg) empty weight. The company name was later changed to Fisher Flying Products and production continued under that company name until the FP-101 was supplanted in production by the Fisher FP-202 Koala.

The aircraft is of predominantly wooden construction, with a wooden geodesic (called "geodetic" in many '80s sport-aviation magazines, likely in error) fuselage and wood framed wings and tail surfaces all covered in doped aircraft fabric. The high wing is supported by aluminum "V" struts with jury struts. The control system is standard three-axis type including ailerons, elevators and tail-mounted rudder. The conventional configuration fixed main landing gear is made from steel tube with bungee suspension, while the tail wheel is steerable. The engine cowling is built from fiberglass. Pilot access to the cockpit is via a fold-down door on the right-hand side of the fuselage. The windshield is fashioned from Lexan and side windows are optional.

The standard powerplant when the aircraft was introduced was the 28 hp (21 kW) Rotax 277 single cylinder, two-stroke powerplant driving a two-bladed wooden propeller. Recoil start was standard, with electric start as optional.

The standard empty weight for the FP-101 was 247 lb (112 kg) and the gross weight 500 lb (227 kg), giving a 253 lb (115 kg) useful load.

== Operational history ==
The majority of FP-101s were delivered to customers in the United States where they are flown as unregistered ultralights. In October 2009 eight were registered in the US as Experimental - Amateur-builts and eleven were registered in Canada as basic ultra-light aeroplanes.

== Specifications (FP-101) ==
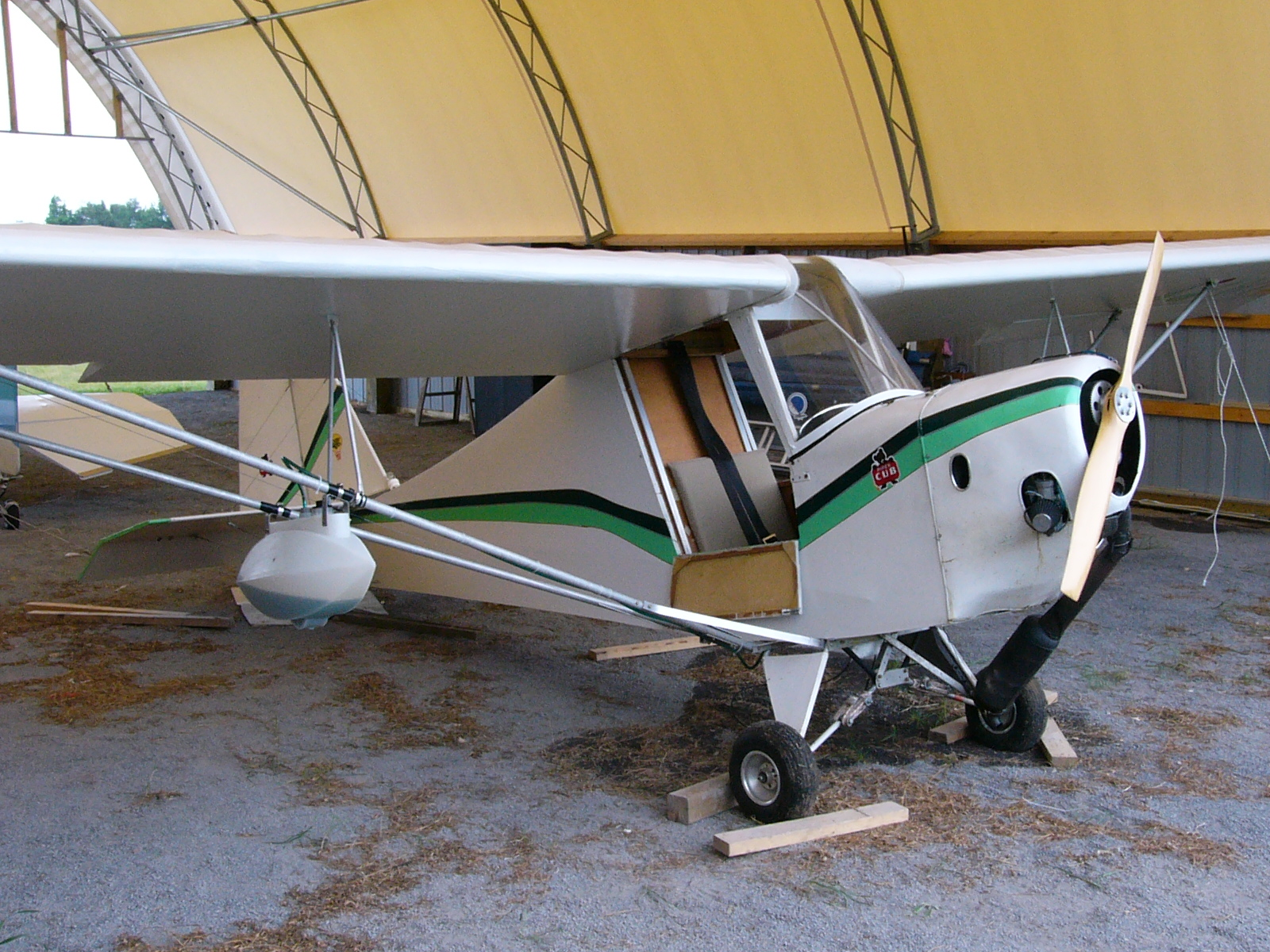
A Canadian-registered Fisher FP-101 modified with ASAP Chinook fuel tanks suspended from the jury struts and showing the cockpit access door open.

Data from Janes All the Worlds Aircraft 1986–87

General characteristics

- Crew: one
- Length: 16 ft 6 in (5.03 m)
- Wingspan: 28 ft 10 in (8.79 m)
- Height: 5 ft 8 in (1.73 m)
- Wing area: 116 sq ft (10.8 m^{2})
- Aspect ratio: 7.17
- Empty weight: 247 lb (112 kg)
- Gross weight: 500 lb (227 kg)
- Powerplant: 1 × Rotax 277 single cylinder, two-stroke, 28 hp (21 kW)
- Propellers: 2-bladed wooden, 5 ft 0 in (1.52 m) diameter

Performance

- Maximum speed: 60 mph (97 km/h, 52 kn)
- Cruise speed: 55 mph (89 km/h, 48 kn)
- Stall speed: 26 mph (42 km/h, 23 kn)
- Never exceed speed: 63 mph (101 km/h, 55 kn)
- Range: 150 mi (240 km, 130 nmi)
- Endurance: 3.0 hours
- g limits: +4.6/-2.3
- Maximum glide ratio: 9:1
- Rate of climb: 600 ft/min (3.0 m/s)
- Wing loading: 4.31 lb/sq ft (21.0 kg/m^{2})

== See also ==
Related development

- Fisher FP-202 Koala

Aircraft of comparable role, configuration, and era

- Aero-Works Aerolite 103
- Beaujon Mach .07
- Beaujon Enduro
- Birdman WT-11 Chinook
- Freebird I
- ISON Airbike
- Spectrum RX-28 Beaver
