= Fisher R-80 Tiger Moth =

Canadian homebuilt light aircraft

R-80 Tiger Moth
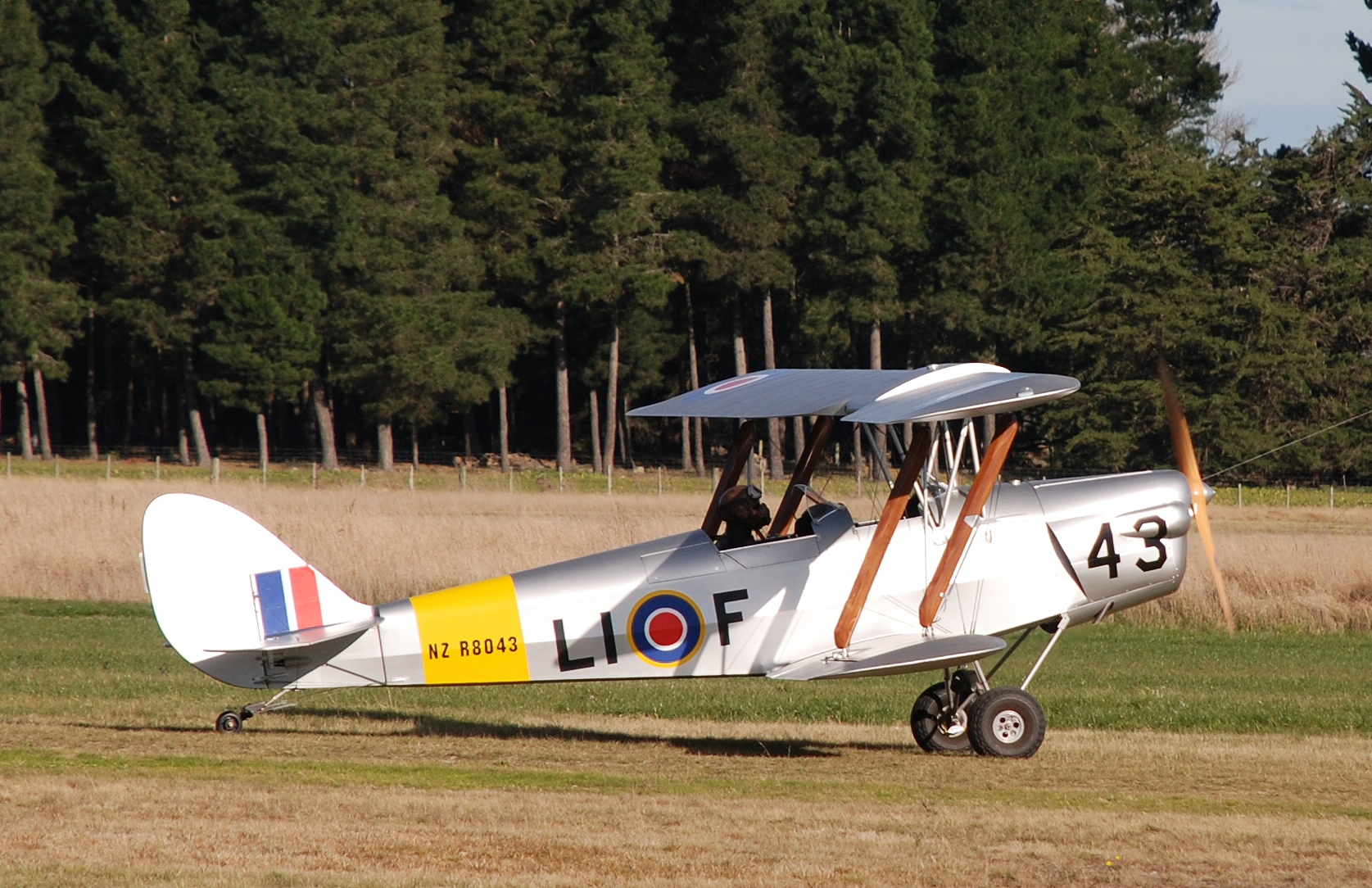

General information
- Type: Kit aircraft
- National origin: Canada
- Manufacturer: Fisher Flying Products
- Number built: 24 (2011)

History
- Introduction date: 1994
- First flight: 1994

The Fisher R-80 Tiger Moth is a Canadian two-seat, conventional landing gear, single engined, biplane kit aircraft designed for construction by amateur builders. The designation indicates that the aircraft is 80% the size of the aircraft that inspired it, the de Havilland Tiger Moth. Fisher Flying Products was originally based in Edgeley, North Dakota, USA but the company is now located in Woodbridge, Ontario, Canada.

== Development ==
The R-80 was designed by Fisher Aircraft in the United States in 1994 and was intended to comply with the US Experimental - Amateur-built category, although it qualifies as an ultralight aircraft in some countries, such as Canada. It also qualifies as a US Experimental Light Sport Aircraft. The R-80's standard empty weight is 560 lb (254 kg) when equipped with a 100 hp (75 kW) Norton AE 100R engine and it has a gross weight of 1,150 lb (522 kg).

The construction of the R-80 is of wood, with the wings, tail and fuselage covered with doped aircraft fabric. The aircraft features interplane struts and cabane struts. Like the original Tiger Moth, the R-80 has no flaps. The R-80's main landing gear is bungee suspended. Cockpit access is via the lower wing. The company claims an amateur builder would need 600 hours to build the R-80.

Specified engines for the R-80 version have included the 80 hp (60 kW) Geo Tracker auto-conversion engine and the 100 hp (75 kW) Norton AE 100R rotary engine.

By late 2011 more than 24 R-80s were flying.

In 2000 Fisher introduced a welded 4130 steel tube fuselage as an alternative to the standard wooden fuselage. This version featured a LOM M132 engine of 120 hp (89 kW), a gross weight of 1,350 lb (612 kg) and was developed at the request of customers. The steel fuselage version was known as the RS-80. Six RS-80s had been completed by the end of 2004. Since the company moved to Canada, the RS-80 option is no longer available.

In reviewing the R-80 Ben Millspaugh wrote in Kitplanes Magazine:

She flies beautifully. Ground handling is exceptionally easy and I'd recommend this airplane to anyone who is a first-time builder or any pilot with little or no tail dragger time.

== Operational history ==
In 2000 African Flying Adventures purchased four RS-80 kits to be used for tourist flying in Zimbabwe.

== Variants ==
R-80
Original version with wooden fuselage
RS-80
Version with welded 4130 steel tube fuselage, introduced in 2000 and discontinued 2008.

== Aircraft on display ==
- NX34TM Tillamook Air Museum, Tillamook, Oregon/

== Specifications (R-80) ==
Data from Company website, AeroCrafter & Kitplanes

General characteristics

- Crew: one
- Capacity: one passenger and 590 lb (268 kg) useful load
- Length: 19 ft 0 in (5.80 m)
- Wingspan: 23 ft 0 in (7.02 m)
- Height: 7 ft 4 in (2.24 m)
- Wing area: 170 sq ft (15.81 m^{2})
- Empty weight: 560 lb (254 kg)
- Max takeoff weight: 1,150 lb (522 kg)
- Powerplant: 1 × Norton AE 100R rotary engine, 100 hp (75 kW)

Performance

- Cruise speed: 90 mph (146 km/h, 78 kn)
- Stall speed: 35 mph (57 km/h, 30 kn)
- Never exceed speed: 110 mph (178 km/h, 96 kn)
- Rate of climb: 800 ft/min (4.1 m/s)
- Wing loading: 6.8 lb/sq ft (33.0 kg/m^{2})
- Power/mass: 11.5 lb/hp (0.143 kW/kg)

== Notable appearances in media ==
In 2015, an R-80 Tiger Moth built by Jerry Boughner was featured in the Taylor Swift video Wildest Dreams.

== See also ==
Related development

- RagWing RW22 Tiger Moth - a similar DH82 replica

Aircraft of comparable role, configuration, and era

- Fisher Celebrity
- Fisher FP-404
- Murphy Renegade
- Stolp Starduster Too
