= Fisher Dakota Hawk =

Canadian homebuilt light aircraft

Dakota Hawk
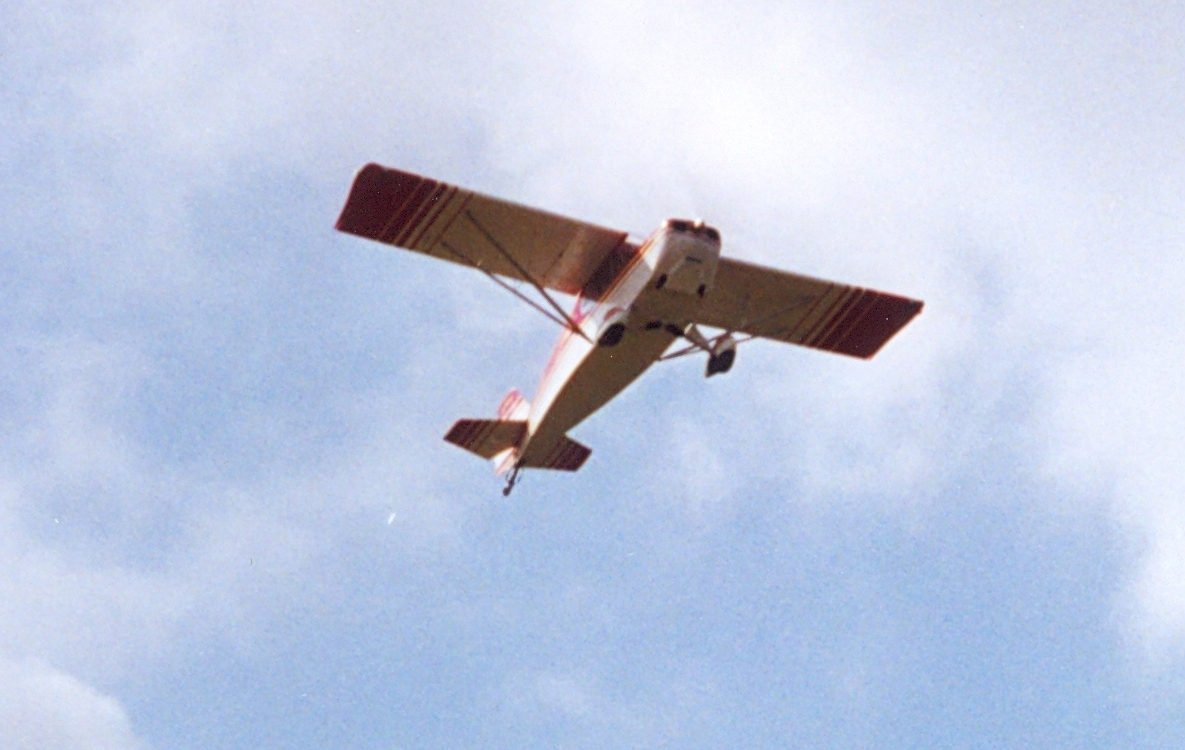
- Fischer Dakota Hawk

General information
- Type: Kit aircraft
- National origin: Canada
- Manufacturer: Fisher Flying Products
- Number built: 25 (2004)

History
- Introduction date: 1993
- First flight: 1993

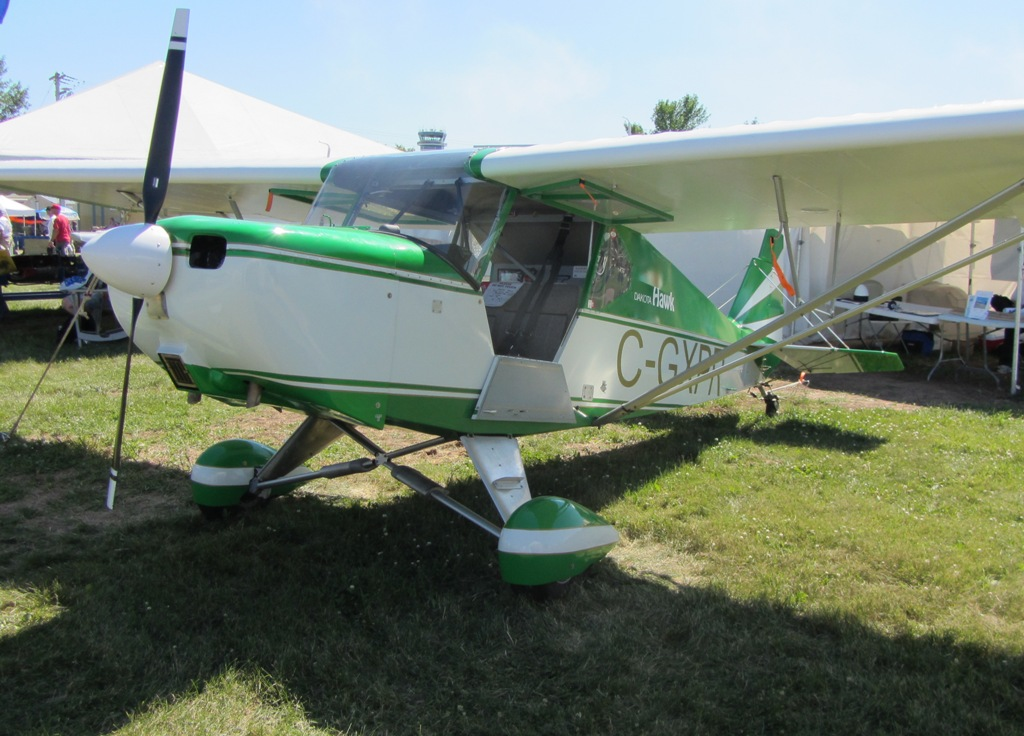
Dakota Hawk on display

The Fisher Dakota Hawk is a Canadian side-by-side two-seat, conventional landing gear, single-engined, high-wing monoplane kit aircraft designed for construction by amateur builders.

Fisher Flying Products was originally based in Edgeley, North Dakota, USA but the company is now located in Dorchester, Ontario, Canada.

== Development ==
The Dakota Hawk was designed by Fisher Aircraft in the United States in 1993 and was intended to comply with the US Experimental - Amateur-built category, although it qualifies as ultralight aircraft in some countries, such as Canada. It also qualifies as US Experimental Light Sport Aircraft.

The construction of the Dakota Hawk is of wood, with a wooden geodesic-construction fuselage and an I-beam wing spar. The wings, tail and fuselage are covered with doped aircraft fabric. The aircraft wing has "V" struts and jury struts. The Dakota Hawk's main landing gear uses bungee suspension with hydraulic brakes and wheel pants available as options. The tail wheel is steerable and the wings fold for storage or trailering. The company claims an amateur builder can complete either aircraft from the kit in 600 hours.

The specified engines for the Dakota Hawk include the following four-stroke aircraft engines:

- 65 hp (48 kW) Continental A65
- 80 hp (60 kW) Rotax 912UL
- 85 hp (63 kW) Continental C85
- 100 hp (75 kW) Continental O-200
- 100 hp (75 kW) Rotax 912ULS
- 120 hp (89 kW) Jabiru 3300

== Specifications (Dakota Hawk) ==
Data from Company website, AeroCrafter & Kitplanes

General characteristics

- Crew: one
- Capacity: one passenger
- Length: 19 ft 9 in (6.02 m)
- Wingspan: 28 ft 6 in (8.69 m)
- Height: 6 ft 1 in (1.85 m)
- Wing area: 128 sq ft (11.9 m^{2})
- Empty weight: 600 lb (272 kg)
- Gross weight: 1,150 lb (522 kg)
- Powerplant: 1 × Rotax 912UL four cylinder, four stroke piston aircraft engine, 80 hp (60 kW)

Performance

- Maximum speed: 100 mph (160 km/h, 87 kn)
- Cruise speed: 90 mph (140 km/h, 78 kn)
- Range: 250 mi (400 km, 220 nmi)
- Rate of climb: 800 ft/min (4.1 m/s)

== See also ==
Aircraft of comparable role, configuration, and era

- Aeronca 11 Chief
- Denney Kitfox
- Light Aero Avid Flyer
- Murphy Rebel
