= Fisher Celebrity =

Canadian ultralight aircraft

Celebrity
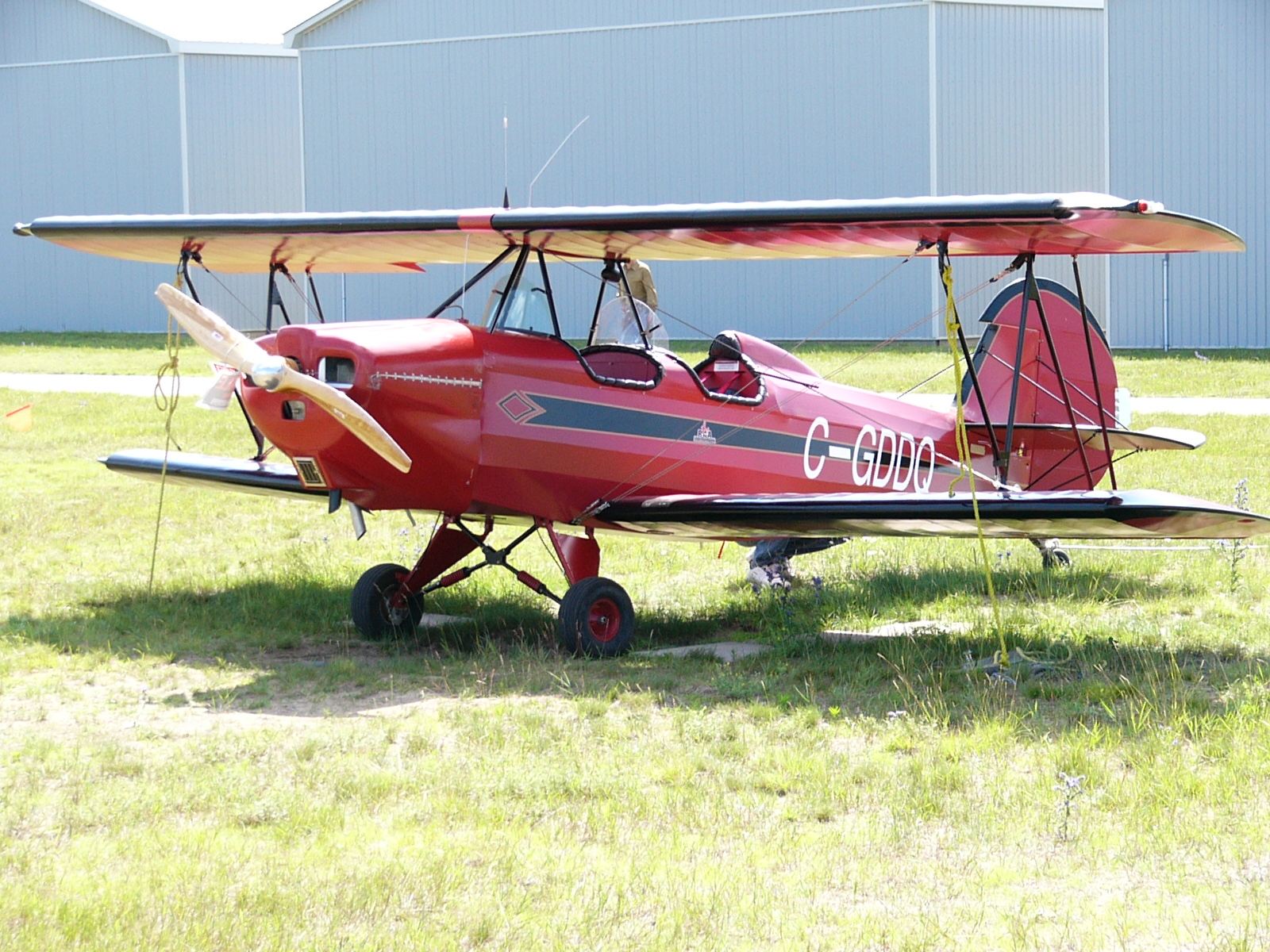

General information
- Type: Kit aircraft
- National origin: Canada
- Manufacturer: Fisher Flying Products
- Number built: 55 (2011)

History
- Introduction date: 1989
- First flight: 1989

The Fisher Celebrity is a Canadian two-seat, conventional landing gear, single engined, biplane kit aircraft designed for construction by amateur builders. Fisher Flying Products was originally based in Edgeley, North Dakota, United States but the company is now located in Dorchester, Ontario, Canada.

== Development ==
The Celebrity was designed by Fisher Aircraft in the United States in 1989 and was intended to comply with the US Experimental - Amateur-built category, although it qualifies as an ultralight aircraft in some countries, such as Canada. It also qualifies as a US Experimental Light Sport Aircraft. The Celebrity's standard empty weight is 600 lb (272 kg) when equipped with a four-stroke 100 hp (75 kW) Continental O-200 engine and it has a gross weight of 1,230 lb (558 kg).

The construction of the Celebrity is of wood, with the wings, tail and fuselage covered with doped aircraft fabric. An alternate welded 4130 steel fuselage was previously available, but is no longer offered by the manufacturer. The aircraft features interplane struts and inverted "V" cabane struts. Like most biplanes, the Celebrity has no flaps. The Celebrity's main landing gear is bungee suspended. Cockpit access is via the lower wing. The company claims an amateur builder would need 600 hours to build the Celebrity.

Specified engines for the Celebrity include the 65 hp (48 kW) Continental A-65, 85 hp (63 kW) Continental C-85, the 100 hp (75 kW) Continental O-200 and the 115 hp (86 kW) Lycoming O-235.

By late 2011 more than 55 Celebrities were flying.

In reviewing the Celebrity, John W. Conrad wrote in the July 1992 issue of Sport Pilot Hot Kits and Homebuilts Magazine:

Control, harmony, and mix are just right. Rudder, aileron, and elevator match perfectly, and blend into a very natural control feel. The Celebrity has a lot going for it. It is a very easy airplane to fly, yet it is a real biplane in every sense of the word.

== Specifications (Celebrity) ==
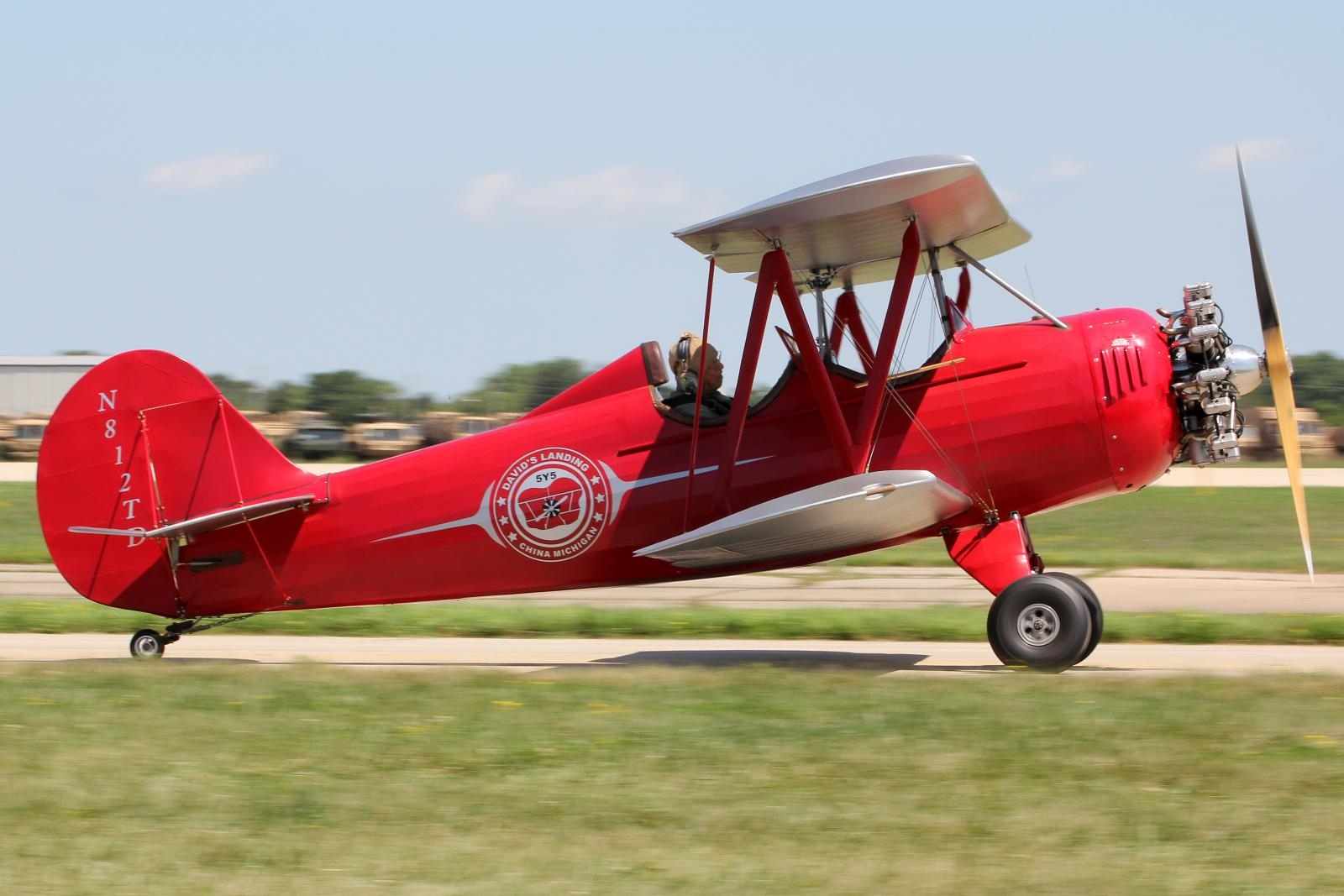
Fisher Celebrity powered by a radial engine

Data from Company website, AeroCrafter & Kitplanes

General characteristics

- Crew: one
- Capacity: one passenger and 630 lb (285 kg) useful load
- Length: 17 ft 6 in (5.33 m)
- Wingspan: 22 ft 0 in (6.71 m)
- Height: 6 ft 0 in (1.83 m)
- Wing area: 176 sq ft (16.37 m^{2})
- Empty weight: 600 lb (272 kg)
- Max takeoff weight: 1,230 lb (557 kg)
- Powerplant: 1 × Continental O-200 Four cylinder, four-stroke piston aircraft engine, 100 hp (75 kW)

Performance

- Maximum speed: 95 mph (154 km/h, 83 kn)
- Cruise speed: 85 mph (138 km/h, 74 kn)
- Stall speed: 40 mph (65 km/h, 35 kn)
- Never exceed speed: 120 mph (194 km/h, 100 kn)
- Rate of climb: 800 ft/min (4.1 m/s)
- Wing loading: 7.0 lb/sq ft (34.03 kg/m^{2})
- Power/mass: 12.3 lb/hp (0.135 kW/kg)

== See also ==
Aircraft of comparable role, configuration, and era

- Fisher FP-404
- Fisher Classic
- Murphy Renegade
- Sorrell Hiperlight
- Stolp Starduster Too
