= Fisher Horizon =

Canadian ultralight aircraft

Horizon 1 & 2

General information
- Type: Kit aircraft
- National origin: Canada
- Manufacturer: Fisher Flying Products
- Number built: Horizon 1 - 55 (2011); Horizon 2 - 40 (2011)

History
- Introduction date: 1990 (Horizon 1); 1991 (Horizon 2)
- First flight: 1990 (Horizon 1); 1991 (Horizon 2)

The Fisher Horizon is a family of Canadian two-seats-in-tandem, conventional landing gear, single-engined, high-wing monoplane kit aircraft designed for construction by amateur builders. The Horizon 1 was inspired by the Aeronca Champion and its later version, the Bellanca Citabria, while the Horizon 2 was inspired by the Cessna O-1 Bird Dog.

Fisher Flying Products was originally based in Edgeley, North Dakota, USA but the company is now located in Woodbridge, Ontario, Canada.

== Development ==
The Horizon 1 was designed by Fisher Aircraft in the United States in 1990, with the Horizon 2 following the next year. Both were intended to comply with the US Experimental - Amateur-built category, although both types qualify as ultralight aircraft in some countries, such as Canada. They also qualify as US Experimental Light Sport Aircraft.

The construction of the Horizon is of wood, with the wings, tail and fuselage covered with doped aircraft fabric. The aircraft features "V" struts, jury struts and a modified GA (W)-2 airfoil. The Horizon's main landing gear uses bungee suspension. The company claims an amateur builder can complete either aircraft from the kit in 600 hours.

The specified engines for the Horizon include the 65 hp (48 kW) or 85 hp (63 kW) Limbach Flugmotoren Volkswagen air-cooled engine–based four-stroke or the Lycoming O-235.

== Variants ==
Horizon 1
Two-seat tandem high-wing STOL aircraft with no rear window, flaps and swept tail. Standard empty weight is 520 lb (236 kg) when equipped with a 65 hp (48 kW) Limbach Flugmotoren engine and it has a gross weight of 1,050 lb (476 kg). Fifty-five examples flying by 2011.
Horizon 2
Two-seat tandem high-wing STOL aircraft with a rear window, slotted flaps and ailerons and rounded tail. Standard empty weight is 570 lb (259 kg) when equipped with an 85 hp (63 kW) Limbach Flugmotoren engine and it has a gross weight of 1,050 lb (476 kg). Forty examples flying by 2011.

== Specifications ==
Data from Company website, AeroCrafter & Kitplanes

General characteristics

- Crew: one
- Capacity: one passenger and 530 lb (240 kg) useful load
- Length: 18 ft 8 in (5.69 m)
- Wingspan: 25 ft 3 in (7.70 m)
- Height: 5 ft 8 in (1.73 m)
- Wing area: 113 sq ft (10.51 m^{2})
- Airfoil: modified GA (W)-2
- Empty weight: 520 lb (236 kg)
- Max takeoff weight: 1,050 lb (476 kg)
- Powerplant: 1 × Limbach Flugmotoren Four-stroke, four-cylinder Volkswagen air-cooled engine, 65 hp (48 kW)

Performance

- Maximum speed: 100 mph (162 km/h, 87 kn)
- Cruise speed: 85 mph (138 km/h, 74 kn)
- Stall speed: 40 mph (65 km/h, 35 kn)
- Never exceed speed: 120 mph (194 km/h, 100 kn)
- Rate of climb: 800 ft/min (4.1 m/s)
- Wing loading: 9.3 lb/sq ft (45.3 kg/m^{2})
- Power/mass: 16.2 lb/hp (0.101 kW/kg)

== See also ==
Aircraft of comparable role, configuration, and era

- Denney Kitfox
- Light Aero Avid Flyer
- Murphy Rebel
