= Fisher Flying Products =

Canadian homebuilt aircraft manufacturer

- Company type: Private company
- Industry: Aerospace
- Founded: 1984
- Founder: Mike Fisher and Wayne Ison
- Headquarters: Straffordville, Ontario, Canada
- Key people: Gene and Darlene Jackson-Hanson, owners 1984-2007; Paul Riedlinger, owner 2007-2014. Dave Hertner owner 2014-2022; Ckd Aero owner 2022-present
- Products: Kit aircraft
- Website: fisherflying.com

Fisher Flying Products is a Canadian aircraft manufacturer that produces kits for a wide line of light aircraft. The company's kits all feature wooden construction with aircraft fabric covering. Many of the designs are reproductions of classic aircraft, such as the company's 80% Fisher R-80 Tiger Moth that is based upon the de Havilland Tiger Moth.

== History ==
Founded by Michael E. Fisher and Wayne Ison in the early 1980s as Lite Flite Inc, Aero Visions and later Fisher Aero Corporation, ownership of Fisher Flying Products was later passed to Gene and Darlene Jackson-Hanson in 1984. The company was originally based in South Webster, Ohio and later Edgeley, North Dakota, USA. In 2007 the Jackson-Hansons decided to sell the company and retire.

The company was purchased by Paul Riedlinger and moved to Woodbridge, Ontario, Canada. By early 2009 the new owner had re-established the manufacturing operation and commenced producing kits, starting with the Dakota Hawk and the FP-202. By late 2009 all kits were once again available.

The first two designs the company built were the Fisher Flyer, which incorporated a new fuselage and tail and the existing wings from the UFM Easy Riser hang glider and the Fisher Barnstormer, a negative stagger biplane. Plans and kits for the latter design were offered in the early 1980s.

On 15 January 2014 president Paul Riedlinger announced that the company was for sale. In mid-2014 the company was sold to Dave Hertner, owner of Effectus AeroProducts, and moved to Dorchester, Ontario.

In 2022, Ckdpack Inc. bought a majority stake in the company and named Arun Modgil as company head. The company intends to manufacture kits at Ckdpack's plants, located on three continents.

== Aircraft ==
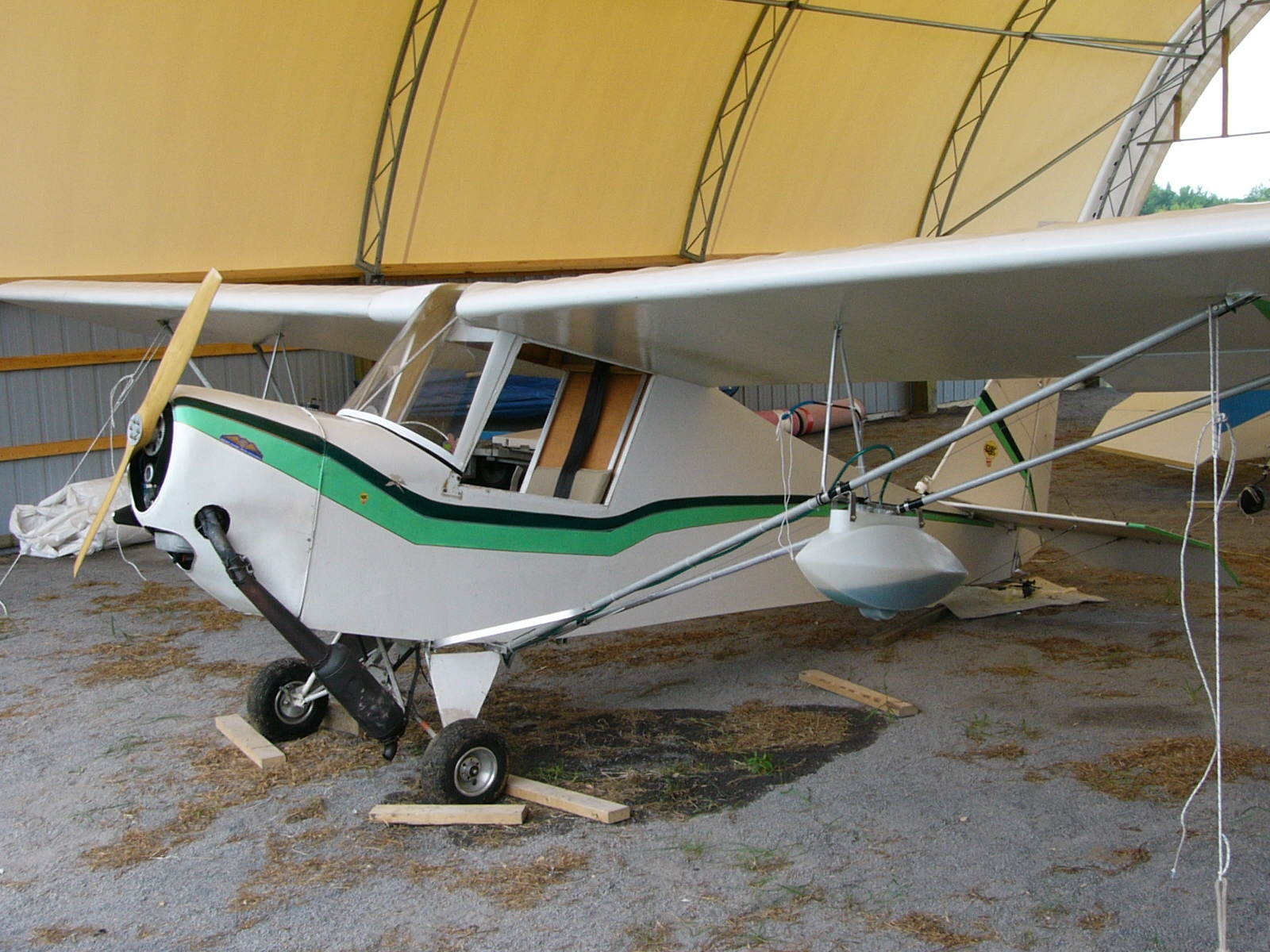
Fisher FP-101

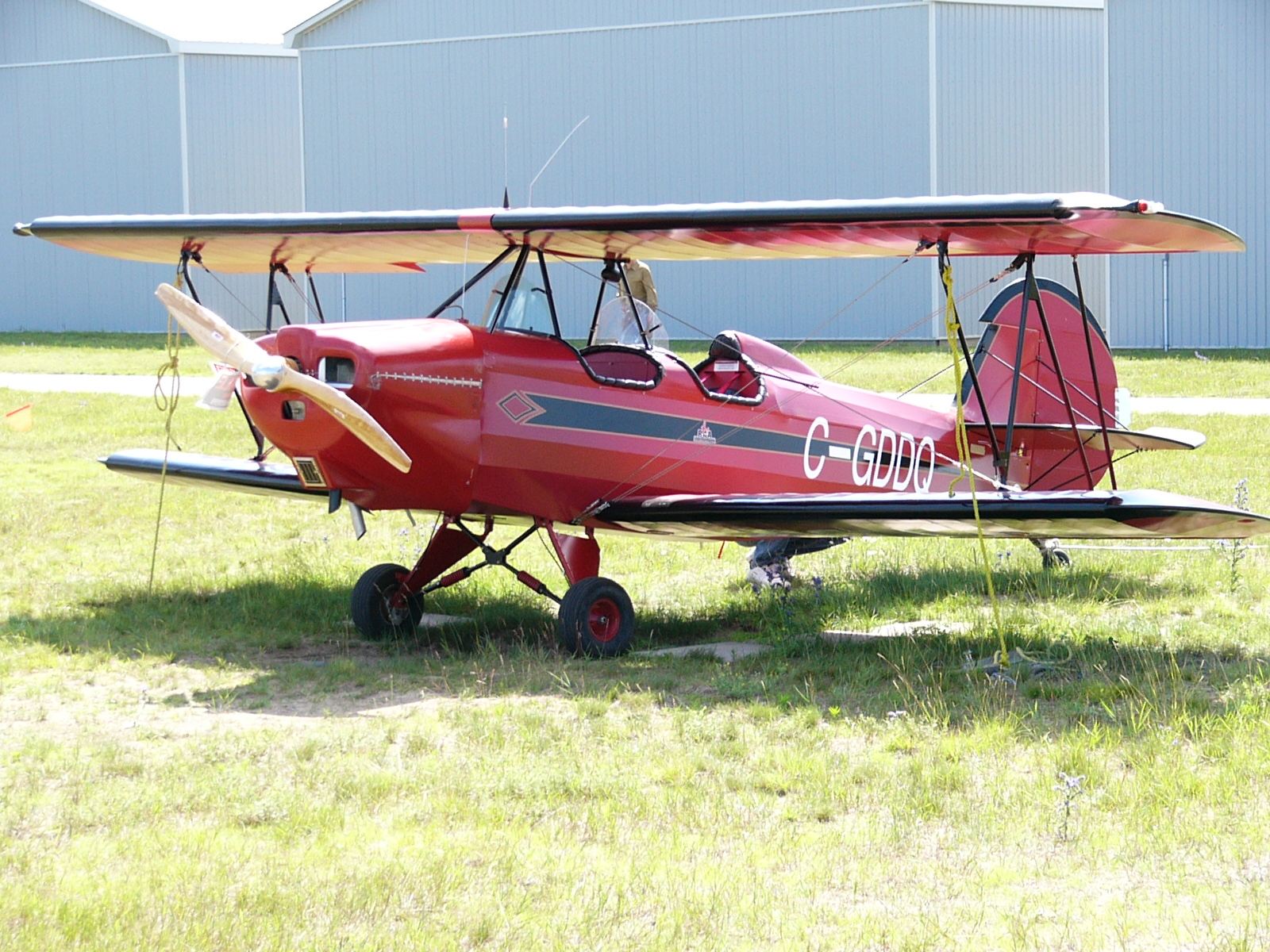
Fisher Celebrity biplane

The company currently has 15 different designs available and had over 3,500 aircraft flying in 2007.

Summary of aircraft built by Fisher
Model name	First flight	Number built (as of)	Type	Replica of, or inspired by
Fisher Flyer	1980	1	Single seat biplane ultralight	UFM Easy Riser
Fisher Barnstormer	1982		Single seat negative stagger biplane ultralight	
Fisher Boomerang	1982		Single seat high wing ultralight	
Fisher Culex			Tandem 2-seat twin-engined mid-wing monoplane	
Fisher Mariah			Tandem 2-seat low-wing monoplane	
Fisher FP-101	1982		Single seat high wing ultralight	Piper J-3 Cub
Fisher FP-202 Koala	1981	325 (2004)	Single seat high wing ultralight	Piper J-3 Cub
Fisher FP-303	1982	200 (2004)	Low wing, single seat ultralight	
Fisher Super Koala	1983	105 (2011)	Two seat high wing amateur-built	Piper J-3 Cub
Fisher FP-404	1984	350 (2004)	Single seat biplane amateur-built	Single seat version of Fisher Classic
Fisher FP-505 Skeeter	1984	50 (2004)	Single seat parasol wing ultralight	Pietenpol Air Camper
Fisher FP-606 Sky Baby	1986	25 (2004)	Single seat high wing ultralight	Cessna 150
Fisher Classic	1987	150 (2004)	Two seat biplane amateur-built	Two seat version of Fisher FP-404
Fisher Celebrity	1989	30 (2004)	Two seat biplane amateur-built	
Fisher Horizon 1	1990	50 (2004)	Two seat high wing amateur-built	Bellanca Citabria
Fisher Horizon 2	1991	30 (2004)	Two seat high wing amateur-built	O-1 Bird Dog
Fisher Dakota Hawk	1993	25 (2004)	High wing two seat amateur-built	
Fisher Avenger	1994	50 (2004)	Low wing, single seat ultralight	
Fisher R-80 Tiger Moth	1994	6 (2004)	Two seat biplane amateur-built	de Havilland Tiger Moth
Fisher Youngster	1994	10 (2004)	Single seat biplane amateur-built	Bücker Bü 133 Jungmeister
