= Fisher FP-202 Koala =

Canadian ultralight aircraft

FP-202 Koala
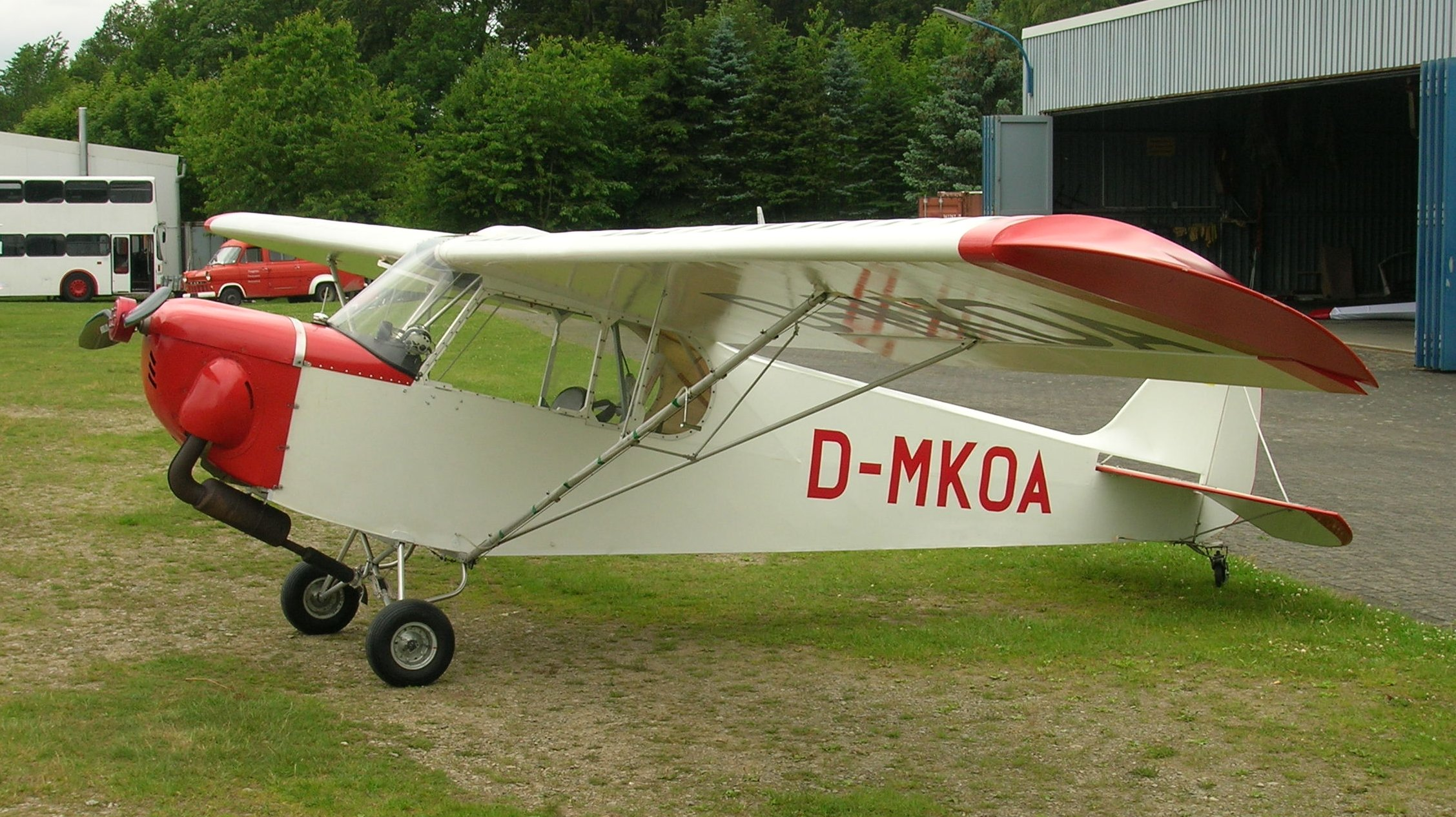
- FP-202 Koala

General information
- Type: Kit aircraft
- National origin: Canada
- Manufacturer: Fisher Flying Products
- Number built: 330 (2011)

History
- First flight: 1981
- Developed from: Piper J-3

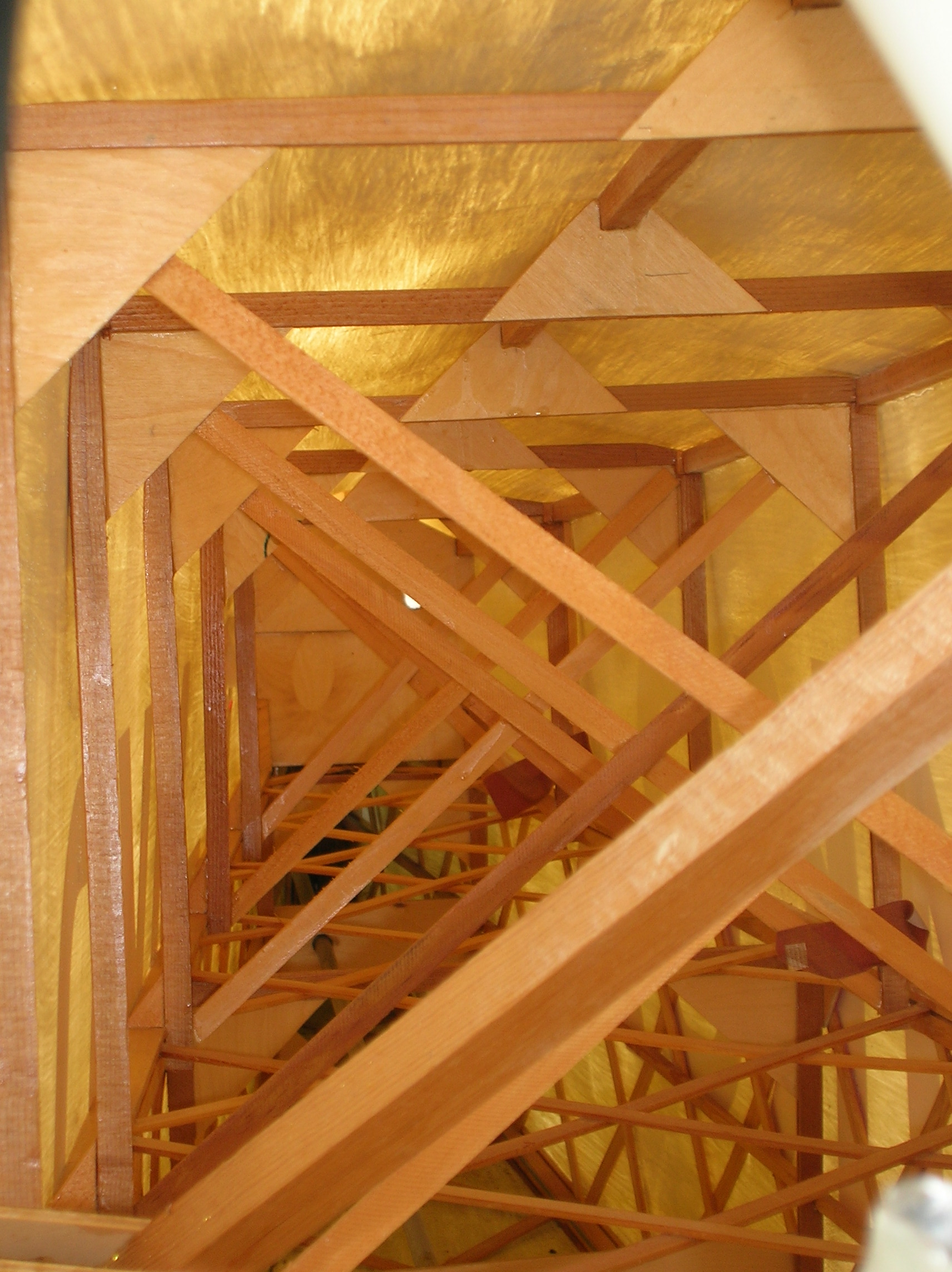
Detail of FP-202 internal structure

The Fisher FP-202 Koala is a Canadian single-seat high wing, conventional landing gear, single engined light kit aircraft designed for construction by amateur builders. The aircraft was inspired by the design of the Piper J-3 Cub and outwardly resembles that design.

Fisher Flying Products was originally based in Edgeley, North Dakota, United States but the company is now located in Dorchester, Ontario, Canada.

== Development ==
The FP-202 was designed by Fisher Aircraft in the United States in 1981 and was intended to meet the requirements of the US FAR 103 Ultralight Vehicles category, including that category's maximum 254 lb (115 kg) empty weight. It is also a 51% approved kit for the US homebuilt aircraft category. The design goal was to provide ultralight pilots with an aircraft that looked like and flew like the classic Piper Cub, without the regulation that goes with owning a type certified aircraft. The FP-202 can achieve an empty weight of 250 lb (113 kg) when equipped with a lightweight, two-stroke engine, such as the 28 hp (21 kW) Rotax 277.

The construction of the FP-202 is unusual for aircraft in its class. The aircraft's structure is entirely made from wood, with the wooden fuselage built from wood strips arranged in a geodesic form, resulting in a very strong and light aircraft with redundant load paths. Like the Cub, both the wings and fuselage on the Koala are covered with doped aircraft fabric. The wings are strut-braced and utilize jury struts. The landing gear is bungee suspended and the tail wheel is steerable. Brakes are optional. The company claims it would take an average amateur builder 250–500 hours to build the FP-202.

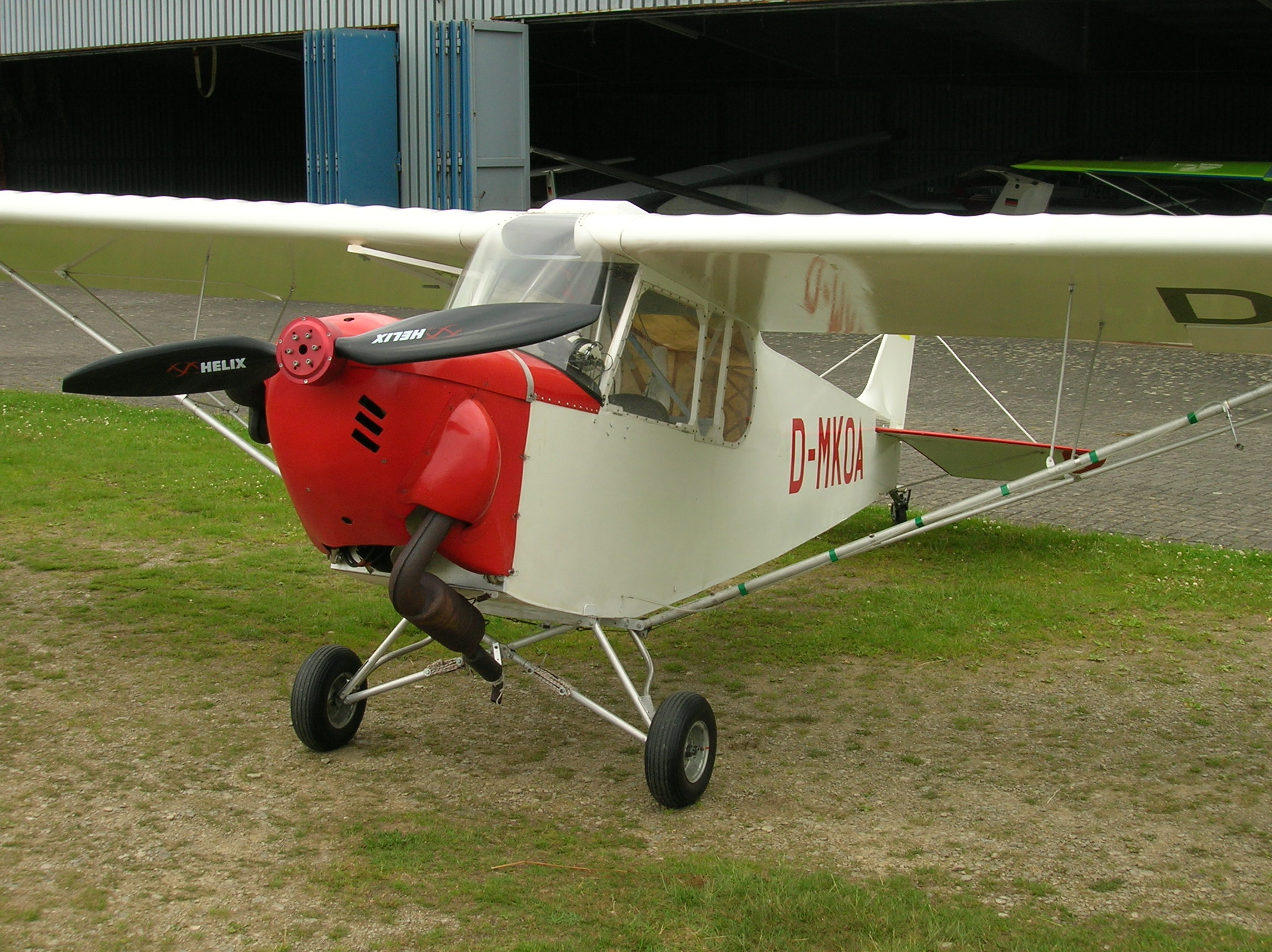
FP-202 quarter front view

== Specifications (FP-202 Koala) ==
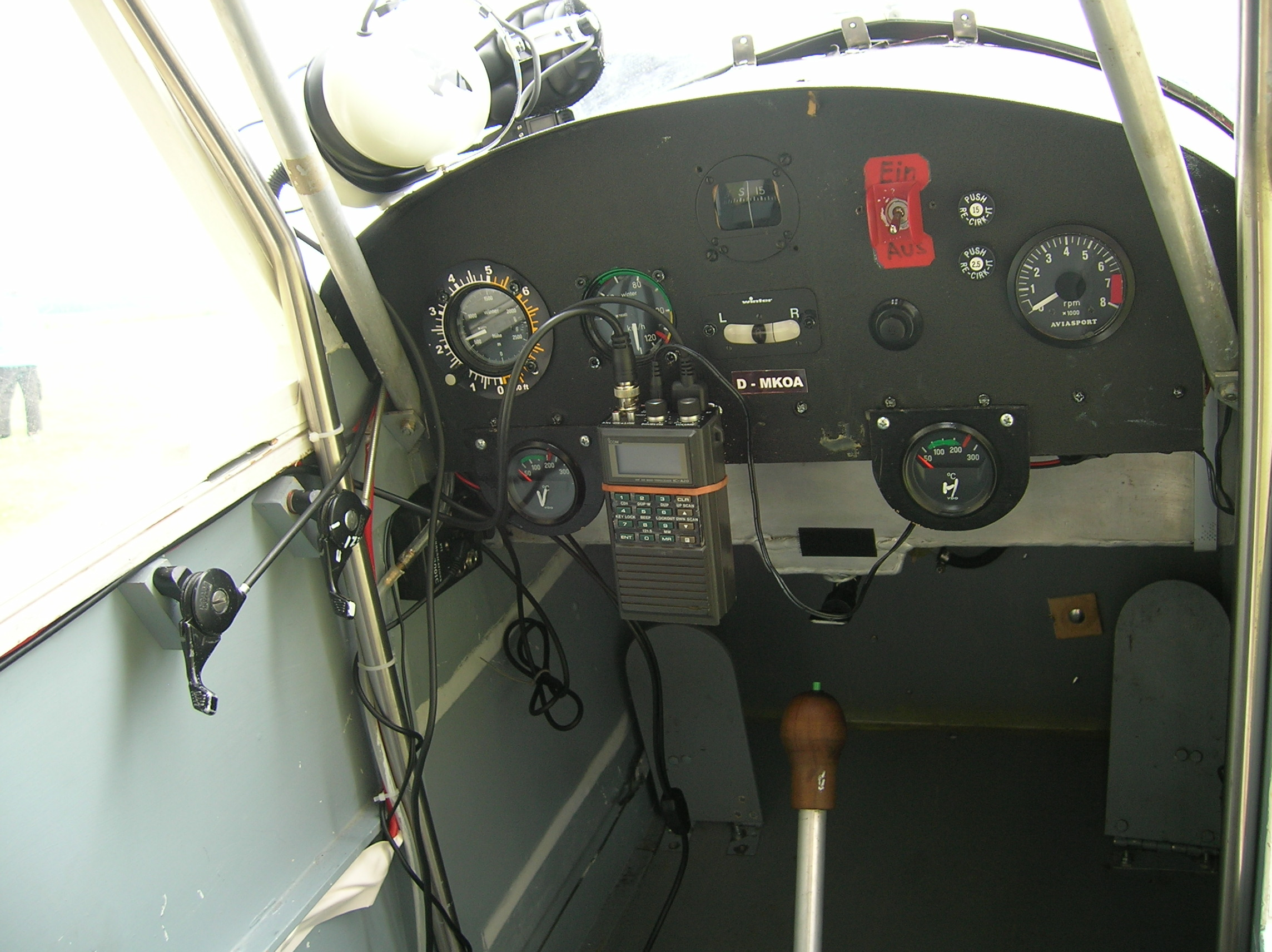
FP-202 instrument panel

Data from AeroCrafter and KitPlanes

General characteristics

- Crew: one
- Length: 17.9 ft (5.5 m)
- Wingspan: 29.9 ft (9.1 m)
- Height: 5.8 ft (1.8 m)
- Wing area: 120 sq ft (11 m^{2})
- Empty weight: 245 lb (111 kg)
- Gross weight: 500 lb (227 kg)
- Fuel capacity: 5 U.S. gallons (19 L; 4.2 imp gal)
- Powerplant: 1 × Rotax 277 single cylinder, air-cooled, two stroke aircraft engine, 28 hp (21 kW)
- Propellers: 2-bladed wooden, fixed pitch

Performance

- Maximum speed: 62 mph (100 km/h, 54 kn)
- Cruise speed: 57 mph (92 km/h, 50 kn)
- Stall speed: 26 mph (42 km/h, 23 kn)
- Range: 135 mi (217 km, 117 nmi)
- Service ceiling: 10,000 ft (3,000 m)
- Rate of climb: 750 ft/min (3.8 m/s)

== See also ==
Related development

- Fisher Super Koala
- Fisher FP-101
- Fisher FP-303
- Fisher FP-404
- Fisher FP-505

Aircraft of comparable role, configuration, and era

- Team Mini-Max Hi-MAX
- Fisher FP-202 Koala
- Light Miniature Aircraft LM-1
- Preceptor N3 Pup
- Hipp's Superbirds J-3 Kitten (Preceptor Pup is designed by a former Hipps worker)
- Belite Ultra Cub
- Ultravia Pelican
- Rocky Mountain Wings Ridge Runner
- Anglin J6 Karatoo
- Norman Aviation J6 Karatoo
- Aero-Works Aerolite 103
- Beaujon Mach .07
- Beaujon Enduro
- Birdman WT-11 Chinook
- ISON Airbike
- Spectrum RX-28 Beaver
