= Youngster =

Youngster may refer to:

- a child
- the Fisher Youngster single seat aircraft
