= Stolp Starduster Too =

American homebuilt biplane

Stolp Starduster Too SA 300
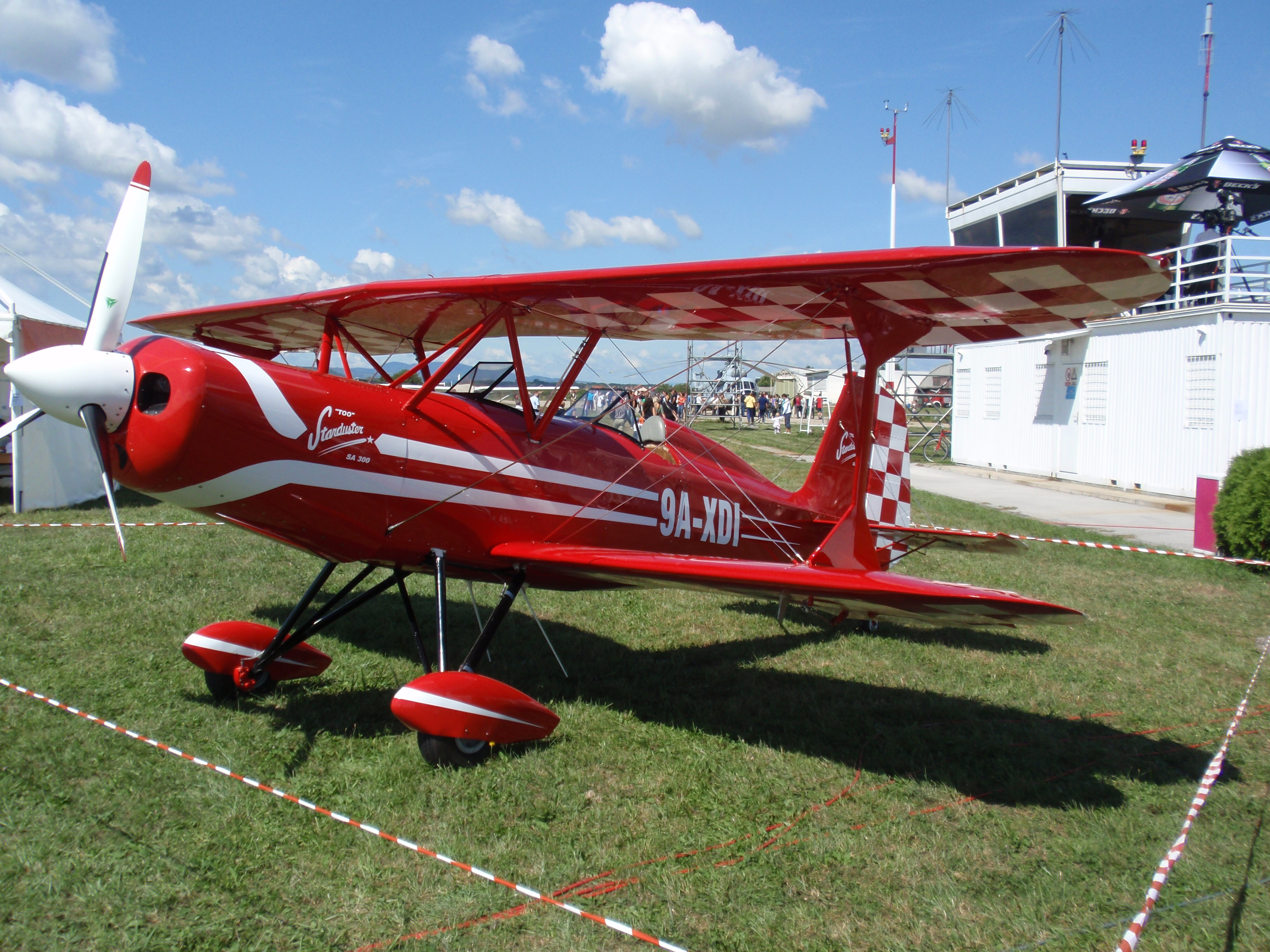
- Starduster Too

General information
- Type: Sport biplane
- National origin: United States
- Manufacturer: Stolp Starduster Corporation
- Designer: Lou Stolp

History
- Developed from: Stolp Starduster

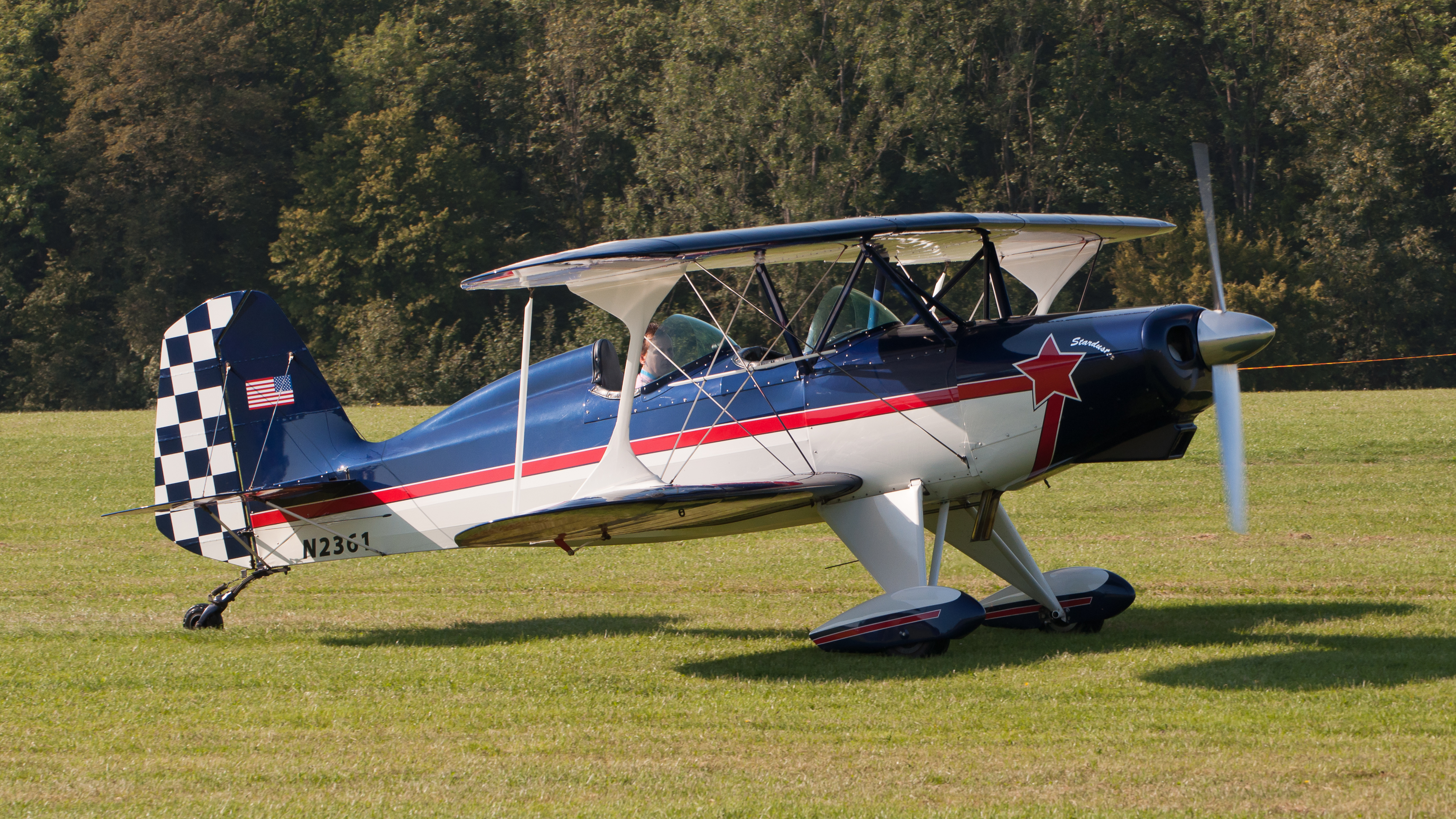
Stolp SA.300 Starduster Too with a Lycoming I0-360 engine

The Stolp Starduster Too SA300 is a two-seat, conventional landing gear equipped, homebuilt biplane. Aircraft Spruce & Specialty Co currently holds rights to sell plans for the aircraft.

== Design and development ==
The Starduster Too was developed to be an economical two-seat sport biplane. The airplane is designed to plus 6 or minus 6 G loading. It was not intended for use in aerobatic competition, but it can perform basic aerobatics.

The fuselage is made of 4130 steel tubing with fabric covering. The spars are made of spruce wood with plywood wooden wing ribs. The base engine is a Lycoming O-360 180 hp (134 kW) engine, but alternative examples have been built using the Lycoming IO-540, Ranger, Ford V-8 and V-6, Continental, Jacobs, and even Pratt & Whitney R-985 engines.

== Operational history ==
The Starduster Too is a popular biplane homebuilt design. There are several with over 2500 hours of flight time, and one with over 5000 hours.

== Variants ==
The Stolp Acroduster, and Stolp Acroduster Too, were the follow on models to the Starduster. They were scaled down 10 percent, and stressed to 9g. The first example was registered as a Schrack-Stolp Super Starduster Too.

One example of a Starduster Too was modified with retractable gear and a sliding canopy. The aircraft named "Samsong" was able to cruise at 150 mph, and had an 830-mile range with 45 gallons of fuel using modified gear legs from a Cessna 140

== Specifications Starduster Too ==
Data from Aircraft Spruce

General characteristics

- Capacity: 2
- Length: 20 ft 7 in (6.27 m)
- Wingspan: 24 ft (7.3 m)
- Height: 7 ft 3 in (2.21 m)
- Wing area: 165 sq ft (15.3 m^{2})
- Airfoil: M6
- Empty weight: 1,000 lb (454 kg)
- Gross weight: 1,704 lb (773 kg)
- Fuel capacity: 28 Fuse 15 Wing
- Powerplant: 1 × Lycoming O-360 , 180 hp (130 kW)

Performance

- Maximum speed: 160 kn (180 mph, 290 km/h)
- Cruise speed: 116 kn (134 mph, 216 km/h)
- Stall speed: 49 kn (56 mph, 90 km/h)
- Service ceiling: 23,000 ft (7,000 m)
- g limits: +/- 6
- Roll rate: 120°/s
- Rate of climb: 1,500 ft/min (7.6 m/s)

== See also ==
Aircraft of comparable role, configuration, and era

- Acro Sport II
- Aviat Eagle II (Christen Eagle)
- Fisher Celebrity
- Fisher FP-404
- Fisher R-80 Tiger Moth
- Marquart MA-5 Charger
