= Fisher Mariah =

American homebuilt airplane

General information
- Type: Two-seat recreational monoplane
- National origin: United States
- Manufacturer: Fisher Aero Corporation
- Status: Kit production completed

The Fisher Mariah is an American two-seat single-engined monoplane designed for amateur construction originally by Fisher Aero Corporation. Today the aircraft is supplied in the form of a kit or plans for amateur construction by Mike Fisher Aircraft.

== Development ==
The Mariah is a low-wing monoplane with tandem seating for two and powered by a 125 hp (93 kW) Continental C-125 or equivalent engine. Constructed from wood and fabric, it has a fixed nosewheel landing gear.

== Specifications ==
Data from Taylor & Buy Planes

General characteristics

- Crew: 2
- Length: 20 ft 0 in (6.10 m)
- Wingspan: 25 ft 0 in (7.62 m)
- Empty weight: 800 lb (363 kg)
- Gross weight: 1,300 lb (590 kg)
- Fuel capacity: 22 US gallons (84 litres)
- Powerplant: 1 × Continental C-125 or equivalent piston, 125 hp (93 kW)

Performance

- Maximum speed: 150 mph (240 km/h, 130 kn)
- Cruise speed: 130 mph (209 km/h, 113 kn)
- Range: 390 mi (628 km, 339 nmi)
- Rate of climb: 1,200 ft/min (6.1 m/s)
