= Glenn Truesdell =

American businessman and politician

Glenn Truesdell (June 1, 1909 – 1992) was an American businessman and politician.

Born in Edgeley, North Dakota, Truesdell was in the farming and gas business. He was also an auctioneer and assessor and lived in Pine City, Minnesota. He served in the Minnesota House of Representatives from 1959 to 1960.
