= Fisher Super Koala =

Ultralight aircraft design

Super Koala

General information
- Type: Kit aircraft
- National origin: Canada
- Manufacturer: Fisher Flying Products
- Number built: 105 (2011)

History
- First flight: 1982
- Developed from: Piper J-3 Cub

The Fisher Super Koala is a two-seat, high wing, conventional landing gear, single-engined, light kit aircraft designed for construction by amateur builders. The aircraft was inspired by the design of the Piper J-3 Cub and strongly resembles that design.

Fisher Flying Products was originally based in Edgeley, North Dakota, United States but the company is now located in Dorchester, Ontario, Canada.

== Development ==
The Super Koala was designed by Fisher Aircraft in the United States and was first flown in 1983. It has two seats in side-by-side configuration. With its 400 lb (181 kg) empty weight and 830 lb (376 kg) maximum gross weight, the Super Koala was intended for the US homebuilt aircraft category.

The construction of the Super Koala is unusual for aircraft in its class. The aircraft's structure is entirely made from wood, with the wooden fuselage built from wood strips arranged in a geodesic form, resulting in a very strong and light aircraft with redundant load paths. Like the Cub, both the wings and fuselage on the Super Koala are covered with doped aircraft fabric. The wings are strut-braced and utilize jury struts. The landing gear is bungee suspended and the tail wheel is steerable. The Super Koala has flaps, with brakes optional. The company claims it takes an average amateur builder 500 hours to construct a Super Koala.

Engine options are the 50 hp (37 kW) Rotax 503 and the 64 hp (48 kW) Rotax 582 engine. With the Rotax 503 the gross weight is 740 lb (336 kg) and with the Rotax 582 is 830 lb (376 kg).

== Specifications (Super Koala) ==
Data from Manufacturer, Kitplanes, Aerocrafter

General characteristics

- Crew: one
- Capacity: one passenger
- Length: 18 ft 1 in (5.51 m)
- Wingspan: 31 ft 0 in (9.45 m)
- Height: 5 ft 7 in (1.70 m)
- Wing area: 140 sq ft (13 m^{2})
- Empty weight: 400 lb (181 kg)
- Gross weight: 830 lb (376 kg)
- Fuel capacity: 10 U.S. gallons (38 L; 8.3 imp gal)
- Powerplant: 1 × Rotax 582 twin cylinder, liquid-cooled, two stroke aircraft engine, 64 hp (48 kW)

Performance

- Cruise speed: 75 mph (121 km/h, 65 kn)
- Stall speed: 32 mph (51 km/h, 28 kn)
- Never exceed speed: 95 mph (153 km/h, 83 kn)
- Range: 259 mi (417 km, 225 nmi)
- Service ceiling: 10,000 ft (3,000 m)
- Rate of climb: 1,100 ft/min (5.6 m/s)
- Wing loading: 5.92 lb/sq ft (28.9 kg/m^{2})
- Power/mass: 12.96 lb/hp (0.13 kW/kg)

== See also ==
- Fisher FP-202 Koala
