= Fisher Flyer =

American ultralight aircraft

General information
- Type: Ultralight aircraft
- National origin: United States
- Manufacturer: Lite Flite
- Designer: Michael E. Fisher
- Number built: 1

History
- Introduction date: 1980
- First flight: July 1980
- Developed from: UFM Easy Riser

The Fisher Flyer was a single seat tricycle landing gear biplane ultralight aircraft, which was first flown by Michael Fisher in July 1980. It was the first aircraft designed by Fisher and became the first of more than 3500 Fisher aircraft flying by 2007.

== Development ==
The Flyer was specifically designed to meet the requirements of the US FAR 103 Ultralight Vehicles category, which was under regulatory consideration at the time the aircraft was built. These requirements included a maximum empty weight of 254 lb (115 kg).

The aircraft was a conventional single-seat ultralight, featuring wings sourced from the Easy Riser hang glider. However, the fuselage and tail were of original design. The airframe structure was of aluminum tube, covered with aircraft fabric. The landing gear was of a fixed tricycle configuration.

The Flyer was fitted with a 30 hp (22 kW) Zenoah engine. The aircraft had an empty weight of 240 lb (109 kg) and a gross weight of 420 lb (191 kg), giving a useful load of just 180 lb (82 kg)

== Operational history ==
Only one Flyer was built and, because FAR Part 103 was not in effect yet, the aircraft was registered as an Experimental – Amateur-built. As of October 2009 the aircraft is no longer registered with the FAA.

== Specifications (Flyer) ==
Data from Janes All the Worlds Aircraft 1982–83

General characteristics

- Crew: one
- Length: 14 ft 0 in (4.27 m)
- Wingspan: 26 ft 0 in (7.92 m)
- Height: 6 ft 0 in (1.83 m)
- Empty weight: 240 lb (109 kg)
- Gross weight: 420 lb (191 kg)
- Powerplant: 1 × Zenoah two-stroke engine, 30 hp (22 kW)

Performance

- Cruise speed: 45 mph (72 km/h, 39 kn)

== See also ==
Aircraft of comparable role, configuration, and era

- Fisher FP-404
- Jean St-Germain Raz-Mut
- Murphy Renegade
