= Jean St-Germain Raz-Mut =

Ultralight aircraft developed in Canada in the 1970s

Raz-Mut
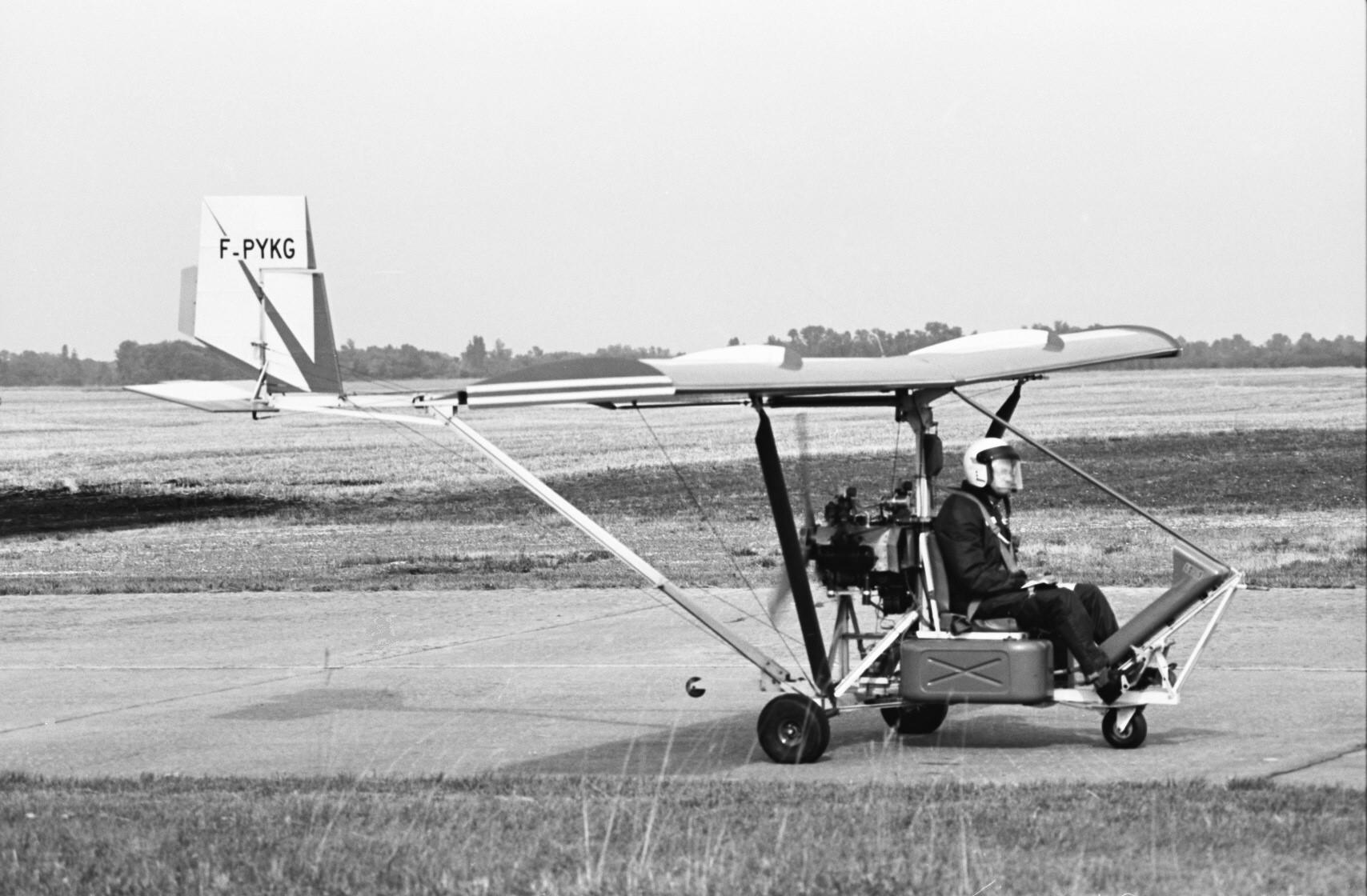

General information
- Type: Ultralight aircraft
- National origin: Canada
- Manufacturer: Centre de Recherches Jean St-Germain for homebuilding
- Designer: Jean St-Germain

History
- First flight: September 1976

The Jean St-Germain Raz-Mut was an ultralight aircraft developed in Canada in the 1970s and marketed in kit form for homebuilding.

== Design ==
It was a minimalist, open framework design consisting of a three-wheeled chassis supporting a pilot seat and pusher engine installation, to which a rigid wing of aluminium structure and skin was attached by struts. A conventional empennage of fabric-covered aluminium construction was carried on a long boom aft of the wing, and supported with a strut to the chassis.

== Operational history ==
In August 2009 there were three Raz-Mut 440As on the Canadian Civil Register, all registered as amateur-builts, although at one time seven were registered.

== Specifications ==
General characteristics

- Crew: One pilot
- Length: 5.58 m (18 ft 4 in)
- Wingspan: 7.01 m (23 ft 0 in)
- Height: 1.77 m (5 ft 10 in)
- Empty weight: 173 kg (380 lb)
- Gross weight: 295 kg (650 lb)
- Powerplant: 1 × Kohler K-440 , 33 kW (44 hp)

Performance

- Maximum speed: 130 km/h (80 mph, 70 kn)
- Range: 160 km (100 mi, 87 nmi)
- Service ceiling: 2,800 m (9,000 ft)
- Rate of climb: 2.3 m/s (450 ft/min)

== See also ==
Aircraft of comparable role, configuration, and era

- Avid Champion
- Beaujon Enduro
- Chotia Weedhopper
- Fisher Flyer
- Pterodactyl Ascender
- Ultraflight Lazair
