= Beaujon Enduro =

American ultralight aircraft

Enduro
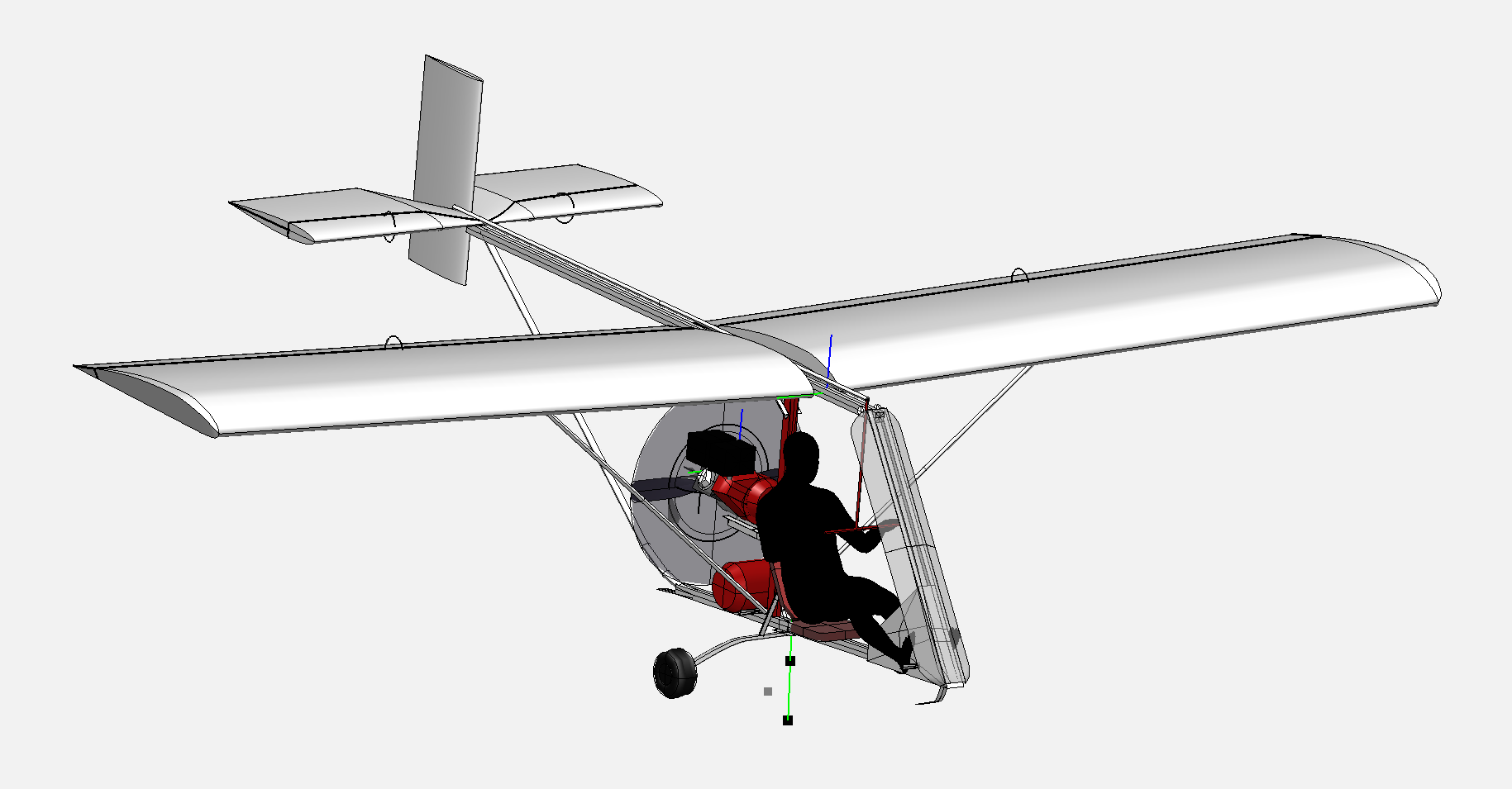

General information
- Type: Ultralight aircraft
- National origin: United States
- Manufacturer: Beaujon Aircraft
- Designer: Herbert Beaujon
- Status: Plans available

History
- Introduction date: 1978
- First flight: 1978

The Beaujon Enduro is a single-seat, American high-wing, pusher configuration ultralight aircraft. The Enduro was introduced in 1978 and remains available as plans from Beaujon Aircraft of Ardmore, Oklahoma.

== Development ==
The Enduro is an early ultralight design that was first developed before the United States ultralight category and its FAR 103 Ultralight Vehicles rules were finalized, but it fits into the requirements including the category's maximum 254 lb (115 kg) empty weight.

With the originally specified 82 lb (37 kg) Briggs & Stratton 401417, four-stroke, 656 cc, 16 hp (12 kW) lawn mower powerplant the aircraft has an empty weight of 230 lb (104 kg). The engine burns only 1 US gal (4 L; 1 imp gal) per hour giving an endurance of 5 hours on the specified 5 US gal (19 L; 4 imp gal) of fuel, hence the aircraft's name.

Reviewer Andre Cliche says of Beaujon's designs that they are "beautifully simple".

== Design ==
The Enduro's wing and tail structure include wooden aircraft-grade spruce spars with polystyrene foam ribs. The constant-chord, wooden-framed wing and the tail surfaces are covered with 1/32 in (1 mm) poplar plywood. The wing is strut-braced.

The tricycle landing gear features a fixed tail skid just behind the cockpit, steel-sprung main-gear suspension and a nose skid. Like many pusher ultralight aircraft the Enduro sits on its tail skid when unoccupied and on its nose skid when a pilot is sitting in the seat. No brakes are specified in the design.

The controls are three-axis, with an overhead-mounted control column. The rudder and ailerons are designed to be interconnected and controlled via the control wheel.

The open frame fuselage consists of 6061T6 aluminum tubing and a single open pilot's seat. The powerplant is installed behind the pilot and above the 5 US gal (19 L; 4 imp gal) fuel tank.

Beaujon Aircraft supplies plans for the Enduro as part of a package which includes plans for eight ultralight craft as well as a 31-page manual.

== Specifications (Enduro) ==
Data from Beaujon

General characteristics

- Crew: one
- Length: 16 ft 7 in (5.06 m)
- Wingspan: 24 ft 6 in (7.47 m)
- Height: 7 ft 0 in (2.14 m)
- Wing area: 102 sq ft (9.49 m^{2})
- Airfoil: Rhodes St. Genese 32
- Empty weight: 230 lb (104 kg)
- Max takeoff weight: 436 lb (197 kg)
- Powerplant: 1 × Briggs & Stratton 401417, four-stroke, 656 cc fixed pitch, 16 hp (12 kW)

Performance

- Maximum speed: 65 mph (105 km/h, 56 kn)
- Cruise speed: 55 mph (89 km/h, 48 kn)
- Stall speed: 26 mph (42 km/h, 23 kn)
- Range: 250 mi (405 km, 220 nmi)
- Rate of climb: 350 ft/min (1.7 m/s)
- Wing loading: 4.2 lb/sq ft (20.8 kg/m^{2})
- Power/mass: 27.3 lb/hp (0.06 kW/kg)

== See also ==
Aircraft of comparable role, configuration, and era

- Aero-Works Aerolite 103
- Avid Champion
- Chotia Gypsy
- Fisher FP-101
- Freebird I
- ISON Airbike
- Pterodactyl Ascender
- Jean St-Germain Raz-Mut
- Ultraflight Lazair
