= Murphy Renegade =

Canadian two-seat biplane design

Renegade
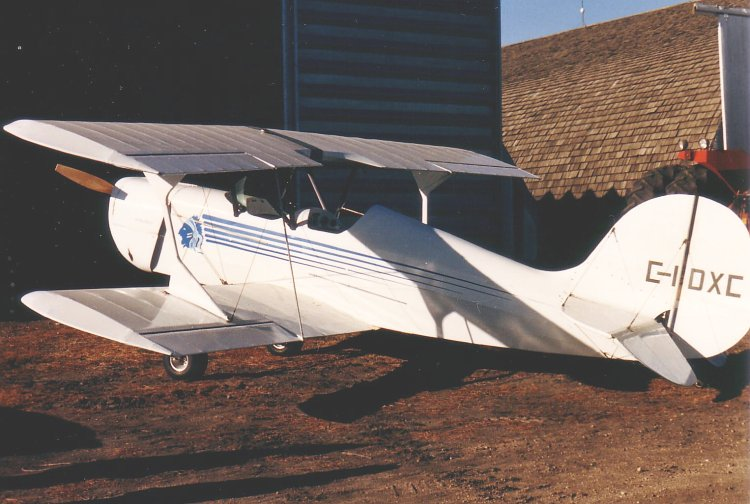
- Renegade II

General information
- Type: Kit aircraft
- National origin: Canada
- Manufacturer: Murphy Aircraft
- Designer: Darryl Murphy
- Number built: 590 (2011)

History
- Manufactured: 1984-present

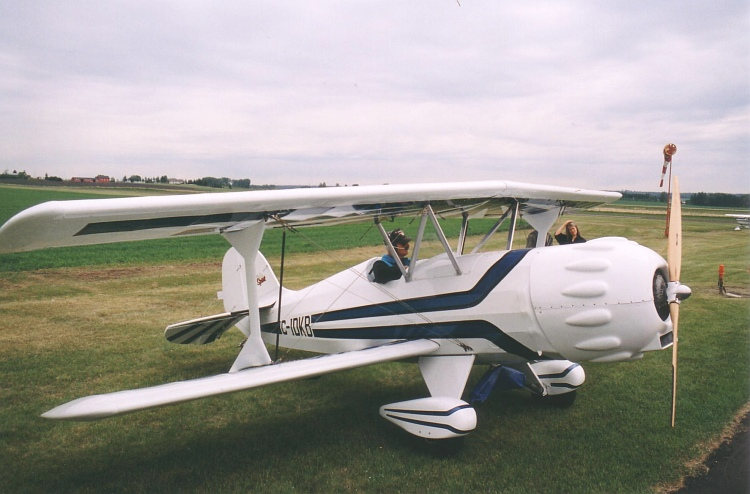
Renegade Spirit with Rotax 618 engine

The Murphy Renegade is a family of Canadian two-seats-in-tandem, single engine, conventional landing gear, biplanes, produced by Murphy Aircraft and intended for amateur construction.

In Canada all Renegade variants are eligible to be registered as amateur-builts, basic ultralights or advanced ultralights. In the USA the Renegade is not on the list of Special light-sport aircraft, but is eligible for the Experimental - Amateur-built category.

== Development ==
The Renegade was designed as the result of an accident. Darryl Murphy is a mechanical engineering technologist who designed and built a rigid wing hang glider in 1978 as a school project while attending the Saskatchewan Institute of Applied Science and Technology in Saskatoon, Saskatchewan. In 1984 Murphy was in a non-aviation accident that left him hospitalized for four months. During his recovery time he decided to design a biplane to fit into the then-new Canadian ultralight category. The resulting aircraft, C-IDJY, is a single-seat model and was intended as a one-off aircraft for his own use, with no production intentions. Murphy named it the Renegade.

After taking the aircraft to a number of fly-ins and other aviation events, Murphy was encouraged by the large number of people who wanted him to build one for them. In 1985 he quit his job and started Murphy Aviation (later renamed Murphy Aircraft Manufacturing), with his brother Bryan and located the company in Chilliwack, British Columbia. The original Renegade design was turned into a two-seater by relocating the fuel tank from the centre fuselage to the upper wing, installing a second seat and designating it Renegade II. Initial sales were disappointing as only one kit was sold in the first six months. Sales improved greatly once the aviation press began reviewing the aircraft. By 1986 the company had a backlog of orders, including many from outside North America. Murphy displayed the Renegade at the EAA Convention, Oshkosh and returned to Chilliwack with a substantial order book. During 1989 sales totalled 129 Renegade IIs.

The Renegade two was initially offered to buyers in six different configurations:

- Plans only
- Partial materials kits
- Full materials kit
- Complete kit, unassembled
- Quick-build kit
- Fully assembled aircraft

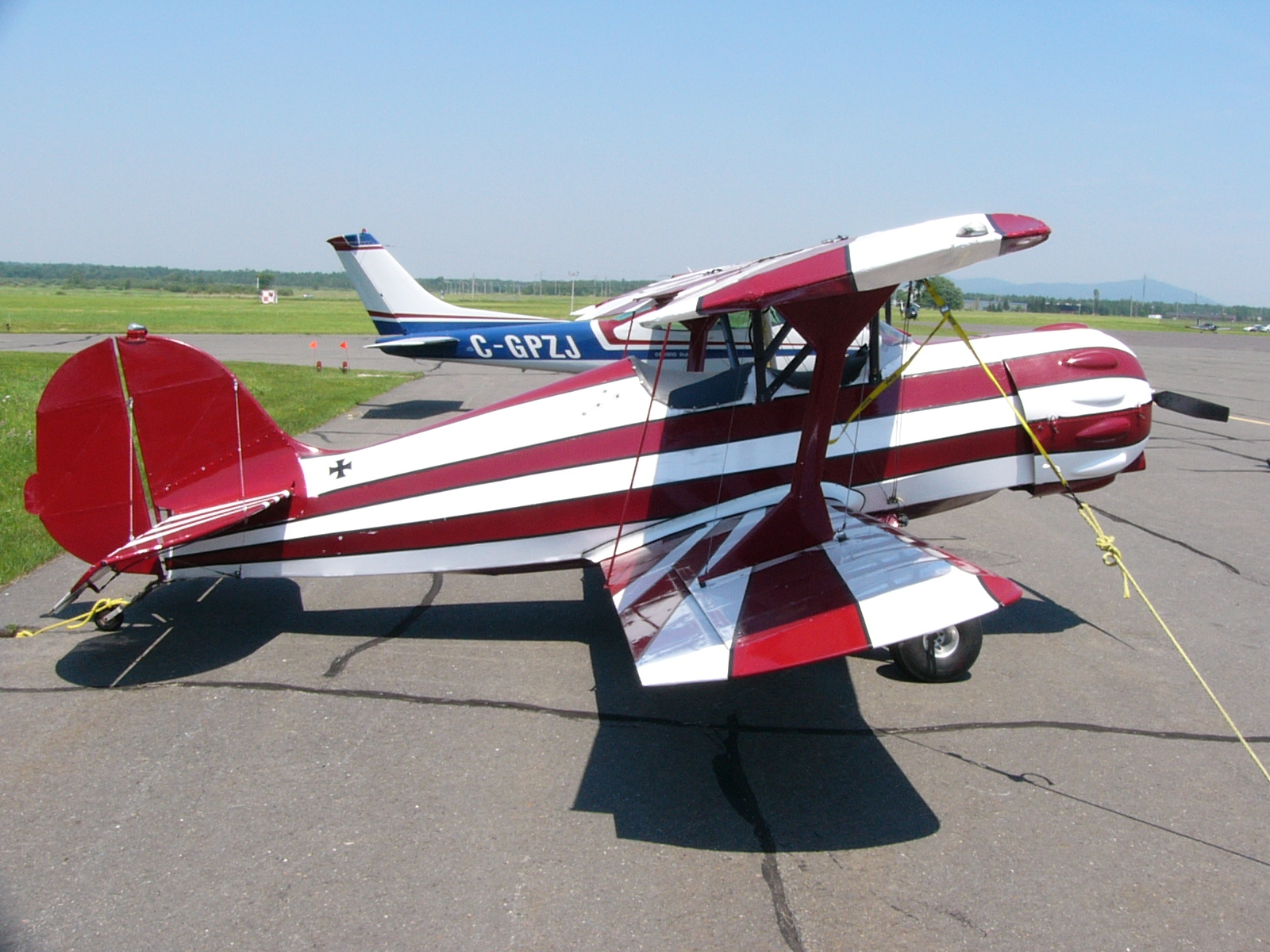
Renegade Spirit

In May 1987 a new version of the basic Renegade design first flew. Named the Renegade Spirit it added a radial engine-style round cowling and additional fuselage stringers to give the aircraft a rounded look. The standard engine was the 64 hp (48 kW) Rotax 532 and later the Rotax 582 of the same output, with the 80 hp (60 kW) four-stroke Rotax 912UL added as a later option. Fibreglass wheel pants are also an option.

== Design ==
The Renegade fuselage is constructed of aluminium square tubing extrusions and fittings, fastened with Avex rivets. The turtle deck and engine cowling are made from fibreglass. The fin, rudder, horizontal stabilizer and elevators are built from aluminum tubing and channel sections. The tail is wire-braced. A manual trim tab mounted on the elevator is an option. The landing gear is of conventional configuration and incorporates bungee suspension. The welded engine mount is 4130 steel.

The Renegades's wings have a positive stagger and incorporate a single faired interplane strut and cabane struts as well as wire-bracing. The top wing has a span of 21 ft (6.4 m) and incorporates a 10 degree sweep to improve visibility from the pilot's back seat, accessibility for the front seat passenger and reduces adverse yaw. The lower wing has 3 degrees of dihedral. Ailerons are of the Friese type, with two ailerons on the lower wing standard and four ailerons optional. The front wing spar was initially a 3 in (7.6 cm) aluminum tube and the rear spar is "C" channel. Starting 1 January 1989 the front spar was changed to a rectangular spar and an outboard drag brace was added, increasing wing rigidity. The ribs are stamped aluminum and mate with an aluminium sheet leading edge. All surfaces are covered with aircraft fabric. Controls are via torque tubes.

The Renegade II wing design was sand-bag tested on 16 February 1988 to 4,050 lb (1,837 kg), or +7.2 g working load, with a +10 and -6 gs ultimate load.

The company indicates that construction time varies between 300–500 hours, depending on builder experience.

== Operational history ==
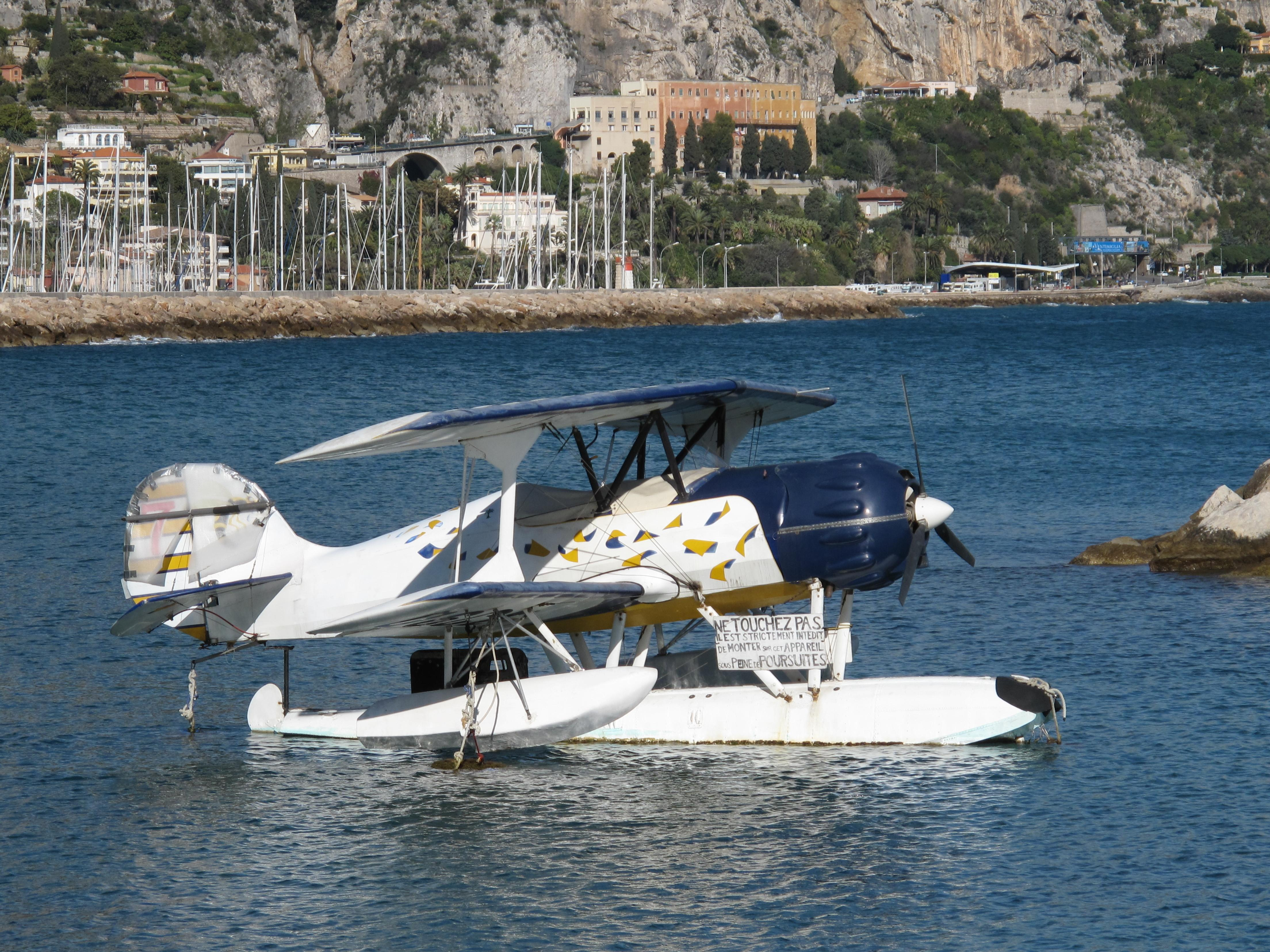
Renegade Spirit on floats

Renegades have been equipped with floats for operations from water.

In his 2015 review Marino Boric said, "the Renegade can take less powerful engines like the Rotax 582, but the higher power of the 912 gives it the sprightly performance it deserves."

== Variants ==
Renegade
Single seat prototype, one built, powered by a 40 hp (30 kW) Rotax 447 powerplant.
Renegade II
Two seat biplane, powered by a 50 hp (37 kW) Rotax 503 or 64 hp (48 kW) Rotax 532.
Renegade Spirit
Two seat biplane with round cowling, powered by a 64 hp (48 kW) Rotax 532 or Rotax 582 or 80 hp (60 kW) four-stroke Rotax 912UL

== Aircraft on display ==
- Kalamazoo Aviation History Museum - Renegade Spirit
- Jeju Aerospace Museum

== Specifications (Renegade II) ==
Data from Kitplanes, Murphy Aircraft and The Incomplete Guide to Airfoil Usage

General characteristics

- Crew: one
- Capacity: one passenger
- Length: 18 ft 5 in (5.61 m)
- Upper wingspan: 21 ft 0 in (6.40 m)
- Lower wingspan: 19 ft 8 in (5.99 m)
- Height: 6 ft 5 in (1.96 m)
- Wing area: 153 sq ft (14.2 m^{2}) (168 sq ft with optional rounded wing tips)
- Airfoil: NACA 23012
- Empty weight: 375 lb (170 kg)
- Gross weight: 850 lb (386 kg)
- Fuel capacity: 14 US gallons (53 L)
- Powerplant: 1 × Rotax 503 two cylinder, two-stroke aircraft engine, 50 hp (37 kW)
- Propellers: 2-bladed ground adjustable

Performance

- Maximum speed: 85 mph (137 km/h, 74 kn)
- Cruise speed: 75 mph (121 km/h, 65 kn)
- Stall speed: 36 mph (58 km/h, 31 kn)
- Never exceed speed: 120 mph (190 km/h, 100 kn)
- Range: 282 mi (454 km, 245 nmi)
- g limits: +10/-6 (ultimate)
- Rate of climb: 700 ft/min (3.6 m/s)

== See also ==
Aircraft of comparable role, configuration, and era

- Fisher Classic
- Fisher FP-404
- Fisher R-80 Tiger Moth
- Fisher Youngster
- RagWing RW2 Special I
- Sorrell Hiperlight
