= Fisher FP-404 =

Canadian homebuilt light aircraft

FP-404
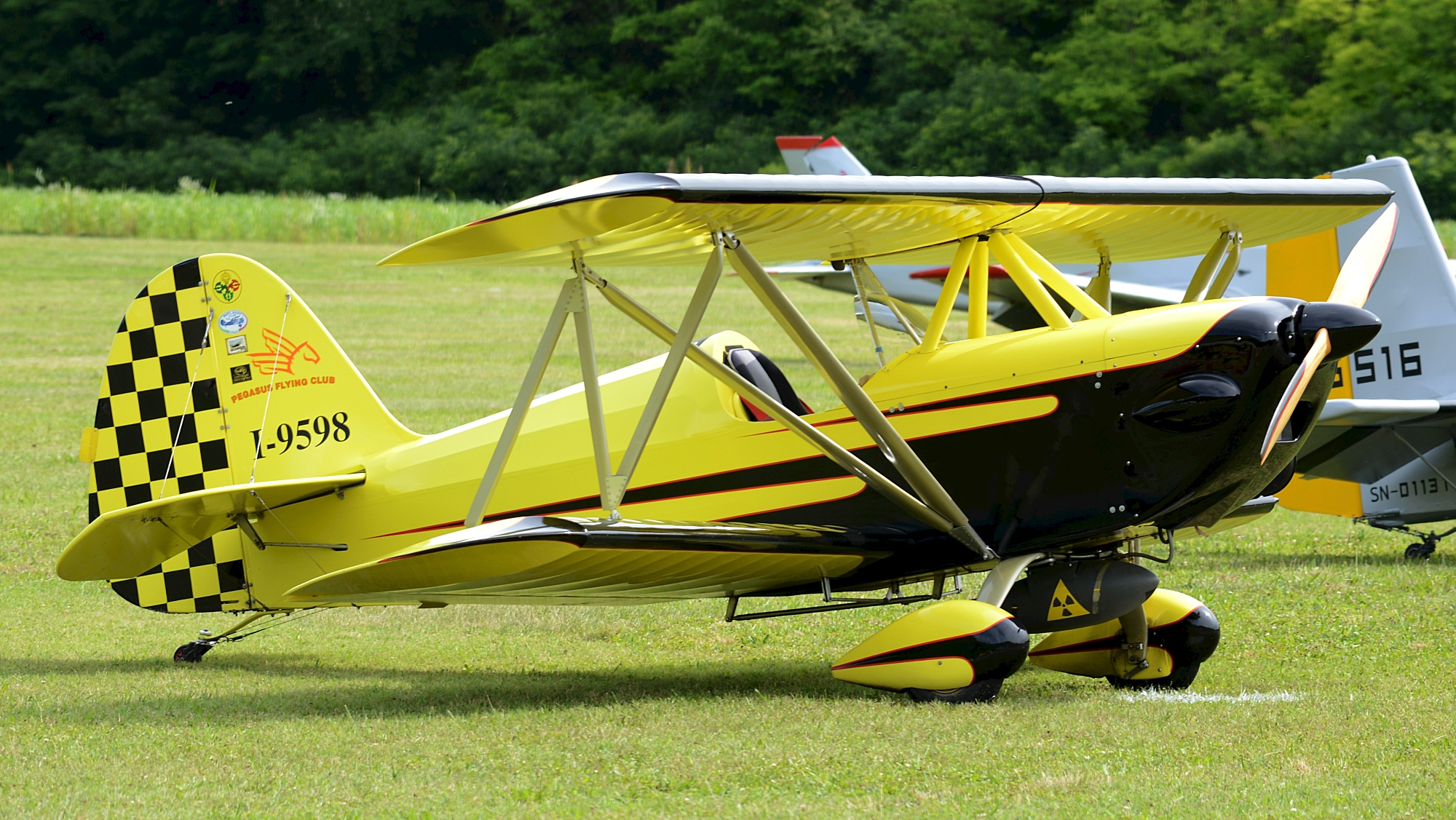

General information
- Type: Kit aircraft
- National origin: Canada
- Manufacturer: Fisher Flying Products
- Number built: 355 (2011)

History
- Introduction date: 1984
- First flight: 1984

The Fisher FP-404 is a Canadian single-seat, conventional landing gear, single-engined biplane kit aircraft designed for construction by amateur builders. Fisher Flying Products was originally based in Edgeley, North Dakota, USA but the company is now located in Woodbridge, Ontario, Canada.

== Development ==
The FP-404 was designed by Fisher Aircraft in the United States in 1984 and was the company's first design that was too heavy for the US FAR 103 Ultralight Vehicles category, with the category's maximum 254 lb (115 kg) empty weight. The 404's standard empty weight is 275 lb (125 kg) when equipped with a two-stroke 50 hp (37 kW) Rotax 503 engine, putting it into the US experimental-amateur-built category, although it qualifies as an ultralight in other countries, such as Canada. The design goal was to provide a nostalgic aircraft reminiscent of the biplanes of the 1930s, as the company explains "The FP-404 represents a reborn era in airborne adventure. This bi-plane aircraft is a throw-back to seat-of-the-pants flying, complete with minimal instruments and bare-necessity controls."

The construction of the FP-404 is similar to the Fisher FP-202 Koala. The aircraft's structure is entirely made from wood, with the wooden fuselage built from wood strips arranged in a geodesic form, resulting in a very strong and light aircraft with redundant load paths. Both the wings and fuselage are covered with doped aircraft fabric. The wings are strut-braced with both interplane struts and cabane struts. The aircraft has no flaps. The company claims it takes an amateur builder 500 hours to build the FP-404, "using normal household tools".

Early versions of the FP-404 were equipped with the 28 hp (21 kW) Rotax 277 in an attempt to keep the aircraft under the US FAR 103 Ultralight Vehicles weight limit but the aircraft was found to be under-powered due to its short wing span and high-drag configuration. Heavier engines, like the 40 hp (30 kW) Rotax 447 and 50 hp (37 kW) Rotax 503 engines provided adequate power but put the 404 over the category weight limit. These models were designated as the Fisher 404 EXP to show that they would not qualify for the FAR 103 weight limit.

By late 2004 over 350 FP-404s were flying.

Reviewer Andre Cliche said about the design:

The forward view from the cockpit is not the best as it is restricted by the wings and cabane struts. The wing span is very short at 18’. This translates into superb maneuverability and almost non—existent adverse yaw. On the other hand, the short span means that the FP-404 needs more power to sustain altitude and has a relatively high stall speed.

== Variants ==
FP-404
Single-seat, single-engined biplane, initial version equipped with a 28 hp (21 kW) Rotax 277 powerplant for the FAR 103 Ultralight Vehicles category
FP-404 EXP
Single-seat, single-engined biplane, later version equipped with a 40 hp (30 kW) Rotax 447 or 50 hp (37 kW) Rotax 503 powerplant for the US experimental-amateur-built category

== Specifications (FP-404 EXP) ==
Data from Company website, Kitplanes and Cliche

General characteristics

- Crew: one
- Capacity: 265 lb (120 kg), no passengers
- Length: 14 ft 6 in (4.42 m)
- Wingspan: 18 ft 0 in (5.49 m)
- Height: 5 ft 5 in (1.65 m)
- Wing area: 120 sq ft (11.16 m^{2})
- Empty weight: 275 lb (125 kg)
- Max takeoff weight: 540 lb (245 kg)
- Powerplant: 1 × Rotax 503 Twin cylinder, two-stroke piston engine, 50 hp (37 kW)

Performance

- Cruise speed: 72 mph (117 km/h, 63 kn)
- Stall speed: 30 mph (49 km/h, 26 kn)
- Never exceed speed: 90 mph (146 km/h, 78 kn)
- Rate of climb: 800 ft/min (4.1 m/s)
- Wing loading: 4.5 lb/sq ft (21.95 kg/m^{2})
- Power/mass: 10.8 lb/hp (0.15 kW/kg)

== See also ==
Aircraft of comparable role, configuration, and era

- Murphy Renegade
- RagWing RW2 Special I
- Sorrell Hiperlight
- Stolp Starduster Too
