= Edgeley, North Dakota =

- City
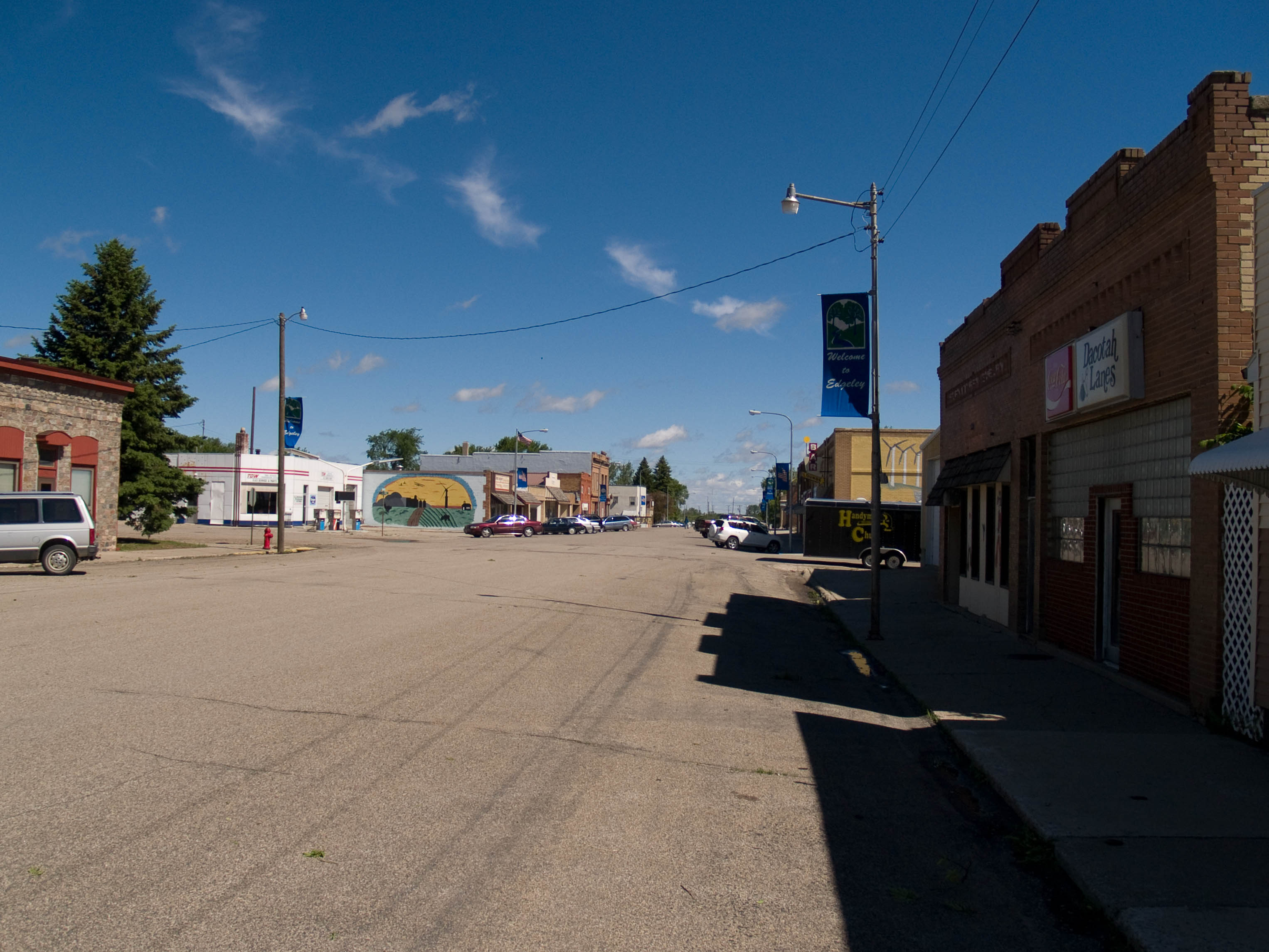
- Business district in Edgeley
- Motto: "Gateway To Wind Energy"
- Location of Edgeley, North Dakota
- Coordinates: 46°21′34″N 98°42′44″W
- Country: United States
- State: North Dakota
- County: LaMoure
- Founded: 1886

Area
  - Total: 0.75 sq mi (1.94 km^{2})
  - Land: 0.75 sq mi (1.94 km^{2})
  - Water: 0 sq mi (0.00 km^{2})
- Elevation: 1,565 ft (477 m)

Population (2020)
  - Total: 585
  - Estimate (2022): 576
  - Density: 781.5/sq mi (301.74/km^{2})
- Time zone: UTC-6 (Central (CST))
  - Summer (DST): UTC-5 (CDT)
- ZIP code: 58433
- Area code: 701
- FIPS code: 38-22140
- GNIS feature ID: 1033639
- Website: edgeley.com

Edgeley is a city in LaMoure County, North Dakota, United States. The population was 585 at the 2020 census.

== History ==
Edgeley was founded in 1886 by Richard Sykes, a landowner from England who named it after Edgeley, Cheshire, where he was born.

== Geography ==
Edgeley is located at 46°21′34″N 98°42′44″W (46.359415, -98.712201).

According to the United States Census Bureau, the city has a total area of 0.75 square miles (1.94 km^{2}), all land.

== Demographics ==
Historical population
Census	Pop.	Note	%±
1900	306		—
1910	749		144.8%
1920	803		7.2%
1930	821		2.2%
1940	803		−2.2%
1950	943		17.4%
1960	992		5.2%
1970	888		−10.5%
1980	843		−5.1%
1990	680		−19.3%
2000	637		−6.3%
2010	563		−11.6%
2020	585		3.9%
2022 (est.)	576		−1.5%
U.S. Decennial Census; 2020 Census

Edgeley offers modern recreational facilities, an excellent school system and a full service business district. Edgeley Public School educates preschool thru 12th grade students. It enrolls between 200 and 300 kids yearly.

=== 2010 census ===
As of the census of 2010, there were 563 people, 262 households, and 161 families residing in the city. The population density was 750.7 inhabitants per square mile (289.8/km^{2}). There were 313 housing units at an average density of 417.3 per square mile (161.1/km^{2}). The racial makeup of the city was 99.5% White, 0.2% Asian, 0.2% from other races, and 0.2% from two or more races. Hispanic or Latino of any race were 1.2% of the population.

There were 262 households, of which 22.5% had children under the age of 18 living with them, 50.0% were married couples living together, 8.0% had a female householder with no husband present, 3.4% had a male householder with no wife present, and 38.5% were non-families. 37.0% of all households were made up of individuals, and 19.8% had someone living alone who was 65 years of age or older. The average household size was 2.06 and the average family size was 2.67.

The median age in the city was 51.3 years. 20.1% of residents were under the age of 18; 3.5% were between the ages of 18 and 24; 14.7% were from 25 to 44; 32.8% were from 45 to 64; and 28.8% were 65 years of age or older. The gender makeup of the city was 48.8% male and 51.2% female.

=== 2000 census ===
As of the census of 2000, there were 637 people, 293 households, and 162 families residing in the city. The population density was 870.1 inhabitants per square mile (335.9/km^{2}). There were 336 housing units at an average density of 458.9 per square mile (177.2/km^{2}). The racial makeup of the city was 99.37% White, and 0.63% from two or more races. Hispanic or Latino of any race were 0.63% of the population.

There were 293 households, out of which 24.6% had children under the age of 18 living with them, 50.2% were married couples living together, 4.4% had a female householder with no husband present, and 44.4% were non-families. 43.0% of all households were made up of individuals, and 26.3% had someone living alone who was 65 years of age or older. The average household size was 2.07 and the average family size was 2.89.

In the city, the population was spread out, with 21.7% under the age of 18, 3.6% from 18 to 24, 21.4% from 25 to 44, 23.1% from 45 to 64, and 30.3% who were 65 years of age or older. The median age was 47 years. For every 100 females, there were 85.7 males. For every 100 females age 18 and over, there were 85.5 males.

The median income for a household in the city was $29,000, and the median income for a family was $37,375. Males had a median income of $30,735 versus $17,115 for females. The per capita income for the city was $21,570. About 1.8% of families and 3.6% of the population were below the poverty line, including 2.2% of those under age 18 and 6.7% of those age 65 or over.

== Notable people ==
- Tim Mathern, served in the North Dakota Senate since 1987, grew up in Edgeley
- Glenn Truesdell, served in the Minnesota House of Representatives 1959–1960, was born in Edgeley.
- Science fiction artist John Berkey was born in Edgeley in 1932.

== Climate ==
This climatic region is typified by large seasonal temperature differences, with warm to hot (and often humid) summers and cold (sometimes severely cold) winters. According to the Köppen Climate Classification system, Edgeley has a humid continental climate, abbreviated "Dfb" on climate maps.

Climate data for Edgeley 3WNW, North Dakota (1991–2020 normals, extremes 1901–present)
Month	Jan	Feb	Mar	Apr	May	Jun	Jul	Aug	Sep	Oct	Nov	Dec	Year
Record high °F (°C)	58 (14)	67 (19)	86 (30)	92 (33)	108 (42)	106 (41)	116 (47)	109 (43)	105 (41)	94 (34)	77 (25)	67 (19)	116 (47)
Mean daily maximum °F (°C)	19.9 (−6.7)	25.2 (−3.8)	37.1 (2.8)	53.2 (11.8)	66.7 (19.3)	75.7 (24.3)	81.0 (27.2)	80.2 (26.8)	71.4 (21.9)	55.9 (13.3)	38.9 (3.8)	25.5 (−3.6)	52.6 (11.4)
Daily mean °F (°C)	11.8 (−11.2)	16.1 (−8.8)	28.1 (−2.2)	42.4 (5.8)	55.5 (13.1)	65.3 (18.5)	70.1 (21.2)	68.5 (20.3)	59.4 (15.2)	45.3 (7.4)	30.0 (−1.1)	17.6 (−8.0)	42.5 (5.8)
Mean daily minimum °F (°C)	3.7 (−15.7)	7.0 (−13.9)	19.2 (−7.1)	31.6 (−0.2)	44.3 (6.8)	55.0 (12.8)	59.1 (15.1)	56.7 (13.7)	47.4 (8.6)	34.7 (1.5)	21.0 (−6.1)	9.7 (−12.4)	32.4 (0.2)
Record low °F (°C)	−41 (−41)	−39 (−39)	−26 (−32)	−7 (−22)	11 (−12)	26 (−3)	33 (1)	31 (−1)	14 (−10)	−6 (−21)	−27 (−33)	−36 (−38)	−41 (−41)
Average precipitation inches (mm)	0.61 (15)	0.41 (10)	0.92 (23)	1.43 (36)	3.03 (77)	3.35 (85)	3.28 (83)	2.79 (71)	2.50 (64)	1.71 (43)	0.66 (17)	0.46 (12)	21.15 (537)
Average precipitation days (≥ 0.01 in)	3.8	3.1	3.6	4.3	7.1	7.2	6.6	5.4	4.3	4.3	3.2	2.8	55.7
Source: NOAA
