= Carlson Sparrow =

Family of American single engine, ultralight aircraft

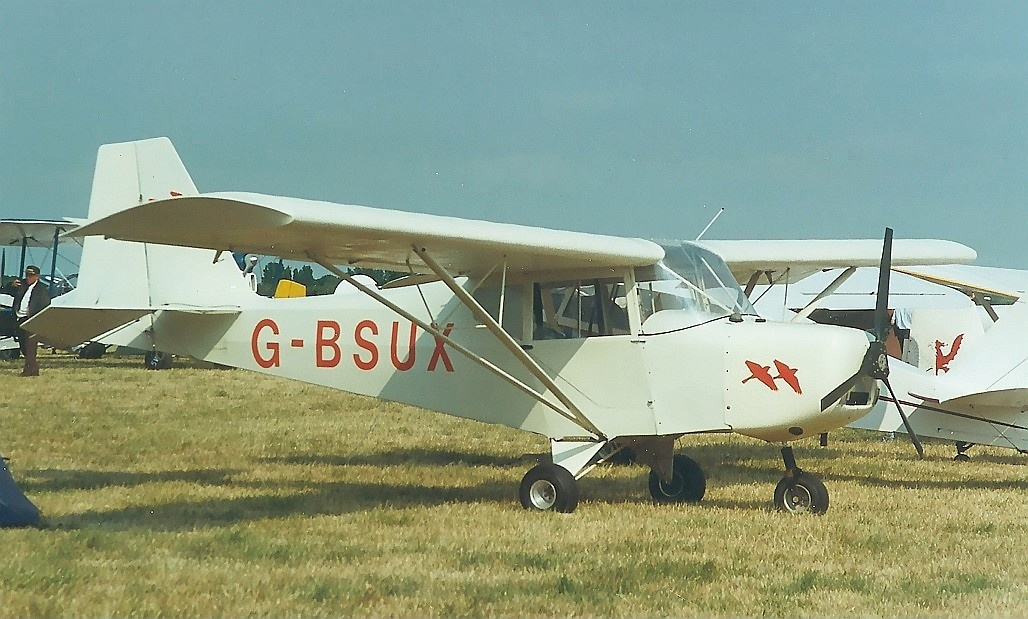

General information
- Type: Ultralight aircraft
- National origin: United States
- Manufacturer: Carlson Aircraft; Skyline Technologies
- Designer: Ernst W. Carlson
- Status: Out of production

History
- Introduction date: 1987
- First flight: 1987

The Carlson Sparrow is a family of American, high wing, strut-braced, single engine, ultralight aircraft that was designed by Ernst W. Carlson and produced by Carlson Aircraft of East Palestine, Ohio and later Skyline Technologies of Salem, Ohio for amateur construction.

== Design and development ==
First flown in 1987, the original Sparrow Ultralight is a single seater designed as an FAR 103 Ultralight Vehicles compliant aircraft with an empty weight within that category's 254 lb (115 kg) empty weight limit, when equipped with a light enough engine. The Sparrow can also be built in the US homebuilt and light-sport aircraft categories.

The aircraft has a 4130 steel tube frame fuselage and a wing constructed with dual aluminium I-beam spars, with stamped aluminum wing ribs, all covered in doped fabric. The wings are supported by V-struts and jury struts. The landing gear is bungee suspended. The Sparrow has a fully enclosed cockpit design, allowing flying in cooler weather. The Sparrow was available as a kit that includes a pre-welded fuselage and quick-build wings. The power range is 20 to 50 hp (15 to 37 kW) and the original standard engine specified was the 28 hp (21 kW) Rotax 277 with the 50 hp (37 kW) Rotax 503 as an option, although the additional weight puts the aircraft in the US homebuilt category. Other lightweight engines employed include the 22 hp (16 kW) Zenoah G-25 and the 20 hp (15 kW) 2si 215.

The Sparrow can be equipped with skis for winter operations. Construction times from the kit are reported to be 400–500 hours.

The design was named Grand Champion at EAA AirVenture Oshkosh upon its introduction in 1987.

== Variants ==
Sparrow Ultralight
Original single seat, high wing, US FAR Part 103 ultralight, with tricycle or conventional landing gear, powered by a 28 hp (21 kW) Rotax 277 or homebuilt aircraft powered by 45 hp (34 kW) Rotax 503 engine. About 100 were reported flying in 2001. Production completed.
Sparrow II
Two seat side-by-side seating, high wing, US homebuilt development of the single seat Sparrow UL, with tricycle gear and an optional folding wing for transport or storage, powered by a 64 hp (48 kW) Rotax 582. Empty weight of 510 lb (231 kg) and gross weight 1,050 lb (476 kg). 60 were reported flying in 2004. Production completed.
Sparrow Sport Special
Single seat, high wing, US homebuilt, with conventional landing gear, powered by a 50 hp (37 kW) Rotax 503. Empty weight of 360 lb (163 kg) and gross weight 710 lb (322 kg). 37 were reported flying in 2007. Production completed.
Sparrow II XTC
Two seat side-by-side seating with dual controls, high wing, US homebuilt, higher-powered development of the Sparrow II, with tricycle gear, powered by an 82 hp (61 kW) Subaru EA-81, 85 hp (63 kW) Continental C-85 or 80 hp (60 kW) Rotax 912UL. The fastest Sparrow with a cruise of 110 mph (177 km/h). Empty weight of 600 lb (272 kg) and gross weight 1,250 lb (567 kg). 34 were reported flying in 2007. Production completed.

== Specifications (Sparrow Ultralight) ==
Data from Cliche and Kitplanes

General characteristics

- Crew: one
- Length: 16 ft 9 in (5.11 m)
- Wingspan: 30 ft 3 in (9.22 m)
- Height: 6 ft 9 in (2.06 m)
- Wing area: 120 sq ft (11 m^{2})
- Empty weight: 254 lb (115 kg)
- Gross weight: 504 lb (229 kg)
- Fuel capacity: 5 US gallons (19 litres)
- Powerplant: 1 × Rotax 277 , 28 hp (21 kW)
- Propellers: 2-bladed wooden

Performance

- Maximum speed: 63 mph (101 km/h, 55 kn)
- Cruise speed: 58 mph (93 km/h, 50 kn)
- Stall speed: 27 mph (43 km/h, 23 kn)
- Range: 230 mi (370 km, 200 nmi)
- Service ceiling: 10,000 ft (3,000 m)
- g limits: +5/-3
- Rate of climb: 700 ft/min (3.6 m/s)

== See also ==
Aircraft of comparable role, configuration, and era

- Avid Champion
- Denney Kitfox
- Ultravia Pelican
- RANS S-4 Coyote
- RANS S-5 Coyote
- Rocky Mountain Wings Ridge Runner
- Preceptor N3 Pup
- Hipp's Superbirds J-3 Kitten (Preceptor Pup is designed by a former Hipps worker)
- Belite Ultra Cub
- Anglin J6 Karatoo
- Norman Aviation J6 Karatoo
- Wood Sky Pup
- Team Mini-Max Hi-MAX
- Fisher FP-202 Koala
- Light Miniature Aircraft LM-1
