= Flying K Sky Raider =

Family of ultralight aircraft

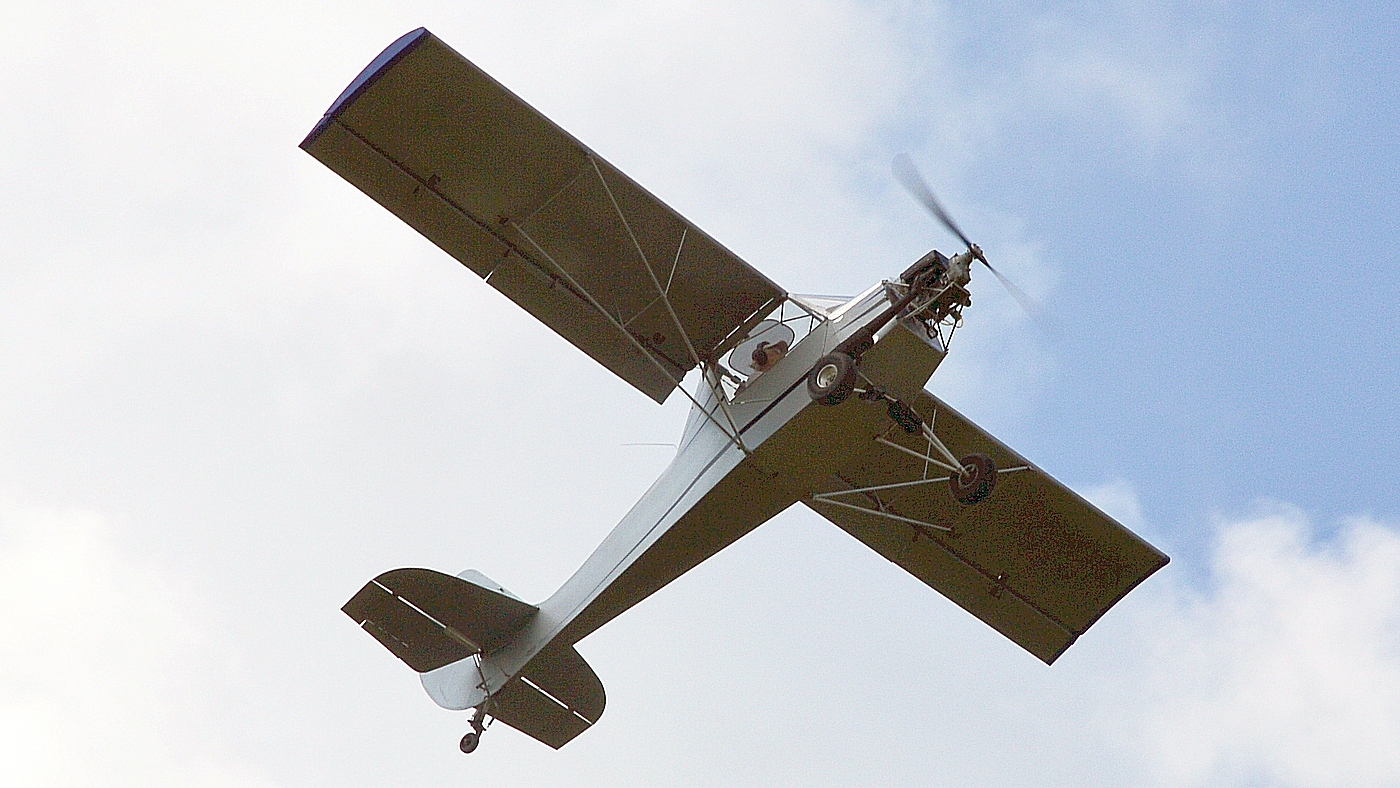

General information
- Type: Ultralight aircraft
- National origin: United States
- Manufacturer: Flying K Enterprises; Sky Raider LLC
- Designer: Ken Schrader
- Status: In production (2015)
- Number built: 50 (Sky Raider 2007)

History
- First flight: 1996
- Developed from: Denney Kitfox

The Flying K Sky Raider is a family of American, high wing, strut-braced, single engine, conventional landing gear ultralight aircraft that was designed by Ken Schrader and produced by Flying K Enterprises and later Sky Raider LLC of Caldwell, Idaho for amateur construction.

== Design and development ==
First flown in 1996, the original Sky Raider is a single seater designed as an FAR 103 Ultralight Vehicles compliant aircraft with an empty weight within that category's 254 lb (115 kg) empty weight limit, when equipped with a light enough engine. The Sky Raider can also be built in the US homebuilt and light-sport aircraft categories and in the United Kingdom as a BCAR Section S microlight. The design was developed from the Avid Flyer and the Denney Kitfox and the designer formerly worked for both those companies.

The aircraft has a 4130 steel tube frame fuselage and a wing constructed from aluminium tubing, all covered in doped fabric. The wings are equipped with slotted-style flaps and fold for transport or storage without a requirement to disconnect the flaps and ailerons. The landing gear is bungee suspended. The Sky Raider has a fully enclosed cockpit design, allowing flying in cooler weather. The Sky Raider is available as a kit, including quick-build options, including a pre-welded fuselage and quick-build wings. The power range is 28 to 50 hp (21 to 37 kW) and original standard engine specified was the 28 hp (21 kW) Rotax 277 with the 40 hp (30 kW) Rotax 447 as an optional, although the additional weight would probably put the aircraft in the US homebuilt category.

The Sky Raider can be equipped with floats and skis.

== Variants ==
Sky Raider
Original single seat high wing US FAR Part 103 ultralight powered by a 28 hp (21 kW) Rotax 277 or homebuilt powered by 40 hp (30 kW) Rotax 447 engine. Production completed
Sky Raider II
Stretched version with two seats in tandem, a gross weight of 950 lb (431 kg), an acceptable power range of 60 to 80 hp (45 to 60 kW). Engines used include the two-stroke 50 hp (37 kW) Rotax 503 and the four-stroke 60 hp (45 kW) HKS 700E engine. Described as an "intimate tandem two seater" due to the small rear seat space. Production completed.
Super Sky Raider
Two seats in tandem, a gross weight of 1,050 lb (476 kg), an acceptable power range of 50 to 80 hp (37 to 60 kW). Engines used include the 80 hp (60 kW) Jabiru 2200 engine. In production, with fifty completed and flying by 2011.
Frontier
Two seats in tandem, a gross weight of 1,600 lb (726 kg) and floats as an option. Engines used include the 130 hp (97 kW) Lycoming O-290 engine and the 85 hp (63 kW) Jabiru 2200. Floats are optional. In production, with two completed and flying by 2011, the construction time is estimated at 300–400 hours.

== Specifications (Sky Raider) ==
Data from Cliche and Kitplanes

General characteristics

- Crew: one
- Length: 17 ft 0 in (5.18 m)
- Wingspan: 26 ft 3 in (8.00 m)
- Wing area: 110 sq ft (10 m^{2})
- Empty weight: 240 lb (109 kg)
- Gross weight: 500 lb (227 kg)
- Fuel capacity: 5 US gallons (19 litres)
- Powerplant: 1 × Rotax 277 , 28 hp (21 kW)
- Propellers: 2-bladed wooden

Performance

- Maximum speed: 63 mph (101 km/h, 55 kn)
- Cruise speed: 60 mph (97 km/h, 52 kn)
- Stall speed: 23 mph (37 km/h, 20 kn)
- Range: 120 mi (190 km, 100 nmi)
- Service ceiling: 11,000 ft (3,400 m)
- Rate of climb: 450 ft/min (2.3 m/s)

== See also ==
Related development

- Denney Kitfox
- Rocky Mountain Wings Ridge Runner

Aircraft of comparable role, configuration, and era

- Anglin J6 Karatoo
- Avid Champion
- Carlson Sparrow
- Hipp's Superbirds J-3 Kitten
- Preceptor N3 Pup
- Ultravia Pelican
- Wood Sky Pup
