= Kalkaska City Airport =

Public use airport in Kalkasa, Michigan

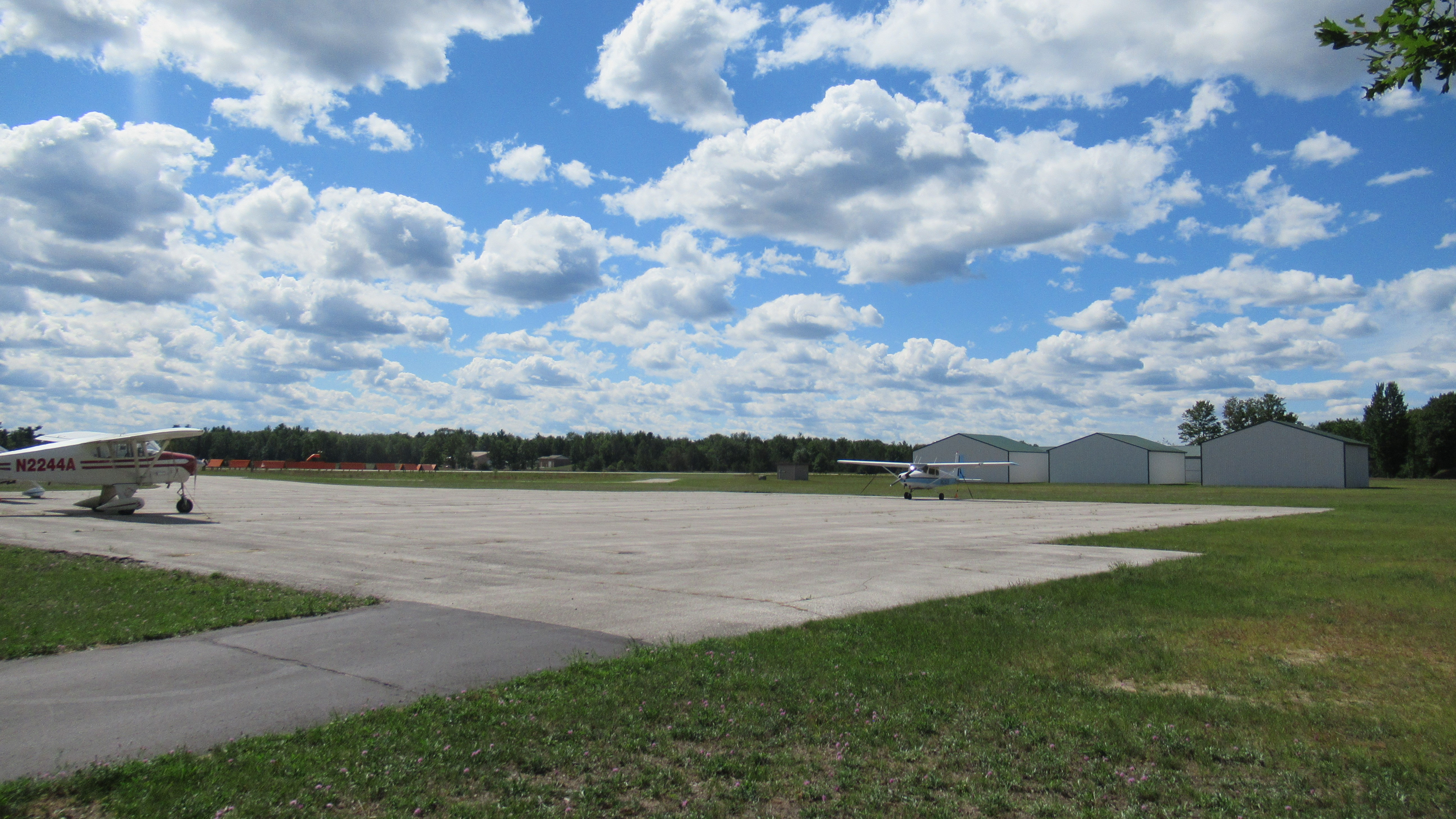
- IATA: none; ICAO: none; FAA LID: Y89

Summary
- Owner/Operator: Village of Kalkaska
- Serves: Kalkaska, Michigan
- Location: Kalkaska County, Michigan
- Time zone: UTC−05:00 (-5)
  - Summer (DST): UTC−04:00 (-4)
- Elevation AMSL: 1,030 ft (310 m)
- Coordinates: 44°43′30″N 085°12′07″W
- Interactive map of Kalkaska City Airport

Runways
Direction	Length		Surface
Direction	ft	m	Surface
10/28	3,500	1,067	Asphalt

Statistics (2019)
- Aircraft Movements: 2652

Kalkaska City Airport (FAA LID: Y89) is a publicly owned, public-use airport located one mile (1.6 km) southwest of Kalkaska in Kalkaska County, Michigan. The airport sits on 160 acres (65 ha) at an elevation of 1,030 feet (314 m).

The airport is the starting point for the Iceman Cometh Challenge bike race, the largest single-day point-to-point bike race in the country. Racers start at Kalkaska Airport, and it takes competitors to Timber Ridge in nearby Traverse City. It is also home to Kalkaska's National Trout Festival as well as a WinterFest.

The airport often sees coast guard training missions from the base at the U.S. Coast Guard Air Station Traverse City. Training missions are often open to the public so that community residents can observe the operations and interact with crewmembers and aircraft.

== Facilities and aircraft ==
The airport has one runway, designated as runway 10/28. It measures 3,500 by 75 feet (1,067 m × 23 m) and is paved with asphalt. For the 12-month period ending December 31, 2019, the airport had 2,652 airport operations per year, an average of 51 per week. It was entirely general aviation. For the same time period, there are five aircraft based at the airport, all single-engine airplanes.

The airport does not have a fixed-base operator, and no fuel is available.

== Accidents and incidents ==
- On December 6, 2008, a Cessna 206 crashed near the airport while trying to land in a snow storm. The instrument-rated pilot originally attempted to land at Cherry Capital Airport in Traverse City but could not see the runway while on the instrument approach. The aircraft disappeared from radar and reappeared near Kalkaska, where the aircraft soon after crashed.
- On April 27, 2018, an experimental amateur-built Kitfox V crashed south of the airport. Witnesses reported the aircraft entered a spin before impact.

== See also ==
- List of airports in Michigan
