= Thor 1 =

Thor 1 may refer to:

- Thor 1-A, a version of the Thor T/A ultralight aircraft
- Thor 1 or Marcopolo 2, a satellite in the Thor family of satellites

== See also ==
- Thor (film), a 2011 American superhero film
- Thor (disambiguation)
