= Toucan (disambiguation) =

A Toucan is a brightly marked tropical bird with a colorful bill.

Toucan may also refer to:

- Aero Adventure Toucan, an American home built aircraft design
- Canaero Toucan ultralight aircraft
- Toucan crossing, a road crossing for pedestrians and cyclists in the UK
- USS Toucan, an American minesweeper

== See also ==
- Tucana, a constellation in the southern sky
- EMBRAER Tucano, a Brazilian military trainer aircraft
- Short Tucano, a British military trainer aircraft
- Tucan, member of Superorganism (band)
- Tougan, town in Burkina Faso.
