= Bagalini Bagaliante =

Italian motorglider

Bagaliante

General information
- Type: Motor glider
- National origin: Italy
- Designer: Marino Bagalini

The Bagalini Bagaliante (a portmanteau of "Bagalini" and "Glider") is an Italian high-wing, strut-braced, single-seat, pusher configuration, conventional landing gear motor glider that was designed by Marino Bagalini and made available as plans for amateur construction.

== Design and development ==
The Bagaliante is constructed from wood and metal and is of pod-and-boom layout.

The 12.2 m (40.0 ft) span wing employs a Göttingen 535 airfoil at the wing root, transitioning to an NACA 4412 section at the wingtip. The wing uses a semi-tapered planform, tapering outboard of the mid-span point. The specified engine is a 19 kW (25 hp) Rotax 277 two-stroke aircraft engine, mounted aft of the cockpit and driving a pusher propeller mounted above the tail boom. The fixed mainwheels are located beside the fuselage on small sponsons.

Even with the small Rotax 277 fitted, the takeoff and landing distance is 46 m (150.9 ft)

The estimated time to build the aircraft from the plans is 700 hours.

== Specifications (Bagaliante) ==
Data from Purdy

General characteristics

- Crew: one
- Length: 6.40 m (21.00 ft)
- Wingspan: 12.2 m (40 ft 0 in)
- Airfoil: root: Gottingen 535, tip: NACA 4412
- Empty weight: 110 kg (242 lb)
- Gross weight: 185 kg (407 lb)
- Fuel capacity: 11 litres (2.9 US gal)
- Powerplant: 1 × Rotax 277 , 19 kW (26 hp)
- Propellers: 2-bladed wooden

Performance

- Maximum speed: 87 km/h (54 mph, 47 kn)
- Cruise speed: 60 km/h (37 mph, 32 kn)
- Stall speed: 42 km/h (26 mph, 23 kn)
- Rate of climb: 4.6 m/s (900 ft/min)

== See also ==
- List of gliders
