= Piccard Eureka =

Eureka

General information
- Type: Single seat ultralight
- National origin: Switzerland
- Designer: Bertrand Piccard
- Number built: 1

History
- First flight: c.1984

The Swiss Piccard Eureka was designed to be an easily transportable single seat three-axis ultralight. Its development was brought to a halt by the Swiss ban on ultralight aircraft in 1984.

== Design and development ==
The Eureka was a small but conventionally laid out tractor configuration low-mid wing monoplane with an open cockpit and cruciform tail. It was formed from aluminium tubing with fabric covering. The wings were approximately semi-elliptical in plan and wire braced from above and below, with straight, unswept leading edges and curved trailing edges. The 2.05 m (6 ft 9 in) root chord reduced to pointed tips. Roll was controlled with wing warping from a conventional control column.

A 20 kW (27 hp) Rotax 277 single cylinder two-stroke engine in the nose at wing height drove a two-blade propeller, with the cockpit immediately behind. The pilot had a windscreen and behind him the seat back was faired into the short, thin fuselage section between the wing trailing edge and the tail. The vertical tail was kite shaped, with the longer triangular section above the wing and with the rest forming a short ventral fin. The whole rear section was hinged as a conventional rudder. The horizontal surfaces were each triangular and mounted on the fuselage, with the rear sections forming elevators.

The Eureka had a conventional fixed tail wheel undercarriage, with rubber suspended mainwheels on individual pairs of V-struts and linked by a cross axle. The tail wheel was held below the ventral fin on a long rearward strut from the fuselage. With wings and tail folded, the Eureka could be transported on the luggage rack of a medium-sized saloon car.

The Eureka was first flown in the early 1980s but its testing development ended when the Swiss government completely banned ultralight flying on the basis of noise pollution. This ban on ultralights was not lifted until 2005. Only one Eureka was ever built.

== Specifications ==
Data from Berger and Burr

General characteristics

- Wingspan: 7.30 m (23 ft 11 in)
- Wing area: 10.7 m^{2} (115 sq ft)
- Aspect ratio: 5.0
- Airfoil: NACA 23015 modified
- Empty weight: 98 kg (216 lb)
- Max takeoff weight: 218 kg (481 lb)
- Fuel capacity: 10.0 L (2.2 Imp gal, 2.6 US gal)
- Powerplant: 1 × Rotax 277 single cylinder air-cooled two stroke, with maximum power at 6,200 rpm, 20 kW (27 hp)
- Propellers: 2-bladed geared down 2.6:1, 1.4 m (4 ft 7 in) diameter

Performance

- Maximum speed: 109 km/h (68 mph, 59 kn)
- Cruise speed: 80 km/h (50 mph, 43 kn) economical
- Stall speed: 50 km/h (31 mph, 27 kn)
- Range: 160 km (99 mi, 86 nmi) at average cruise speed
- g limits: +6.0, -4.0 recommended
- Maximum glide ratio: 6:1 at 70 kilometres per hour (43 mph; 38 kn)
- Rate of climb: 3.0 m/s (590 ft/min) best, measured at 850 m (2,790 ft), 10 °C (50 °F)
- Wing loading: 20.4 kg/m^{2} (4.2 lb/sq ft)
- Power/mass: 92 W/kg (0.056 hp/lb)
- Take-off distance: 30 m (98 ft)
- Landing distance: 50 m (160 ft)
