= Dan Denney =

American aircraft designer

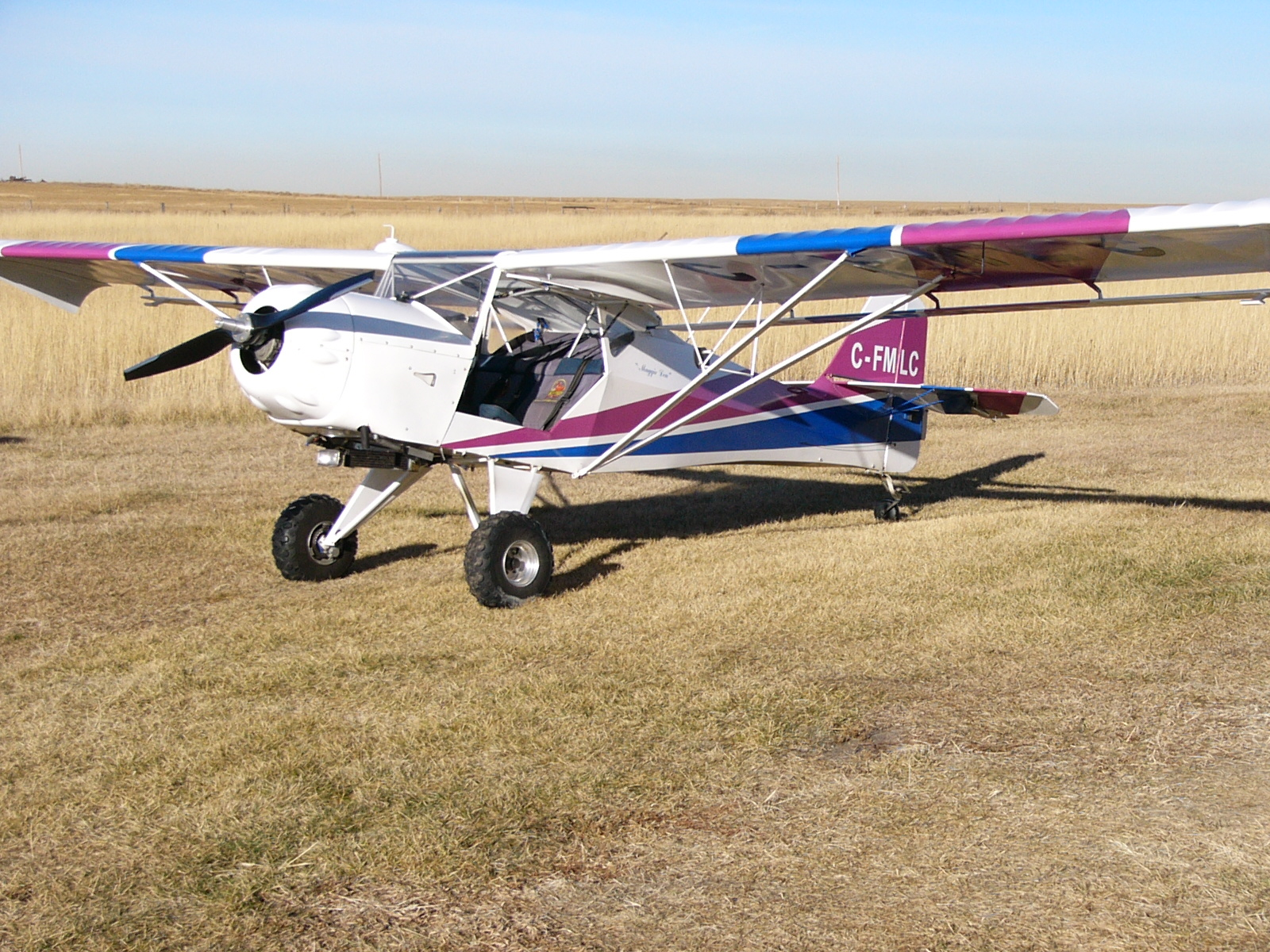
A Denney Kitfox Mark II

Dan Denney, of Idaho is the original designer of the Kitfox airplanes and founder of Denney Aerocraft. He was the 1991 recipient of the EAA August Raspet Memorial Award for his "outstanding contribution to the advancement of light aircraft design".

Denney designed and built the Thunder Mustang, a 3/4 scale carbon fiber P-51 replica. The venture was unsuccessful financially, but in 1999 it was the fastest homebuilt kit in production.

He built and owned 92XL, the fastest normally aspirated Glasair III ever constructed, which brought Denney a variety of racing records and awards from 1992 through 2003.

After leaving the aviation business, Denney began manufacturing a high end ATV-Sandrail dubbed the Ridge Runner. The product was manufactured in Nampa, Idaho by Denney's new company Ridge Runner of Idaho. Ridge Runner ceased manufacturing operations sometime during 2007 or 2008.
