= Butterfly Banty =

American ultralight aircraft

Banty

General information
- Type: Homebuilt aircraft
- National origin: United States
- Manufacturer: Butterfly Aero
- Designer: Mike Kimbrel
- Status: Plans no longer available (2013)
- Number built: 30 (1998)

History
- Introduction date: 1984

The Butterfly Banty, also called the Kimbrel Banty for its designer, is an American homebuilt ultralight aircraft that was designed by Mike Kimbrel and produced by Butterfly Aero of Oakville, Washington, introduced in 1984. The aircraft was supplied in the form of plans for amateur construction.

== Design and development ==
The Banty was designed to comply with the US FAR 103 Ultralight Vehicles rules, including the category's maximum empty weight of 254 lb (115 kg). The aircraft has a standard empty weight of 237 lb (108 kg). It features a strut-braced parasol wing, a single-seat open cockpit with a windshield, fixed conventional landing gear and a single engine in tractor configuration.

The aircraft is made from wood with its flying surfaces covered doped aircraft fabric. Its 32.00 ft (9.8 m) span wing utilizes flaps and has a wing area of 128.00 sq ft (11.892 m^{2}). The wings are supported by "V" struts with jury struts and can be folded for ground transport or storage. The cabin width is 22 in (56 cm). The acceptable power range is 28 to 36 hp (21 to 27 kW) and the standard engine used is the 28 hp (21 kW) Rotax 277 single cylinder, two-stroke powerplant. With this engine the standard day take-off roll is 220 ft (67.1 m) and landing roll is 200 ft (61.0 m)

The Banty has a typical empty weight of 237 lb (108 kg) and a gross weight of 500 lb (230 kg), giving a useful load of 263 lb (119 kg). With full fuel of 5 U.S. gallons (19 L; 4.2 imp gal) the payload for pilot and baggage is 233 lb (106 kg).

The plans included detailed parts drawings, a materials list and construction instructions intended to assist inexperienced builders. The designer estimates the construction time from the supplied plans as 500 hours.

== Operational history ==
By 1998, the company reported that 1820 sets of plans had been sold and 30 aircraft were flying.

== Specifications (Banty) ==
Data from AeroCrafter and Virtual Ultralight Museum

General characteristics

- Crew: one
- Length: 18 ft 10 in (5.74 m)
- Wingspan: 32 ft 0 in (9.75 m)
- Height: 6 ft 0 in (1.83 m)
- Wing area: 128.00 sq ft (11.892 m^{2})
- Fuel capacity: 5 U.S. gallons (19 L; 4.2 imp gal)
- Powerplant: 1 × Rotax 277 single cylinder, air-cooled, two stroke aircraft engine, 28 hp (21 kW)
- Propellers: 2-bladed wooden

Performance

- Maximum speed: 60 mph (97 km/h, 52 kn)
- Cruise speed: 50 mph (80 km/h, 43 kn)
- Stall speed: 25 mph (40 km/h, 22 kn)
- Range: 90 mi (140 km, 78 nmi)
- Service ceiling: 9,000 ft (2,700 m)
- Rate of climb: 400 ft/min (2.0 m/s)
- Wing loading: 3.9 lb/sq ft (19 kg/m^{2})
