= Belite Ultra Cub =

American ultralight aircraft

Ultra Cub
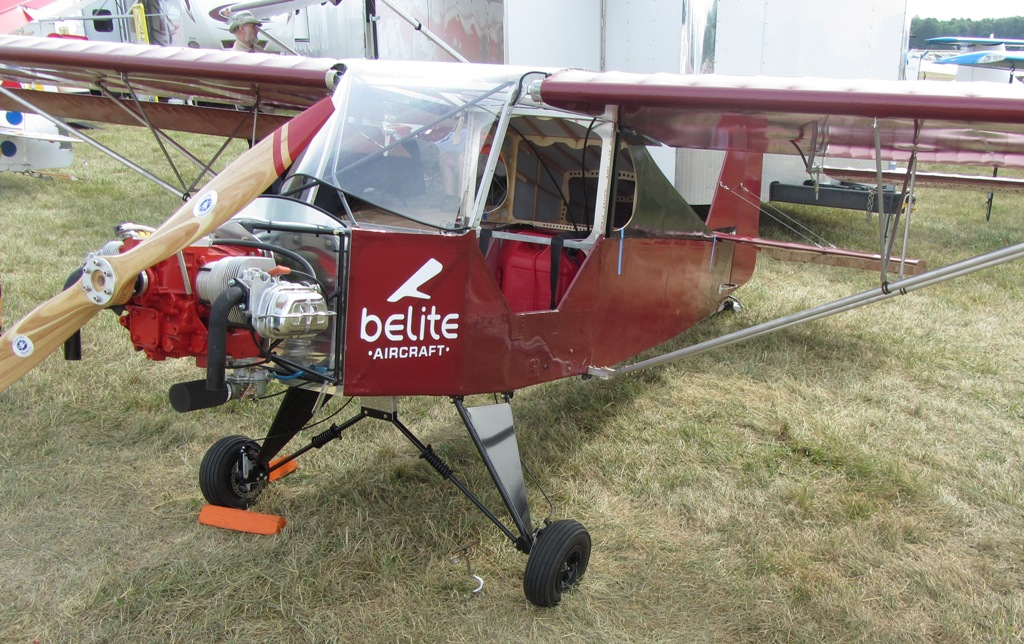

General information
- Type: Ultralight aircraft
- National origin: United States
- Manufacturer: Belite Aircraft
- Designer: James Wiebe
- Number built: 1

History
- Introduction date: 2012

The Belite Ultra Cub is an ultralight aircraft built by Belite Aircraft and intended as a tribute to the Piper Cub on the occasion of its 75th anniversary. The UltraCub was introduced at AirVenture 2012.

== Design and development ==
The Ultra Cub is a single-engine, single-place, strut-braced high-wing monoplane with either tricycle or conventional landing gear. The fuselage is constructed of riveted aluminum tubing with Dacron fabric substrate and (optionally) Oracal (adhesive vinyl) colored covering. The wing spar is aluminum with birch wood ribs, although a carbon fiber spar option is available. The wings can be folded for ground transportation or storage. The landing gear is made from spring steel. Storage includes three under-seat lockers. The turtledeck is removable. The standard engine used is the 45 hp (34 kW) Half VW four-stroke powerplant.

== Variants ==
Sealite
Version first flown in December 2013, equipped with amphibious floats and with an empty weight of 338 lb (153 kg).

== Specifications (Ultra Cub) ==
Data from Manufacturer and KitPlanes

General characteristics

- Crew: 1
- Empty weight: 278 lb (126 kg) with hand deployable parachute
- Gross weight: 550 lb (249 kg)
- Powerplant: 1 × Half Volkswagen 4 stroke, two cylinder horizontally opposed engine, 45 hp (34 kW)

Performance

- Cruise speed: 54 kn (62 mph, 100 km/h)
- Stall speed: 24 kn (28 mph, 45 km/h)

== See also ==
Related development

- Belite Aircraft Superlite
- Skystar Kitfox Lite (forerunner to the Belite line)

Aircraft of comparable role, configuration, and era

- Preceptor N3 Pup
- Hipp's Superbirds J-3 Kitten (Preceptor Pup is designed by a former Hipps worker)
- Ultravia Pelican
- Rocky Mountain Wings Ridge Runner
- Anglin J6 Karatoo
- Norman Aviation J6 Karatoo
- Wood Sky Pup
- Team Mini-Max Hi-MAX
- Fisher FP-202 Koala
- Light Miniature Aircraft LM-1
