= Aircore Cadet =

American ultralight aircraft

Cadet

General information
- Type: Ultralight aircraft
- National origin: United States
- Manufacturer: Aircore Industries
- Designer: Jim Scott
- Status: Production completed
- Number built: between 30-50 kits shipped

The Aircore Cadet is an American ultralight aircraft that was designed by Jim Scott and produced by Aircore Industries in the early 1980s. The aircraft was supplied as a kit for amateur construction.

== Design and development ==
The Cadet was designed to comply with the US FAR 103 Ultralight Vehicles rules, including the category's maximum empty weight of 254 lb (115 kg). The aircraft has a standard empty weight of 248 lb (112 kg). It features a strut-braced high-wing, single-seat, open cockpit, single tractor engine configuration, and is equipped with tricycle landing gear.

The aircraft is made from bolted together aluminum alloy tubing, with the wings and tail covered in Dacron sailcloth. Its 30 ft (9.1 m) span wing employs "V" lift struts and jury struts. The aircraft keel is an aluminum tube that runs from the tail, mounts the wings and the engine at its forward end. The standard factory-supplied engine is the 28 hp (21 kW) Rotax 277, driving a 60 in (152 cm) diameter fixed-pitch propeller with a 28 in (71 cm) pitch. The pilot sits on an open seat without a windshield. The control system is conventional three-axis, with half-span ailerons. The main landing gear is sprung steel and the nosewheel incorporates steering. There is a small tail caster to protect the tail. Brakes are optionally available.

Reviewer Andre Cliche describes the Cadet as "a clean and simple design that is inexpensive to maintain."

== Specifications (Cadet) ==
Data from Cliche.

General characteristics

- Crew: one
- Wingspan: 30 ft 0 in (9.14 m)
- Wing area: 163 sq ft (15.1 m^{2})
- Empty weight: 248 lb (112 kg)
- Gross weight: 530 lb (240 kg)
- Fuel capacity: 5 U.S. gallons (19 L; 4.2 imp gal)
- Powerplant: 1 × Rotax 277 single cylinder, two-stroke aircraft engine, 28 hp (21 kW)
- Propellers: 2-bladed wooden, 5 ft 0 in (1.52 m) diameter , 28 in (71 cm) pitch

Performance

- Maximum speed: 55 mph (89 km/h, 48 kn)
- Cruise speed: 45 mph (72 km/h, 39 kn)
- Stall speed: 18 mph (29 km/h, 16 kn)
- Never exceed speed: 73 mph (117 km/h, 63 kn)
- Range: 110 mi (180 km, 96 nmi)
- Service ceiling: 12,500 ft (3,800 m)
- g limits: +6/-4
- Maximum glide ratio: 8:1
- Rate of climb: 600 ft/min (3.0 m/s)
- Rate of sink: 320 ft/min (1.6 m/s)
- Wing loading: 3.25 lb/sq ft (15.9 kg/m^{2})
