= Light Miniature Aircraft LM-1 =

American homebuilt aircraft

General information
- Type: Ultralight aircraft
- National origin: United States
- Manufacturer: Light Miniature Aircraft
- Status: Plans no longer available, kits still available

History
- Introduction date: 1985
- First flight: 1985

The Light Miniature Aircraft LM-1, LM-2 and LM-3 are a family of American high wing, conventional landing gear, strut-braced, single engine ultralight aircraft that are scale reproductions of famous general aviation aircraft. The designs were all available as plans from Light Miniature Aircraft of Okeechobee, Florida for amateur construction.

The Light Miniature Aircraft company website domain name expired on 25 May 2010 and has not been renewed. The company seems to have gone out of business about 2010, but Wicks Aircraft continued to provide kits for the designs for a period of time afterwards, although, as of 2022, they no longer do so.

== Design and development ==
The LM-1 family were designed in the mid-1980s during the initial ultralight boom. Many pilots did not find the typical early ultralights that resemble a "flying lawnchair", such as the Pterodactyl Ascender or Eipper Quicksilver confidence inspiring or appealing. The LM line was intended to fit the same FAR Part 103 rules, including its 254 lb (115 kg) empty weight, but provide an aircraft that looks and flies much more like a traditional light aircraft. Many of the family are heavier than the US ultralight rules permit.

The LM-1 family consists of a basic aircraft design, rendered in wood or optionally 4130 steel tube, with minor changes in the cowling, window and tail shapes to make them resemble well-known light aircraft. The first in the series, the LM-1 was first flown in 1985. The aircraft are sold as plans, with components or complete kits also available to speed construction time.

All aircraft in the series feature enclosed cabins allowing year-round flying, docile handling characteristics and a 300-hour construction time.

== Variants ==
LM-1A-W
Single seat 85% scale replica of a Piper J-3 Cub, powered by a 50 hp (37 kW) Rotax 503 engine. Built from wood and covered in doped aircraft fabric. Empty weight 350 lb (159 kg), gross weight 600 lb (272 kg). First flown in 1992.
LM-1U
Single seat 75% scale replica of a Piper J-3 Cub, built from wood and covered in doped aircraft fabric. Empty weight 252 lb (114 kg), gross weight 500 lb (227 kg). Fits the US ultralight category.
LM-1X
Single seat 75% scale replica of a Piper J-3 Cub, powered by a 40 hp (30 kW) Rotax 447 engine. Built from steel tube and covered in doped aircraft fabric. Empty weight 300 lb (136 kg), gross weight 600 lb (272 kg). First flown in 1985.
LM-1-2P-W Puddle Jumper
Two seat 85% scale replica of a Piper J-3 Cub, powered by a 64 hp (48 kW) Rotax 582 engine. Built from wood and covered in doped aircraft fabric. Empty weight 430 lb (195 kg), gross weight 875 lb (397 kg).
LM-2U
Single seat 75% scale replica of a Taylorcraft B, built from wood and covered in doped aircraft fabric. Empty weight 252 lb (114 kg), gross weight 500 lb (227 kg). Fits the US ultralight category.
LM-2X
Single seat 75% scale replica of a Taylorcraft B, powered by a 40 hp (30 kW) Rotax 447 engine. Built from steel tube and covered in doped aircraft fabric. Empty weight 300 lb (136 kg), gross weight 600 lb (272 kg). First flown in 1987.
LM-2X-2P
Two seat 75% scale replica of a Taylorcraft B, powered by a 64 hp (48 kW) Rotax 582 engine. Built from steel tube and covered in doped aircraft fabric.
LM-2X-2P-W
Two seat 75% scale replica of a Taylorcraft B, powered by a 64 hp (48 kW) Rotax 582 engine. Built from wood and covered in doped aircraft fabric. Empty weight 460 lb (209 kg), gross weight 875 lb (397 kg). First flown in 1987.
LM-3U
Single seat 75% scale replica of an Aeronca Champ, built from wood and covered in doped aircraft fabric. Empty weight 252 lb (114 kg), gross weight 500 lb (227 kg). Fits the US ultralight category.
LM-3X
Single seat 75% scale replica of an Aeronca Champ, powered by a 40 hp (30 kW) Rotax 447 engine. Built from steel tube and covered in doped aircraft fabric. Empty weight 300 lb (136 kg), gross weight 600 lb (272 kg). First flown in 1987.
LM-3X-W
Single seat 75% scale replica of an Aeronca Champ, powered by a 50 hp (37 kW) Rotax 503 engine. Built from wood and covered in doped aircraft fabric. Empty weight 335 lb (152 kg), gross weight 600 lb (272 kg).

== Specifications (LM-1X) ==
Data from Kitplanes

General characteristics

- Crew: one
- Length: 17 ft 9 in (5.41 m)
- Wingspan: 30 ft 0 in (9.14 m)
- Height: 5 ft 7 in (1.70 m)
- Wing area: 120 sq ft (11 m^{2})
- Empty weight: 300 lb (136 kg)
- Gross weight: 600 lb (272 kg)
- Fuel capacity: 5 US gallons (19 litres)
- Powerplant: 1 × Rotax 447 twin cylinder, two-stroke aircraft engine, 40 hp (30 kW)
- Propellers: 2-bladed wooden propeller

Performance

- Maximum speed: 75 mph (121 km/h, 65 kn)
- Cruise speed: 65 mph (105 km/h, 56 kn)
- Stall speed: 26 mph (42 km/h, 23 kn)
- Range: 170 mi (280 km, 150 nmi)
- Rate of climb: 550 ft/min (2.8 m/s)
- Wing loading: 5.0 lb/sq ft (24 kg/m^{2})

Avionics
none

== See also ==
Aircraft of comparable role, configuration, and era

- Preceptor N3 Pup
- J-3 Kitten
- Hipps J-3 Kitten
- Belite Ultra Cub
- Ultravia Pelican
- Rocky Mountain Wings Ridge Runner
- Anglin J6 Karatoo
- Norman Aviation J6 Karatoo
- Wood Sky Pup
- Team Mini-Max Hi-MAX
- Fisher FP-202 Koala
