= Ultra-Fab Sundowner =

American ultralight aircraft

Sundowner

General information
- Type: Ultralight aircraft
- National origin: United States
- Manufacturer: Ultra-Fab
- Designer: Bob Leinen
- Status: Production completed

History
- Introduction date: 1983

The Ultra-Fab Sundowner, also called the Sundowner Convertible, is an American ultralight aircraft that was designed by Bob Leinen and produced by Ultra-Fab. The aircraft was supplied as a kit for amateur construction.

== Design and development ==
The aircraft was designed to comply with the US FAR 103 Ultralight Vehicles rules, including the category's maximum empty weight of 254 lb (115 kg). The aircraft has a standard empty weight of 248 lb (112 kg). It features a strut-braced high wing, a single-seat, conventional landing gear and a single engine in tractor configuration.

The aircraft is made from bolted-together aluminum tubing, covered in Dacron sailcloth. Its 30.5 ft (9.3 m) span wing is supported by "V" struts and jury struts. A single aluminum tube acts as the fuselage keel and supports the tail at the aft end, the wings in the middle and the engine at the front. The engines supplied include the 28 hp (21 kW) Rotax 277 and the 35 hp (26 kW) Cuyuna UL II. The aircraft may be flown with an open cockpit or with zippered sailcloth cockpit enclosure panels installed for cold weather flying. The controls are conventional three-axis and include a center stick, adjustable rudder pedals and full-span ailerons. The landing gear has aluminum torsion suspension on all wheels and the tailwheel is steerable.

The aircraft was introduced just as the ultralight market in the US became saturated and demand collapsed. As a result, even though the Sundowner had many innovative features, it was not a commercial success.

== Specifications (Sundowner) ==
Data from Cliche and the Virtual Ultralight Museum

General characteristics

- Crew: one
- Wingspan: 30 ft 6 in (9.30 m)
- Wing area: 146 sq ft (13.6 m^{2})
- Empty weight: 248 lb (112 kg)
- Gross weight: 500 lb (227 kg)
- Fuel capacity: 4.5 U.S. gallons (17 L; 3.7 imp gal)
- Powerplant: 1 × Rotax 277 , 28 hp (21 kW)

Performance

- Maximum speed: 62 mph (100 km/h, 54 kn)
- Cruise speed: 50 mph (80 km/h, 43 kn)
- Stall speed: 25 mph (40 km/h, 22 kn)
- g limits: +6/-4
- Maximum glide ratio: 7.5:1
- Rate of climb: 800 ft/min (4.1 m/s)
