= Rotax 277 =

Austrian two-stroke aircraft engine

277
- Type: Piston aero-engine
- National origin: Austria
- Manufacturer: Rotax
- Major applications: Ultralight aircraft

The Rotax 277 is a 26 hp (19 kW), single-cylinder, two-stroke aircraft engine, that was built by BRP-Rotax GmbH & Co. KG of Austria for use in ultralight aircraft.

== Development ==
The Rotax 277 features a single piston ported, air-cooled cylinder head and cylinder, utilizing either a fan or free air for cooling. Lubrication is pre-mixed fuel and oil. The 277 has a single Bosch flywheel magneto generator 12 volt ignition system and is equipped with a 36 mm Bing double float carburetor, with either a hand lever or cable choke.

The Rotax 277 is no longer in production.

== Applications ==
- Aces High Cuby I
- Advanced Aeromarine Buccaneer XA
- Aero Adventure Aventura UL
- Aerodyne Systems Vector
- Aerotique Parasol
- Aircore Cadet
- AmeriPlanes Mitchell Wing A-10
- Applebay Zia
- Avid Champion
- Bagalini Bagaliante
- Birdman Chinook WT-11
- Butterfly Banty
- Canaero Toucan
- Capella Javelin
- Carlson Sparrow
- Dart Skycycle
- Earthstar Thunder Gull
- Fisher Avenger
- Fisher FP-101
- Fisher FP-202 Koala
- Fisher FP-303
- Fisher FP-404
- Fisher FP-505 Skeeter
- Fisher FP-606 Sky Baby
- Flightstar
- Flying K Sky Raider
- Goldwing Ltd Goldwing
- Green Sky Adventures Micro Mong
- Hipp's Superbirds J-3 Kitten
- Hipp's Superbirds J-4 Sportster
- Hipp's Superbirds Reliant
- Howland H-3 Pegasus
- Hummel CA-2
- ISON Airbike
- JDT Hi-MAX
- Kolb Firefly
- Kolb Firestar
- Maxair Drifter
- Loehle Spad XIII
- Loehle Sport Parasol
- Mountaineer Trikes Mite-Lite
- Murphy JDM-8
- Piccard Eureka
- Raceair Skylite
- RagWing RW4 Midwing Sport
- Rans S-4 Coyote
- Rocky Mountain Wings Ridge Runner
- Skye Treck Skyseeker
- Sorrell Hiperlight
- Spartan DFS Trike
- Spectrum Beaver RX-28
- Stanton Sunbird
- Swallow Aeroplane Company Swallow A
- TEAM 1030R MAX-103
- Teratorn T/A
- Thor T/A
- Titan Tornado
- Ultra-Fab Sundowner
- US Aviation Cloud Dancer
- Wood Sky Pup
- V-STOL Solution
- Zenair Zipper

== Specifications (277) ==
Data from ROTAX 277 UL Data Sheet

=== General characteristics ===
- Type: two-stroke air-cooled aeroengine
- Bore: 72 mm (2.83 in)
- Stroke: 66 mm (2.60 in)
- Displacement: 268.7 cc (16.40 cu in)
- Dry weight: 29.5 kg (65 lb) (complete including reduction drive and exhaust system)

=== Components ===
- Valvetrain: piston ports
- Fuel system: pneumatic pump pressurized
- Fuel type: premium unleaded autofuel
- Oil system: premixed in the fuel at 50:1
- Cooling system: fan or free air

=== Performance ===
- Power output: 19 kW (26 hp) at 6250 rpm
- Compression ratio: Theoretical 11.8, effective 6.7
- Power-to-weight ratio: 0.64 kW/kg (0.40 hp/lb)

== See also ==
- Hirth F-30
- KFM 107
- Zanzottera MZ 34
