= Canaero Toucan =

Canadian ultralight aircraft

Toucan
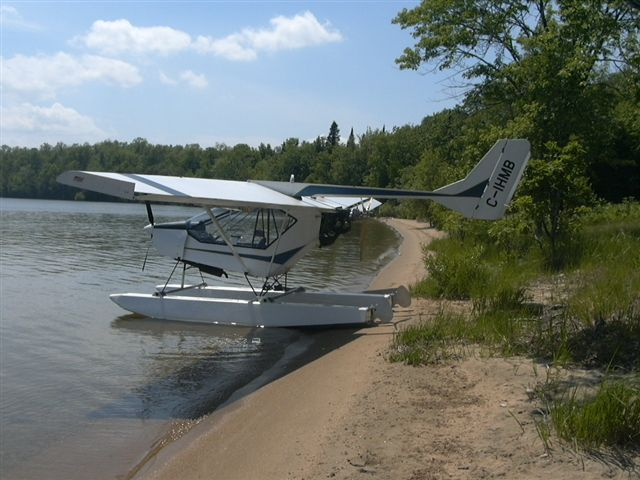

General information
- Type: Ultralight aircraft
- National origin: Canada
- Manufacturer: Canaero Dynamics Aircraft
- Designer: Peter Corley
- Primary user: private owners

History
- Introduction date: January 1986
- First flight: September 1983

The Canaero Toucan is a Canadian high-wing, two seats in tandem, twin engine push-pull configuration, twin-boom ultralight kit aircraft that was produced from 1983 to the late 1980s by Canaero Dynamics Aircraft of Rexdale, Ontario.

The Toucan greatly resembles an ultralight Cessna Skymaster.

== Design and development ==
The Toucan design work started in January 1983 and was completed in April of the same year, with the first flight of the prototype in September 1983. Construction of the first pre-production aircraft was started in July 1985 with the first production aircraft flying in January 1986.

Four prototypes/pre-production aircraft were completed, which were followed by a run of twelve Toucans, all completed by June 1986. A second batch of 25 aircraft were planned to have been completed by November 1986 as well.

The Toucan design features a strut-braced high wing built from aluminum covered with aircraft fabric. The wing's leading edge is of "D" cell construction and has fiberglass wing tips. Flight controls are conventional three-axis with full-span flaperons and twin rudders. The fuselage is constructed from welded 4130 steel tube. When originally delivered an airframe parachute was standard.

The landing gear is of tricycle gear configuration with the main gear legs of sprung steel and brakes are standard equipment. Wheel pants, skis and pontoons were optional.

The original engines were 28 hp (21 kW) Rotax 277s with 35 hp (26 kW) Rotax 377 engines as optional, although some aircraft have been modified with larger engines.

== Operational history ==
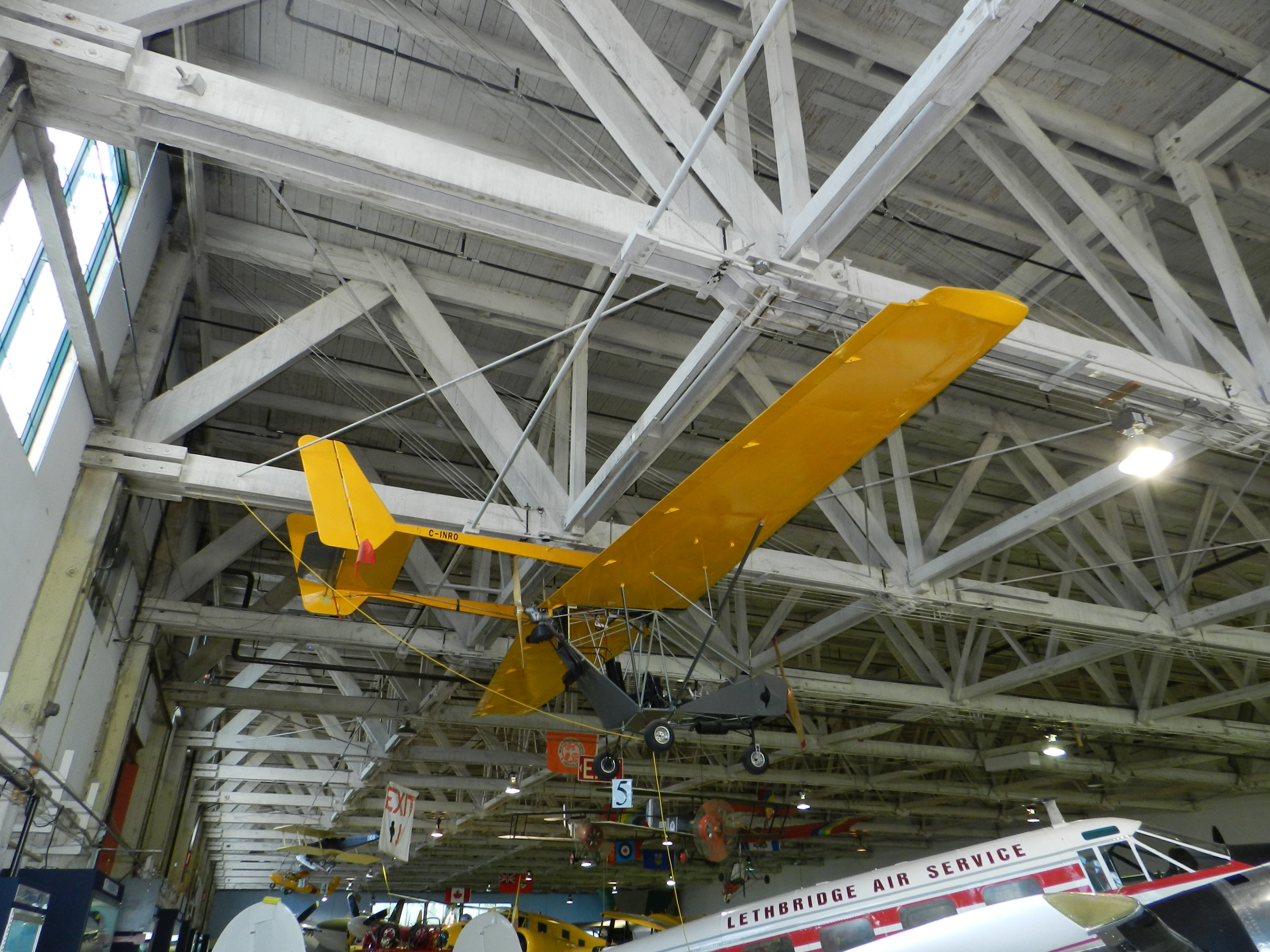
Toucan on display at the Alberta Aviation Museum.

In Canada Toucans are registered as basic ultralights which prohibits passenger-carrying. Both seats can only be occupied by a student and instructor or two licensed pilots.

In November 2016 there were still five Toucans registered in Canada.

== Aircraft on display ==
- Alberta Aviation Museum - in long term storage (2019)

== Specifications (Toucan T-IV) ==
Data from Janes All the Worlds Aircraft 1986-87

General characteristics

- Crew: one
- Capacity: one passenger
- Length: 18 ft 11.75 in (5.7849 m)
- Wingspan: 38 ft 6 in (11.73 m)
- Height: 9 ft 4 in (2.84 m)
- Wing area: 182 sq ft (16.9 m^{2})
- Empty weight: 393 lb (178 kg)
- Gross weight: 900 lb (408 kg)
- Powerplant: 2 × Rotax 277 single cylinder two-stroke aircraft engine, 28 hp (21 kW) each

Performance

- Maximum speed: 75 mph (121 km/h, 65 kn)
- Cruise speed: 65 mph (105 km/h, 56 kn)
- Stall speed: 24 mph (39 km/h, 21 kn)
- Range: 170 mi (270 km, 150 nmi)
- Service ceiling: 10,000 ft (3,000 m)
- g limits: +6/-3
- Rate of climb: 1,150 ft/min (5.8 m/s) solo, 165 lb pilot
- Wing loading: 4.95 lb/sq ft (24.2 kg/m^{2})
