= Thor T/A =

Canadian ultralight aircraft

T/A

General information
- Type: Ultralight aircraft
- National origin: Canada
- Manufacturer: Thor Air
- Designer: Thorsten B. Strenger (or possibly Gunter Webster)
- Status: Production completed

History
- Introduction date: 1985

The Thor T/A is a Canadian ultralight aircraft that was designed by Thorsten B. Strenger (or possibly Gunter Webster) and produced by Thor Air of Weston, Ontario. The aircraft was supplied as a kit for amateur construction.

== Design and development ==
The aircraft was designed to comply with the US FAR 103 Ultralight Vehicles rules, including the category's maximum empty weight of 254 lb (115 kg). The aircraft has a standard empty weight of 238 lb (108 kg). It features a strut-braced high-wing, a single-seat, open cockpit, conventional landing gear and a single engine in tractor configuration.

The aircraft is made from bolted-together aluminum tubing, with its flying surfaces covered in Dacron sailcloth. Its 80% double-surface 32.3 ft (9.8 m) span wing is braced with "V" lift struts. The pilot is accommodated on an open seat, protected by a simple windshield. The landing gear has suspension on the main wheels and features a steerable tailwheel. The three-axis control system is unusual. Pitch and roll are conventionally controlled with elevator and rudder, while roll is controlled with tip rudders.

== Variants ==
T/A
Initial design, powered by a 28 hp (21 kW) Rotax 277 single cylinder, two-stroke powerplant.
1-A
Up-engined model, powered by a 40 hp (30 kW) Rotax 447 twin cylinder, two-stroke powerplant.
Two-seater
Similar to the single-seat models but with a second seat for dual instruction.

== Specifications (T/A) ==
Data from Cliche and the Virtual Ultralight Museum

General characteristics

- Crew: one
- Length: 13.8 ft (4.2 m)
- Wingspan: 32 ft 4 in (9.86 m)
- Height: 7 ft 8 in (2.34 m)
- Wing area: 167 sq ft (15.5 m^{2})
- Empty weight: 238 lb (108 kg)
- Gross weight: 500 lb (227 kg)
- Fuel capacity: 5 U.S. gallons (19 L; 4.2 imp gal)
- Powerplant: 1 × Rotax 277 single cylinder, two-stroke aircraft engine, 28 hp (21 kW)

Performance

- Maximum speed: 63 mph (101 km/h, 55 kn)
- Cruise speed: 55 mph (89 km/h, 48 kn)
- Stall speed: 22 mph (35 km/h, 19 kn)
- Service ceiling: 10,000 ft (3,000 m)
- g limits: +3/-2
- Maximum glide ratio: 9:1
- Rate of climb: 700 ft/min (3.6 m/s)
