= Rocky Mountain Wings Ridge Runner =

Family of American high wing aircraft

General information
- Type: Ultralight aircraft
- National origin: United States
- Manufacturer: Rocky Mountain Wings
- Designer: Stace Schrader
- Status: Production completed (2018)
- Number built: 68 (Ridge Runner 1, 2011); 15 (Ridge Runner 2, 2011); 59 (Ridge Runner 3, 2011); 4 (Ridge Runner 4, 2011)

History
- Manufactured: 2000-2018
- Introduction date: 2000
- Developed from: Denney Kitfox

The Rocky Mountain Wings Ridge Runner is a family of American high wing, strut-braced, single engine, conventional landing gear aircraft that were designed by Stace Schrader and were produced by Rocky Mountain Wings of Nampa, Idaho for amateur construction from 2000 to 2018.

Following a lawsuit in 2018, and disputes with other customers, the company closed, production ended and its website was taken down by June 2019.

== Design and development ==
Introduced at Airventure, Oshkosh, Wisconsin in July 2000, the first Ridge Runner was a single seater designed as an FAR 103 Ultralight Vehicles compliant aircraft that would have an empty weight within that category's 254 lb (115 kg) empty weight limit.

The designer, Stace Schrader was formerly involved with Avid Aircraft, the Denney Kitfox and Sky Raider LLC designs, all similar aircraft. The resulting aircraft was described by reviewer Andre Cliche as "a clone identical to its predecessors except for a few details like, for example the type of ailerons and balloon tires for rough terrain operations."

The aircraft has an optional powder coated 4130 steel tube frame fuselage covered in doped fabric. The wing is constructed with aluminium tube spars and is also fabric-covered. The kit includes many pre-fabricated parts, including the wing ribs, seat belts and shoulder harnesses, wheels and tires. The manufacturer estimates the construction time as 250–600 hours, depending on the options selected and builder experience.

The Ridge Runner 1 requires a very light engine to remain under 254 lb (115 kg) empty weight and the specified engine remains the out-of-production 28 hp (21 kW) Rotax 277.

== Variants ==
Ridge Runner Model 1 Ultralight
Original model, a single seat, FAR 103 compliant aircraft, with a 247 lb (112 kg) empty weight when equipped with the out-of-production 28 hp (21 kW) Rotax 277 engine, or alternatively an experimental light sport aircraft. Acceptable power range 20 to 80 hp (15 to 60 kW).
Ridge Runner Model 2
Light sport or amateur-built version, similar to the Model 1, but with a jump seat added, though without dual controls, and an empty weight increased to 350 lb (159 kg), gross weight 950 lb (431 kg). Acceptable power range 28 to 52 hp (21 to 39 kW). The manufacturer says of this model: "Ridge Runner II is not a full two place. It has a small jump seat or cargo area"
Ridge Runner Model 3
Light sport or amateur-built version, with two seats in tandem with dual controls. Standard engine is the Rotax 503 of 52 hp (39 kW). Acceptable power range 40 to 100 hp (30 to 75 kW).
Ridge Runner Model 4
Light sport or amateur-built version, with two seats in side-by-side configuration with dual controls. Standard engine is the Rotax 912 of 80 hp (60 kW). Acceptable power range 45 to 120 hp (34 to 89 kW).

== Specifications (Ridge Runner 1 Ultralight) ==
Data from Kitplanes

General characteristics

- Crew: one
- Length: 17 ft 0 in (5.18 m)
- Wingspan: 26 ft 2 in (7.98 m)
- Height: 5 ft 3 in (1.60 m)
- Wing area: 99.4 sq ft (9.23 m^{2})
- Empty weight: 247 lb (112 kg)
- Gross weight: 900 lb (408 kg)
- Fuel capacity: 5 US gallons (19 litres)
- Powerplant: 1 × Rotax 277 , 28 hp (21 kW)
- Propellers: 2-bladed wooden

Performance

- Cruise speed: 55 mph (89 km/h, 48 kn)
- Stall speed: 23 mph (37 km/h, 20 kn)
- Range: 140 mi (230 km, 120 nmi)
- Rate of climb: 700 ft/min (3.6 m/s)

== See also ==
Related development

- Avid Flyer
- Denney Kitfox
- Flying K Sky Raider

Aircraft of comparable role, configuration, and era

- Preceptor N3 Pup (by a former Hipps worker)
- Belite Ultra Cub
- Ultravia Pelican
- J-3 Kitten
- Anglin J6 Karatoo
- Norman Aviation J6 Karatoo
- Wood Sky Pup
- Team Mini-Max Hi-MAX
- Fisher FP-202 Koala
- Carlson Sparrow
