= Ultravia Pelican =

Canadian high-wing, single-engine, tractor configuration ultralight aircraft

Pelican
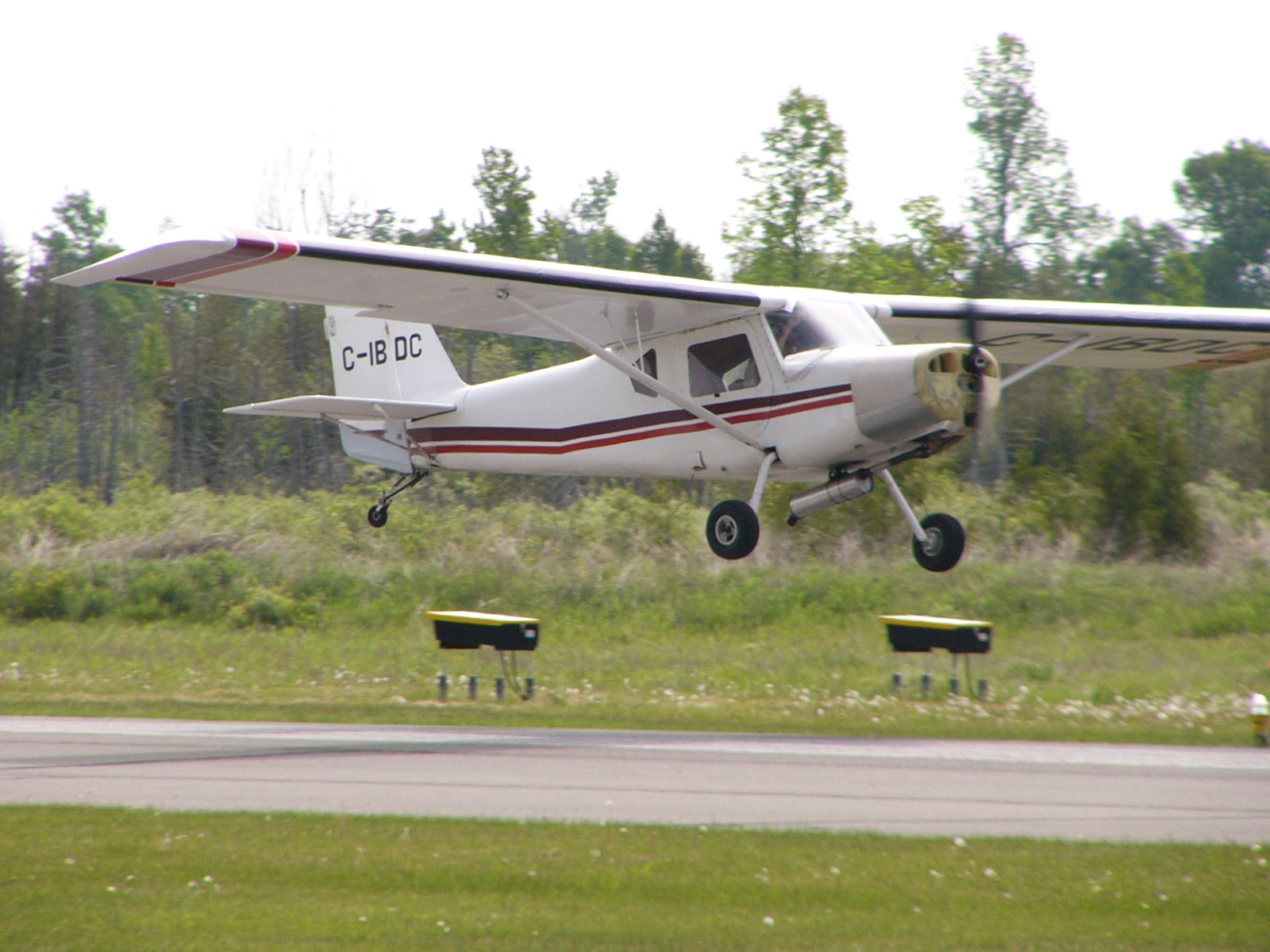
- Ultravia Pelican Club

General information
- Type: Ultralight aircraft
- National origin: Canada
- Manufacturer: Ultravia; New Kolb Aircraft; Aerodesign; Flyer Indústria Aeronáutica; Ballard Sport Aircraft
- Designer: Jean Rene Lepage
- Status: In production as the Ballard Pelican (2012)

History
- Manufactured: Le Pelican 1983-85; Pelican and subsequent two seat models 1985-2006; Aerodesign Pegasus 1997-2004; Pelican 500BR circa2001-2009 Flyer Kolb SS circa2008-2016 Flyer F600NG 2016-present Pelican PL and Sport 600 2009-present

The Ultravia Pelican is the name given to two series of high-wing, single-engine, tractor configuration ultralight aircraft that were designed by Jean Rene Lepage and produced in kit form for amateur construction by Ultravia Aero International of Mascouche, Quebec and later Gatineau, Quebec.

== Design and development ==
The first Le Pelican was designed as a single-seat aircraft powered by a two-cylinder 18 hp (13 kW) Briggs & Stratton four-stroke lawnmower engine. It was designed in the early 1980s and greatly resembles the Aeronca C-2 of 1929.

The original Le Pelican airframe is constructed from aluminum tubing, using gussets and pop rivets. The wing consists of a "D" cell with foam and aluminum ribs. All flying surfaces are covered in doped aircraft fabric. The very first Pelicans had wire-bracing for the wing and spoilers for roll control. These were replaced with strut-bracing and one-third span ailerons. The enclosed cabin, designed for Quebec winters included Lexan doors. The Pelican's conventional landing gear consists of a fibreglass rod for the main gear, with a tailskid, replaced on later models by a steerable tailwheel.

The original Le Pelican was replaced in production by the single-seat Super Pelican which has taller landing gear and a Half VW engine of 35 hp (26 kW).

The single-seat Le Pelican production ran from 1983 to 1985, with about 100 kits delivered. Due to demand for two-seaters Lepage designed a new "clean-sheet" aircraft in 1984, which retained the same name as the earlier single-seater. The two-seat Pelican Club and its derivatives were built in large numbers, with more than 700 flying by 2003. The original Pelican Club has a fibreglass fuselage and aluminum frame wings with aircraft fabric covering. The wings were later made all-metal and this model became the Pelican PL. The PL was available from the factory equipped with a 100 hp (75 kW) Rotax 912ULS or a 115 hp (86 kW) Rotax 914 turbocharged engine. Options included tricycle or conventional landing gear.

The Pelican was initially produced in kit form by Ultravia of Mascouche, Quebec. The company later relocated to Gatineau, Quebec. The single-seat Le Pelican series was produced from 1983–85 and the two-seat Pelican series was built from 1985 until Ultravia went out of business in 2006.

In 1994, the Brazilian company Aerodesign certified and produced a new version of the Pelican PL and the Pelican Club, designated the Aerodesign AD2000 Pegasus under the National Civil Aviation Agency of Brazil H.03 program, although the approval is currently listed as "cancelled". In 1997 the company marketed this model as the Aerodesign Pegasus. In 1999 this model was listed as eligible to be sold as a kit in Australia by the Australian Ultralight Federation.

Since 2001 the Brazilian company Flyer Indústria Aeronáutica has assembled and produced several other aircraft designs based on the Pelican, as the Pelican 500BR, Kolb SS and the F600NG.

Ultravia signed The New Kolb Aircraft Company as US distributor for the Pelican Sport 600 model in 2003. Kolb displayed the aircraft at Sun 'n Fun and AirVenture between 2003 and 2005. Ultravia pursued certification of the Pelican Tutor model under CAR 523 VLA, with the National Research Council conducting the test flying under contract, but Ultravia went out of business before completing certification. In 2006 Kolb purchased the assets of the bankrupt Ultravia and developed the aircraft, in partnership with Flyer Indústria Aeronáutica of Brazil into the Kolb Flyer Super Sport, based on pilot feedback gathered. The two-seat Kolb Flyer SS design was put into production in 2008.

The Flyer SS's fuselage is built from carbon fibre and weighs 77 lb (35 kg), while the wing is made from 6061-T6 and 2024-T3 aluminum. Power is provided by a 100 hp (75 kW) Rotax 912ULS aircraft engine, giving a cruise speed of 117 kn (217 km/h).

In about 2007 Kolb sold the rights to produce the Pelican line to Ballard Sport Aircraft of Sherbrooke, Quebec, who presently manufacturer kits and ready-to-fly advanced ultralight aircraft.

== Variants ==
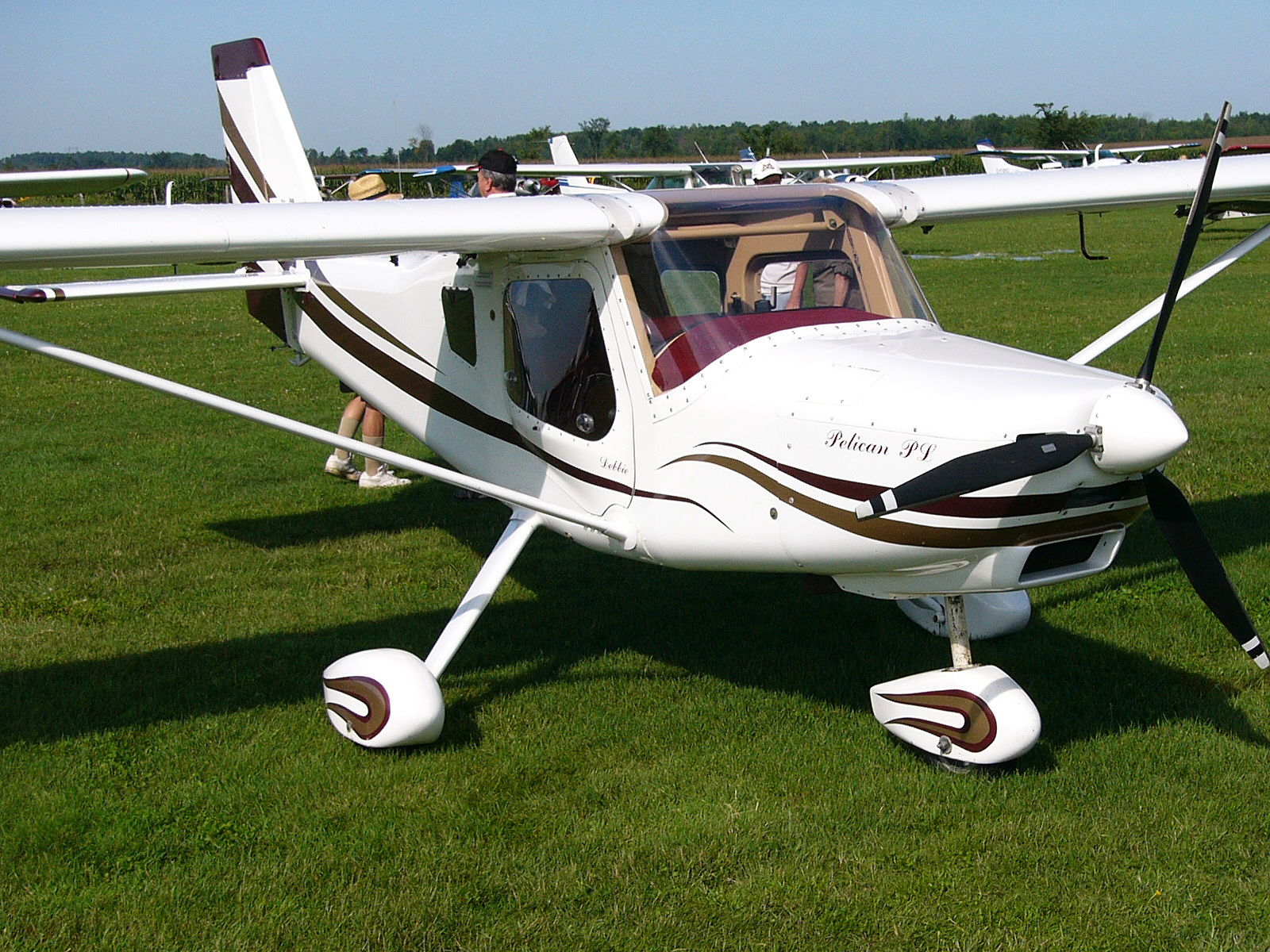
Pelican PL with tricycle gear

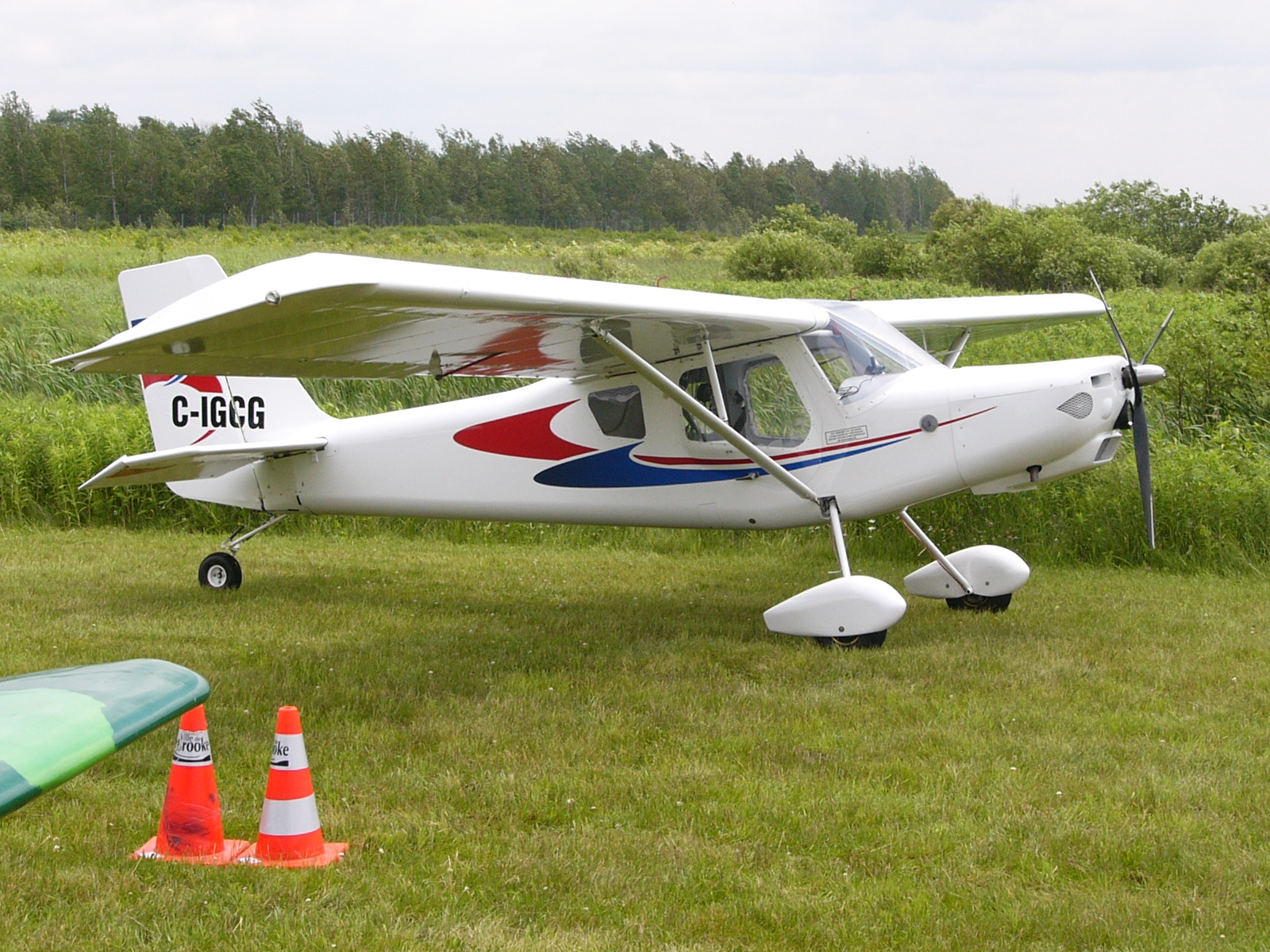
Ultravia Pelican Club GS advanced ultralight with conventional landing gear

Le Pelican
Original single-seat model, powered by a two-cylinder 18 hp (13 kW) Briggs & Stratton four-stroke lawnmower engine and featuring low landing gear.
Super Pelican
Improved single-seat model with higher main landing gear and powered by a 35 hp (26 kW) Half VW engine.
Pelican Club
Two-seat side-by-side model with fabric covered wing introduced in 1985.
Pelican PL
Two-seat side-by-side model powered by a 100 hp (75 kW) Rotax 912ULS or 115 hp (86 kW) Rotax 914 and introduced in 1991. The PL could be built as a conventional landing gear or tricycle gear aircraft, with optional skis, floats or amphibious floats available. Gross weight 1,400 lb (635 kg).
Pelican Sport
Development of the PL with a new longer span wing and a higher lift airfoil, introduced in 1998. Wing includes an STOL kit with drooping ailerons. Gross weight 1,232 lb (559 kg) for the Canadian advanced ultralight category.
Pelican Sport 600
Development of the Pelican Sport with a 600 kg (1,323 lb) gross weight for the US Light sport aircraft category. As of April 2017, the design does not appear on the Federal Aviation Administration's list of approved special light-sport aircraft.
Pelican Tutor
Proposed certified version, certification was never completed.
Flyer Super Sport (Flyer SS)
Redesigned and developed version of the Sport 600, introduced in July 2008 and produced until about 2016 by New Kolb Aircraft as a light-sport category aircraft.
Pelican AULA 600
Factory-assembled model for the Canadian AULA category.
Aerodesign Pegasus
Brazilian redesigned version, cruising at 110 mph (177 km/h), with a stall speed of 35 mph (56 km/h), MTOW 1,100 lb (499 kg), aluminium wings and composite fuselage and tail.
Flyer F600NG
A lightened version of the Pelican 500BR and Kolb SS, developed by Flyer Aircraft to fit the new Brazilian LSA regulations.

== Accidents and incidents ==
In July 2025, a Pelican collided with a dock, leading to the death of a teenager standing on the dock. The pilot and passenger sustained minor injuries.

== Specifications (Le Pelican) ==
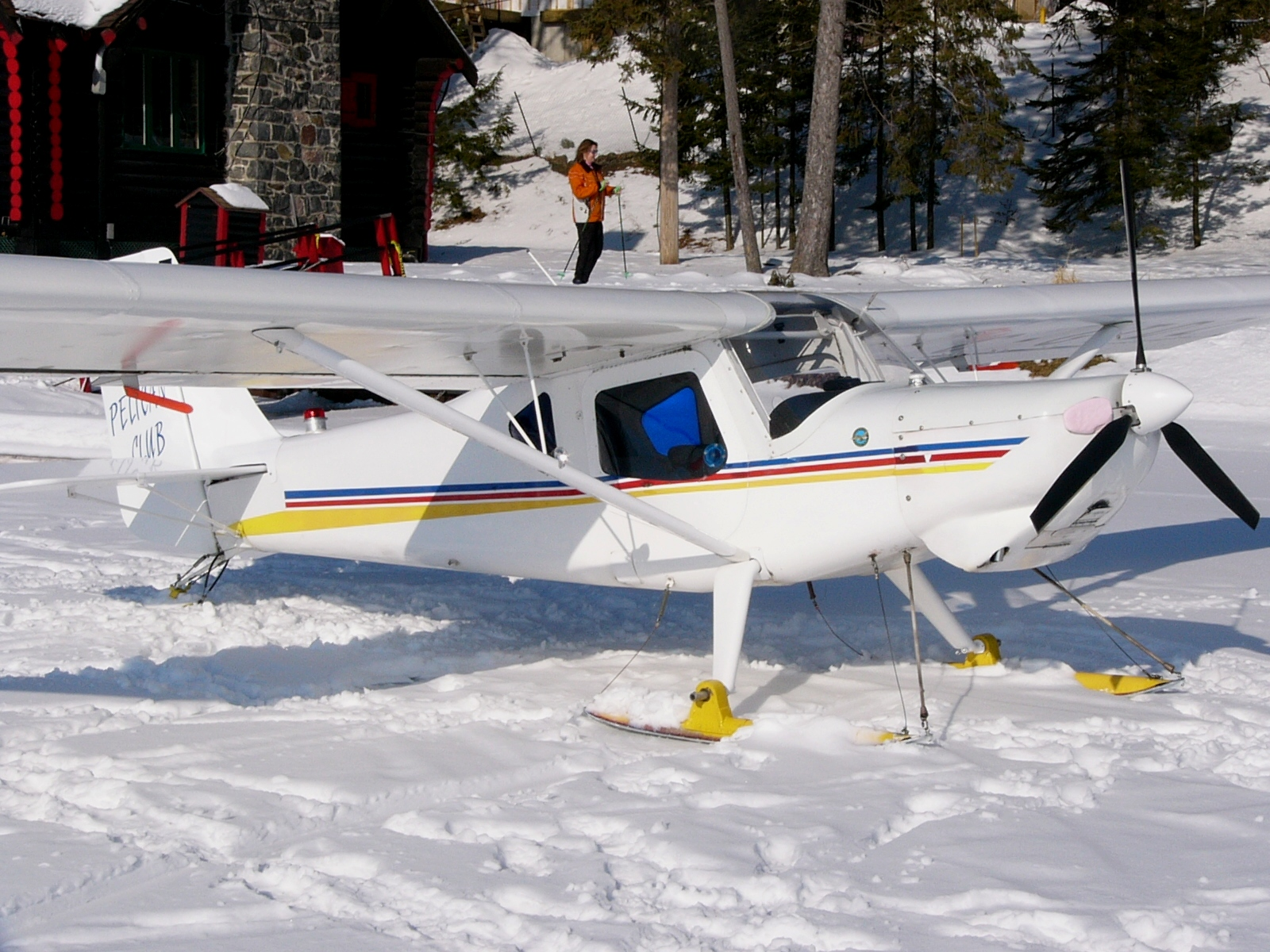
Pelican Club amateur-built on skis

Data from Cliche

General characteristics

- Crew: one
- Wingspan: 37 ft 0 in (11.28 m)
- Wing area: 140 sq ft (13 m^{2})
- Empty weight: 210 lb (95 kg)
- Gross weight: 450 lb (204 kg)
- Fuel capacity: 2.5 US gallons (19 litres)
- Powerplant: 1 × Briggs & Stratton two-cylinder four stroke lawnmower engine, 18 hp (13 kW)

Performance

- Cruise speed: 55 mph (89 km/h, 48 kn)
- Stall speed: 26 mph (42 km/h, 23 kn)
- Range: 104 mi (167 km, 90 nmi)
- g limits: +6.6/-3.3
- Maximum glide ratio: 13:1 at 35 mph
- Rate of climb: 500 ft/min (2.5 m/s)

Avionics

- none

== See also ==
Aircraft of comparable role, configuration, and era

- Preceptor N3 Pup
- J-3 Kitten
- Light Miniature Aircraft LM-1
- Belite Ultra Cub
- Rocky Mountain Wings Ridge Runner
- Anglin J6 Karatoo
- Norman Aviation J6 Karatoo
- Wood Sky Pup
- Team Mini-Max Hi-MAX
- Fisher FP-202 Koala
