= Denney Kitfox =

Homebuilt aircraft family by Denney Aerocraft

Kitfox
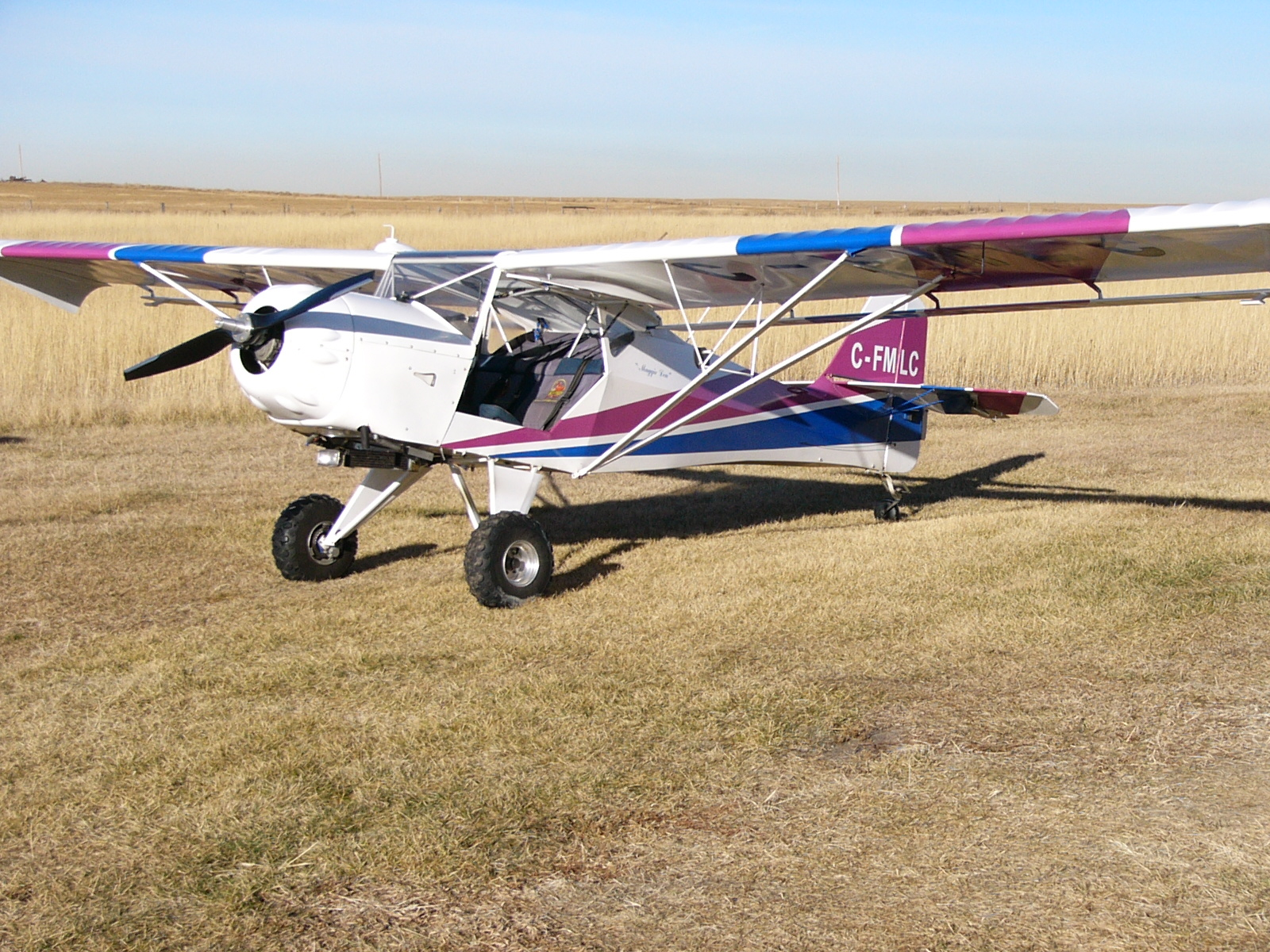
- Denney Kitfox Model 2

General information
- Type: Kit aircraft
- National origin: USA
- Manufacturer: Denney Aerocraft; SkyStar Aircraft; Kitfox Aircraft
- Designer: Dan Denney
- Number built: 4500+ kits delivered

History
- Manufactured: 1984–present
- Introduction date: 1984
- First flight: November 1984
- Developed into: Aeropro Eurofox, Apollo Fox; Rocky Mountain Wings Ridge Runner

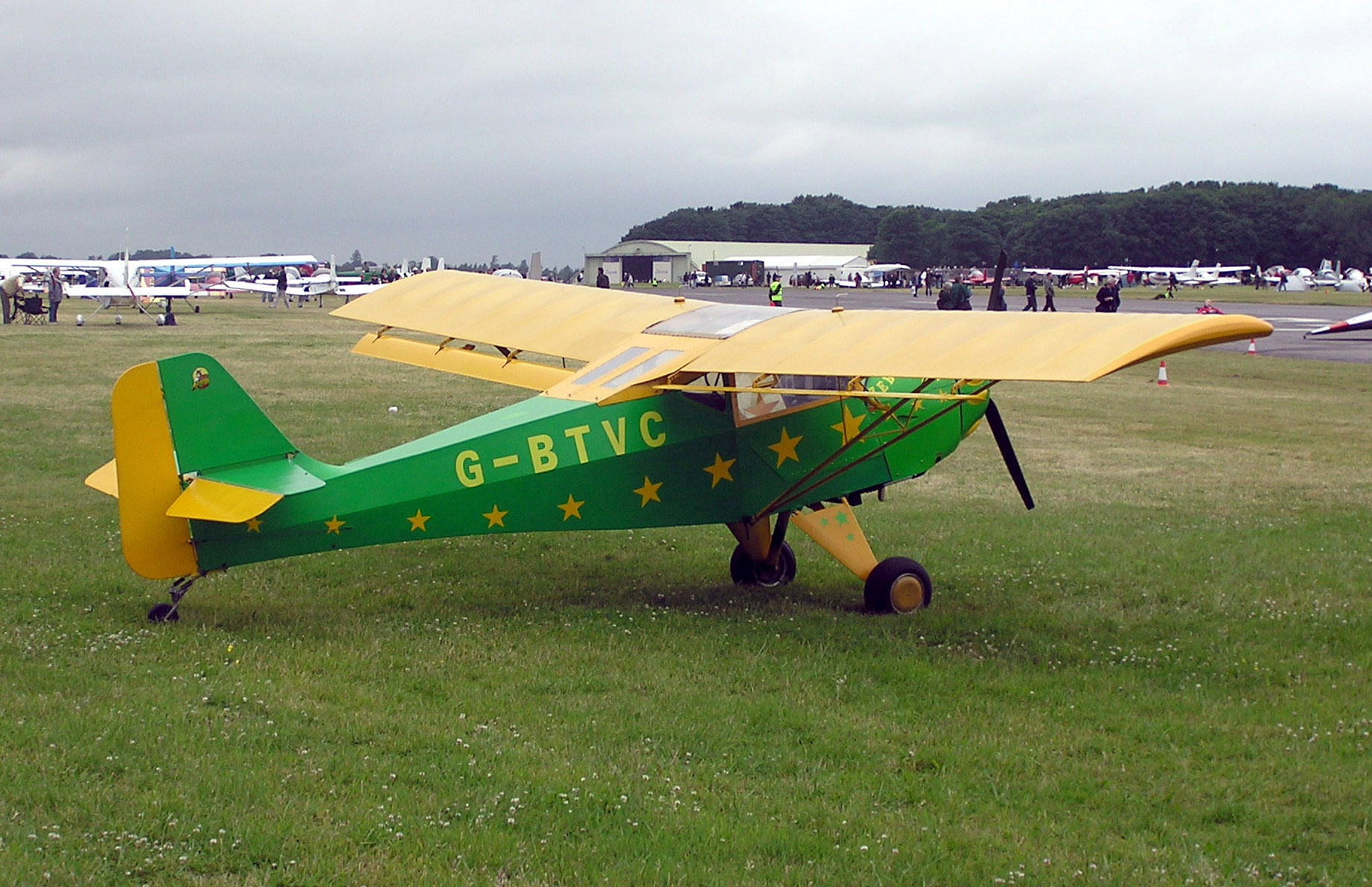
Denney Kitfox Model 2, built in 1992

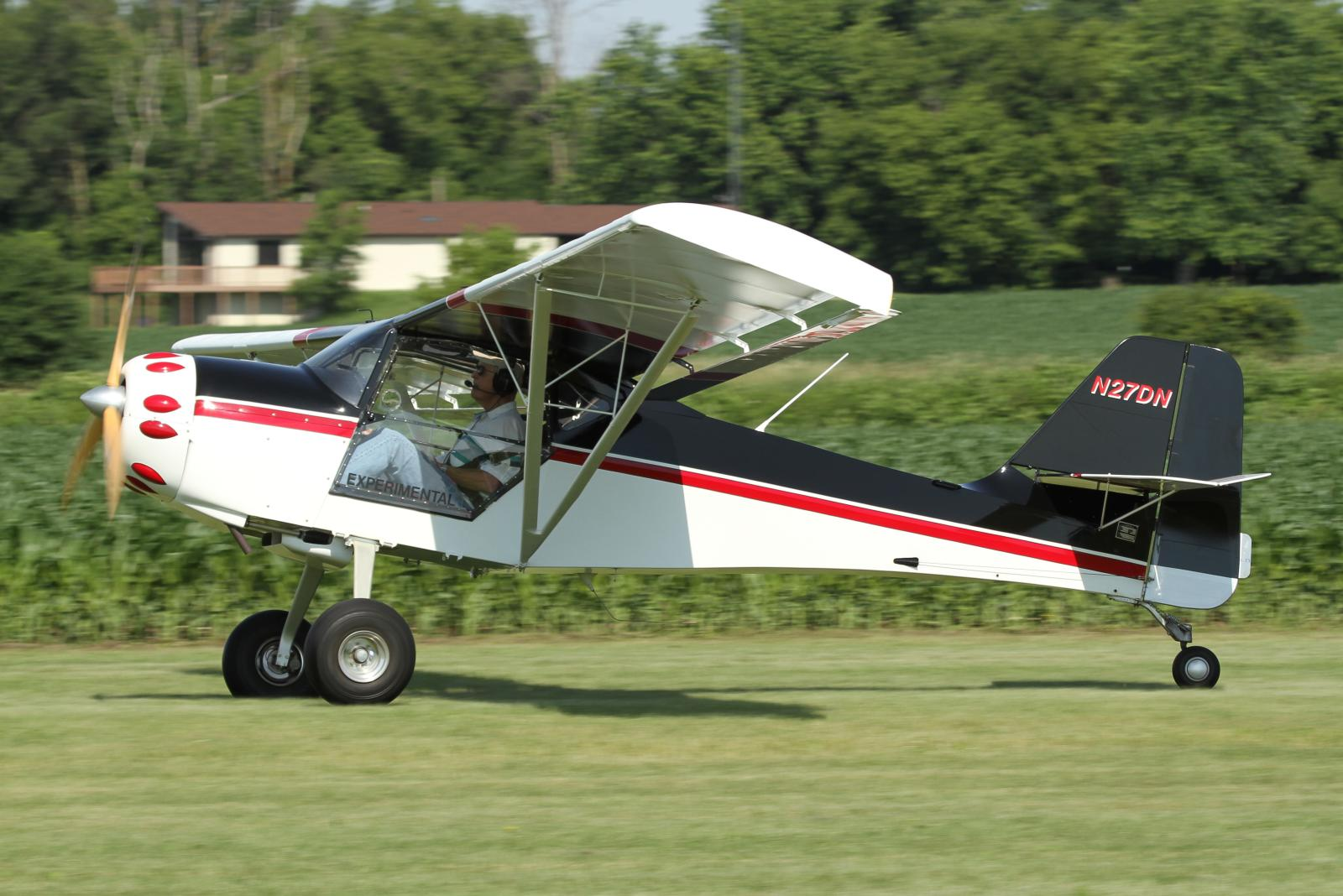
Denney Kitfox Model 3, built in 1993

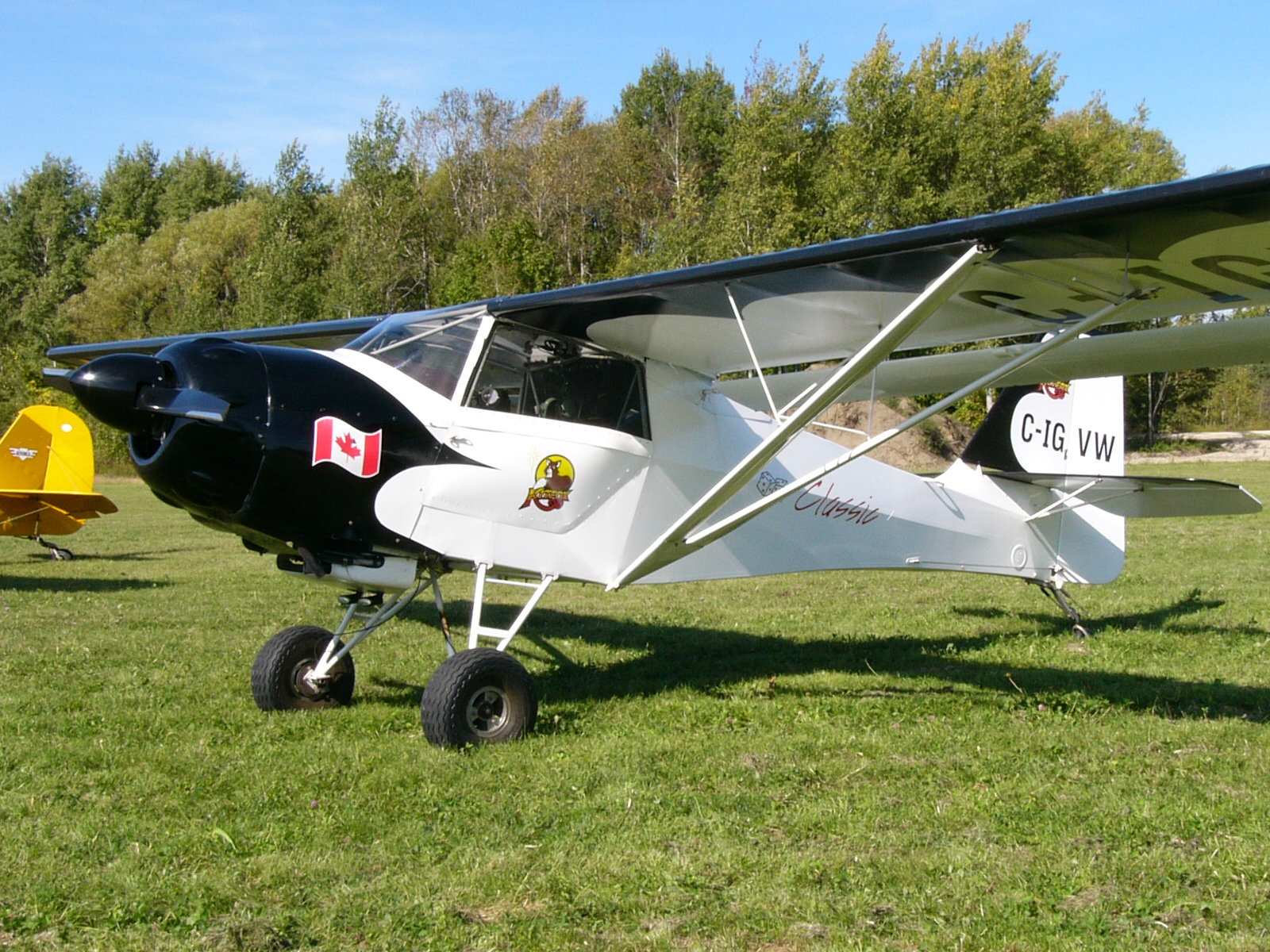
A Skystar Kitfox Model 4 registered as a Canadian Advanced Ultra-light Aeroplane.

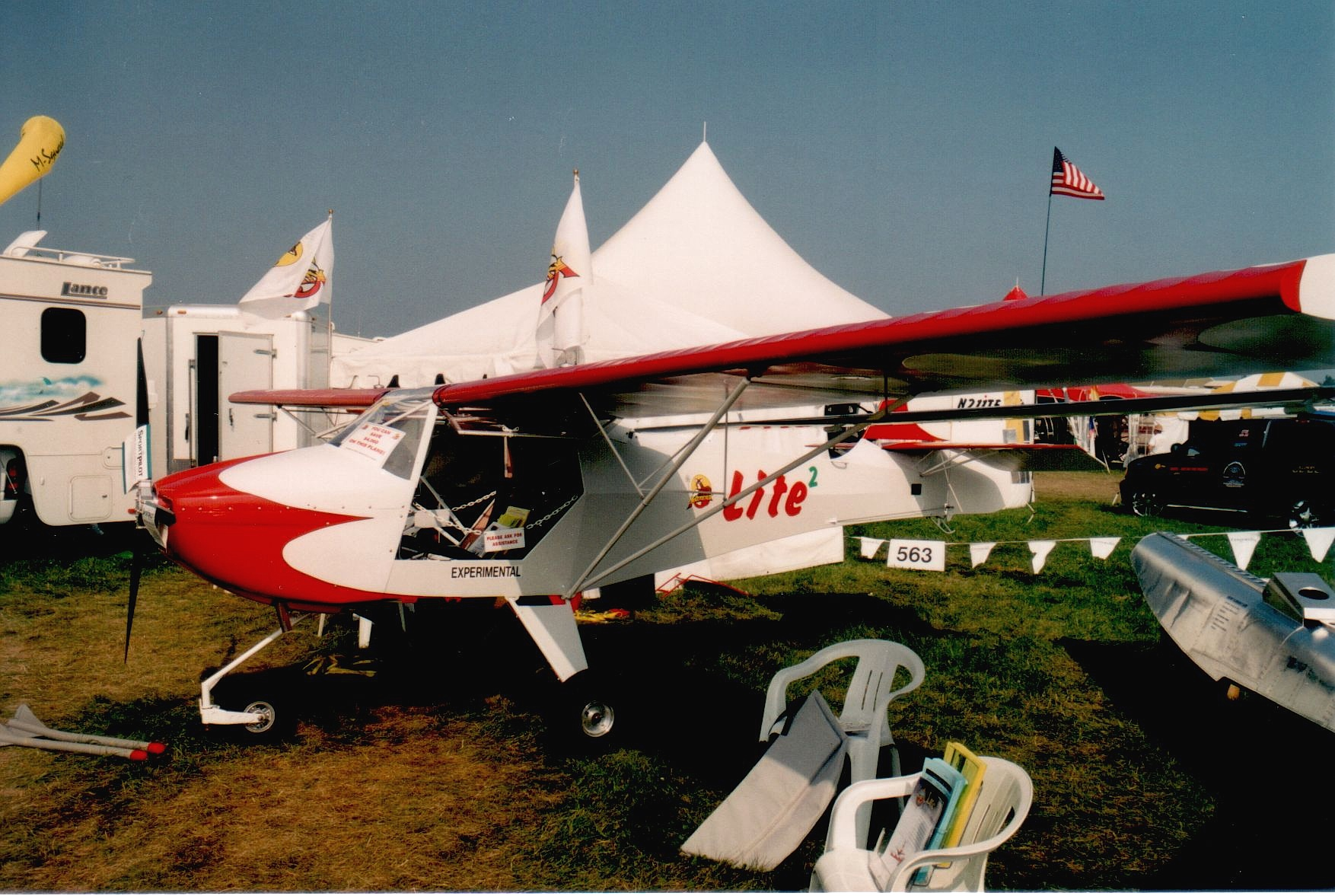
A Skystar Kitfox Lite^{2} at Oshkosh 2001

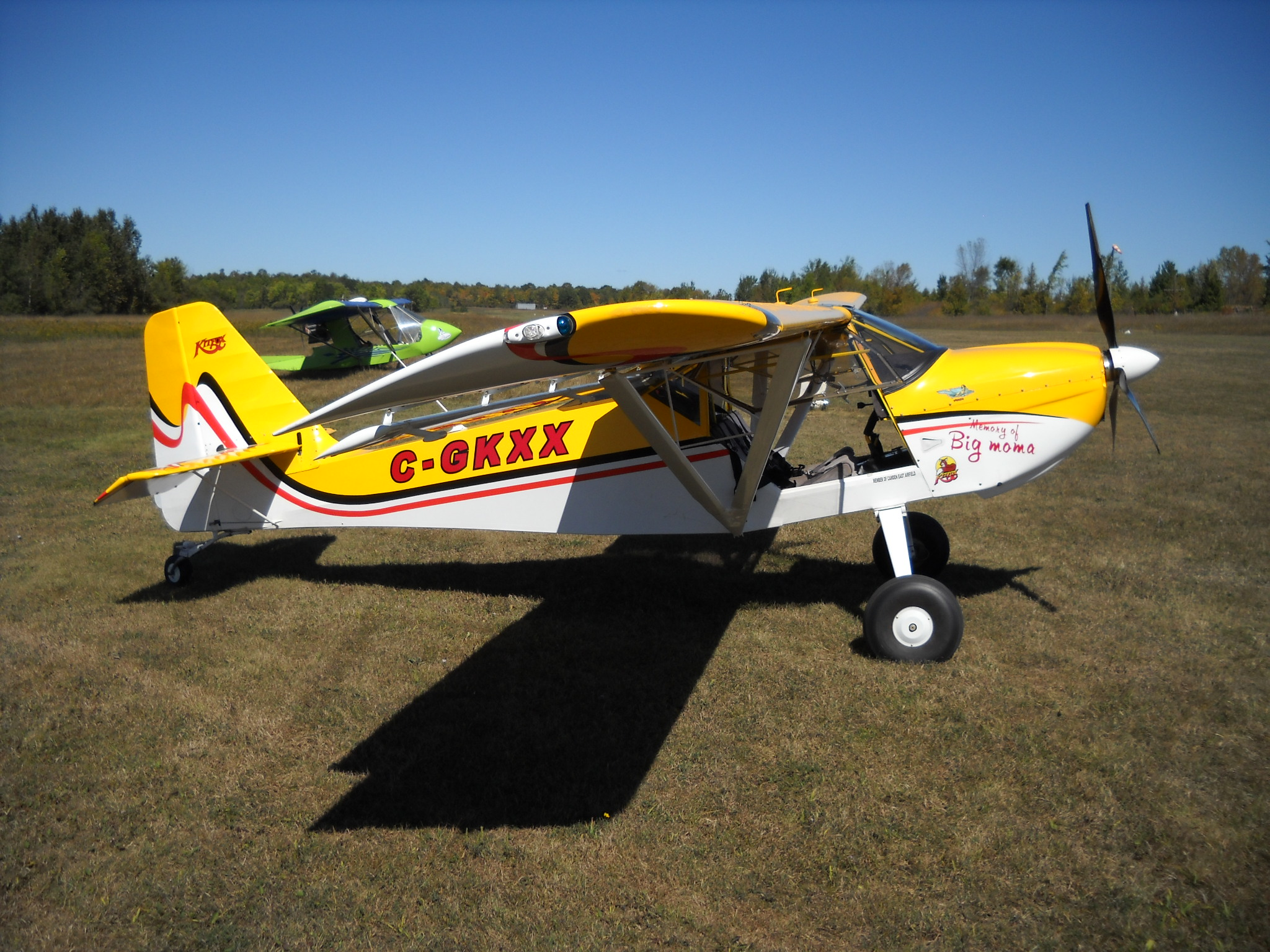
SkyStar Kitfox Series 6

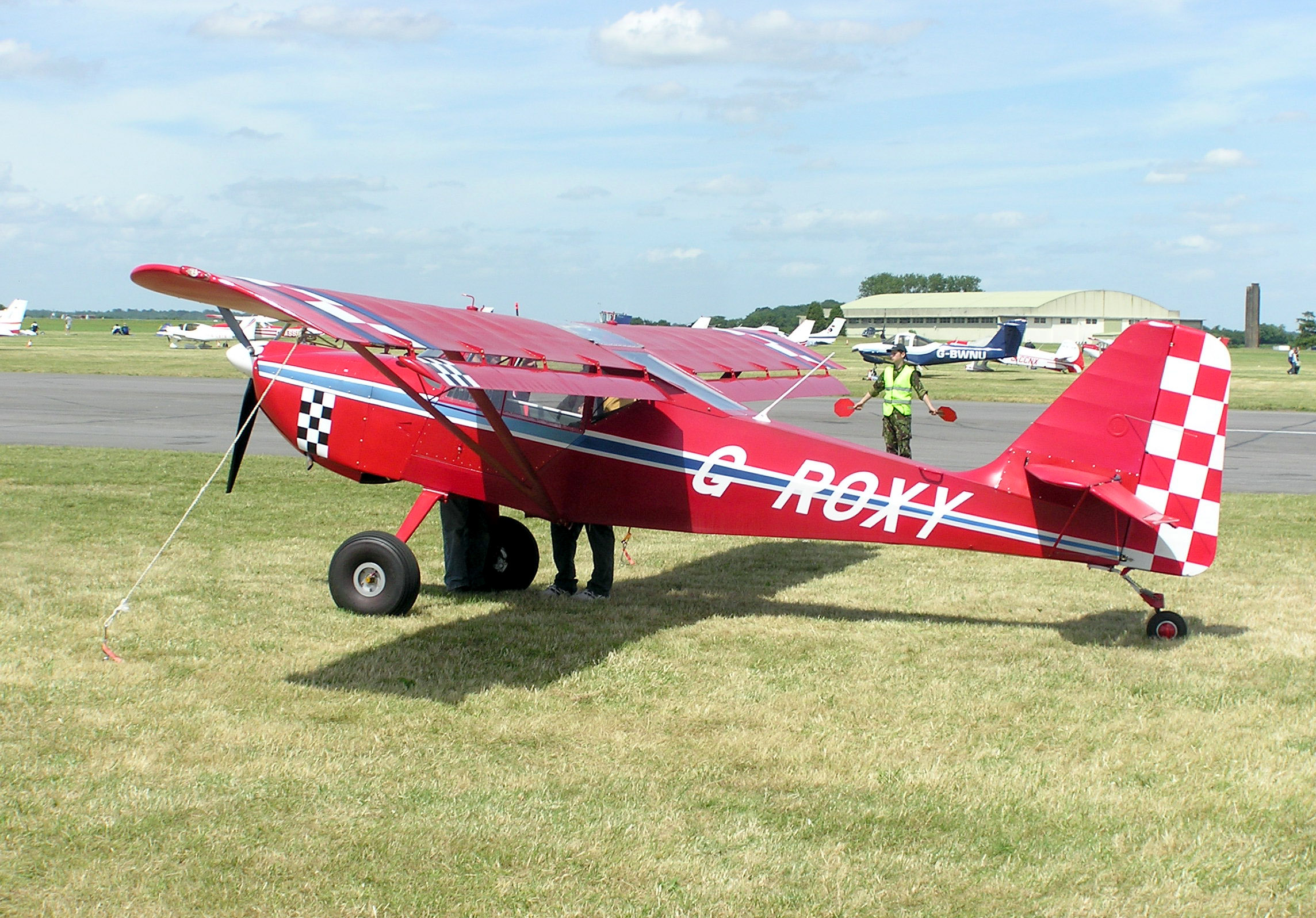
SkyStar Kitfox Series 7, built in 2004

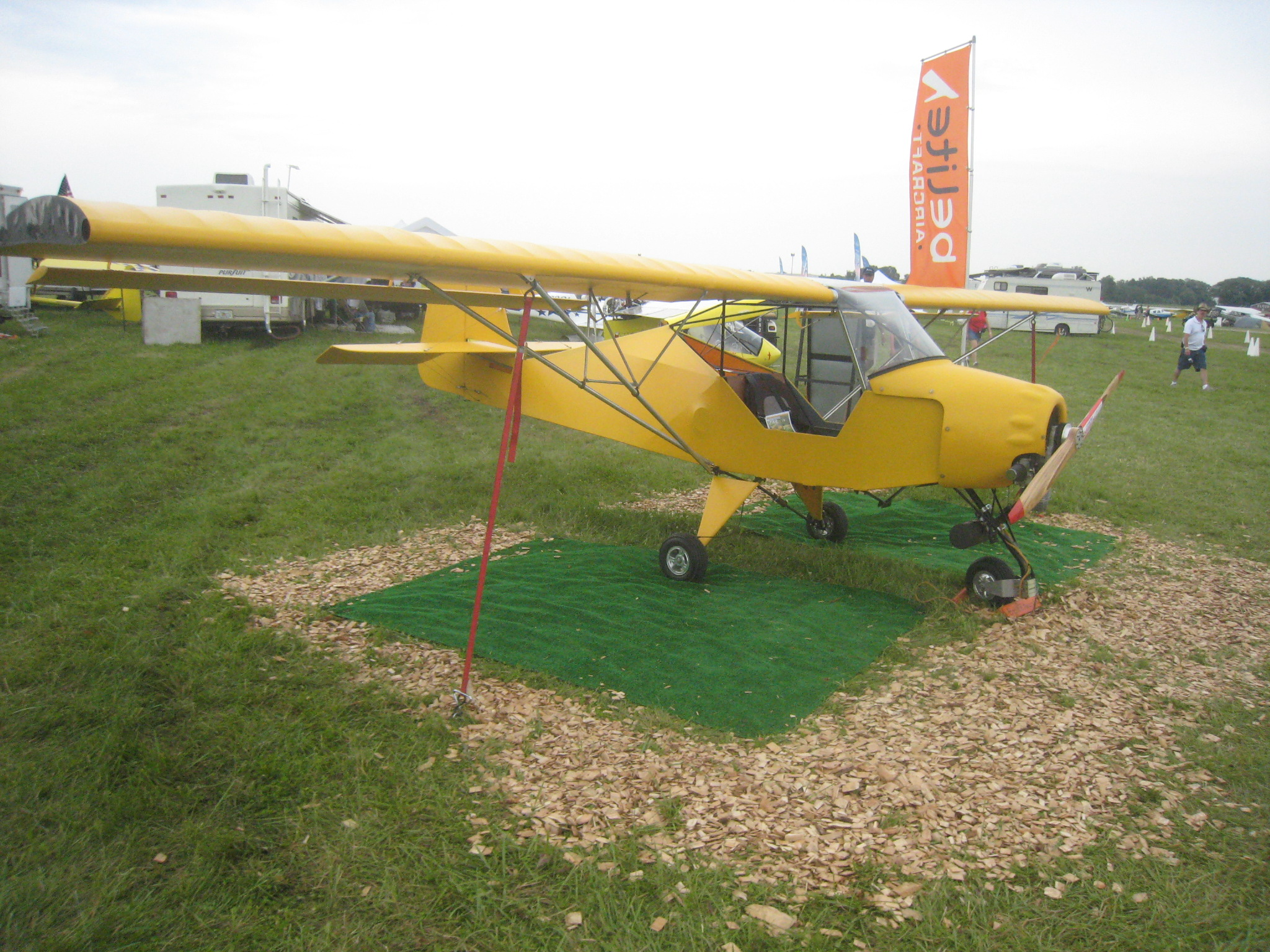
A Belite ultralight

The Denney Kitfox is a series of small side-by-side, two-seat, high-wing, single engine kit aircraft, designed and originally manufactured by Dan Denney and his company Denney Aerocraft of Boise, Idaho, United States. The aircraft is amateur-built and not type-certified. Over 4500 kits have been delivered in 42 countries.

A derivative of the Avid Flyer, the Kitfox was an early kit plane to feature quickly-folding wings that greatly simplify carriage and storage. The appeal of the aircraft was that it could be built in a two-car garage. Then it would be towed to the airport with the wings folded. The landing gear may be easily converted to floats or skis.

== Development and history ==
First flown in November 1984 from the Denney Aerocraft factory in Boise, the Model 1 Kitfox was a two-seat STOL taildragger aircraft capable of flying from unimproved strips. The design was originally intended to use a new radial engine then in development and the early Kitfoxes had round cowls with bumps to accommodate the cylinder heads. Although this radial engine did not materialize, and a Rotax two-stroke engine was adapted instead, the "retro" radial cowling proved popular and was retained on many models. In 1984 a total of six Model 1 Kitfoxes were delivered and then the model range was expanded to include the improved Models 2, 3, 4, and Classic 4.

In June 1992 Denney Aerocraft sold the rights to the design to SkyStar Aircraft. Skystar started work on a new aircraft, the Kitfox Series 5. This aircraft was designed to be larger, with an increased useful load, cabin and cargo space, and to use certified aircraft engines. The Series 5 was produced as a conventional landing gear-equipped aircraft with the names Outback and Safari and also as a tricycle gear aircraft, the Vixen and Voyager. An employee consortium took over SkyStar Aircraft in January 2000, and this reorganized company launched the Kitfox Series 6. Later in 2000 the company also introduced the Kitfox "Lite Squared", a lightened version of the Kitfox Classic 4, as a two-seat ultralight trainer for the single-seat ultralight Kitfox Lite.

In 2002, SkyStar introduced the Kitfox Series 7. This aircraft can cruise at speeds in excess of 150 miles per hour (241 km/h), with a service ceiling above 25,000 feet (7,620 m). The Series 7 design conformed to the then-proposed Federal Aviation Administration Light Sport Aircraft category better than did the Lite Squared and it became the company's main model. As the LSA rules were further developed and gross weights increased, it became evident that a special version of the Kitfox Series 7, to be known as the Kitfox Sport, would not be needed and that all three Kitfoxes then in production — the Lite, Classic 4 and Series 7 — would meet the revised LSA category definition.

In late 2005 SkyStar Aircraft filed for bankruptcy. In April 2006, the assets of Skystar were purchased by Kitfox Aircraft, a newly formed company owned by John and Debra McBean. John McBean is a former SkyStar employee, having left the company in 2003.

== Variants ==
Model 1
Original 1984 model with radial engine cowl and 64 hp (48 kW) Rotax 532 as the standard engine. A total of 257 kits were produced.

Model 2
The larger, wider Kitfox Model 2 was introduced in 1989 and available with the 64 hp (48 kW) Rotax 582 engine. The gross weight was increased to 950 lb (431 kg). 490 were produced.

Model 3
The Kitfox Model 3 features structural changes that were designed to improve flight characteristics and provide a better platform for more powerful engines including the 80 hp (60 kW) Rotax 912. A total of 466 were produced.

Model 4-1050
The Kitfox Model 4 was a new design introduced in 1991. It incorporated a laminar flow airfoil, new flaperon design, metal flaperon attach brackets and a new 2:1 differential aileron control system. The gross weight of the Kitfox Model 4-1050 was the same as the Model 3, 1,050 lb (476 kg). The Model 4 standard engines include the 80 hp (60 kW) Rotax 912 and the 100 hp (75 kW) Rotax 912S. 322 were built.

Model 4-1200 (Classic IV)
The Kitfox Model 4-1200, also known as the Classic 4, is the final version of the original 1984 Denney Kitfox. Introduced in 1991, the Classic 4 has stronger lift struts, gear legs, and fuselage carry-through tubes, which allow a gross weight of 1,200 lb (544 kg). The vertical stabilizer and rudder height was increased by 10 inches (25 cm), and the rudder width was increased by 2 inches (5 cm).

Model 4 Speedster
A variant of the Classic 4 with a shorter wing for a higher cruise speed and roll rate.

Kitfox XL
A lightweight variant of the Classic 4 introduced in 1994, with the 50 hp (37 kW) Rotax 503 as the standard power plant. The aircraft was intended as an ultralight trainer, but did not sell well.

Kitfox Lite
Single-seat ultralight design for the United States market by Skystar Aircraft. The Lite features similar styling to larger Kitfoxes, including the radial-style cowling, folding wings and Junkers flaperons. Original engine was a special model of the 2si 460-F35 two-cylinder, two-stroke powerplant converted to free-air cooling and direct drive, producing 28 hp (21 kW)

Kitfox Lite^{2}
An upgraded variant of the Kitfox XL, introduced in 2001. Powered by a 50 hp (37 kW) Rotax 503, the Lite^{2} also features the popular radial-style cowling, flaperons and a welded steel tube fuselage, all covered in Stits Aircraft Polyfiber aircraft fabric. The aircraft was a success and sold well as both a complete aircraft and as a kit plane.

Series 5 (Safari, Vixen, Outback, Voyager)
Intended to use Continental and Lycoming certified engines in addition to the Rotax 912 engines, the Series 5 was introduced in 1994. The tailwheel version was named the Safari and the tricycle gear version was named the Vixen. The Vixen incorporated a swept tail, which was a cosmetic change that did not affect performance. Gross weight was initially 1,400 lb (635 kg), increased in 1995 to 1,550 lb (703 kg). In 1998, the marketing name of the Safari was changed to Outback and the Vixen to Voyager.

Series 5 Speedster
A variant of the Series 5 with a shorter wing for a higher cruise speed.

Series 6
Introduced in 2000, the Series 6 has a useful load of up to 800 lb (363 kg), a range of over 700 miles (1,127 km) and cruising speeds of over 120 mph (193 km/h). The aircraft can be converted from tricycle gear to tailwheel and back again.

Series 7
The Series 7 introduced a number of refinements, including a cruise speed of over 120 mph (193 km/h), a 700 miles (1,127 km) range and carry a useful load of 700 lb (318 kg). When equipped with the Rotax 914 turbo-charged engine, the aircraft has a service ceiling of 25,000 feet (7,600 m). Other engines available include Continental, Lycoming, Rotax 912S, Rotec R2800, Jabiru 3300 and the Rotax 915is engine. In the United States Light Sport Aircraft category it is marketed as the Super Sport. The construction time from the factory-supplied kit is estimated at 1000 hours.

Series 7 STI
A version of the Series 7 with a larger airfoil to increase STOL (short take-off and landing) performance.

Series 7 Speedster
A version of the Series 7 with shorter wings to increase speed much like the Series 4 Speedster.

Kitfox SLSA
Version of the Series 7 for the light sport aircraft market, with 1,320 lb (599 kg) gross take-off weight and the 100 hp (75 kW) Rotax 912ULS engine. The model is on the Federal Aviation Administration's list of approved United States Light Sport Aircraft.

PACI Skyfox
In 1987, the Philippine Aircraft Company Inc (PACI) signed a deal to manufacture and distribute the Kitfox in the Western Pacific area. Three examples had been built by 1990 with another five under construction at the time. Potential markets included aerial spraying and for the Philippine Integrated Police Force.

=== Derivative designs ===
Since early 2009, Belite Aircraft, a new company based in Wichita, Kansas has produced the Belite Aircraft Superlite derivative of the Kitfox Lite single-seat ultralight design. Belite extensively redesigned the aircraft to incorporate carbon fiber reinforced polymer wings, struts, spars and ribs, lowering the empty weight to 245 lb (111 kg).

Belite Aircraft "has acquired the production rights to a previously designed aircraft, the Kitfox Lite" and has "acquired the tooling, existing parts and manufacturing rights to the aircraft in March 2009. As a condition of the transaction, they agreed to rebrand the airplane to prevent any confusion with the larger, two-place light sport Kitfox". It has a metal airframe and is covered in poly-fiber fabric.

In Europe, the Apollo Fox and Aeropro Eurofox are based upon the Kitfox, with their Junkers flaps and folding wings. Both are Rotax-powered, side-by-side two-seaters, and are available either as taildraggers or with tricycle gear. The Light Aircraft Association's chief engineer, Francis Donaldson, tested a Eurofox and declared that "the manufacturer Aeropro has refined and greatly improved a kit plane classic".

== Specifications (Kitfox Classic IV) ==
Data from Kitfox Aircraft Website

General characteristics

- Crew: one
- Capacity: one passenger
- Length: 18 ft 5 in (5.6 m)
- Wingspan: 32 ft 0 in (9.76 m)
- Height: 5 ft 8 in (1.73 m) (tailwheel)
- Wing area: 132 sq ft (12.28 m^{2})
- Empty weight: 650 lb (295 kg)
- Gross weight: 1,200 lb (544 kg)
- Powerplant: 1 × Rotax 912 , 80 hp (60 kW)

Performance

- Maximum speed: 117 mph (190 km/h, 102 kn)
- Cruise speed: 110 mph (178 km/h, 96 kn)
- Stall speed: 37 mph (60 km/h, 32 kn)
- Never exceed speed: 125 mph (203 km/h, 109 kn)
- Range: 785 mi (1,272 km, 682 nmi)
- Rate of climb: 1,200 ft/min (6.1 m/s)
- Wing loading: 9.09 lb/sq ft (44.3 kg/m^{2})
- Power/mass: 15 lb/hp (0.11 kW/kg)

== See also ==
Related development

- Flying K Sky Raider
- Rocky Mountain Wings Ridge Runner

Aircraft of comparable role, configuration, and era

- Best Off Skyranger
- Birdman Chinook
- Carlson Sparrow
- Dart Skycycle
- Fisher Dakota Hawk
- Fisher FP-606 Sky Baby
- Just Escapade
- Just Superstol
- Lockwood Drifter
- Spectrum Beaver
- Wings of Freedom Flitplane
