= Wood Sky Pup =

American single-seat ultralight aircraft

General information
- Type: Ultralight aircraft
- National origin: United States
- Designer: Stephen K. Wood
- Status: Plans available
- Number built: 350

History
- Manufactured: 1982-present
- Introduction date: 1982
- First flight: 1980

The Wood Sky Pup is an American single-seat, high wing, cantilever, single engine, conventional landing gear ultralight aircraft that was designed by Stephen K. Wood of Whitewater, Colorado for amateur construction.

== Design and development ==
Introduced in 1982, the Sky Pup is a single seater designed as an FAR 103 Ultralight Vehicles compliant aircraft with an empty weight within that category's 254 lb (115 kg) empty weight limit. The aircraft was intended to require the minimum financial investment and the designer intended that the airframe would be able to be completed for US$1000 using locally available materials. Cliche reported in 2001 that Sky Pups had been completed for US$2000, including the engine. Its shape has been described as imitating the 1930s Aeronca C-2 "flying bathtub".

The airframe is constructed from Douglas fir and styrofoam, all covered in Dacron or polyester fabric. The wing is a three-piece design, allowing quick disassembly for transport or storage. The landing gear suspension is made from maple wood. The Sky Pup can be built with an open cockpit or fully enclosed, allowing flying in cooler weather. The Sky Pup is available as plans only. The power range specified is 18 to 28 hp (13 to 21 kW), with the largest engine specified the 28 hp (21 kW) Rotax 277. The 20 hp (15 kW) 2si 215, 28 hp (21 kW) Hirth F-33 and 22 hp (16 kW) Zenoah G-25 have also been used.

The design was professionally engineered and incorporates a very clean cantilever wing that results in a 12:1 glide ratio. The control system is two-axis, using only elevator and rudder controls, roll being introduced by rudder via a generous dihedral angle. The elevator is stick-controlled, while the rudder is controlled via conventional aircraft pedals. The aircraft is stall and spin proof. Reported construction times are 450–600 hours.

Plans were initially sold direct by the designer and, in the early 2000s, by the Vintage Ultra and Lightplane Association. Later the designer's son marketed the plans and this is the current source.

== Specifications (Sky Pup) ==
Data from Brochure, Cliche, and Kitplanes

General characteristics

- Crew: one
- Length: 15 ft 11 in (4.85 m)
- Wingspan: 31 ft 0 in (9.45 m)
- Height: 4 ft 4 in (1.32 m)
- Wing area: 130 sq ft (12 m^{2})
- Empty weight: 195 lb (88 kg) with Cuyuna 215RR
- Gross weight: 400 lb (181 kg)
- Fuel capacity: 5 US gallons (19 litres)
- Powerplant: 1 × Zenoah G-25 , 22 hp (16 kW)
- Propellers: 2-bladed wooden

Performance

- Cruise speed: 55 mph (89 km/h, 48 kn)
- Stall speed: 26 mph (42 km/h, 23 kn)
- Never exceed speed: 69 mph (111 km/h, 60 kn)
- Range: 150 mi (240 km, 130 nmi)
- Rate of climb: 450 ft/min (2.3 m/s)
- Lift-to-drag: 12:1

== See also ==
Related development

- Aeronca C-2 (similar configuration and appearance, though a half-century earlier)

Aircraft of comparable role, configuration, and era

- Avid Champion
- Dart Skycycle
- Hipp's Superbirds J-3 Kitten
- Preceptor N3 Pup
- Belite Ultra Cub
- Ultravia Pelican
- Rocky Mountain Wings Ridge Runner
- Anglin J6 Karatoo
- Norman Aviation J6 Karatoo
- Team Mini-Max Hi-MAX
- Fisher FP-202 Koala
- Light Miniature Aircraft LM-1
