= Hipp's Superbirds J-3 Kitten =

Family of single-engined, single seat aircraft

J-3 Kitten
- J-3 Kitten at Caboolture Airfield.

General information
- Type: Ultralight aircraft
- National origin: United States
- Manufacturer: Hipp's Superbirds
- Designer: Jesse Anglin

History
- First flight: 1986

The Hipp's Superbirds J-3 Kitten and related designs are a family of single-engine, single seat, high wing conventional landing gear-equipped aircraft available in kit form or as plans from Hipp's Superbirds of Saluda, North Carolina.

The J-3, J-4 and Reliant designs are intended to have empty weights under 254 lb (115 kg), and fit into the US ultralight category. The remaining designs are heavier and fit into the US Experimental - Amateur-built category.

== Design and development ==
The Hipp's J-3, J-5 and Reliant are all very similar aircraft developed from the original J-4, and differing only in fuselage design and wingspan.

All aircraft in the series have a 4130 steel tube fuselage and tail assembly. The wings are built from wood, and both the fuselage and wings are covered with doped aircraft fabric. The engine cowlings are composite. Floats and skis are available. Construction times are estimated as 300 hours from the kit and 800 hours from plans.

The wings of all the aircraft in the series are detachable for transport or storage.

The aircraft in the series are described by reviewer Andre Cliche as being "docile, predictable and forgiving aircraft that can be handled safely by novice pilots."

== Operational history ==
The Reliant was first displayed at Oshkosh in 1987 where it received the Grand Champion and Charles Lindbergh awards.

== Variants ==
J-3 Kitten
Enclosed cockpit with cut-down rear turtle deck, standard empty weight 250 lb (113 kg), wingspan of 30.0 ft (9.14 m), standard engine Rotax 277 of 28 hp (21 kW). First flight 1986.
J-4 Sportster
Open cockpit parasol wing with flat rear turtle deck, standard empty weight 242 lb (110 kg), wingspan of 28.0 ft (8.53 m), standard engine Rotax 277 of 28 hp (21 kW). First flight 1986.

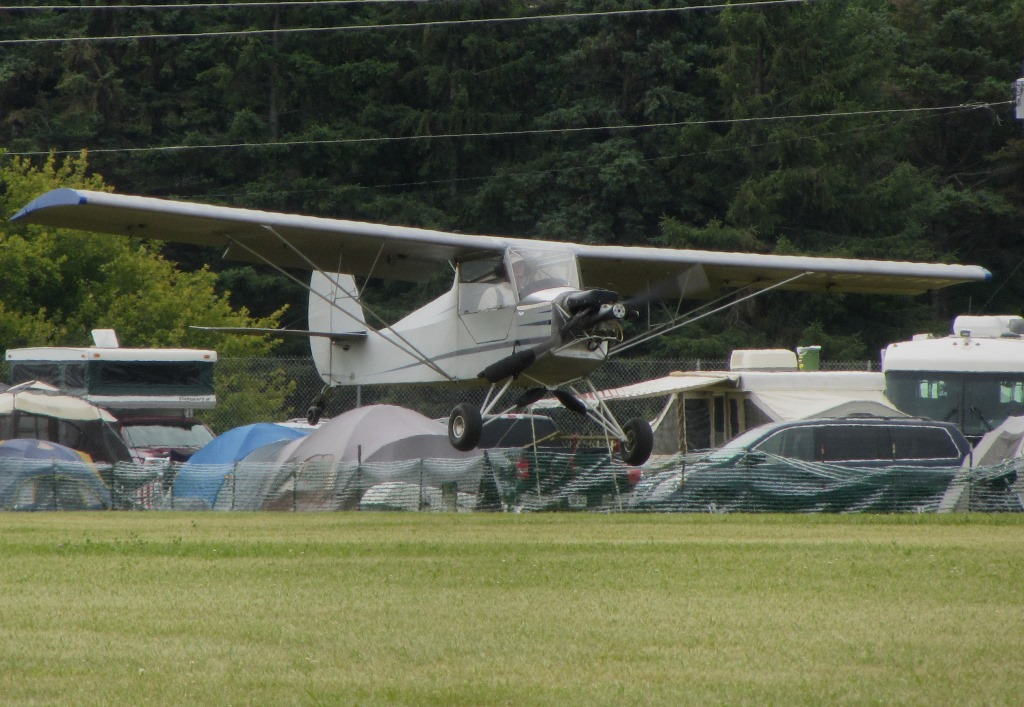
J-5 Super Kitten

J-5 Super Kitten
Enclosed cockpit with cut-down rear turtle deck, standard empty weight 250 lb (113 kg), wingspan of 30.0 ft (9.14 m), standard engine Rotax 447 of 40 hp (30 kW). First flight 1986. Includes extra fuel, landing gear shock absorbers, wheel pants and brakes.
Super Sportster
Open cockpit parasol wing with flat rear turtle deck, standard empty weight 260 lb (118 kg), wingspan of 28.0 ft (8.53 m), standard engine Rotax 447 of 40 hp (30 kW). First flight 1986.
Reliant
Enclosed cockpit with fast-back rear turtle deck, standard empty weight 254 lb (115 kg), wingspan of 30.0 ft (9.14 m), standard engine Rotax 277 of 28 hp (21 kW). First flight 1987.

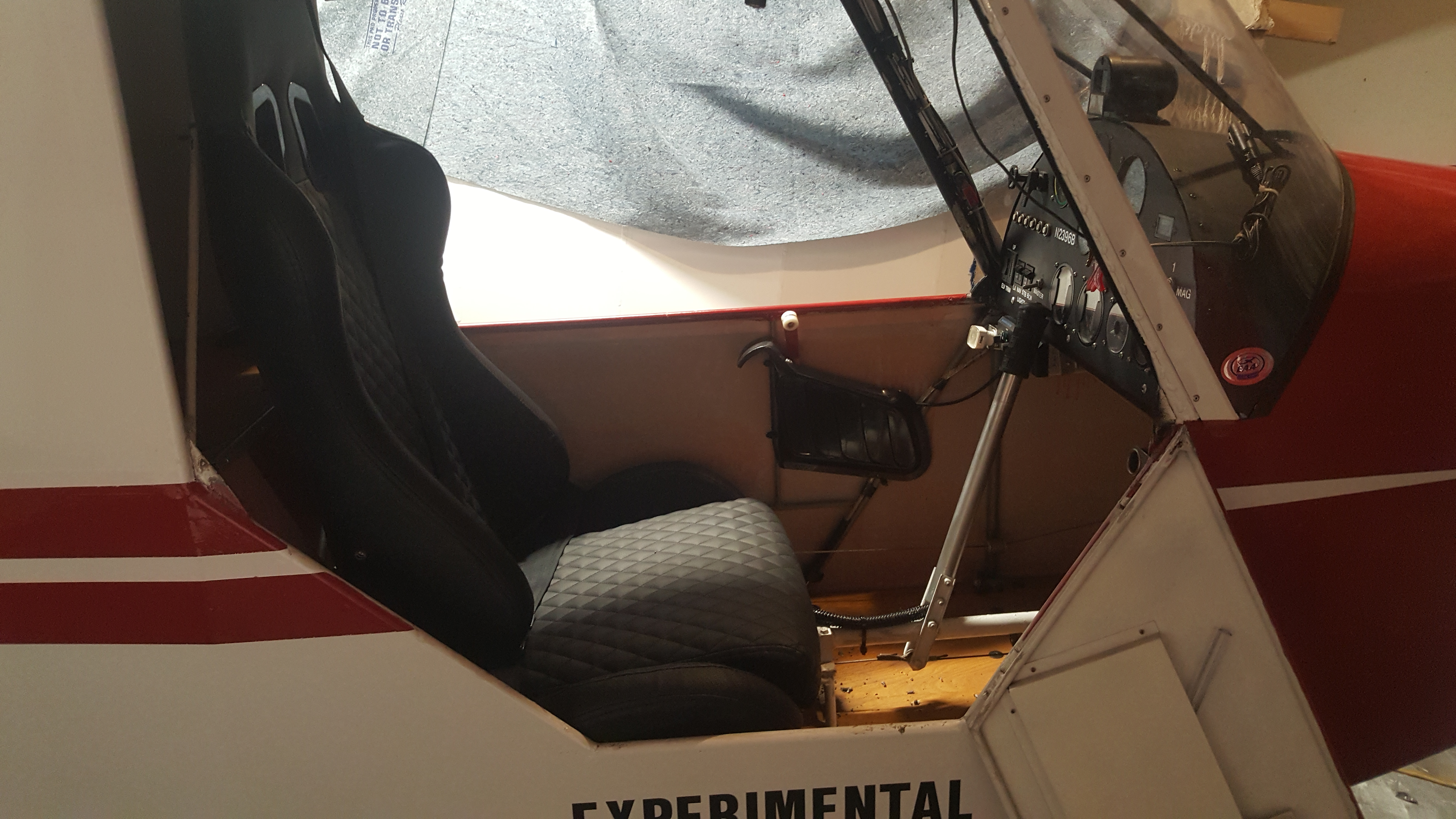
2001 Hipps Reliant SX interior

Reliant SX
Enclosed cockpit with fast-back rear turtle deck, standard empty weight 285 lb (129 kg), wingspan of 30.0 ft (9.14 m), standard engine Rotax 447 of 40 hp (30 kW). Includes extra fuel, landing gear shock absorbers, and wheel pants. First flight 1987.

== Specifications (J-3 Kitten) ==
Data from Cliche, Kitplanes and Purdy

General characteristics

- Crew: one
- Length: 16 ft 3 in (4.95 m)
- Wingspan: 30 ft 0 in (9.14 m)
- Height: 5 ft 4 in (1.63 m)
- Wing area: 120 sq ft (11 m^{2})
- Empty weight: 250 lb (113 kg)
- Gross weight: 500 lb (227 kg)
- Fuel capacity: 5 US gallons (19 litres)
- Powerplant: 1 × Rotax 277 single cylinder, two stroke aircraft engine, 28 hp (21 kW)

Performance

- Maximum speed: 63 mph (101 km/h, 55 kn)
- Cruise speed: 60 mph (97 km/h, 52 kn)
- Stall speed: 24 mph (39 km/h, 21 kn)
- Range: 140 mi (220 km, 120 nmi)
- Rate of climb: 750 ft/min (3.8 m/s)
- Wing loading: 4.17 lb/sq ft (20.4 kg/m^{2})

Avionics

- none

== See also ==
Aircraft of comparable role, configuration, and era

- Piper J-3 (not in same class (a certified airplane), but the aircraft that the ultralight-class J-3 Kitten imitates in miniature, at 3/4 scale. Kitten is much slower, and about half the power, volume and payload of the Cub, and a fraction of the Cub's weight.)
- Preceptor N3 Pup (by a former Hipps worker)
- Belite Ultra Cub
- Ultravia Pelican
- Rocky Mountain Wings Ridge Runner
- Anglin J6 Karatoo
- Norman Aviation J6 Karatoo
- Wood Sky Pup
- Team Mini-Max Hi-MAX
- Fisher FP-202 Koala
- Light Miniature Aircraft LM-1
