= Anglin J6 Karatoo =

Australian light airplane

J6 Karatoo
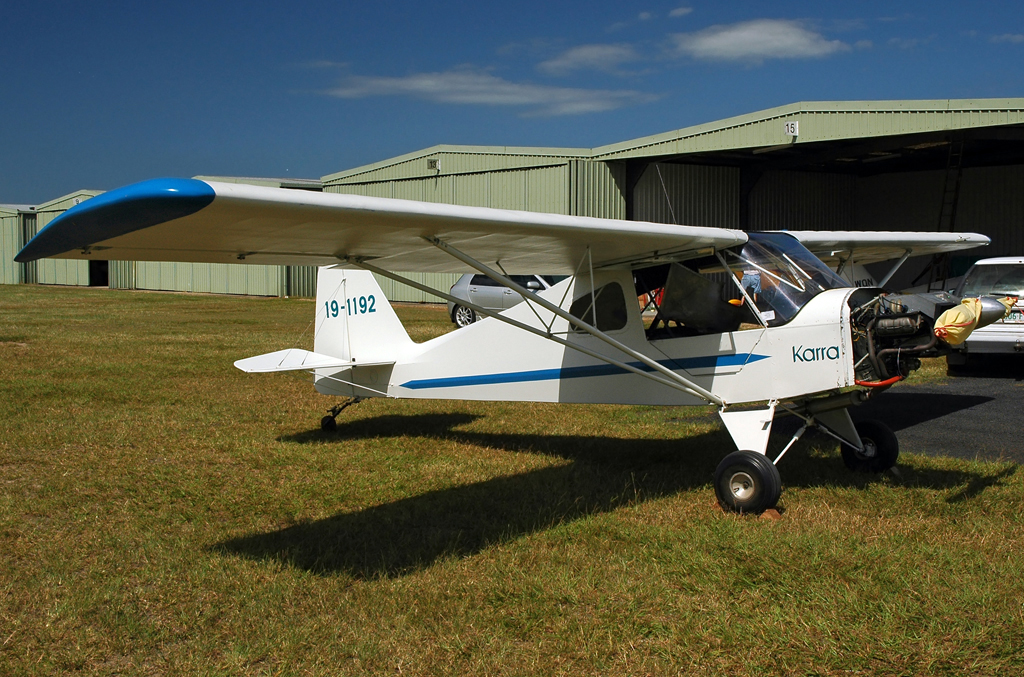

General information
- Type: Ultralight aircraft and Light-sport aircraft
- National origin: Australia
- Manufacturer: Amax Engineering; Skyway Aircraft; Serenity Aviation
- Designer: Jesse Anglin
- Status: In production (2012)

History
- Introduction date: 1982
- First flight: 1982
- Variants: Norman Aviation J6 Karatoo; Buzzman L'il Buzzard

The Anglin J6 Karatoo is an Australian ultralight and light-sport aircraft that was designed by Jesse Anglin and introduced in 1982. Over the years the J6 Karatoo has been produced by several different manufacturers, including Amax Engineering of Donvale, Victoria, Skyway Aircraft and is currently built by Serenity Aviation of Australia. The aircraft is supplied as plans or as a kit for amateur construction.

== Design and development ==
The aircraft features a strut-braced high-wing, a two-seats-in-side-by-side configuration enclosed cockpit with doors, fixed conventional landing gear and a single engine in tractor configuration.

The aircraft fuselage is made from welded 4130 steel tubing, with its wings usually made with a wooden structure, all covered in doped aircraft fabric. Its 32.5 ft (9.9 m) span wing employs a Clark Y airfoil, has an area of 146 sq ft (13.6 m^{2}) and optional flaps. The wing is supported by V-struts and jury struts and is constructed with marine plywood ribs and a D-cell leading edge, although a metal wing was under development. Wing folding for ground transport or storage is optional. Floats for water operations are an option.

The Karatoo can accept engines in the range of 50 to 100 hp (37 to 75 kW), depending on the model. Engines used include the 50 hp (37 kW) Rotax 503 and the 64 hp (48 kW) Rotax 582 two-strokes as well as the 80 hp (60 kW) Rotax 912UL, the 100 hp (75 kW) Rotax 912ULS, 85 hp (63 kW) Jabiru 2200, 71 to 100 hp (53 to 75 kW) Subaru EA engine, 90 hp (67 kW) Continental C-90 and the 100 hp (75 kW) Continental O-200A four-stroke powerplants.

In 1988 the J6 design was adapted to the Canadian ultralight rules as the Norman Aviation J6 Karatoo and, in 1990, as the Buzzman L'il Buzzard.

== Operational history ==
In August 2012 there were 14 J6 Karatoos registered in the United States with the Federal Aviation Administration in the Experimental - Amateur Built and light-sport categories.

== Variants ==
J6A Karatoo
Initial model with a gross weight of 900 lb (410 kg), commonly powered by a 50 hp (37 kW) Rotax 503. The earliest versions had a solid spruce main spar and later a spruce I beam spar.
J6B Australian Karatoo
Improved model developed by Anglin in conjunction with Max Peters. The J6B has a gross weight of 1,200 lb (540 kg), strengthened landing gear, optional flaps and initially used a 71 to 100 hp (53 to 75 kW) Subaru EA engine automotive conversion powerplant.
J6C Australian Karatoo
Model with a gross weight of 1,200 lb (540 kg), a longer and wider fuselage, with a revised rear fuselage structure.

== Specifications (Serenity J6B Australian Karatoo) ==
Data from Serenity Aviation

General characteristics

- Crew: one
- Capacity: one passenger
- Length: 20 ft 0 in (6.10 m) including propeller and spinner
- Wingspan: 32 ft 6 in (9.91 m)
- Height: 6 ft 10 in (2.08 m)
- Wing area: 146 sq ft (13.6 m^{2})
- Empty weight: 580 lb (263 kg)
- Gross weight: 1,200 lb (544 kg)
- Fuel capacity: 52 litres (11 imp gal; 14 US gal)
- Powerplant: 1 × Continental C-90 four cylinder, air-cooled, four stroke aircraft engine, 90 hp (67 kW)
- Propellers: 2-bladed wooden

Performance

- Maximum speed: 110 kn (130 mph, 200 km/h)
- Cruise speed: 80 kn (92 mph, 150 km/h)
- Stall speed: 40 kn (46 mph, 74 km/h) flaps down
- Never exceed speed: 120 kn (140 mph, 220 km/h)
- Rate of climb: 500 ft/min (2.5 m/s)
- Wing loading: 8.2 lb/sq ft (40 kg/m^{2})

== See also ==
Related development

- Norman Aviation J6 Karatoo

Aircraft of comparable role, configuration, and era

- Hipp's Superbirds J-3 Kitten (Preceptor Pup is designed by a former Hipps worker)
- Preceptor N3 Pup
- Belite Ultra Cub
- Ultravia Pelican
- Rocky Mountain Wings Ridge Runner
- Wood Sky Pup
- Team Mini-Max Hi-MAX
- Fisher FP-202 Koala
- Light Miniature Aircraft LM-1
