= Skycycle =

Skycycle may refer to:

- Skycycle (rock band), an alternative rock band
- SkyCycle (concept), a proposed network of cycle paths in London
- Skycycle X-2, a steam-powered rocket owned by Evel Knievel
- Dart Skycycle, an American aircraft
- Carlson Skycycle, an American aircraft

== See also ==
- Fly Hard Trikes SkyCycle, an American ultralight trike
- Lookout Mountain SkyCycle, an American ultralight trike
