= Team Mini-Max Hi-MAX =

High-Wing version of the Mini-Max 1100R

Hi-MAX
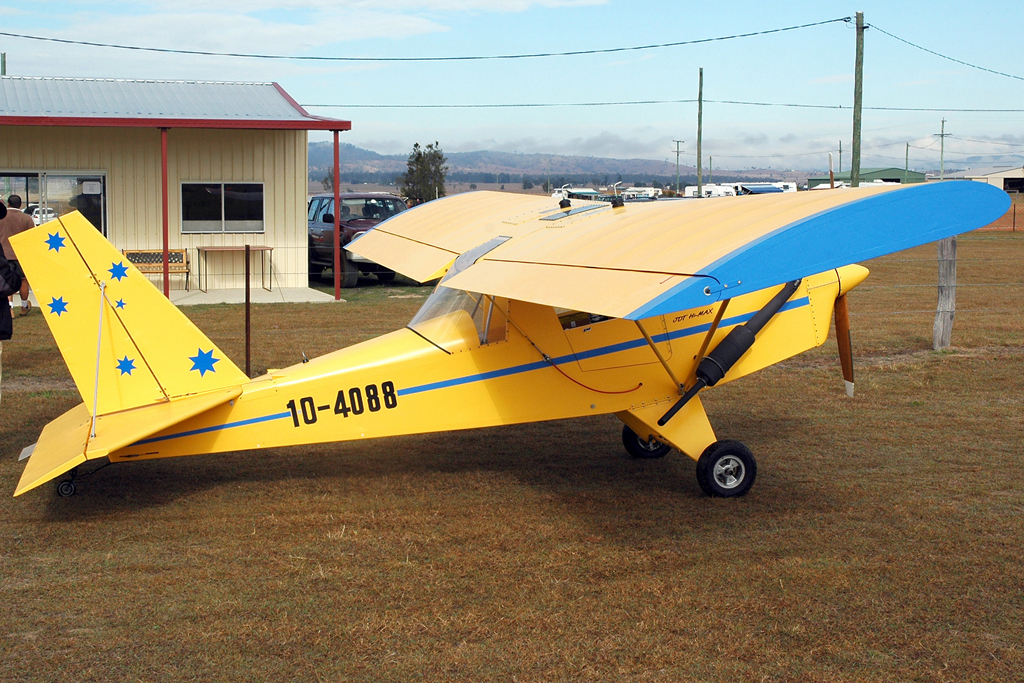

General information
- Type: Kit aircraft
- National origin: United States
- Manufacturer: Mini-Max USA
- Designer: Wayne Ison
- Status: Kits in production
- Number built: more than 277 (2007)

History
- Introduction date: 1987
- First flight: 1987
- Developed from: Mini-MAX
- Variants: 1400Z, 1700R

The Mini-Max USA "Hi-MAX" is a single-seat, high wing, strut-braced, single engine aircraft available in kit form for amateur construction. It first flew in 1987 and is a high wing development of the Mini-MAX, hence its model name.

The Hi-MAX was originally produced by TEAM Incorporated of Bradyville, Tennessee. After that company was bankrupted by a lawsuit production passed to Ison Aircraft also of Bradyville, Tennessee and next to JDT Mini-MAX of Nappanee, Indiana. The company was renamed Team Mini-Max in 2012 and moved to Niles, Michigan.In 2025, Mini-Max USA acquired the rights to all of the Mini-Max Models and took over the factory in Niles, Michigan. The company is still in business producing kits, assisting with builds, and selling plans for the Mini-Max series.

== Development ==
The Hi-MAX was developed from the mid-winged Mini-MAX family of single seat kit aircraft and it shares many similar features with the earlier design.

The Hi-MAX is predominantly constructed from wood truss with plywood gussets and covered with doped aircraft fabric. The windshield is Lexan and the side windows are removable for warm weather operations. The aircraft features a short-span wing of only 25 ft (7.6 m) and a fiberglass engine cowling. The wing and horizontal stabilizer are both strut-braced, the tail with struts above the horizontal tail surface to the fin.

The aircraft has conventional landing gear, with wheel pants as an option. The company claims that a builder can complete the aircraft in 350–400 hours from the kit.

The aircraft was originally intended to meet the requirements of the US FAR 103 Ultralight Vehicles category, including that category's maximum 254 lb (115 kg) empty weight. It was only able to achieve that low empty weight with the 28 hp (21 kW) Rotax 277, which provided marginal performance. The standard specified engine today is the 40 hp (30 kW) Rotax 447 which results in a 328 lb (149 kg) empty weight and places the aircraft in the US Experimental - Amateur-built category.

== Variants ==
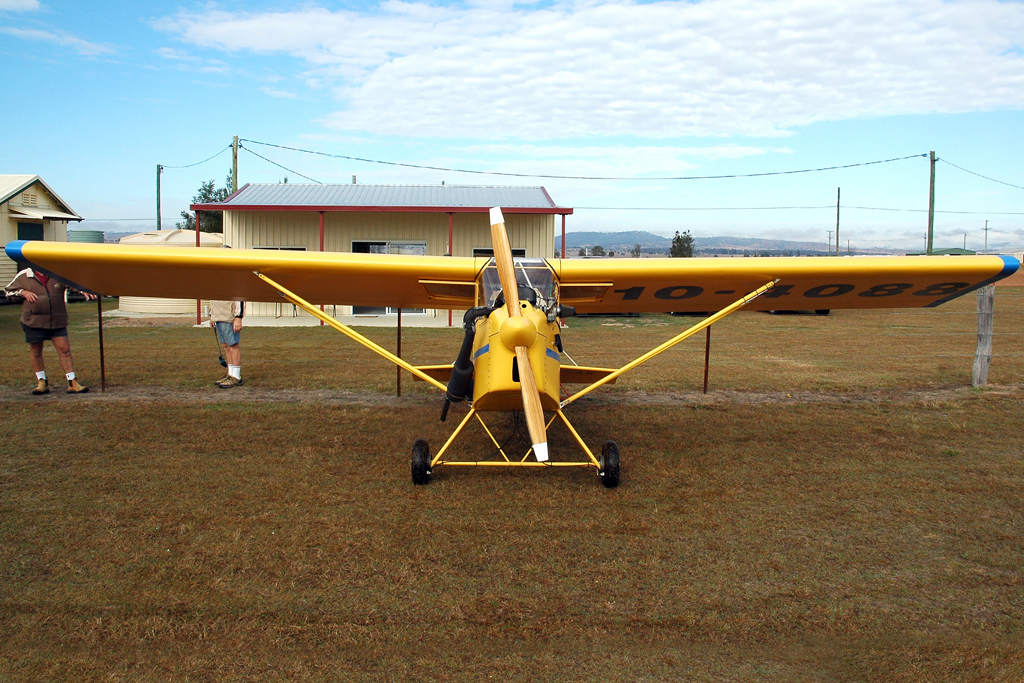
JDT Hi-MAX 1700R

1400Z
Single seat aircraft with the 45 hp (34 kW) Zenoah G-50 engine. Optional engine was the 28 hp (21 kW) Rotax 277. First flight 1991, no longer in production.
1700R
Single seat aircraft with the 40 hp (30 kW) Rotax 447 engine. First flight 1987, remains in production, with 250 completed and flown by 2011.

== Specifications (1700Z) ==
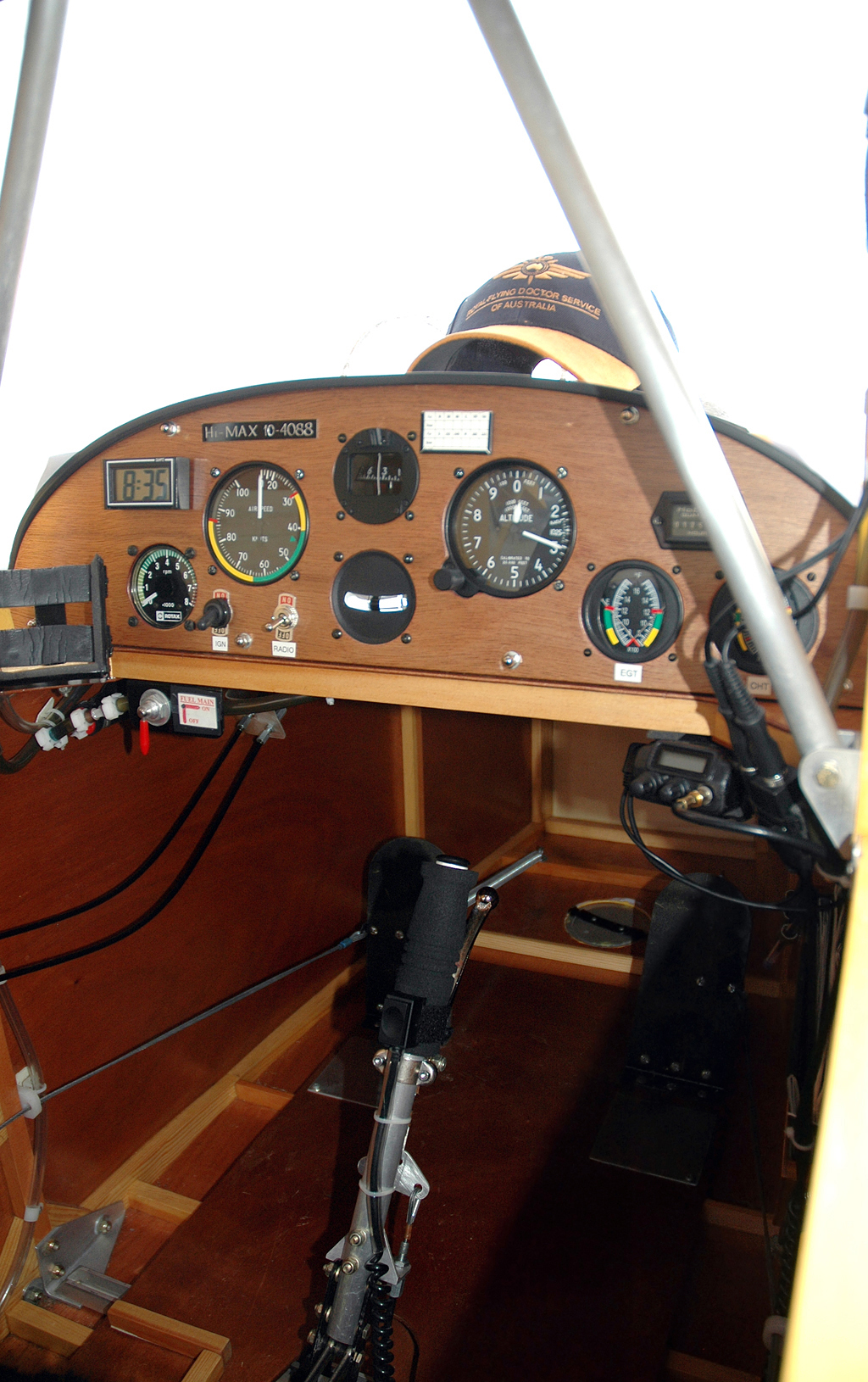
Hi-MAX instrument panel

Data from Aerocrafter, Cliche, Kitplanes & JDT website

General characteristics

- Crew: one
- Length: 16 ft 0 in (4.88 m)
- Wingspan: 25 ft 0 in (7.62 m)
- Height: 5 ft 6 in (1.68 m)
- Wing area: 112.5 sq ft (10.45 m^{2})
- Empty weight: 328 lb (149 kg)
- Gross weight: 560 lb (254 kg)
- Fuel capacity: 10 US gallons (38 litres)
- Powerplant: 1 × Rotax 447 twin cylinder, two-stroke aircraft engine, 40 hp (30 kW)

Performance

- Maximum speed: 80 mph (130 km/h, 70 kn)
- Cruise speed: 70 mph (110 km/h, 61 kn)
- Stall speed: 31 mph (50 km/h, 27 kn)
- Never exceed speed: 100 mph (160 km/h, 87 kn)
- Range: 140 mi (230 km, 120 nmi)
- Service ceiling: 10,000 ft (3,000 m)
- g limits: +4.4/-1.8
- Rate of climb: 900 ft/min (4.6 m/s)

== See also ==
Aircraft of comparable role, configuration, and era

- Preceptor N3 Pup and Super Pup
- Fisher FP-202 and FP-101
- Hipp's Superbirds J-3 Kitten
- CGS Hawk
- Birdman WT-11 Chinook
- Fisher FP-606 Sky Baby
- ISON Airbike
- Spectrum RX-28 Beaver
