= Milholland Legal Eagle =

American ultralight aircraft

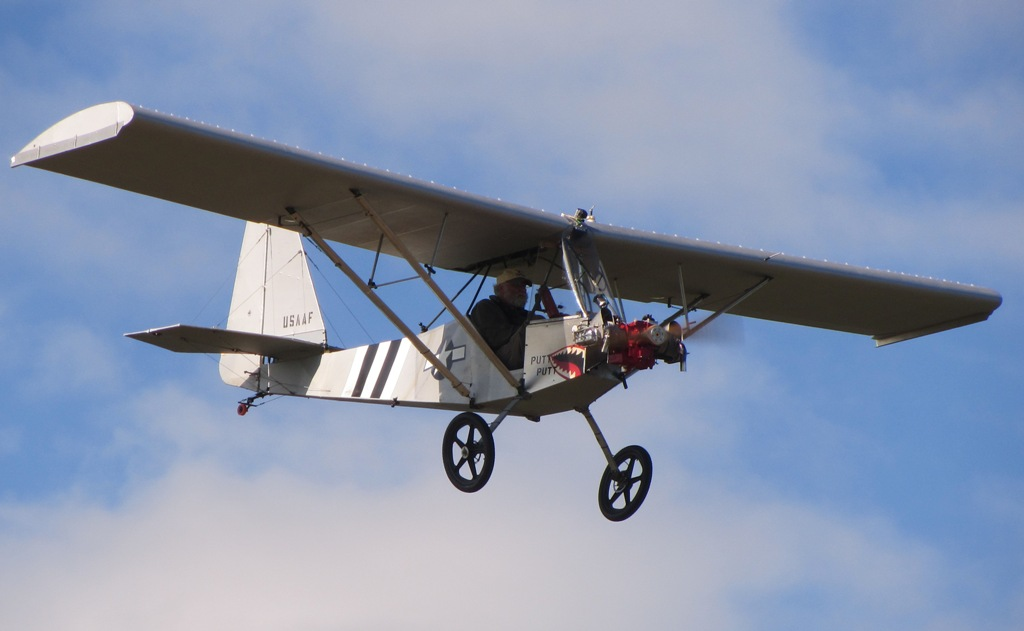

General information
- Type: Ultralight aircraft
- National origin: United States
- Manufacturer: Better Half VW
- Designer: Leonard Milholland
- Status: Plans available
- Number built: Legal Eagle - over 100 (as of 2011); Double Eagle - 6 (as of 2011)

History
- Introduction date: 1998

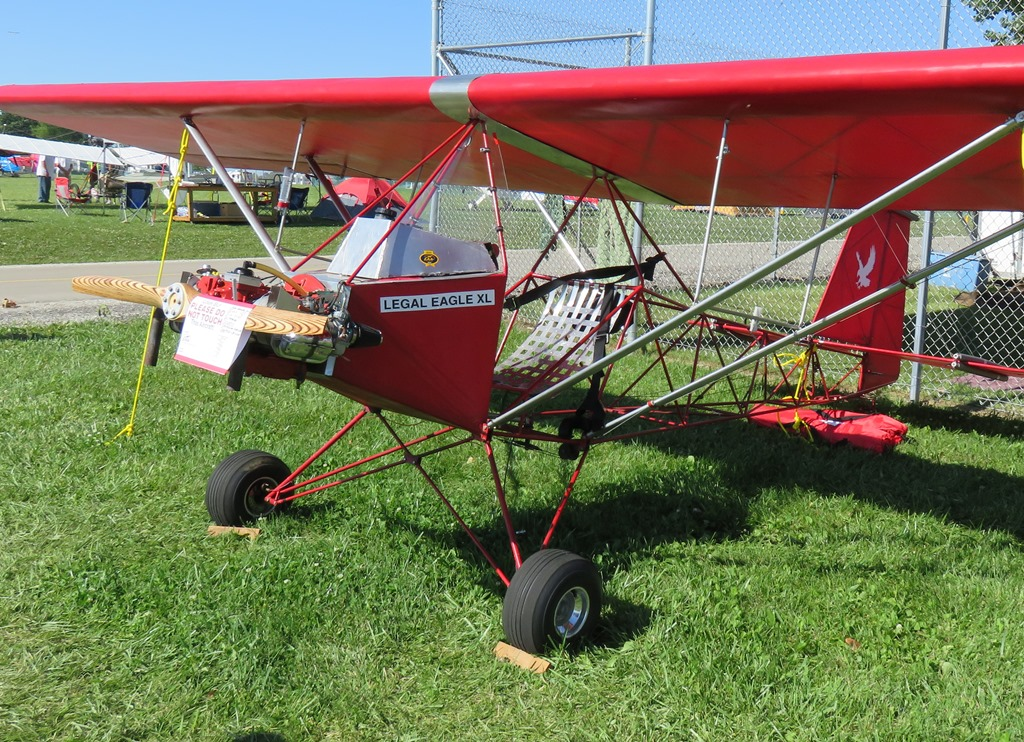
Legal Eagle XL

The Milholland Legal Eagle is an American high wing, strut-braced, single engine, tractor configuration, conventional landing gear-equipped ultralight aircraft that is available as plans from Better Half VW of Brookshire, Texas, and is intended for amateur construction.

The Legal Eagle is so named because it is capable of being built in compliance with the United States FAR 103 Ultralight Vehicles regulations, even when equipped with a four-stroke engine.

== Design and development ==
The Legal Eagle features an open cockpit and is powered by a 30 hp (22 kW) Half VW engine. As of 2023, the Legal Eagle and Legal Eagle XL can alternatively be powered by a 23 hp (17 kW) Briggs and Stratton Vanguard engine.

The design features a fuselage of welded 4130 steel tubing, mated to an all-wood wing made from spruce (and derived from the Mini-MAX). The struts and tail surfaces are made from 6061 T6 aluminium tubing. The flying surfaces are covered with doped aircraft fabric. The rear fuselage is normally left as an open truss structure to save weight and to ensure that the aircraft does not exceed the FAR 103 maximum speed of 55 knots (102 km/h; 63 mph). Like the fuselage, the taildragger landing gear is sprung steel. Additional plans were released that would allow Legal Eagle and Legal Eagle XL planes to be modified to allow wing-folding within 30 minutes.

The aircraft has been developed into several variants of the basic design including the XL version for larger pilots and a two-seat ultralight trainer and light-sport aircraft.

== Variants ==
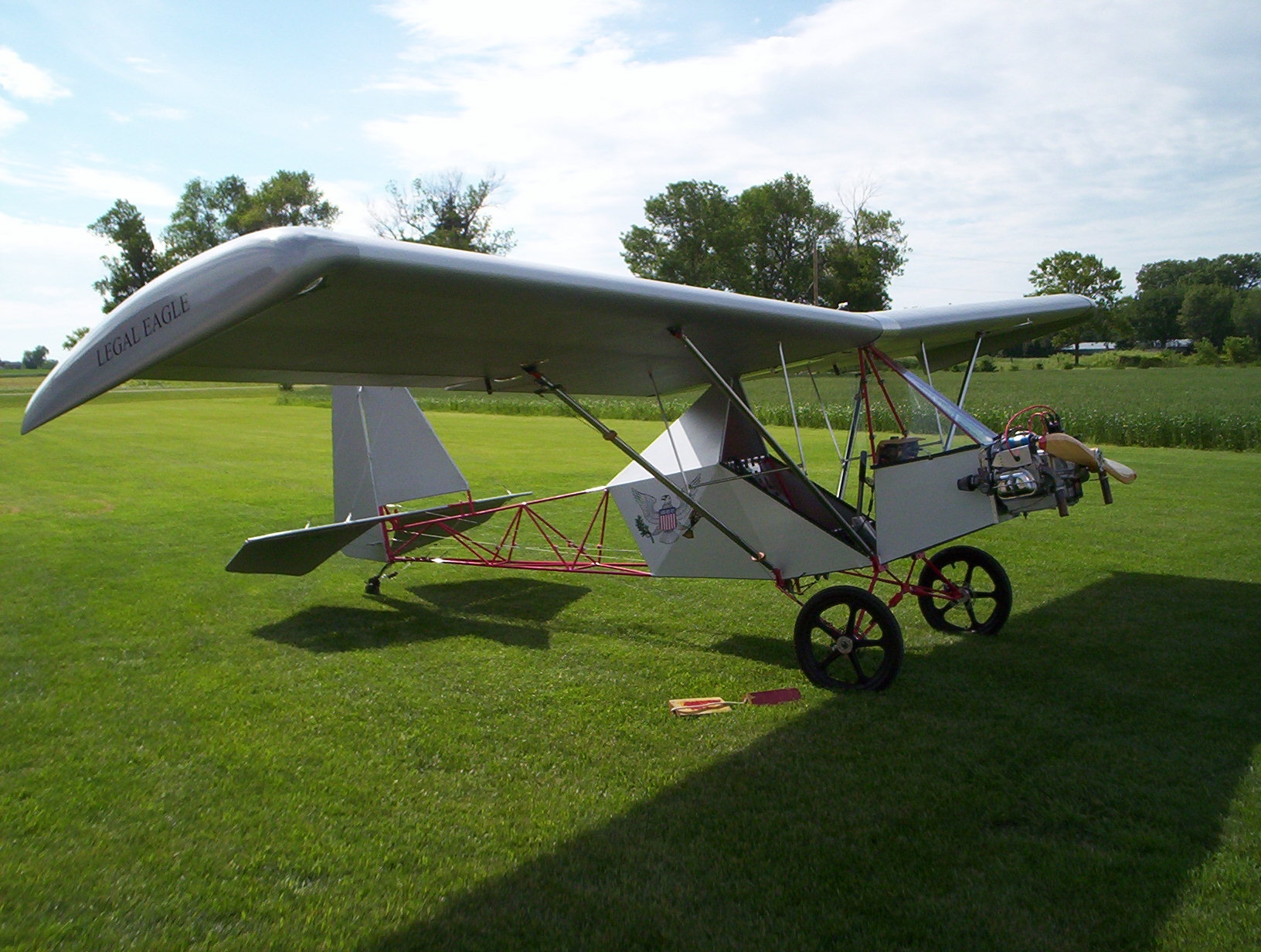
Legal Eagle

Legal Eagle
Basic model with a 244 lb (111 kg) empty weight, powered by a 30 hp (22 kW) Half VW engine or 23 hp (17 kW) Briggs and Stratton Vanguard engine.
Legal Eagle XL
Model for larger pilots with a wider and taller seat, greater wing area and longer tail. 246 lb (112 kg) empty weight
Double Eagle
Model with two seats in side-by-side configuration with a 385 lb (175 kg) empty weight and a 900 lb (408 kg) gross weight. Designed as an ultralight trainer and Light Sport Aircraft. Powered by a 60 hp (45 kW) Volkswagen air-cooled engine giving a 70 mph (113 km/h) cruise speed.

== Specifications (Legal Eagle) ==
Data from Cliche, Better Half VW and Kitplanes

General characteristics

- Crew: one
- Length: 13 ft 0 in (3.96 m)
- Wingspan: 23 ft 6 in (7.16 m)
- Height: 5 ft 6 in (1.68 m)
- Wing area: 107 sq ft (9.9 m^{2})
- Empty weight: 244 lb (111 kg)
- Gross weight: 500 lb (227 kg)
- Fuel capacity: 5 US gallons (19 litres)
- Powerplant: 1 × Half VW horizontally opposed twin-cylinder, four-stroke, single ignition aircraft engine, 30 hp (22 kW)
- Propellers: 2-bladed Culver wooden

Performance

- Maximum speed: 60 mph (97 km/h, 52 kn)
- Cruise speed: 50 mph (80 km/h, 43 kn)
- Stall speed: 25 mph (40 km/h, 22 kn)
- Never exceed speed: 80 mph (130 km/h, 70 kn)
- Range: 100 mi (160 km, 87 nmi)
- Rate of climb: 300 ft/min (1.5 m/s)
- Wing loading: 4.7 lb/sq ft (23 kg/m^{2})

== See also ==
Aircraft of comparable role, configuration, and era

- Affordaplane
- Dart Skycycle
- ISON Airbike
- Eipper Quicksilver
- Ultraflight Lazair
- Zenair Zipper
