= AeroMax =

AeroMax may refer to:

- Ford AeroMax, an American truck design
- Morgan Aeromax, a British car design
- Team Mini-Max AeroMax, an American ultralight aircraft design
