= Fisher FP-606 Sky Baby =

Canadian homebuilt light aircraft

FP-606 Sky Baby

General information
- Type: Kit aircraft
- National origin: Canada
- Manufacturer: Fisher Flying Products
- Number built: 15 (2011)

History
- Introduction date: 1986
- First flight: 1986

The Fisher FP-606 Sky Baby is a Canadian single-seat, conventional landing gear or tricycle landing gear-equipped, single-engined, high-wing monoplane kit aircraft designed for construction by amateur builders. Fisher Flying Products was originally based in Edgeley, North Dakota, United States, but the company is now located in Woodbridge, Ontario, Canada.

== Development ==
The FP-606 was designed by Fisher Aircraft in the United States in 1986 and was intended to comply with the US FAR 103 Ultralight Vehicles category, with the category's maximum 254 lb (115 kg) empty weight. The 606's standard empty weight is 250 lb (113 kg) when equipped with a two-stroke 25 hp (19 kW) Hirth F-33 engine. The design goal was to provide an ultralight version of the Cessna 150 or Cessna 152, including its looks, styling features and docile handling. To this end the 606 incorporates the 150's Omni-Vision style rear window and the swept fin found on post-1965 Cessna 150s. The wings are the same design as the Fisher FP-202 Koala with modified wingtips.

The construction of the FP-606 is of wood, with the fuselage built from wood strips arranged in a geodesic form, resulting in a very strong and light aircraft with redundant load paths. The wings, tail and fuselage are covered with doped aircraft fabric. Like the Cessna 150, the 606's wings are strut-braced, but where the 150 uses a single strut, the FP-606 incorporates a "V" strut with "N" jury struts. Also unlike the 150, which has large and powerful flaps, the 606 has no flaps. The FP-606 can be fitted with either conventional-configuration (taildragger) or tricycle-style landing gear, which is bungee suspended in either configuration. The FP-606 has a single door for pilot access, that can be removed for flight. The company claims an amateur builder would need 500 hours to build the FP-606.

The US FAR 103 Ultralight Vehicle category version of the FP-606 requires a lightweight powerplant, such as the originally specified, but now out-of-production 28 hp (21 kW) Rotax 277 or the current 25 hp (19 kW) Hirth F-33. Amateur-built category versions can be powered by the 40 hp (30 kW) Rotax 447 or 50 hp (37 kW) Rotax 503 engines.

The FP-606 won the Experimental Aircraft Association's Best New Design Award for light planes in 1988. By late 2011 more than 15 FP-606s were flying.

== Specifications (FP-606) ==
Data from Company website, AeroCrafter, Kitplanes and Cliche

General characteristics

- Crew: one
- Capacity: 250 lb (113 kg) useful load, no passengers
- Length: 17 ft 9 in (5.41 m)
- Wingspan: 28 ft 0 in (8.54 m)
- Height: 5 ft 11 in (1.80 m)
- Wing area: 116 sq ft (10.79 m^{2})
- Empty weight: 250 lb (113 kg)
- Max takeoff weight: 500 lb (226 kg)
- Powerplant: 1 × Hirth F-33 Single cylinder, two-stroke piston engine, 25 hp (19 kW)

Performance

- Maximum speed: 65 mph (105 km/h, 56 kn)
- Cruise speed: 60 mph (97 km/h, 52 kn)
- Stall speed: 26 mph (42 km/h, 23 kn)
- Never exceed speed: 90 mph (146 km/h, 78 kn)
- Rate of climb: 800 ft/min (4.1 m/s)
- Wing loading: 4.3 lb/sq ft (20.94 kg/m^{2})
- Power/mass: 20.0 lb/hp (0.084 kW/kg)

== See also ==
Related development

- Fisher FP-202 Koala

Aircraft of comparable role, configuration, and era

- Aero-Works Aerolite 103
- Beaujon Mach .07
- Beaujon Enduro
- Birdman WT-11 Chinook
- JDT Hi-MAX
- ISON Airbike
- Spectrum RX-28 Beaver
