= PA8 =

PA8 may refer to:

- Pennsylvania Route 8
- Pennsylvania's 8th congressional district
- Piper PA-8, a light aircraft of the 1940s
- Pitcairn PA-8 Super Mailwing, a biplane of the 1930s
