= Wayne Ison =

Aircraft designer

Wayne Ison (June 28, 1924 – August 9, 2014) was an aircraft designer whose designs include the Airbike, Mini-MAX, Hi-MAX and PDQ-2.

He first worked for the Ford Motor Company, then received a draft notice following the U.S. entry into the Second World War. He served as a Douglas C-47 Skytrain radio operator during World War II.

He, along with others, formed the Tennessee Engineering And Manufacturing incorporated, known as TEAM Incorporated, to market his Mini-MAX design. Following a lawsuit, TEAM was dissolved with the transfer of the Mini-MAX and Airbike designs to ISON Aircraft.

Ison was inducted into the Experimental Aircraft Association Ultralight Hall of Fame in 2000.

The Mini-MAX line, with the exception of the Airbike, is now marketed by Team Mini-Max.
