= Carlson Aircraft =

American aircraft manufacturer

- Company type: Private company
- Industry: Aerospace
- Founder: Ernst W. Carlson
- Headquarters: East Palestine, Ohio, United States
- Key people: CEO: Ernst W. Carlson
- Products: Aircraft components formerly Aircraft kits
- Owner: Team Mini-Max
- Website: carlsonaircraft-extrusions.com

Carlson Aircraft is an American aircraft design and manufacturing company based in East Palestine, Ohio.

The company was acquired by Team Mini-Max in April 2020.

== History ==
Ernst W. Carlson founded Carlson Aircraft to market his Carlson Sparrow ultralight aircraft designs as aircraft kits. He later added the Criquet, a 75% scale replica of the Fieseler Fi 156 Storch Second World War liaison aircraft and the Carlson Skycycle, a replica of the A. Hanford Eckman designed Piper PA-8 Skycycle of 1945. In the late 2000s Carlson sold the Sparrow line to Skyline Technologies' of Salem, Ohio, but that company no longer produces the Sparrow series. Today Carlson Aircraft produces wings, wing components and fuel tanks.

== Aircraft ==
Summary of aircraft built by Carlson Aircraft
Model name	First flight	Number built (as of date)	Type
Sparrow UL		100 (2001)	High wing, single seat ultralight aircraft
Sparrow II		60 (2004)	Two seat side-by-side seating, high wing, homebuilt aircraft development of the single seat Sparrow UL
Sparrow Sport Special		37 (2007)	Single seat, high wing, US homebuilt
Sparrow II XTC		34 (2007)	Two seat side-by-side seating with dual controls
Criquet	1999	1 (2010)	High-wing, two seat, Fieseler Fi 156 Storch replica
Skycycle	1995	1 (2010)	Low wing, single seat Piper PA-8 replica
