= Total Engine Concepts MM CB-40 =

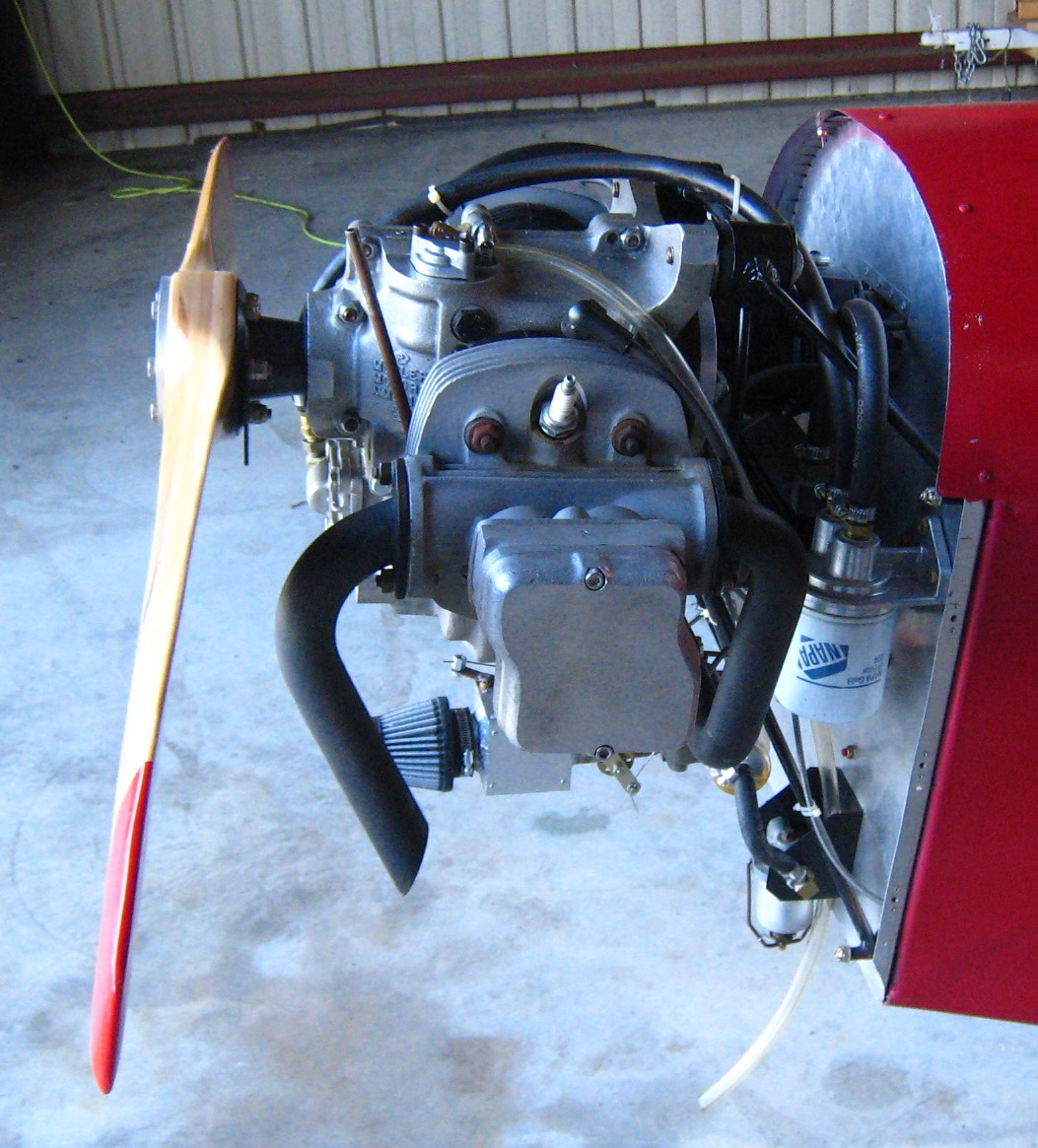
- A TEC installation on a Preceptor N3 Pup
- Type: Four-stroke, two-cylinder, Half VW aircraft engine
- National origin: United States
- Manufacturer: Total Engine Concepts
- Designer: Global Engines
- Major applications: Preceptor N3 Pup
- Developed from: Mosler MM CB 40

Total Engine Concepts MM CB-40 is a four-stroke, two-cylinder, Half VW aircraft engine.

== Design and development ==
The engine was progressively developed designed around Volkswagen air-cooled engine components. Global Motors originally designed a Half VW engine for use in light aircraft. The company and its designs were then sold to Mosler Motors. Warren Mosler specialized in racing engines and added the engine to the list of products eventually marketed under the company name Total Engine Concepts. The engine was dropped from production in 1998.

The CB-40 was re-engineered to overcome problems of vibration and cooling in the original design.

Suited for ultralight use and single seat light sport aircraft, the engine weighs 86 lbs (39 kg) and produces 40 hp (30 kW). The engine uses a short aluminum crankcase with redesigned oil galleries for improved lubrication. The engine is counterweight balanced with a drop-forged crankshaft.

== Variants ==
CB-40
Base model 40 hp (30 kW) 94mm bore 78mm stroke.
CB-35
35 hp (26 kW) 92mm bore 78mm stroke.

== Applications ==
- Preceptor N3 Pup
- Sorrell Hiperlight
- Mini-MAX
- Pik-26

== Specifications MM CB-40 ==
=== General characteristics ===
- Type: 2-cylinder air-cooled horizontally opposed aircraft piston engine
- Bore: 3.701 in
- Stroke: 3.071 in
- Displacement: 66.1 in³
- Dry weight: 86 lbs

=== Components ===
- Fuel type: 100LL avgas
- Cooling system: Air-cooled

=== Performance ===
- Power output: 40 hp at 3250 rpm at sea level
- Compression ratio: 8.94:1

== See also ==
- List of aircraft engines
- Volkswagen air-cooled engine#Half_VW
- Better Half VW
