= Preceptor Aircraft =

American aircraft kit manufacturer specializing in homebuilt monoplanes

- Type: Private
- Industry: Aerospace
- Fate: Out of business (2016)
- Headquarters: Lake Lure, North Carolina
- Key people: Bob Counts
- Products: Homebuilt aircraft
- Website: www.preceptorair.com

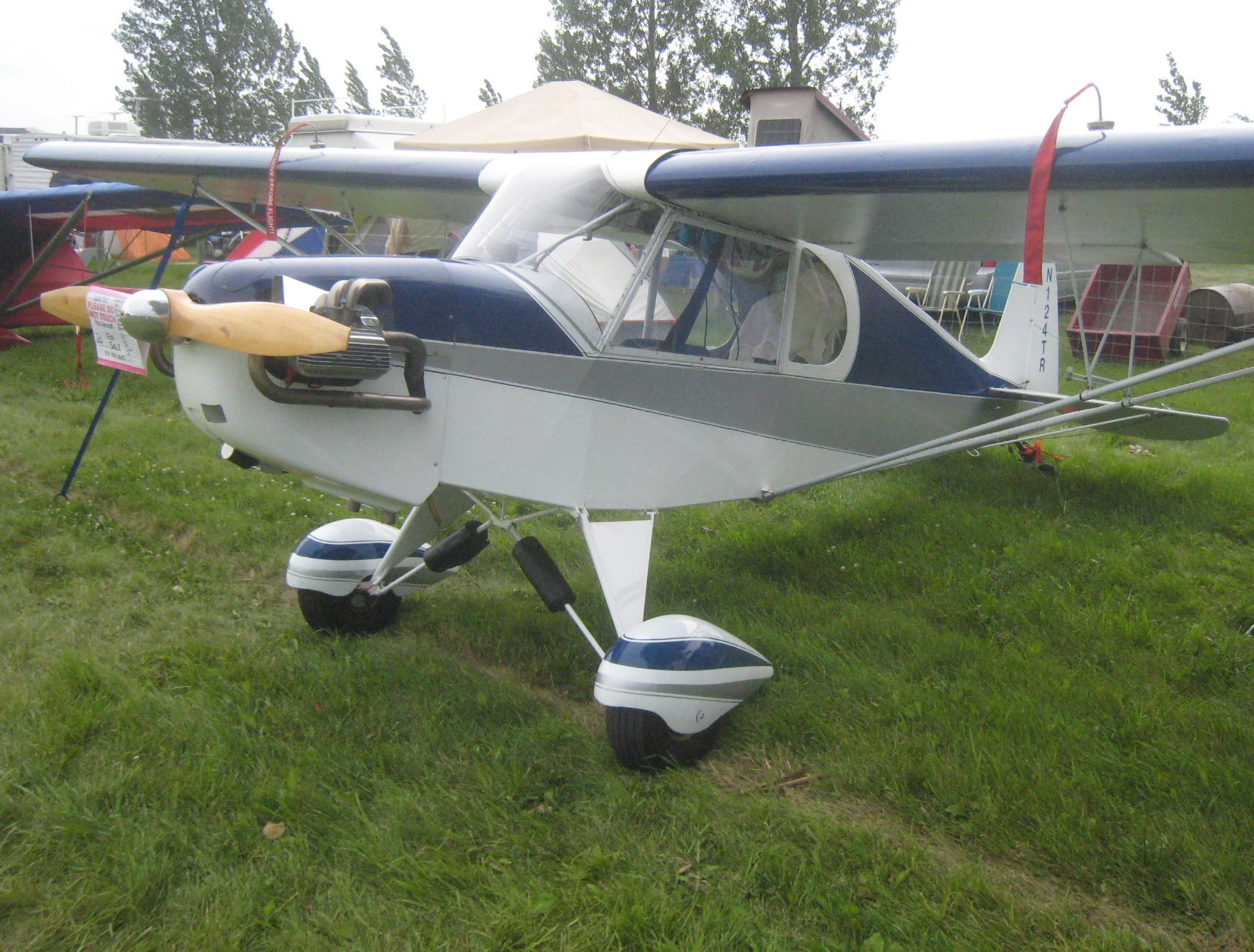
Ultra Pup

Preceptor Aircraft was an American aircraft kit manufacturer located in Lake Lure, North Carolina and later in Rutherfordton, North Carolina, producing kits for homebuilt monoplanes. The company was previously named Nostalgair.

After a period of inactivity, the company relaunched its website to deliver plans in 2013, although by 2017 the website was not operating and the company seems to have gone out of business in 2016.

== History ==
Preceptor Aircraft was originally called Nostalgair and based in San Antonio, Texas. N3 Pup construction was subcontracted to a Colorado company. Nostalgair and its sister company, Global Tool, (maker of Global engines), went out of business in 1986. Warren Mosler purchased the company's assets and appointed Bob Counts, designer of the N3 Pup, as president. Production moved to Winston-Salem, North Carolina. By 1993, the company expanded to two buildings and produced as many as 40 kits per year.

== Aircraft ==
- STOL King, a high wing STOL aircraft.
- Ultra Pup, a two seat high wing aircraft.
- Super Pup, a single seat experimental high wing aircraft.
- N3 Pup, a single seat ultralight high wing aircraft.
- Stinger, a single seat ultralight high wing aircraft.
