= Better Half VW =

American aircraft engine

- Type: Aircraft engine
- National origin: United States
- Manufacturer: Better Half
- Designer: Leonard Milholland
- First run: 1993
- Major applications: Milholland Legal Eagle
- Developed from: Volkswagen air-cooled engine

The Better Half VW is an American aircraft engine, designed by Leonard Milholland of Brookshire, Texas, in 1993 for use in ultralight aircraft. The engine is supplied in the form of plans for amateur construction.

== Design and development ==
The engine is a twin cylinder four-stroke, horizontally-opposed air-cooled, direct-drive gasoline engine design based on the Volkswagen air-cooled engine. It employs coil ignition and produces about 30 hp (22 kW). Unlike other half VWs this design does not require cutting the engine block in half, but instead blanks the two aft cylinders and removes the pistons.

The design has evolved over time, incorporating improvements to reduce complexity and improve reliability.

== Applications ==
- Milholland Legal Eagle

== Specifications (Better Half VW) ==
Data from World Directory of Leisure Aviation 2011-12

=== General characteristics ===
- Type: Twin cylinder, four-stroke aircraft engine
- Bore: 92 mm (3.6 in)
- Stroke: 85 mm (3.3 in)
- Displacement: 920 cc (56.1 cu in)
- Dry weight: 40 kg (88.2 lb)

=== Components ===
- Fuel type: gasoline
- Cooling system: air

=== Performance ===
- Power output: 30 hp (22 kW)
- Compression ratio: 8.5:1

== See also ==
- Volkswagen air-cooled engine#Half_VW
- Total Engine Concepts MM CB-40

Related lists

- List of aircraft engines
