= PDQ Aircraft Products PDQ-2 =

PDQ-2
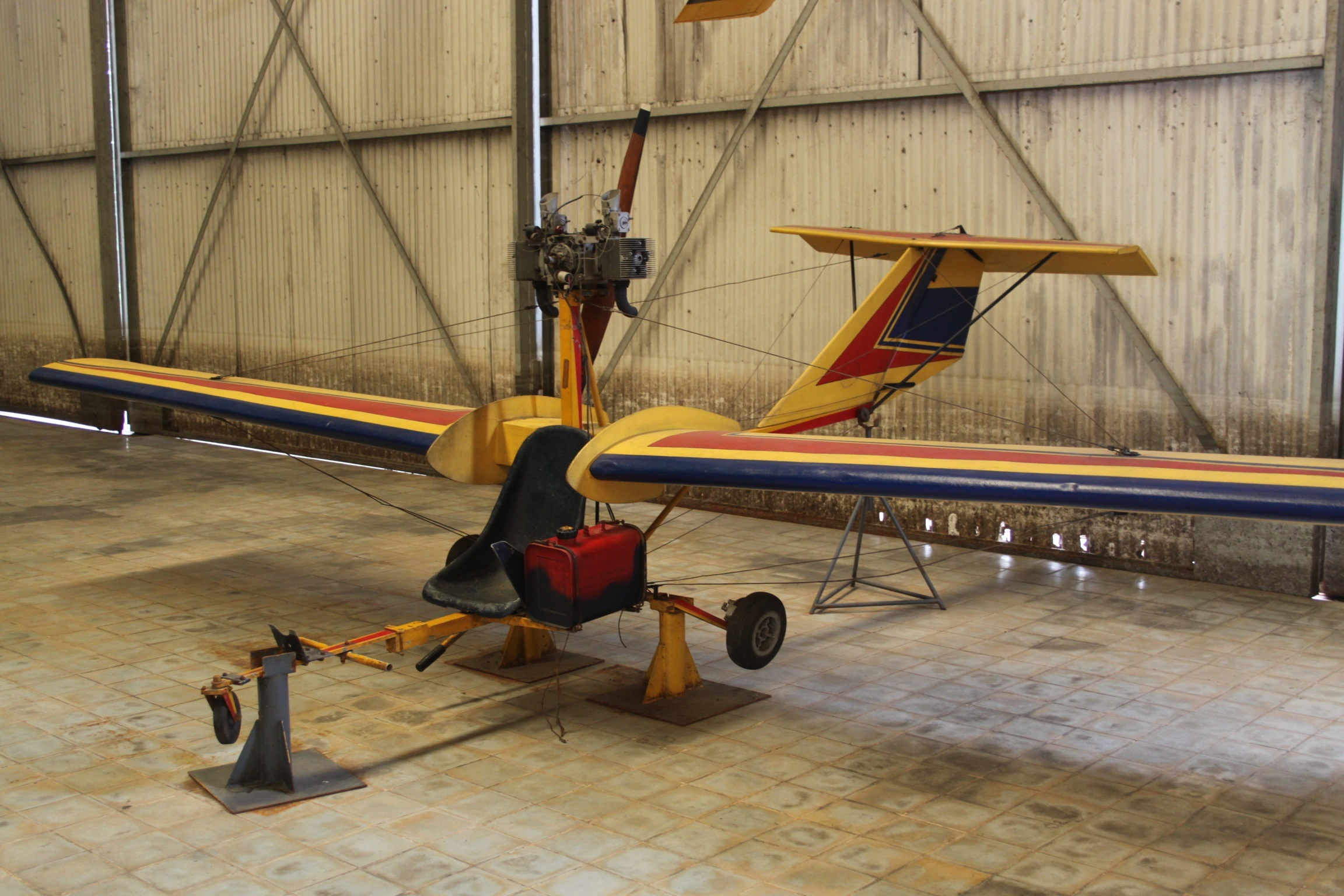

General information
- Type: Sport aircraft
- National origin: United States
- Manufacturer: Homebuilt aircraft
- Designer: Wayne Ison

History
- First flight: 30 May 1973

The PDQ Aircraft Products PDQ-2 is a very basic light aircraft originally built in 1973 in the United States, and marketed as plans for a homebuilt aircraft. It was a minimalist design, consisting of aluminum alloy tubes carrying the pilot's seat, a set of monoplane wings and a T-tail. The pilot's position was fully exposed at the front of the aircraft. Power is provided by a single engine mounted pusher-fashion on a pylon above the wings. Originally, this was a Rockwell JLO snowmobile engine, but Ison revised the design to use a converted Volkswagen engine, due to a lack of availability of the first choice of engine. The heavier Volkswagen engine required an increase in structural strength, and the design was revised accordingly. The wings have wooden spars with ribs, and skin of polyurethane foam, all coated in epoxy resin. Fixed, tricycle undercarriage was fitted.

The PDQ-2 uses a NACA 63A615 airfoil.

Plans for the design were still marketed in 2005.

== Specifications ==
Data from Jane's All the World's Aircraft 1977–78, p.554

General characteristics

- Crew: One pilot
- Length: 14 ft 6 in (4.42 m)
- Wingspan: 22 ft 0 in (6.71 m)
- Height: 4 ft 2 in (1.27 m)
- Empty weight: 360 lb (160 kg)
- Gross weight: 600 lb (270 kg)
- Powerplant: 1 × Rockwell JLO-LB-600-2 , 36 hp (27 kW)

Performance

- Maximum speed: 80 mph (130 km/h, 70 kn)
- Service ceiling: 10,000 ft (3,050 m)
- Rate of climb: 500 ft/min (2.5 m/s)
