= Preceptor N3 Pup =

American kit aircraft

N3 Pup
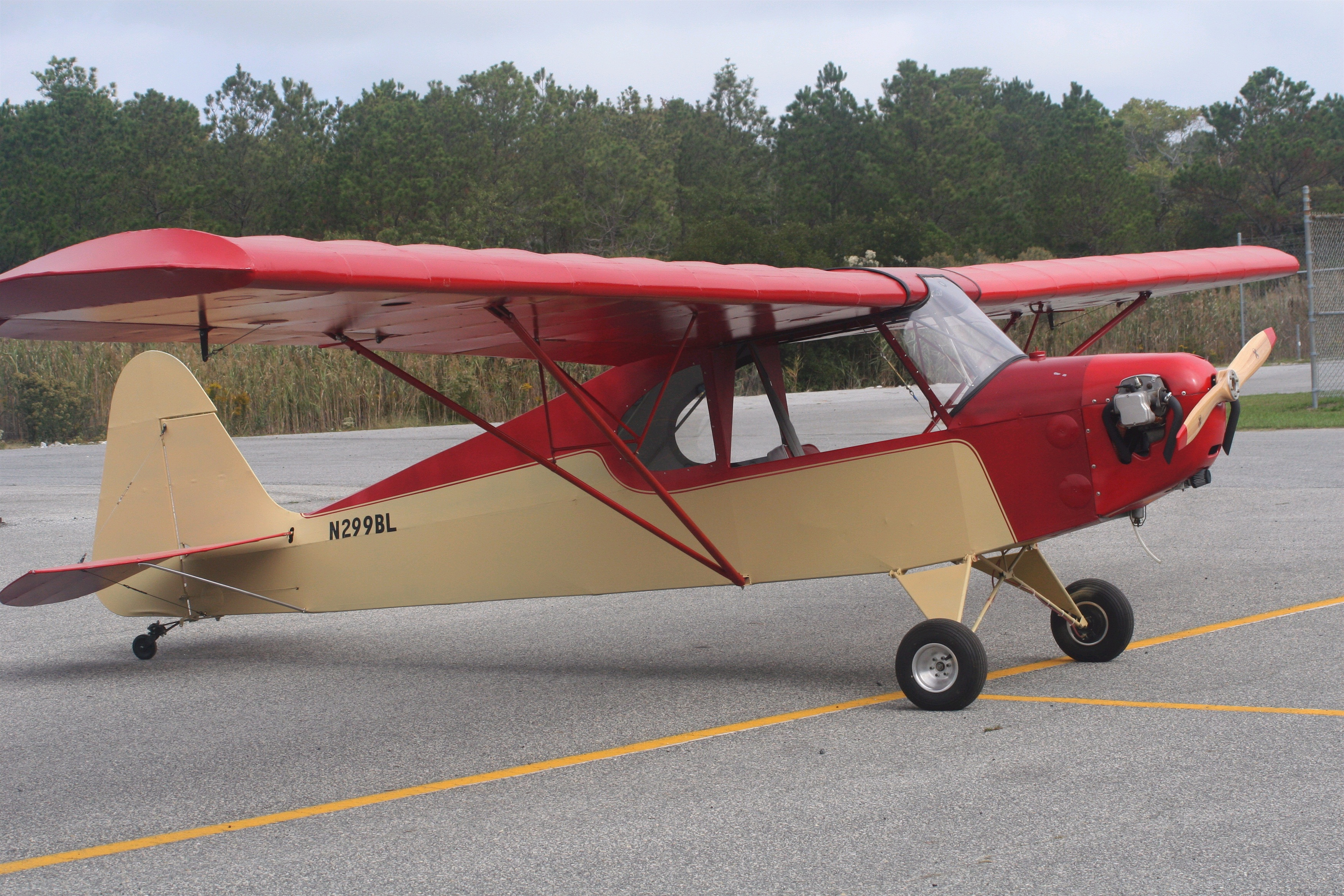
- Preceptor N-3 Puppy

General information
- Type: Kit aircraft
- Manufacturer: Preceptor Aircraft
- Designer: Bob Counts
- Status: Production completed
- Number built: 1087 (total family of aircraft, 2011)

History
- Variants: Preceptor Stinger; Little Wing Roto-Pup

The Preceptor N3 Pup is a family of ultralight, tube-and-fabric, high-wing, homebuilt aircraft. Kits were produced and marketed by Preceptor Aircraft, of Rutherfordton, North Carolina. The company was operating on a limited basis, actively selling plans online, but seems to have gone out of business in 2016.

Designed to meet FAR 103 Ultralight Vehicles standards, the N3 Pup can accept various lightweight four stroke engines of between 37 and 60 hp (28 and 45 kW). If built to specifications with minimal additions, it can meet the requirements for a FAR 103 ultralight aircraft, with an empty weight of 254 lb (115 kg). It may also be built as an amateur-built aircraft or US light-sport aircraft at higher weights.

== Design and development ==
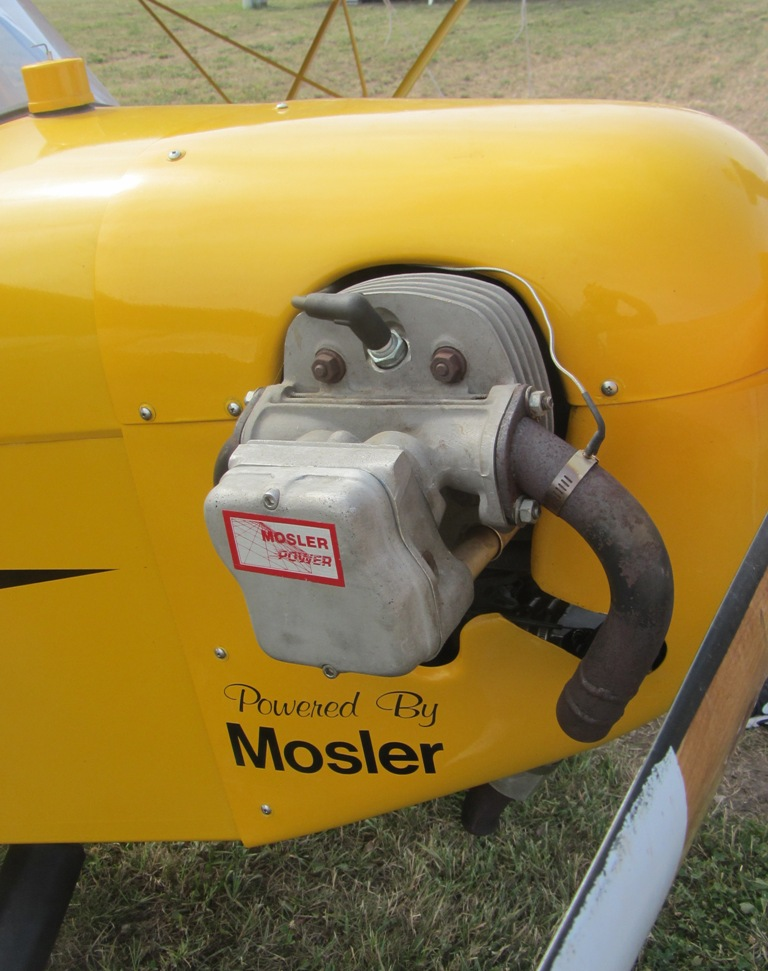
N3 with a Mosler Half VW engine

The Pup is designed to be flown cross-country and also can be mounted with floats and skis.

The N3 Pup uses tube-and-fabric construction and a conventional 4-cycle engine. The fuselage and tail are welded from 4130 steel tube. There are two main wing configurations that can be built. An aluminum wing spar with hinges allows the wings to be folded for trailering or storage. A wooden wing spar configuration gives the plane a lighter weight, but leaves the wings fixed. The engine cowling is made from fiberglass.

The aircraft has had many engine choices available, but was marketed to use the Half VW engine first developed by Global engines, later bought by Mosler engines and finally marketed by TEC engines. The Total Engine Concepts MM CB-40 was the last purpose-built engine marketed for the Pup. The aircraft was sold as a partially prefabricated kit or can be built scratchbuilt from plans.

The design was also adapted as an autogyro, the Little Wing Roto-Pup.

== Operational history ==
A N3 Pup named "Citabriette" -- modified to look like a Citabria -- won the Grand Champion Ultralight award at the EAA Oshkosh airshow 1988.

== Variants ==
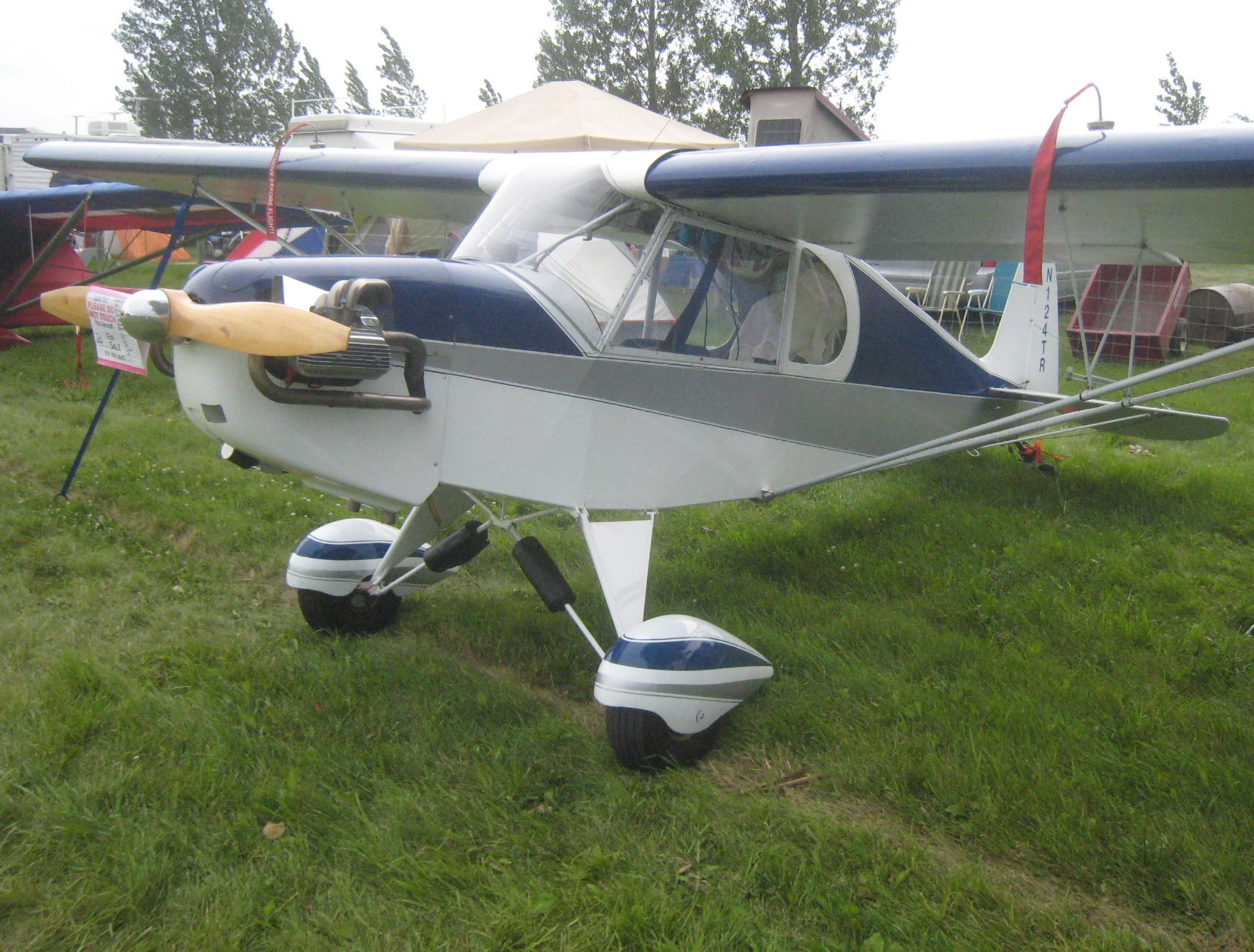
Ultra Pup

N3 Pup
Single seat variant designed to resemble a 3/4 scale Piper J-3 Cub. Originally named the Nostalgair N-3 Pup. Engine is a TEC Half VW of 40 hp (30 kW). Meets FAR 103 requirements with an empty weight of 254 lb (115 kg) and gross weight of 535 lb (243 kg). 830 had been completed by December 2011.
Stinger
Single seat variant with a parasol wing in place of the enclosed cabin, longer nose and larger engine. First flown in 1995. Engine is a Volkswagen air-cooled engine of 50 hp (37 kW). Gross weight of 550 lb (249 kg). Two had been completed by December 2011.
Super Pup
Single seat variant with larger engine and higher empty weight, first flown in 1995. Engine is a Volkswagen air-cooled engine of 50 hp (37 kW). Empty weight of 330 lb (150 kg) and gross weight of 630 lb (286 kg). 55 had been completed and flown by December 2011.
Ultra Pup (N3-2)
Two seat 3/4 scale Piper J-3 Cub, first flown in 1988 with a 35 hp (26 kW) MM-CB engine. Production engine is a Volkswagen air-cooled engine of 60 hp (45 kW). Empty weight of 450 lb (204 kg) and gross weight of 1,100 lb (499 kg). Folding wings for storage or ground transport. 200 had been completed and flown by December 2011.

== Specifications (N3 Pup) ==
Data from Manufacturer's website & Kitplanes

General characteristics

- Crew: one
- Length: 16 ft 6 in (5.03 m)
- Wingspan: 30 ft 6 in (9.30 m)
- Height: 5 ft 0 in (1.52 m)
- Wing area: 120 sq ft (11 m^{2})
- Empty weight: 254 lb (115 kg)
- Gross weight: 535 lb (243 kg)
- Fuel capacity: 5 US Gallons (19 litres)
- Powerplant: 1 × Hummel Half VW 1037 cc four-stroke, two-cylinder horizontally opposed aircraft engine, 37 hp (28 kW)
- Propellers: 2-bladed wooden, 4 ft 6 in (1.37 m) diameter

Performance

- Maximum speed: 63 mph (101 km/h, 55 kn)
- Cruise speed: 60 mph (97 km/h, 52 kn)
- Stall speed: 27 mph (43 km/h, 23 kn)
- Range: 170 mi (280 km, 150 nmi)
- Service ceiling: 10,000 ft (3,000 m)
- g limits: +10.0/-3.0 ultimate
- Rate of climb: 600 ft/min (3.0 m/s)
- Wing loading: 3.76 lb/sq ft (18.4 kg/m^{2})

Avionics

- none

== See also ==
Aircraft of comparable role, configuration, and era

- Piper J-3 (not in same class (a certified airplane), but the aircraft that the ultralight-class Preceptor N3 Pup imitates in miniature, at about 3/4 scale. N3 Pup is much slower, and about half the power, volume and payload of the J-3 Cub, and a fraction of the Cub's weight.)
- Hipp's Superbirds J-3 Kitten (Preceptor Pup is designed by a former Hipps worker)
- Belite Ultra Cub
- Ultravia Pelican
- Rocky Mountain Wings Ridge Runner
- Anglin J6 Karatoo
- Norman Aviation J6 Karatoo
- Wood Sky Pup
- Team Mini-Max Hi-MAX
- Fisher FP-202 Koala
- Light Miniature Aircraft LM-1
