= NWT Spruce Coupe =

American homebuilt aircraft

Spruce Coupe

General information
- Type: Homebuilt aircraft
- National origin: United States
- Manufacturer: NWT Co
- Status: Production completed (2014)
- Number built: at least two

The NWT Spruce Coupe is an American homebuilt aircraft that was designed and produced by NWT Co of Charleston, Maine. When it was available the aircraft was supplied as a kit and also in the form of plans for amateur construction.

== Design and development ==
The Spruce Coupe features a strut-braced low-wing, a single-seat enclosed cockpit, fixed conventional landing gear and a single engine in tractor configuration.

The aircraft is made from a combination of spruce or pine, and fir, birch, mahogany plywood with its flying surfaces covered in doped aircraft fabric. Its 22.00 ft (6.7 m) span wing has a wing area of 88.00 sq ft (8.175 m^{2}), mounts Junkers ailerons and is braced with "V" struts to the landing gear. The cabin width is 23 in (58 cm). The acceptable power range is 40 to 50 hp (30 to 37 kW) and the standard engine used is the 45 hp (34 kW) Zenoah G-50 twin-cylinder, horizontally opposed, two stroke, carburetted aircraft engine.

The Spruce Coupe has a typical empty weight of 300 lb (140 kg) and a gross weight of 600 lb (270 kg), giving a useful load of 300 lb (140 kg). With full fuel of 6 U.S. gallons (23 L; 5.0 imp gal) the payload for the pilot, passengers and baggage is 270 lb (120 kg).

The aircraft is noted for its STOL capabilities and the standard day, sea level, no wind, take off with a 45 hp (34 kW) engine is 75 ft (23 m) and the landing roll is 100 ft (30 m).

The manufacturer estimates the construction time from the supplied kit as 500 hours.

== Operational history ==
By 1998 the company reported that one aircraft had been completed and was flying.

== Specifications (Spruce Coupe) ==
Data from AeroCrafter

General characteristics

- Crew: one
- Length: 16 ft 4 in (4.98 m)
- Wingspan: 22 ft 0 in (6.71 m)
- Wing area: 88.00 sq ft (8.175 m^{2})
- Empty weight: 300 lb (136 kg)
- Gross weight: 600 lb (272 kg)
- Fuel capacity: 6 U.S. gallons (23 L; 5.0 imp gal)
- Powerplant: 1 × Zenoah G-50 twin-cylinder, horizontally opposed, two stroke, carburetted aircraft engine, 45 hp (34 kW)
- Propellers: 2-bladed wooden fixed pitch

Performance

- Maximum speed: 75 mph (121 km/h, 65 kn)
- Cruise speed: 60 mph (97 km/h, 52 kn)
- Stall speed: 35 mph (56 km/h, 30 kn)
- Range: 80 mi (130 km, 70 nmi)
- Rate of climb: 1,200 ft/min (6.1 m/s)
- Wing loading: 6.8 lb/sq ft (33 kg/m^{2})
