= Affordaplane =

American ultralight aircraft

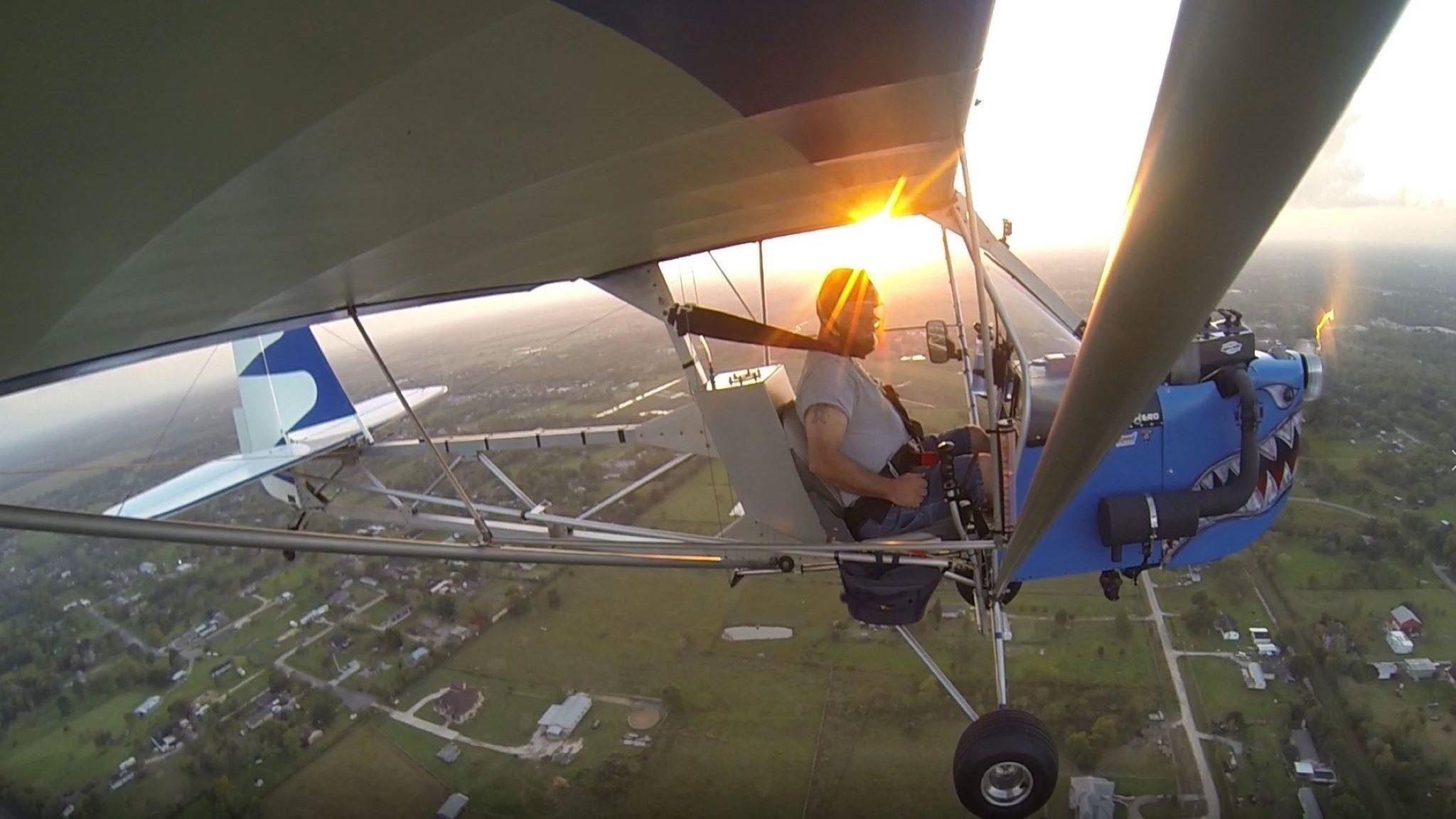
- Affordaplane TA-1 sunset flight Pearland Texas

General information
- Type: Ultralight aircraft
- National origin: United States
- Status: Plans available

History
- First flight: 2001

The Affordaplane (sometimes written Afford-A-Plane) is an American plans-built ultralight aircraft for the US FAR 103 Ultralight Vehicles rules. The aircraft plans claim it can be built out of readily sourced and inexpensive materials using common tools in 150 to 250 hours construction time.

== Design and development ==
The Affordaplane is constructed of a 6061 T-6 aluminum tube fuselage and other structural components, using both square and round aluminum tube. Wings are a "ladder-type" cross-brace structure supported by struts and covered in doped fabric. Builders have the option of constructing the ribs out of aluminum tube or rigid foam. Instead of welding, structural components are attached with riveted or bolted aluminum gussets. The cockpit is exposed, with a Plexiglas or Lexan windshield. The controls are conventional 3-axis.

When built as a Part 103 ultralight, the aircraft is intended to be powered by a 26 hp (19 kW) Rotax 277, 35 hp (26 kW) Rotax 377, or similar engine. Heavier and more powerful engines, including the Rotax 503, may also be used, but will result in exceeding the FAR Part 103 254-pound (115-kg) empty weight limit, if the aircraft is otherwise built as designed. The plans recommend Rotax engines, but the Half VW, Kawasaki 340 and Kawasaki 440 have also been used.

The Affordaplane has a unique single acting aileron control surface approximately the entire length of the wing. Some builders have configured these as flaperons, but the plans do not include details for this modification.

== Variants ==
The plans are drawn as a single-seat version. At least one builder has constructed a two-seat, tandem version.

== Specifications (ultralight configuration) ==
Data from Ultralight News, Pilot Mix.

General characteristics

- Crew: one
- Capacity: one (ultralight configuration)
- Length: 17 ft 3 in (5.26 m)
- Wingspan: 27 ft 5 in (8.36 m)
- Height: 5 ft 0 in (1.52 m) varies by main landing gear wheel diameter
- Wing area: 123 sq ft (11.4 m^{2})
- Empty weight: 254 lb (115 kg)
- Gross weight: 540 lb (245 kg)
- Fuel capacity: 5 US gallons (19 litres)
- Powerplant: 1 × Rotax 277 2-stroke gasoline, 26 hp (19 kW)
- Propellers: 2, 3, or 4-bladed composite (preferred) or wood (prop varies by builder configuration)

Performance

- Maximum speed: 63 mph (101 km/h, 55 kn)
- Cruise speed: 55 mph (89 km/h, 48 kn)
- Stall speed: 26 mph (42 km/h, 23 kn)
- Never exceed speed: 75 mph (121 km/h, 65 kn)
- Range: 150 mi (240 km, 130 nmi) estimated
- Service ceiling: 10,000 ft (3,000 m) estimated
- Rate of climb: 1,000 ft/min (5.1 m/s) estimated
- Wing loading: 4.39 lb/sq ft (21.4 kg/m^{2}) Part 103 compliant at MTOW

== See also ==
Aircraft of comparable role, configuration, and era

- ISON Airbike
- Legal Eagle
- Dart Skycycle
- Fisher FP-505 Skeeter
