= Team Mini-Max AeroMax =

American homebuilt aircraft

AeroMax

General information
- Type: Amateur-built aircraft and Light-sport aircraft
- National origin: United States
- Manufacturer: Team Mini-Max
- Status: In production (2012)

History
- Manufactured: 2012-present
- Introduction date: 2012
- Developed from: ISON Airbike

The Team Mini-Max AeroMax is an American amateur-built aircraft and light-sport aircraft, produced by Team Mini-Max of Niles, Michigan. The aircraft is supplied as a kit for amateur construction.

== Design and development ==
Developed from the ISON Airbike, the AeroMax features a strut-braced high-wing, a single-seat open cockpit that is 14 in (36 cm) wide, fixed conventional landing gear and a single engine in tractor configuration. The narrow fuselage allows the pilot to sit in the cockpit with his or her legs on the outside of the aircraft, with feet on the external rudder pedals.

The aircraft is made from pre-fabricated metal components and CNC laser-cut plywood parts. Its 28.4 ft (8.7 m) span wing has an area of 127.7 sq ft (11.86 m^{2}), is supported by "V" struts and features fiberglass drooped wingtips. The main landing gear is made from sprung steel and mounts drum brakes. The elevator trim system is electric. The aircraft's recommended engine the 50 hp (37 kW) Hirth F-23 two-stroke powerplant. Tricycle landing gear, tundra tires and floats are under development. Construction time from the supplied kit is estimated as 200–300 hours.

A tandem two seat model is also under development by the company.

As of August 2012, the design does not appear on the Federal Aviation Administration's list of approved special light-sport aircraft.

== Specifications (AeroMax) ==
Data from Kitplanes and manufacturer

General characteristics

- Crew: one
- Capacity: one passenger
- Length: 17 ft 10 in (5.44 m)
- Wingspan: 28 ft 5 in (8.66 m)
- Height: 5 ft 11 in (1.80 m)
- Wing area: 127.7 sq ft (11.86 m^{2})
- Empty weight: 429 lb (195 kg)
- Gross weight: 738 lb (335 kg)
- Fuel capacity: 13 U.S. gallons (49 L; 11 imp gal)
- Powerplant: 1 × Hirth F-23 twin cylinder, air-cooled, two stroke aircraft engine, 50 hp (37 kW)
- Propellers: 3-bladed composite

Performance

- Maximum speed: 75 mph (121 km/h, 65 kn)
- Cruise speed: 69 mph (111 km/h, 60 kn)
- Stall speed: 32 mph (51 km/h, 28 kn)
- Never exceed speed: 110 mph (180 km/h, 96 kn)
- g limits: +3.5/-1.8
- Rate of climb: 1,500 ft/min (7.6 m/s)
- Wing loading: 5.8 lb/sq ft (28 kg/m^{2})
