= Zenoah G-50 =

- Type: Twin cylinder two-stroke aircraft engine
- National origin: Japan
- Manufacturer: Zenoah

The Zenoah G-50 is a twin-cylinder, horizontally opposed, two stroke, carburetted aircraft engine, designed for use on ultralight aircraft.

== Development ==
The Zenoah G-50 is equipped with single capacitor discharge ignition and dual Mikuni slide-type carburetors. It is equipped with a recoil starter system or optionally electric start and a 2.1 or 2.6:1 belt reduction drive.

The engine runs on a mixture of unleaded auto fuel and oil.

Producing 45 hp (34 kW) at 5800 rpm, the G-50 competed in the early 1980s ultralight powerplant market against the similar Rotax 447. Production of the engine was completed in the late 1980s and today only used engines and parts are available.

== Variants ==
G50C
Twin-cylinder, horizontally opposed, two stroke, dual-carburetor, fan cooled aircraft engine.
G50D
Twin-cylinder, horizontally opposed, two stroke, dual-carburetor, free air cooled aircraft engine.
G50DFW
Twin-cylinder, horizontally opposed, two stroke, dual-carburetor, free air cooled aircraft engine, configured for firewall mounting, recoil starting not available.

== Applications ==
- AmeriPlanes Mitchell Wing T-10
- Eagles Wing Scout
- Goodwin Buckshot
- TEAM 1200Z Z-MAX
- TEAM 1300Z Z-MAX
- NWT Spruce Coupe
- Tennessee Propellers Scout

== Specifications (G-50C) ==
Data from Cliche & Tennessee Propellers

=== General characteristics ===
- Type: Two cylinder, two-stroke aircraft engine
- Bore: 72 mm (2.8 in)
- Stroke: 59.5 mm (2.3 in)
- Displacement: 484 cc (29.54 cu in)
- Length: 14.96 in (380.0 mm)
- Width: 23.39 in (594.1 mm)
- Height: 15.00 in (381.0 mm)
- Dry weight: 90 lb (40.8 kg) equipped with reduction drive, electric start and muffler

=== Components ===
- Valvetrain: piston ported
- Fuel type: unleaded auto fuel
- Oil system: pre-mixed
- Cooling system: free air
- Reduction gear: 2.1 or 2.6:1 belt system

=== Performance ===
- Power output: 45 hp (34 kW) at 5800 rpm
- Compression ratio: 6.5:1
