= Mini-MAX =

American kit aircraft

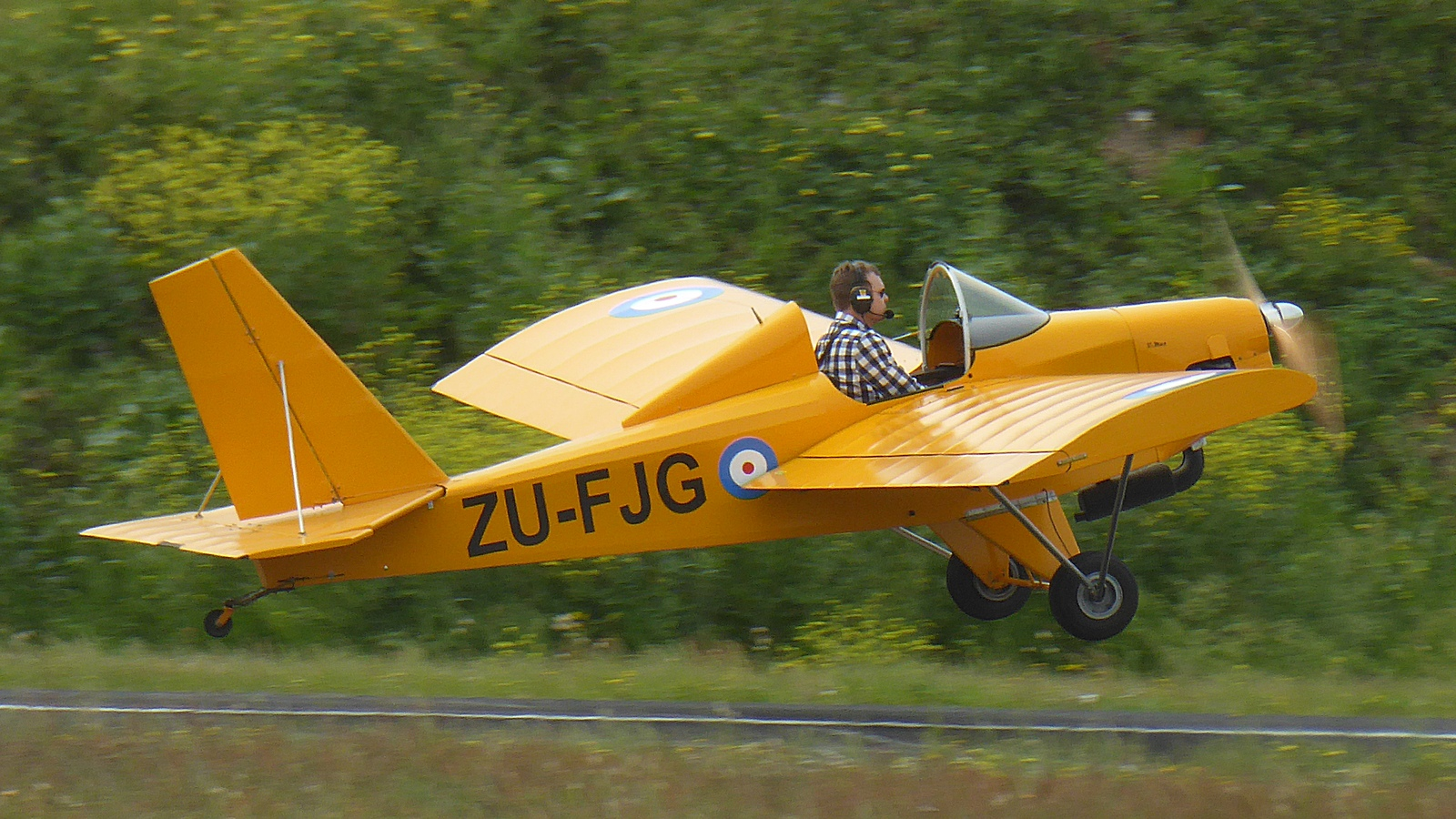
- 1550V V-MAX

General information
- Type: Kit aircraft
- National origin: United States
- Manufacturer: Team Mini-Max
- Designer: Wayne Ison
- Status: Kits In production
- Number built: More than 1802

History
- Introduction date: 1984
- First flight: 1984
- Variant: JDT Hi-MAX

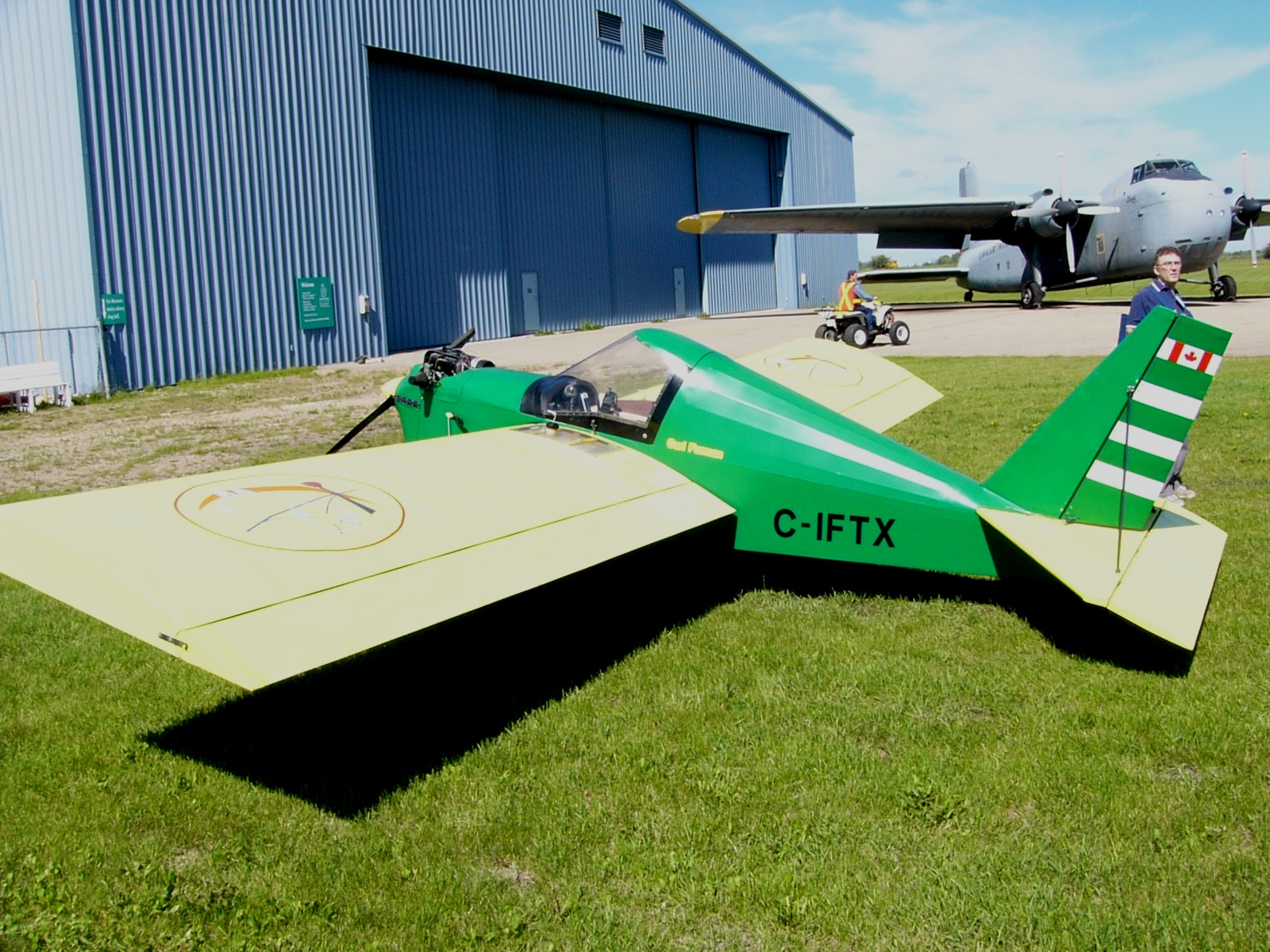
TEAM 1600R Sport

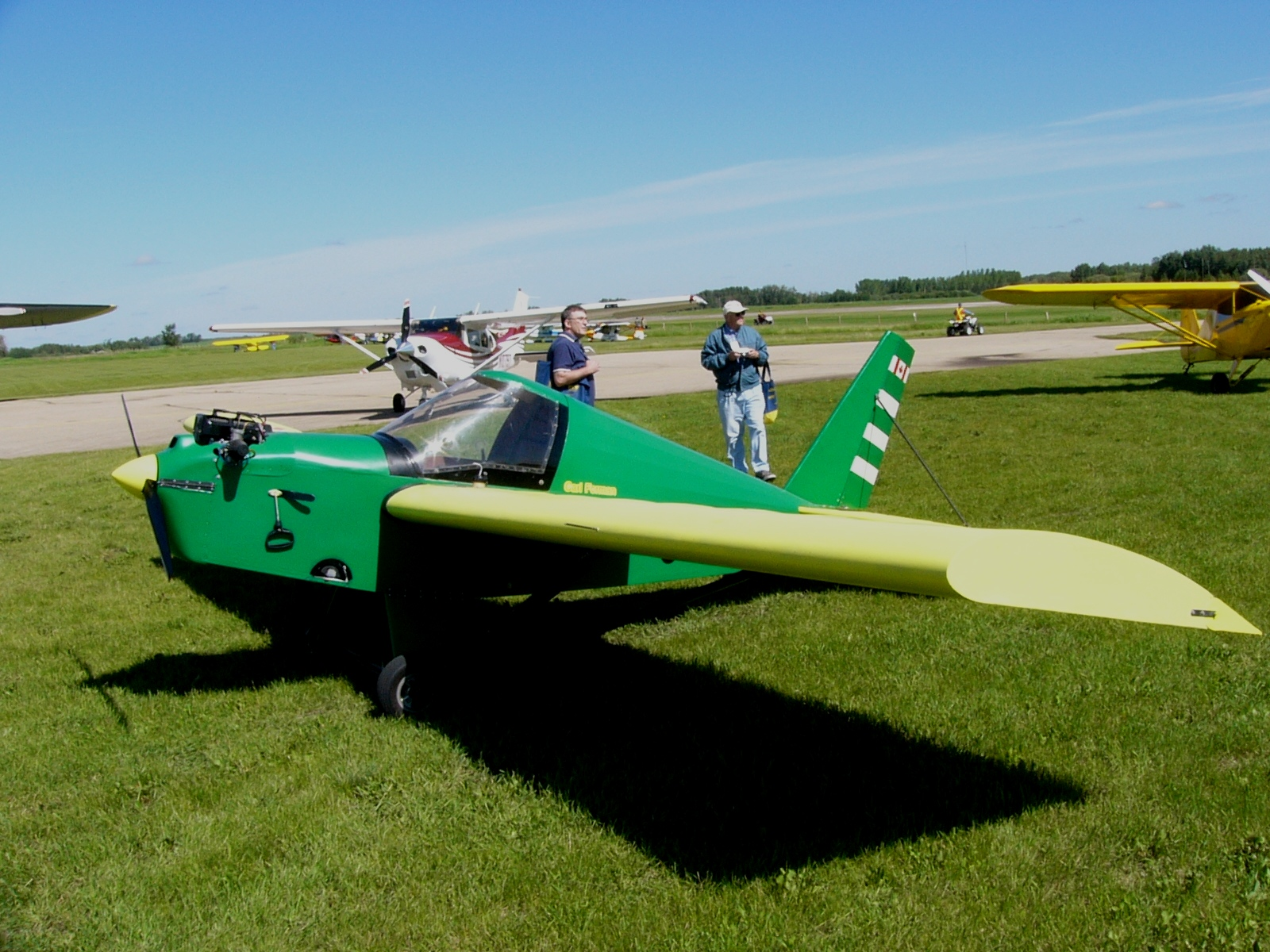
TEAM 1600R Sport

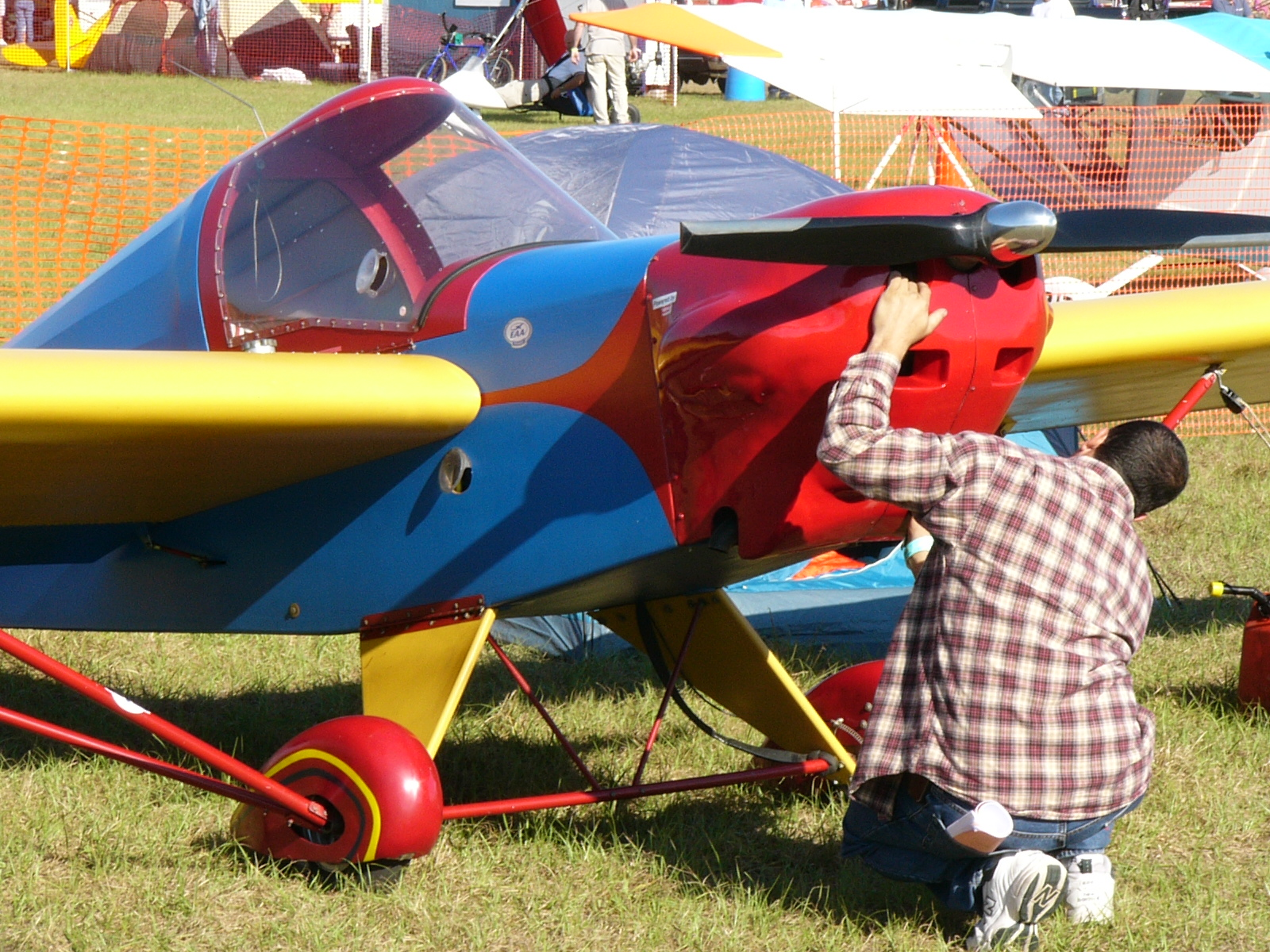
TEAM 1300Z Z-MAX

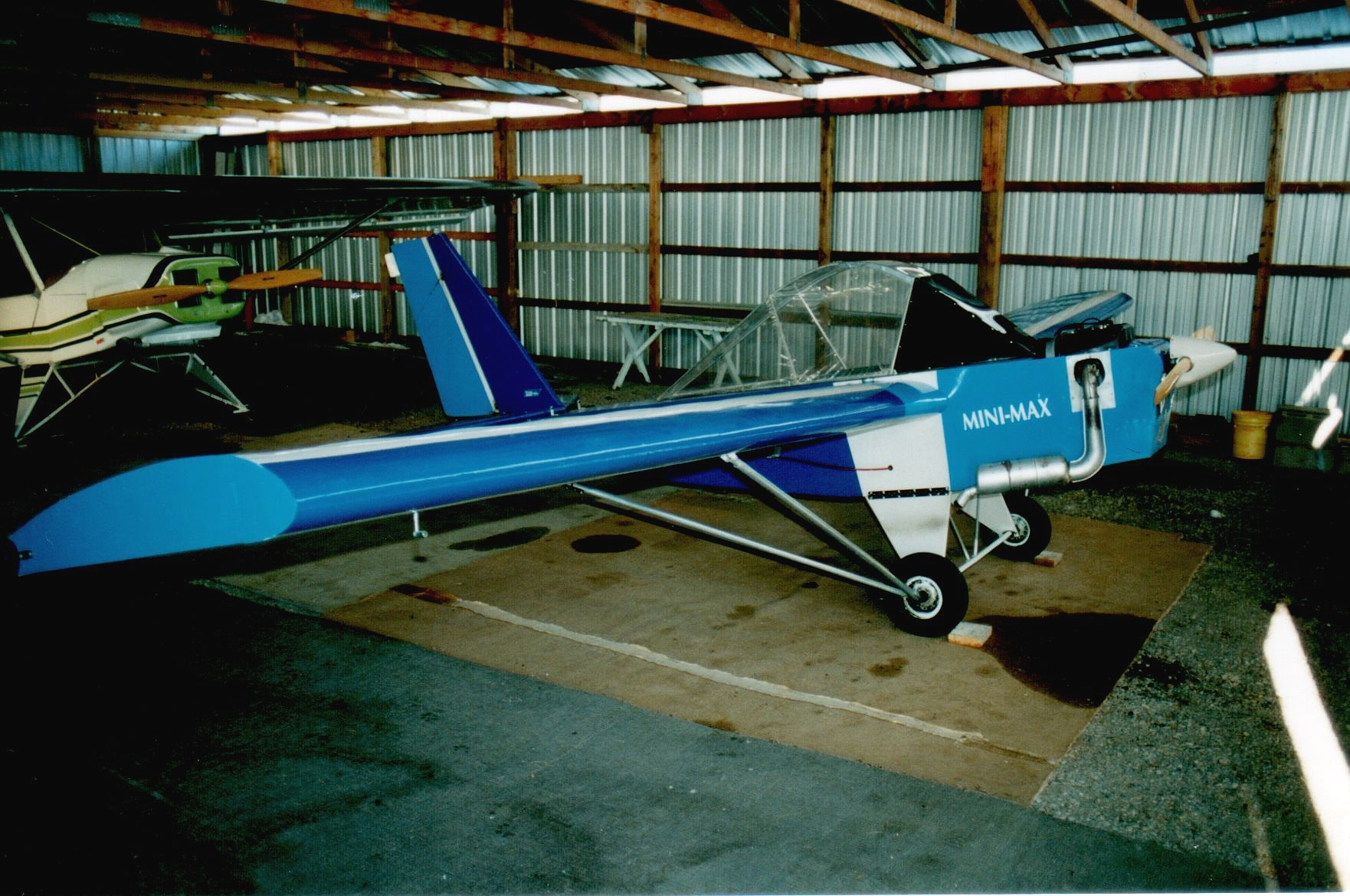
1100R Mini-MAX

The Mini-MAX is a large family of single-seat, mid-wing, strut-braced, single engine aircraft, available in kit form for amateur construction. The first Mini-MAX had its first flight in 1984. Its name indicates its original design goals: a minimum-cost aircraft that requires a minimum of building space, time and skill, but which provides a maximum of enjoyment and performance.

The Mini-MAX family was originally produced by TEAM Incorporated of Bradyville, Tennessee. After that company was bankrupted by a lawsuit, production passed to Ison Aircraft also of Bradyville, Tennessee and next to JDT Mini-MAX of Nappanee, Indiana. The company was renamed Team Mini-Max LLC in 2012, with production in Niles, Michigan. In 2025, Mini-Max USA acquired the rights to all of the Mini-Max Models and took over the factory in Niles, Michigan. The company is still in business producing kits, assisting with builds, and selling plans for the Mini-Max series.

== Development ==
The Mini-MAX models are all predominantly constructed from wood truss with plywood gussets and covered with doped aircraft fabric. The construction time to complete a Mini-MAX varies depending on the model chosen. Many models feature open cockpits equipped with windshields. All versions feature a short-span wing of only 25 ft (7.6 m), except the V-MAX and 1600R EROS, which have a 26.5 ft (8.1 m) wingspan. The wing and horizontal stabilizer are both strut-braced: the wing is braced to the landing gear and the tail is braced from the horizontal tail surface to the fin. All models have conventional landing gear, with wheel pants as an option. Since the wing is braced to the mainwheels and the mainwheels are connected by a rigid axle, the pneumatic tires provide the only suspension.

The aircraft was originally intended to meet the requirements of the US FAR 103 Ultralight Vehicles category, including that category's maximum 254 lb (115 kg) empty weight. The original ultralight models of the Mini-MAX were equipped with the 28 hp (21 kW) Rotax 277 engine to achieve acceptable empty weights. Today the 1030F MAX 103 and 1100F Mini-MAX achieve an acceptable FAR 103 empty weight if they are equipped with the 28 hp (21 kW) Hirth F-33 powerplant or an equivalent weight engine. Other models use heavier engines which place them in the US Experimental - Amateur-built category.

The Mini-MAX was also developed into a high winged version, called the Hi-MAX. The two designs share much in the way of parts and design concept commonality.

== Variants ==
1030R/F MAX-103
Single seat, 22" wide open cockpit, mid-wing aircraft with the 28 hp (21 kW) Rotax 277(1030R) or the 28 hp (21 kW) Hirth F-33 engine(1030F). First flight 1993, and still in production. Manufacturer claimed construction time 350 hours. 250 completed and flown by 2011.
1103F Mini-MAX
Single seat, 24" wide open cockpit, mid-wing aircraft with the 28 hp (21 kW) Rotax 277(1103R) or the 28 hp (21 kW) Hirth F-33 engine(1103F). This model uses the same "Lite Tail" from the 1030F and is otherwise the same aircraft as its 1100R "Big Brother". Still in production. Manufacturer claimed construction time 250-300 hours.
1100R Mini-MAX (the "ORIGINAL")
Single seat, 24" wide open cockpit, mid-wing aircraft with the 40 hp (30 kW) Rotax 447 engine. First flight 1984, still in production. Manufacturer claimed construction time 250-300 hours. 600 completed and flown by 2011.
1200Z Z-MAX
Single seat, 24" wide open cockpit, mid-wing aircraft with the 45 hp (34 kW) Zenoah G-50 engine. First flight 1991, out of production. Manufacturer claimed construction time 350 hours. 124 completed and flown by 2001. As this is a US aircraft the name is pronounced "Zee-Max". This aircraft is still supported by Mini-Max USA and all parts are still produced for it. Plans are still available by request, but it has generally been replaced by the 1500R Sport.
1300Z Z-MAX
Single seat, 24" wide enclosed cockpit, mid-wing aircraft with the 45 hp (34 kW) Zenoah G-50 engine. First flight 1990, out of production. Manufacturer claimed construction time 400 hours. 231 completed and flown by 2001. As this is a US aircraft the name is pronounced "Zee-Max". This aircraft is still supported by Mini-Max USA and all parts are still produced for it. Plans are still available by request, but it has generally been replaced by the 1600R Sport.
1500R Sport
Single seat, 24" wide open cockpit, mid-wing aircraft with the 40 hp (30 kW) Rotax 447 engine. First flight 1987, still in production. Manufacturer claimed construction time 300-350 hours. 200 completed and flown by 2011.
1550V V-MAX
Single seat, 24" wide open cockpit, mid-wing aircraft with the 50 hp (37 kW) Volkswagen air-cooled engine and 26.5 ft (8.1 m) wingspan. First flight 1993, still in production. Manufacturer claimed construction time 325-400 hours. 250 completed and flown by 2011.
1600R Sport
Single seat, 24" wide enclosed cockpit, mid-wing aircraft with the 40 hp (30 kW) Rotax 447. First flight 1989, still in production. Manufacturer claimed construction time 325-400 hours. 315 completed and flown by 2011.
1650R EROS
Single seat, 24" wide enclosed cockpit, mid-wing aircraft with the 50 hp (37 kW) Rotax 503 and 26.5 ft (8.1 m) wingspan. Still in production. Manufacturer claimed construction time 325-400 hours. 300 completed and flown by 2011.

== Specifications (1650R EROS) ==
Data from Aerocrafter, Kitplanes & JDT website

General characteristics

- Crew: one
- Length: 16 ft 0 in (4.88 m)
- Wingspan: 26 ft 6 in (8.08 m)
- Height: 5 ft 0 in (1.52 m)
- Wing area: 118 sq ft (11.0 m^{2})
- Empty weight: 400 lb (181 kg)
- Gross weight: 700 lb (318 kg)
- Fuel capacity: 10 US gallons (38 litres)
- Powerplant: 1 × Rotax 503 twin cylinder, two-stroke aircraft engine, 50 hp (37 kW)

Performance

- Maximum speed: 80 mph (130 km/h, 70 kn)
- Cruise speed: 75 mph (121 km/h, 65 kn)
- Stall speed: 36 mph (58 km/h, 31 kn)
- Never exceed speed: 110 mph (180 km/h, 96 kn)
- Range: 144 mi (232 km, 125 nmi)
- Service ceiling: 12,000 ft (3,700 m)
- g limits: +4.0/-2.0
- Rate of climb: 1,200 ft/min (6.1 m/s)

== See also ==
Aircraft of comparable role, configuration, and era

- Airdrome Eindecker E-III
- Ameri-Cana Eureka
- Fisher Avenger
- Fisher FP-303
- Hummel Bird
- Hummel CA-2
