= Skycycle X-2 =

Steam-powered rocket owned and used by Evel Knievel

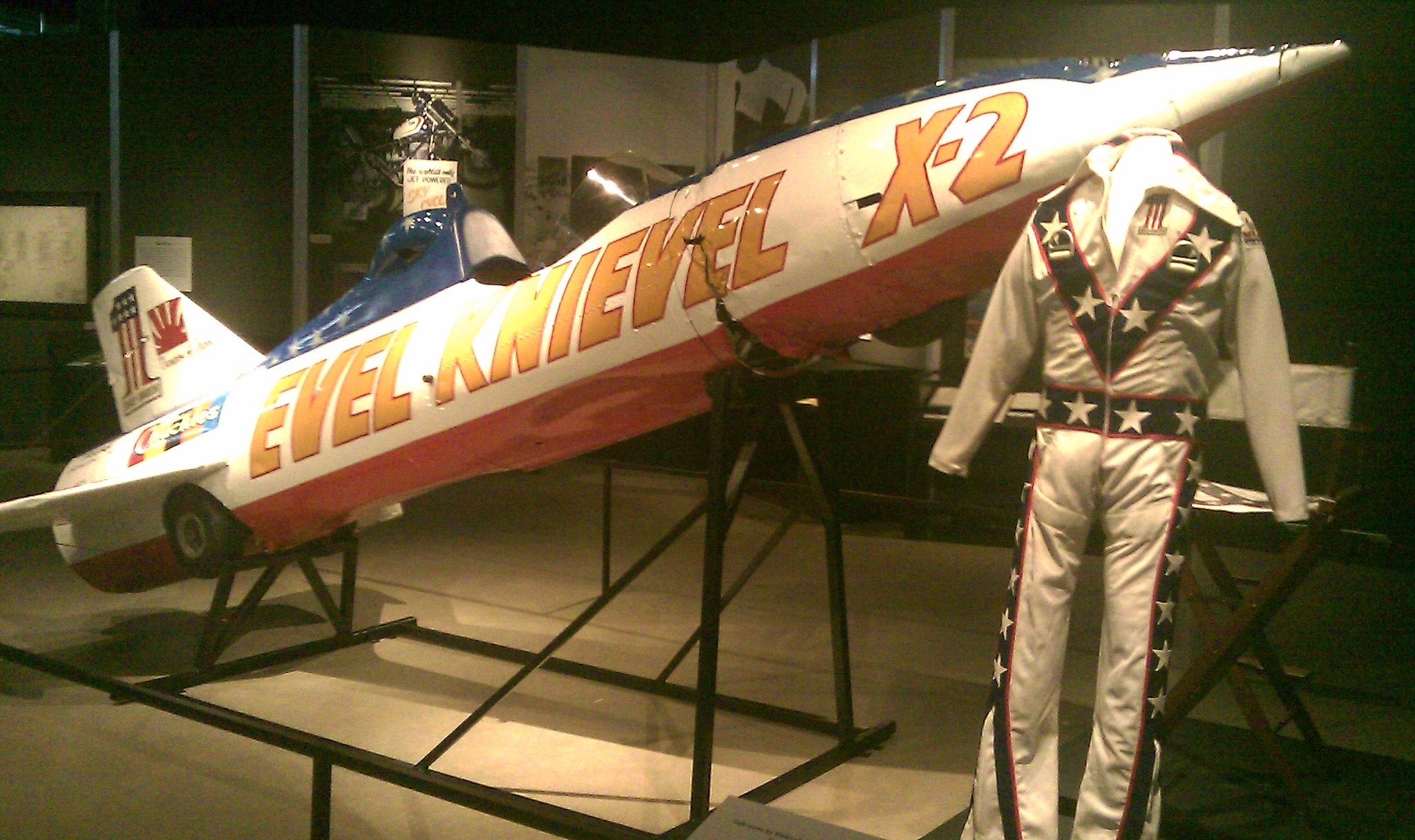
- Evel Knievel's X-2-2 Skycycle on display at the Harley-Davidson Museum in 2010

General information
- Type: Stunt aircraft
- Manufacturer: Robert Truax
- Designer: Douglas Malewicki
- Primary user: Evel Knievel
- Number built: 3

History
- Manufactured: 1974
- First flight: August 25, 1974
- Retired: September 8, 1974

The Skycycle X-2 was a steam-powered rocket owned by Evel Knievel and flown during his Snake River Canyon jump in Idaho in 1974.

An earlier prototype was designed, named the Skycycle X-1, by Doug Malewicki and retired U.S. Navy engineer Robert Truax. It was tested in November 1973 and crashed into the Snake River.

The Skycycle X-2 was designed by Truax and ridden by Knievel in his attempt to jump the Snake River approximately 1 mile (1.6 km) west of Shoshone Falls near the city of Twin Falls, Idaho, on September 8, 1974.

A later analysis showed that a design flaw in a mechanical parachute retention cover that did not properly take base drag into account caused the premature parachute deployment. Following the failed jump, Truax and Knievel blamed each other for the failure. Later, Truax accepted full responsibility for the failure.

== The jump ==
Although the parachute deployed early, the aerial photographs show the X-2 cleared the canyon. However, the winds blew the rocket back to the launch side, crashing at the bottom of the canyon, barely missing the river. Knievel stated that if the X-2 had landed in the water, he would have drowned, as he did not have the ability to release himself from the harness.

In order to obtain permission from the State of Idaho to perform the canyon jump, the X-2 was registered as an airplane rather than a motorcycle.

Three Skycycle X-2s were built for Knievel. The first two were used for test flights. Unable to fund further tests, Knievel used the third for the canyon jump. In 2007, the Skycycle X-2-1 was offered for sale for $5 million. The X-2-2 is owned by the Knievel estate and periodically exhibited along with a museum of Knievel artifacts.

In the era before cable networks, the Sunday afternoon jump was covered live by Top Rank on paid closed-circuit television in several hundred theaters and arenas, promoted by Bob Arum with an average price of ten dollars. Taped coverage by ABC was shown on Wide World of Sports later in the month. The ticket price at the launch site was twenty-five dollars.

The jump was pushed out of the newspaper headlines by the pardon of Richard Nixon by President Gerald Ford.

== Monument ==
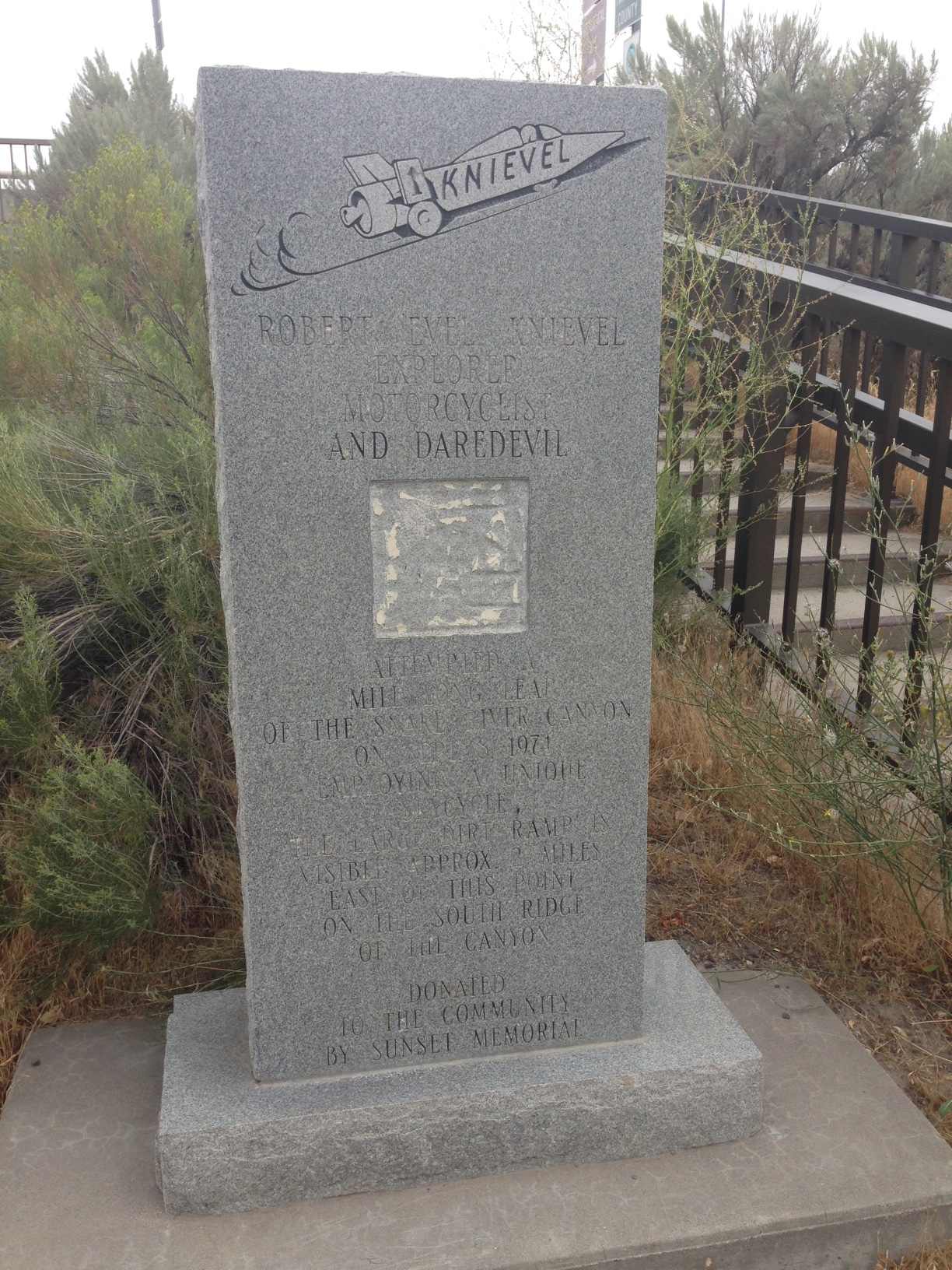
Monument near the Perrine Bridge

A memorial to Knievel is located near the Perrine Bridge, which crosses the Snake River about 1.6 miles (2.6 km) west of the jump site. The monument was dedicated in September 1985 at a small ceremony attended by Knievel.

== Recreation of the jump ==
Since the 1974 launch, seven daredevils have expressed interest in recreating the jump, including Knievel's two sons Robbie and Kelly. Robbie announced he would recreate the jump in 2010, but the project went no further upon his death. Stuntman Eddie Braun worked with Kelly Knievel (son of Evel Knievel) and Scott Truax (son of Robert Truax) to recreate the jump using a replica of the Skycycle X-2. Braun successfully flew his rocket, named Evel Spirit, across the Snake River Canyon on September 16, 2016.

== Audi commercial ==
On July 18, 2012, Audi of America recreated Knievel's Snake River jump in a promotional commercial for the Audi RS5. The commercial depicts the RS5 being driven by a professional driver and jumping the canyon off a jump ramp.

Each time I was hurt, they all said, "that guy is lucky that he's not dead." And they were right. But I wanted to get up and try it again.

— Evel Knievel, 2012 Audi commercial

== See also ==
Aircraft with the same name:

- Carlson Skycycle
- Dart Skycycle
- Fly Hard Trikes SkyCycle
- Lookout Mountain SkyCycle
- Piper PA-8 Skycycle

== Video ==
- Audi - Return to Snake River Canyon commercial
- YouTube – Skycycle test and jump
- YouTube – Skycycle X-2 jump
- Smithsonian Channel – modern-day video of jump area
