= Carlson Skycycle =

General information
- Type: Homebuilt aircraft
- National origin: United States
- Manufacturer: Carlson Aircraft
- Designer: A. Hanford Eckman and Ernst W. Carlson
- Status: Out of production
- Number built: 1

History
- Introduction date: 1995
- Developed from: Piper PA-8 Skycycle

The Carlson Skycycle is an American, single-seat, low-wing, single-engine, homebuilt aircraft that was originally designed by A. Hanford Eckman in 1945 and re-designed as a replica by Ernst W. Carlson and produced by Carlson Aircraft of East Palestine, Ohio in kit form. The prototype was completed in 1995.

The Carlson Skycycle is a full-size replica of the Piper PA-8 Skycycle and the prototype was donated to the Piper Aviation Museum when no orders for the aircraft kit were forthcoming.

== Design and development ==
Carlson Skycycle was conceived by designer Ernst W. Carlson as a tribute to the original design of A. Hanford Eckman at Piper Airplane Corporation. The original PA-8 was intended to have been one of Piper Aircraft]'s post-World War II aircraft models, but only the prototype was built and it did not enter production. Nevertheless, the PA-8 offered good performance, cruising at 100 mph (161 km/h) on just 55 hp (41 kW).

Carlson set out to build a replica as close as possible to the original, working from the only surviving documents, some sketches, a few photographs and one three-view drawing. The original materials were not duplicated and the Carlson model is built with a fiberglass fuselage over a welded steel frame, with a 2024-T3 aluminium tail cone, supported by internal bulkheads. The aircraft has a Plexiglas canopy. The original PA-8's engine was specified, a Lycoming O-145 of 55 hp (41 kW).

Carlson's plan in recreating the Skycycle was to offer kits for sale, but the design requires factory assistance and special tooling to complete and no kits beyond the prototype were completed. Construction time from the kit was intended to be 800 hours.

== Specifications (Skycycle) ==
Data from Kitplanes

General characteristics

- Crew: one
- Length: 15 ft 4 in (4.67 m)
- Wingspan: 20 ft 0 in (6.10 m)
- Height: 5 ft 4 in (1.63 m)
- Wing area: 95 sq ft (8.8 m^{2})
- Empty weight: 500 lb (227 kg)
- Gross weight: 800 lb (363 kg)
- Fuel capacity: 10 US gallons (38 litres)
- Powerplant: 1 × Lycoming O-145 , 55 hp (41 kW)
- Propellers: 2-bladed wooden fixed pitch

Performance

- Maximum speed: 139 mph (224 km/h, 121 kn)
- Cruise speed: 100 mph (160 km/h, 87 kn)
- Stall speed: 55 mph (89 km/h, 48 kn)
- Range: 250 mi (400 km, 220 nmi)
- Service ceiling: 13,000 ft (4,000 m)
- Rate of climb: 875 ft/min (4.45 m/s)
- Wing loading: 8.4 lb/sq ft (41 kg/m^{2})

== See also ==
Aircraft with the same name:

- Dart Skycycle
- Fly Hard Trikes SkyCycle
- Lookout Mountain SkyCycle
- Skycycle X-2

Related development

- Piper PA-8
