= Lookout Mountain SkyCycle =

American ultralight trike

SkyCycle

General information
- Type: Ultralight trike
- National origin: United States
- Manufacturer: Lookout Mountain Flight Park
- Designer: Matt Taber
- Status: Production completed
- Number built: 225 (2005)

History
- Introduction date: 1997

The Lookout Mountain SkyCycle, also marketed as The Freedom Machine, is an American ultralight trike that was designed by Matt Taber, produced by Lookout Mountain Flight Park of Rising Fawn, Georgia and introduced in 1997. The aircraft was supplied as a kit for amateur construction and also as plans.

== Design and development ==
The SkyCycle was designed to be a minimalist nanotrike, capable of using the builder's existing hang glider wing. The aircraft was designed to comply with the US FAR 103 Ultralight Vehicles rules, including the category's maximum empty weight of 254 lb (115 kg). The aircraft has a standard empty weight of 165 lb (75 kg). It features a cable-braced hang glider high-wing, weight-shift controls, a single-seat open cockpit, tricycle landing gear and a single engine in pusher configuration.

The aircraft is made from bolted-together aluminum tubing, with its double-surface Pulse 11 wing covered in Dacron sailcloth. Its 34 ft (10.4 m) span wing is supported by a single tube-type kingpost and uses an "A" frame control bar. The standard engine supplied by the factory was the Zenoah G-25, 22 hp (16 kW), single cylinder, two-stroke, air-cooled aircraft engine

The SkyCycle was intended to be constructed by people who were already hang glider pilots and, in fact, the manufacturer is a large hang gliding school. By keeping the weight down to a minimum the designer envisioned that the builder could use his or her existing hang glider wing for the aircraft. The manufacturer also supplied the Pulse 11 wing for those builders who did not own a hang glider wing. In 2005 the complete aircraft sold for US$7995 with plans selling for US$75. A total of 225 examples had been completed and flown by February 2005.

The aircraft could be quickly dismantled for ground transportation or storage.

== Specifications (Skycycle) ==
Data from Cliche and Kitplanes

General characteristics

- Crew: one
- Length: 15 ft (4.6 m)
- Wingspan: 34 ft (10 m)
- Wing area: 225 sq ft (20.9 m^{2})
- Empty weight: 165 lb (75 kg)
- Gross weight: 465 lb (211 kg)
- Fuel capacity: 2.5 U.S. gallons (9.5 L; 2.1 imp gal)
- Powerplant: 1 × Zenoah G-25 single cylinder, two-stroke, air-cooled aircraft engine, 22 hp (16 kW)

Performance

- Maximum speed: 75 mph (121 km/h, 65 kn)
- Cruise speed: 40 mph (64 km/h, 35 kn)
- Stall speed: 20 mph (32 km/h, 17 kn)
- Range: 120 mi (190 km, 100 nmi)
- Rate of climb: 650 ft/min (3.3 m/s)

== See also ==
Aircraft with the same name:

- Carlson Skycycle
- Dart Skycycle
- Fly Hard Trikes SkyCycle
- Piper PA-8 Skycycle
- Skycycle X-2
