= Team Mini-Max =

American kit aircraft manufacturer

- Company type: Private limited liability company
- Industry: Aerospace
- Headquarters: Niles, Michigan, United States
- Products: Kit aircraft
- Website: www.teammini-max.com

Team Mini-Max, LLC is a kit aircraft manufacturer located in Niles, Michigan. The company produces the Mini-MAX and Hi-MAX lines of aircraft. All the designs feature wooden construction with aircraft fabric covering. The current models offered are powered by either Rotax or Hirth two-stroke or Volkswagen four-stroke engines.

== History ==
The Mini-MAX family was originally produced by TEAM Incorporated (Tennessee Engineering and Manufacturing) of Bradyville, Tennessee. The company was eventually bankrupted by a lawsuit and production passed to Ison Aircraft also of Bradyville, Tennessee and then to JDT Mini-MAX of Nappanee, Indiana. The Mini-MAX name stands for MINImum cost, MAXimum fun.

The company was renamed Team Mini-Max in 2012 and moved to Niles, Michigan.

== Aircraft ==
Summary of aircraft built by JDT Mini-MAX
Model name	First flight	Number built	Type
1030F MAX 103	1984		Single seat, open cockpit, mid-wing aircraft
1100F Mini-MAX			Single seat, open cockpit, mid-wing aircraft
1100R Mini-MAX	1984		Single seat, open cockpit, mid-wing aircraft
1500R Sport	1987		Single seat, open cockpit, mid-wing aircraft
1600R Sport	1989		Single seat, enclosed cockpit, mid-wing aircraft
1550V V-MAX	1993		Single seat, open cockpit, mid-wing aircraft
1650R EROS			Single seat, enclosed cockpit, mid-wing aircraft
1700R Hi-MAX	1987		Single seat high wing ultralight
AeroMax	2012	1	Single seat high wing light-sport aircraft
