= Piper PA-8 =

Single-seat American light aircraft of 1948

PA-8 Skycycle

General information
- Type: Light aircraft
- Manufacturer: Piper Aircraft
- Designer: A. Hanford Eckman
- Number built: 2

History
- First flight: 1945
- Variants: Carlson Skycycle

The Piper PA-8 Skycycle was a 1940s American single-seat light aircraft designed and built by Piper Aircraft at their Lock Haven, Pennsylvania plant. Towards the end of 1944 Piper announced a number of aircraft it intended to build after the second world war. One of these was the PWA-8, (Post War Airplane 8) an aerodynamic test aircraft was built with the name Cub Cycle and it first flew on 27 August 1944 with a small two–cylinder Franklin Engine. The Franklin engine was replaced by a four–cylinder Continental A-40-3 of 37 hp (28 kW); the aircraft first flew with the Continental engine on 12 September 1944. The Skycycle was a fabric-covered mid-wing single-engined single-seat monoplane with a tailwheel landing gear. The fuselage was produced using an auxiliary belly fuel tank as used on the F4U Corsair. The Cub Cycle was scrapped and a similar but new aircraft was built with the name Skycycle, which first flew on 29 January 1945 using the same Continental engine as the Cub Cycle. The aircraft was further modified in 1945 with a four-cylinder 55 hp (41 kW) Lycoming O-145-A2 engine and designated the PA-8 Skycycle. No further examples were built.

A replica of the PA-8 Skycycle, the Carlson Skycycle, was built in 1995 by Ernst W. Carlson and produced by Carlson Aircraft of East Palestine, Ohio. Carlson intended to sell the aircraft in kit form, but no orders were forthcoming and the prototype was donated to the Piper Aviation Museum, since the original PA-8 was no longer in existence.

== Specifications (PA-8) ==
Data from

General characteristics

- Crew: 1
- Length: 15 ft 8 in (4.78 m)
- Wingspan: 20 ft 0 in (6.10 m)
- Height: 5 ft 0 in (1.52 m)
- Gross weight: 630 lb (286 kg)
- Powerplant: 1 × Lycoming O-145-A2 four-cylinder horizontally opposed air-cooled, 55 hp (41 kW)

Performance

- Maximum speed: 120 mph (190 km/h, 100 kn)
- Cruise speed: 95 mph (153 km/h, 83 kn)
- Range: 400 mi (640 km, 350 nmi) with reserves

== See also ==
Aircraft with the same name:

- Carlson Skycycle
- Dart Skycycle
- Fly Hard Trikes SkyCycle
- Lookout Mountain SkyCycle
- Skycycle X-2

Aircraft of comparable role, configuration, and era

- Lockheed Little Dipper
