= Fly Hard Trikes SkyCycle =

American ultralight trike

SkyCycle

General information
- Type: Ultralight trike
- National origin: United States
- Manufacturer: Fly Hard Trikes
- Designer: Mike Theeke
- Status: Out of production
- Number built: Several hundred

The Fly Hard Trikes SkyCycle was an American ultralight trike, designed by Mike Theeke and produced by Fly Hard Trikes of Wildwood, Georgia. The aircraft was supplied as a complete ready-to-fly-aircraft and several hundred were completed and flown. Production ended with the owner's death in 2020.

== Design and development ==
The SkyCycle was designed to comply with the US FAR 103 Ultralight Vehicles rules, including the category's maximum empty weight of 254 lb (115 kg). The aircraft has a standard empty weight of 205 lb (93 kg) in its "S" model. It features a cable-braced or optionally a strut-braced hang glider-style high-wing, weight-shift controls, a single-seat open cockpit with a small cockpit fairing, tricycle landing gear and a single engine in pusher configuration.

The aircraft is made from bolted-together aluminum tubing, with its single surface wing covered in Dacron sailcloth. Its 32.9 ft (10.0 m) span wing uses an "A" frame weight-shift control bar. The powerplant is a twin cylinder, air-cooled, two-stroke, single-ignition 40 hp (30 kW) Rotax 447 engine or the twin-cylinder, in-line, two-stroke 32 hp (24 kW) Kawasaki 340. With the Kawasaki 340 engine the aircraft has an empty weight of 205 lb (93 kg) and a gross weight of 400 lb (181 kg), giving a useful load of 195 lb (88 kg). With full fuel of 5 U.S. gallons (19 L; 4.2 imp gal) the payload is 165 lb (75 kg).

A number of different wings can be fitted to the basic carriage, including the strut-braced North Wing Maverick III and the Airborne Sting 175.

An electric-powered version was reportedly under development in 2011.

== Operational history ==
The aircraft has won many awards including, 2007 Sun 'n Fun Best Type Trike Ultralight, 2008 Sun 'n Fun Outstanding Weight Shift Ultralight, 2009 Sun 'n Fun Grand Champion and Best Commercial Ultralight, 2010 Sun 'n Fun Best Type Trike Ultralight and Best Commercial Ultralight, 2011 Sun 'n Fun Best Type Trike Ultralight and 2012 Sun 'n Fun Grand Champion.

== Variants ==
SkyCycle S
Model with the 32 hp (24 kW) Kawasaki 340 powerplant, North Wing Maverick III strut-braced wing, cockpit fairing and an empty weight of 205 lb (93 kg).
SkyCycle Firefly
Nanotrike version with the 24 hp (18 kW) Zenoah G25 engine, the Airborne Sting 175 wing, instrument pod only in place of the cockpit fairing and an empty weight of 110 lb (50 kg).

== Specifications (SkyCycle S) ==
Data from Bayerl

General characteristics

- Crew: one
- Wingspan: 32 ft 10 in (10.0 m)
- Wing area: 160 sq ft (14.9 m^{2})
- Empty weight: 205 lb (93 kg)
- Gross weight: 400 lb (181 kg)
- Fuel capacity: 5 U.S. gallons (19 L; 4.2 imp gal)
- Powerplant: 1 × Kawasaki 340 two cylinder, air-cooled, two stroke snowmobile engine, 32 hp (24 kW)
- Propellers: 3-bladed composite

Performance

- Maximum speed: 65 mph (105 km/h, 57 kn)
- Stall speed: 25 mph (40 km/h, 22 kn)
- Rate of climb: 590 ft/min (3.0 m/s)
- Wing loading: 2.5 lb/sq ft (12 kg/m^{2})

== See also ==
Aircraft with the same name:

- Carlson Skycycle
- Dart Skycycle
- Lookout Mountain SkyCycle
- Piper PA-8 Skycycle
- Skycycle X-2
