= ISON Airbike =

Type of aircraft

Airbike & Tandem Airbike
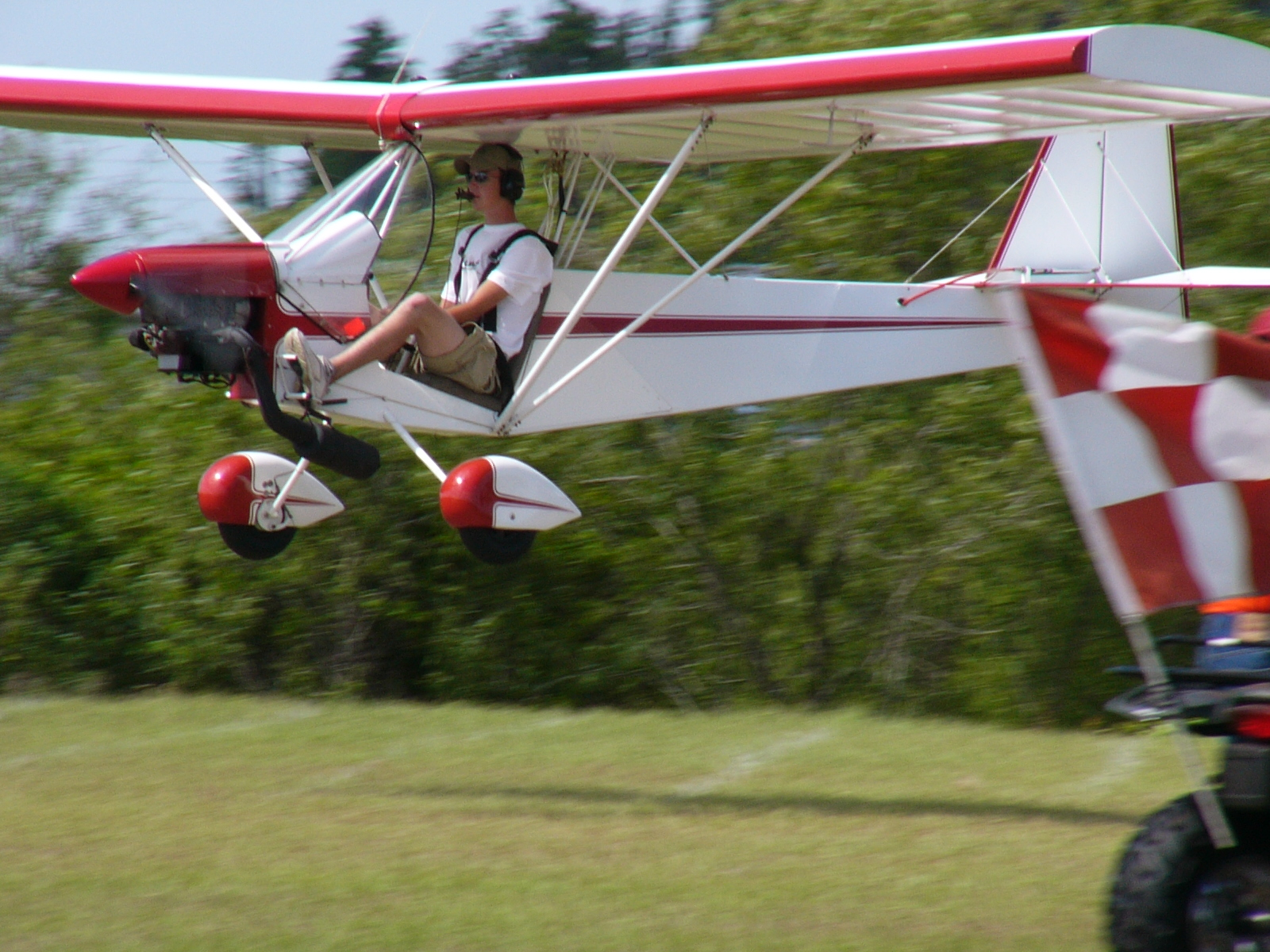
- An Airbike at Sun 'n Fun 2004

General information
- Type: Ultralight aircraft
- National origin: United States
- Manufacturer: TEAM Aircraft; ISON Aircraft; Jordan Lake Aero
- Designer: Wayne Ison
- Status: In production (2013)
- Number built: 127 (December 1999)

History
- Introduction date: 1994
- First flight: 1994

The ISON Airbike and Tandem Airbike are a family of American high-wing, tractor configuration ultralight aircraft, that were available in kit form. The single-seat Airbike was introduced in 1994 and the two-seat Tandem Airbike was unveiled in 1996.

Originally produced by TEAM Aircraft of Bradyville, Tennessee, manufacturing passed to ISON Aircraft, also of Bradyville, before the end of kit production. Starting circa 2009 kits became available, once again, this time from Jordan Lake Aero.

== Development ==
The single seat Airbike was designed to meet the requirements of the United States FAR 103 Ultralight Vehicles, including the maximum 254 lb (115 kg) empty weight. The tandem-seat model was intended to be licensed as an ultralight trainer or an amateur-built aircraft.

The single-seater can achieve an empty weight as low as 251 lb (114 kg) with the use of a light-weight engine, such as the 28 hp (21 kW) Rotax 277 or the 22 hp (16 kW) Zenoah G-25.

The name Airbike was chosen for the aircraft because it has a narrow fuselage and the pilot's feet rest on rudder pedals that are on the outside of the aircraft, in a similar manner to a motorcycle.

The Tandem Airbike retains all of the single-seater's features and has a stretched fuselage to accommodate the second seat. It uses a wing of 33.8 ft (10.3 m) span with an area of 152 sq ft (14.14 sq m).

== Design ==
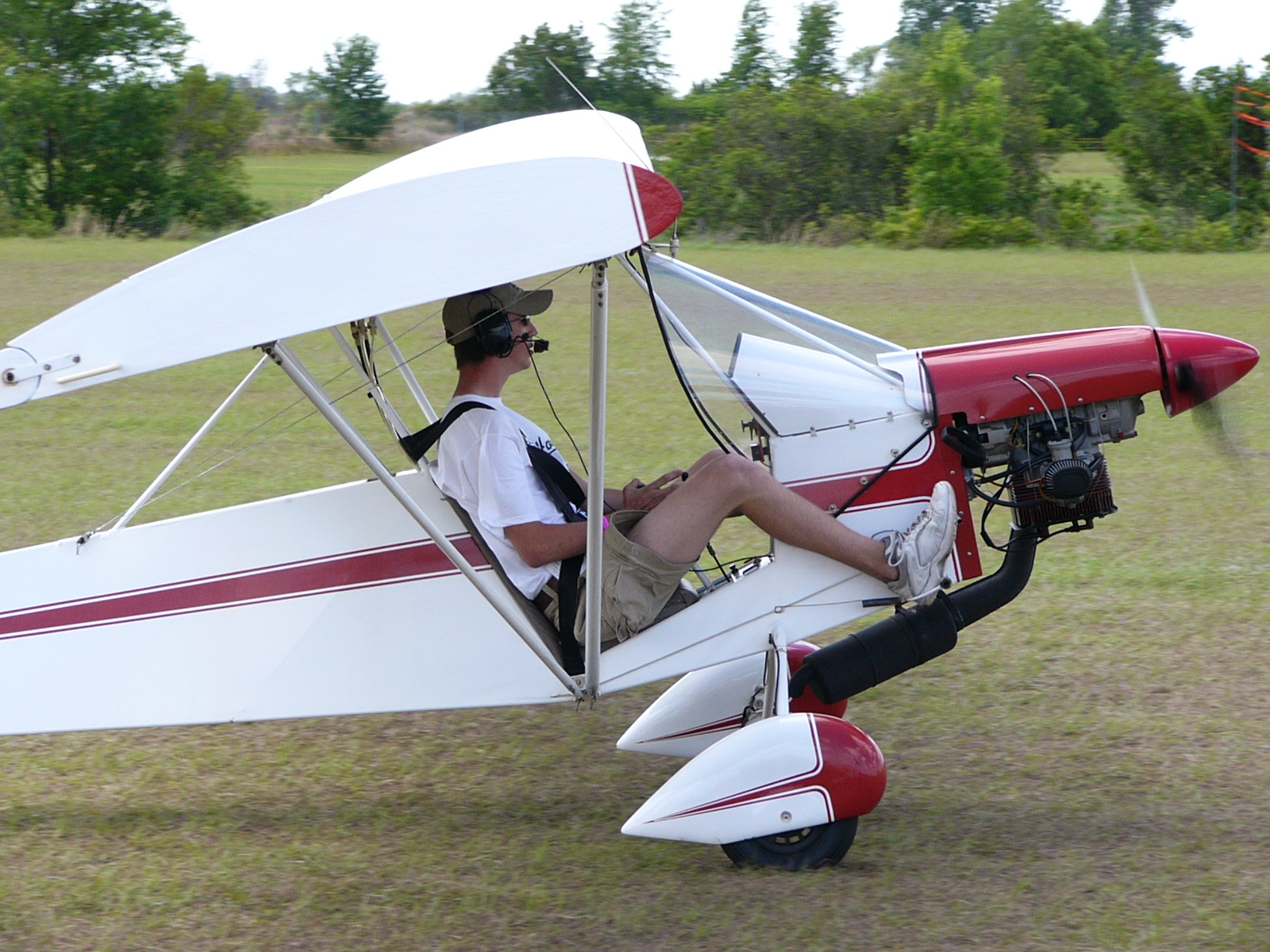
An Airbike at Sun 'n Fun 2004 showing the external rudder pedals

Both variants feature a parasol wing constructed from wood and covered with aircraft fabric. The wing has full-span ailerons or, in the case of the two-seater, optional electrically actuated flaperons. All controls are cable-operated. The elevator and rudder are conventional.

The fuselage is made from welded 4130 steel tube and the aircraft has conventional landing gear with tail wheel steering connected to the rudder pedals. The main landing gear utilises sprung-tubes for suspension and absorbing landing loads.

The Airbike was sold as an assembly kit. The kit included a pre-welded fuselage and tail, pre-built main wing spars and ribs, all brackets and fittings, landing gear, engine, propeller, instruments and a five-gallon fuel tank. The company estimated the time to complete the aircraft at 150 hours for the single-seater. The price in 2001 for the single-seat Airbike was US$7195

The Tandem Airbike had a factory estimated construction time of 200–300 hours or 100–150 hours if the quick-built kit option was purchased. In 2001 the kits price was US$8000 without engine or propeller.

== Operational history ==
In December 1998 the company reported that 127 single-seaters were flying (the majority as US unregistered ultralights) and 23 tandem-seaters. In July 2009 there were 45 Airbikes registered as experimental amateur-builts or light sport aircraft in the USA.

== Variants ==
Airbike
Single seat aircraft designed for the US ultralight category. Engine options were the 28 hp (21 kW) Rotax 277, 40 hp (30 kW) Rotax 447 or 22 hp (16 kW) Zenoah G-25.
Tandem Airbike
Two-seat aircraft designed as an ultralight trainer or amateur-built. Standard engine was the 50 hp (37 kW) Rotax 503.

== Specifications (Airbike with Rotax 447) ==
Data from KitPlanes & Cliche

General characteristics

- Crew: one
- Length: 16 ft 0 in (4.88 m)
- Wingspan: 26 ft 0 in (7.93 m)
- Height: 5 ft 6 in (1.68 m)
- Wing area: 118 sq ft (10.98 m^{2})
- Empty weight: 257 lb (116 kg)
- Max takeoff weight: 560 lb (254 kg)
- Powerplant: 1 × Rotax 447 fixed pitch, 40 hp (30 kW)

Performance

- Maximum speed: 80 mph (130 km/h, 70 kn)
- Cruise speed: 63 mph (102 km/h, 55 kn)
- Stall speed: 30 mph (49 km/h, 26 kn)
- Range: 173 mi (279 km, 150 nmi)
- Rate of climb: 1,000 ft/min (5.1 m/s)
- Wing loading: 4.75 lb/sq ft (23.1 kg/m^{2})
- Power/mass: 14 lb/hp (0.12 kW/kg)

== See also ==
Aircraft of comparable role, configuration, and era

- Affordaplane
- Milholland Legal Eagle
- Avid Champion
- Beaujon Enduro
- Capella Javelin
- Dart Skycycle
- Freebird I
- Wings of Freedom Flitplane
