= Dart Skycycle =

American homebuilt aircraft

General information
- Type: Ultralight aircraft
- National origin: United States
- Manufacturer: Dart Aircraft
- Designer: Robert Dart
- Status: Production completed

History
- Introduction date: 1985

The Dart Skycycle is an American single-seat, high wing, strut-braced, single-engine, conventional landing gear ultralight aircraft that was designed by Robert Dart and produced by Dart Aircraft of Mayville, New York for amateur construction.

== Design and development ==
Introduced in 1985, the Skycycle is a single-seater designed as an FAR 103 Ultralight Vehicles-compliant aircraft with an empty weight within that category's 254 lb (115 kg) empty weight limit.

The aircraft has a 4130 steel tube frame fuselage and a wing constructed from spruce, all covered in doped fabric. The landing gear is bungee-suspended. The Skycycle can be built with an open cockpit or fully enclosed, allowing flying in cooler weather. The Skycycle was available as plans only or with some prefabricated components, such as the welded fuselage or assembled wings already completed. The standard engine specified was the 28 hp (21 kW) Rotax 277.

Reviewer Andre Cliche wrote: "The Skycycle is an ultralight-legal aircraft that resembles the average taildraggers of the 40s and 50s. It looks like a 'real airplane' and should satisfy the more conservative pilots who hesitate to fly 'colourful lawn chairs' as basic ultralights are sometimes called. It is a good all-around ultralight that is easy to fly and cheap to operate."

== Specifications (Skycycle) ==
Data from Cliche

General characteristics

- Crew: one
- Length: 20 ft 0 in (6.10 m)
- Wingspan: 30 ft 0 in (9.14 m)
- Wing area: 145 sq ft (13.5 m^{2})
- Empty weight: 253 lb (115 kg)
- Gross weight: 543 lb (246 kg)
- Fuel capacity: 5 US gallons (19 litres)
- Powerplant: 1 × Rotax 277 , 28 hp (21 kW)
- Propellers: 2-bladed wooden

Performance

- Cruise speed: 55 mph (89 km/h, 48 kn)
- Stall speed: 27 mph (43 km/h, 23 kn)
- Wing loading: 3.8 lb/sq ft (19 kg/m^{2})

== See also ==
Aircraft with the same name:

- Carlson Skycycle
- Fly Hard Trikes SkyCycle
- Lookout Mountain SkyCycle
- Piper PA-8 Skycycle
- Skycycle X-2

Aircraft of comparable role, configuration, and era

- Affordaplane
- Avid Champion
- Denney Kitfox
- Wood Sky Pup
