= Bradyville, Tennessee =

- Unincorporated community
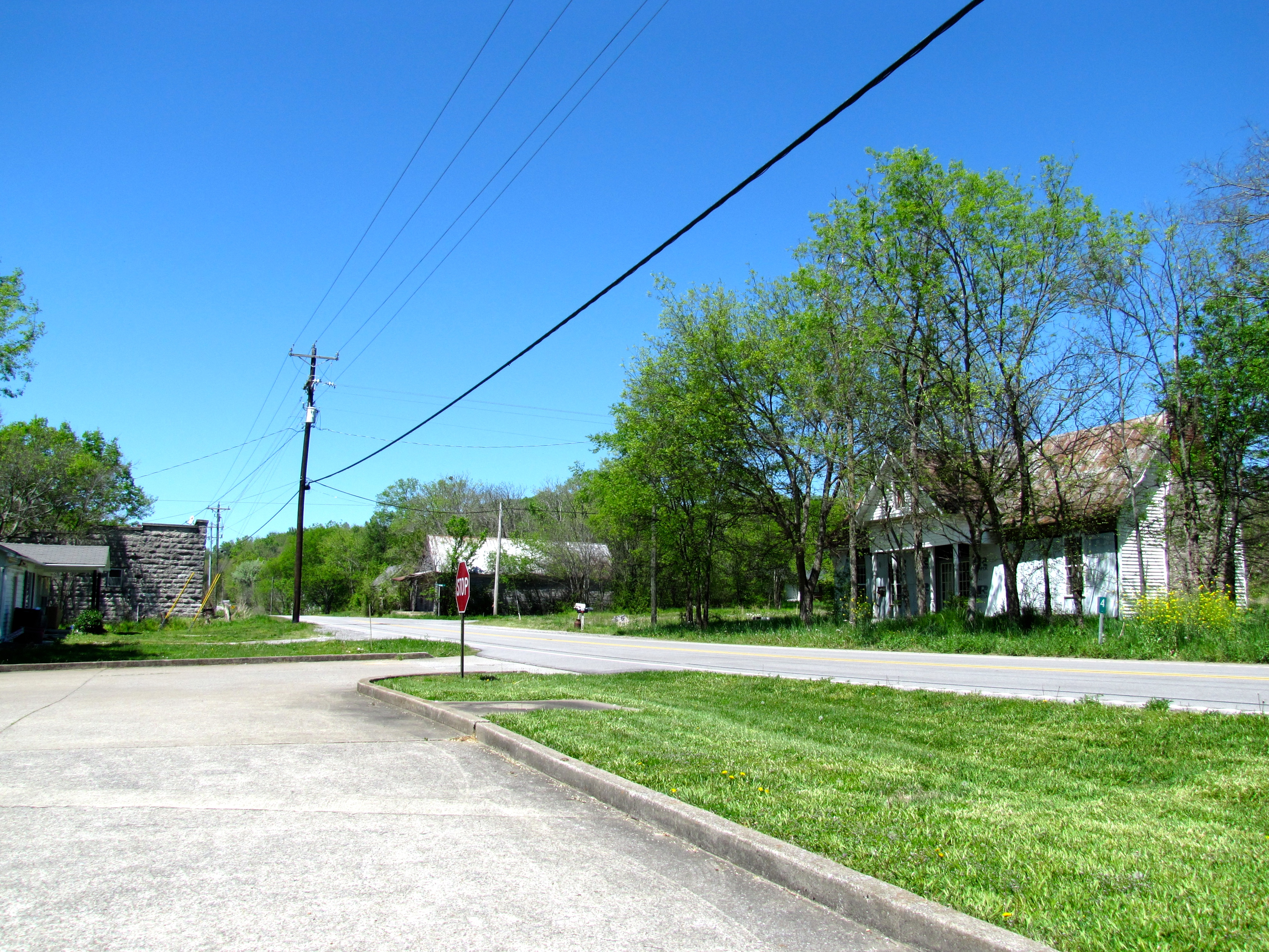
- State Route 64 in Bradyville

- Location within Tennessee Location within the United States
- Coordinates: 35°44′23″N 86°09′56″W
- Country: United States
- State: Tennessee
- County: Cannon
- Elevation: 755 ft (230 m)
- Time zone: UTC-6 (Central (CST))
  - Summer (DST): UTC-5 (CDT)
- ZIP code: 37026
- Area code: 615
- GNIS feature ID: 1305387

Bradyville is an unincorporated community in Cannon County, United States. Its ZIP code is 37026. It is situated along Tennessee State Route 64 in a hilly area of southwestern Cannon County.

== History ==
Bradyville was named for William Brady, a local pioneer. A post office called Bradyville has been in operation since 1837.
