= Norman Aviation Nordic VII =

Canadian homebuilt light aircraft

Nordic VII
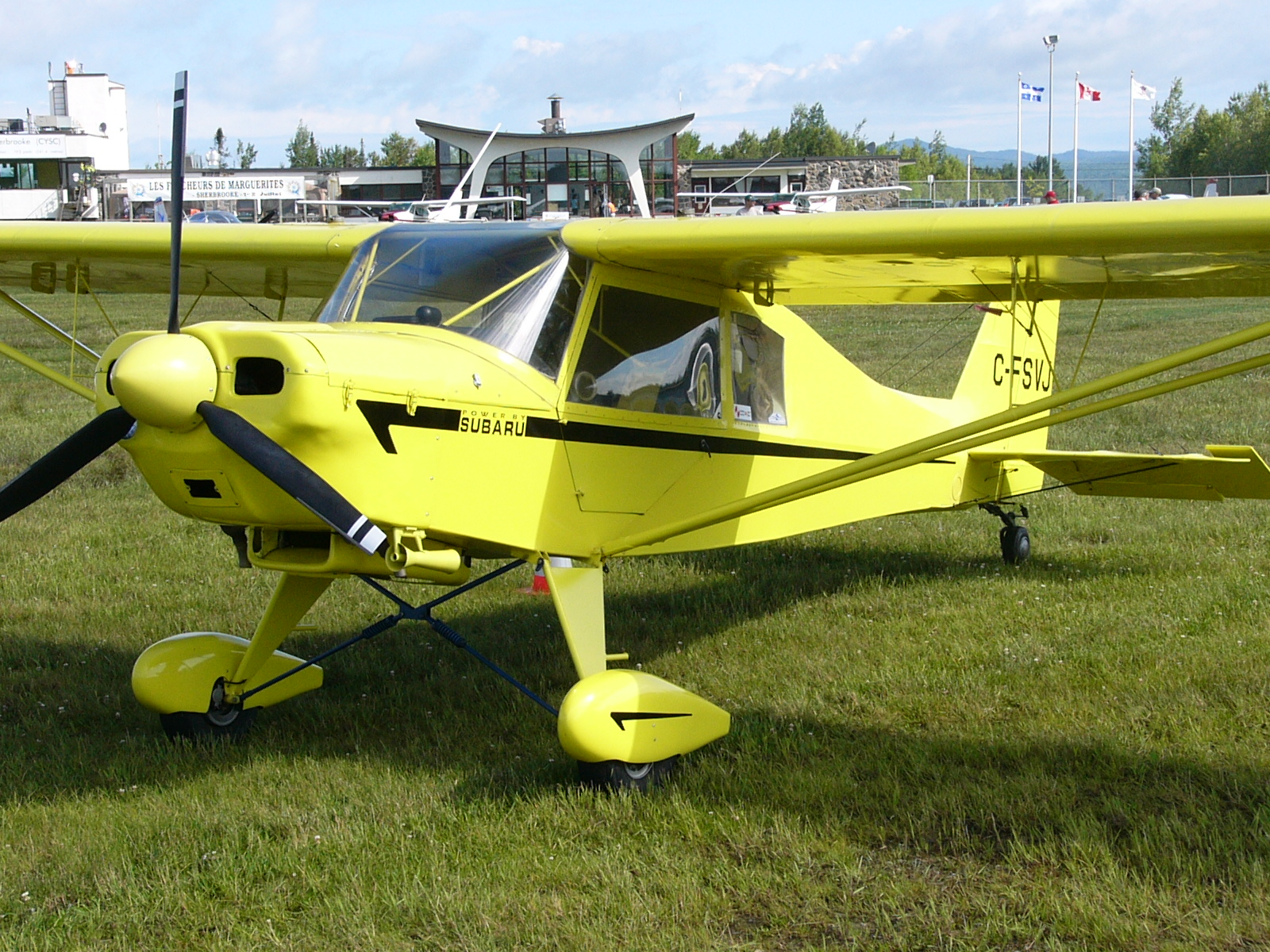

General information
- Type: Ultralight aircraft
- National origin: Canada
- Manufacturer: Norman Aviation
- Designer: Jacques Norman
- Status: Production completed

History
- Developed from: Norman Aviation Nordic VI

The Norman Aviation Nordic VII is a Canadian advanced ultralight aircraft, that was designed by Jacques Norman and produced by Norman Aviation of Saint-Anselme, Quebec. The aircraft was supplied as a kit for amateur construction or as a complete ready-to-fly-aircraft.

Production is complete and the Nordic VII is no longer available.

== Design and development ==
The Nordic VII was designed to comply with the Canadian ultralight rules. It features a strut-braced high-wing, a two-seats-in-side-by-side configuration enclosed cockpit with doors, fixed conventional landing gear and a single engine in tractor configuration.

The aircraft fuselage is made from welded steel tubing, with its wings made from wood and all surfaces covered in doped aircraft fabric. Its 33.80 ft (10.3 m) span wing has an area of 135 m^{2} (1,450 sq ft) and mounts flaps. The wing is supported by V-struts and jury struts. The standard engines supplied were 90 to 100 hp (67 to 75 kW) Subaru EA four-stroke powerplants.

The cockpit width is 41 in (104 cm), 2 in (5.1 cm) wider than the Nordic II. The Nordic VII also has a swept tail, which differentiates it from the Nordic VI. The wing has slightly greater span than the Nordic VI, but less area, giving the Nordic VII a 5 mph (8.0 km/h) higher stall speed and a lower rate of climb, but a faster cruise speed.

Construction time from the factory supplied kit is estimated at 300 hours.

== Operational history ==
In November 2016 there were two Nordic VIIs on the Transport Canada Civil Aviation Register.

== Specifications (Nordic VII) ==
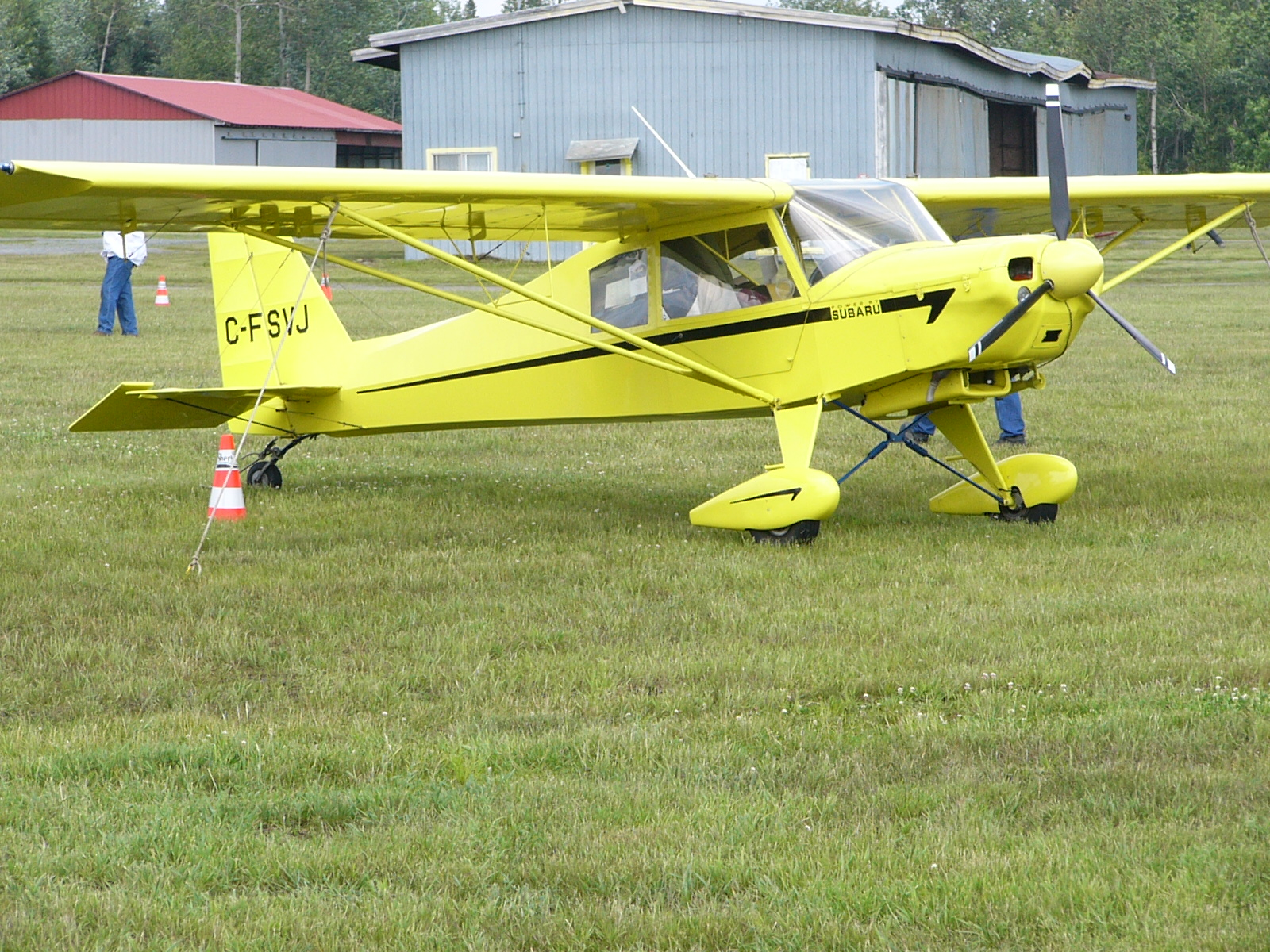
Norman Aviation Nordic VII

Data from Purdy

General characteristics

- Crew: one
- Capacity: one passenger
- Length: 20.17 ft (6.15 m)
- Wingspan: 33.80 ft (10.30 m)
- Wing area: 135 sq ft (12.5 m^{2})
- Empty weight: 625 lb (283 kg)
- Gross weight: 1,058 lb (480 kg)
- Fuel capacity: 12 U.S. gallons (45 L; 10.0 imp gal)
- Powerplant: 1 × Subaru EA engine four cylinder, air-cooled, four stroke automotive engine, 100 hp (75 kW)
- Propellers: 2-bladed composite

Performance

- Maximum speed: 115 mph (185 km/h, 100 kn)
- Cruise speed: 105 mph (169 km/h, 91 kn)
- Stall speed: 40 mph (64 km/h, 35 kn)
- Range: 350 mi (560 km, 300 nmi)
- Service ceiling: 10,000 ft (3,000 m)
- Rate of climb: 500 ft/min (2.5 m/s)
- Wing loading: 7.8 lb/sq ft (38 kg/m^{2})
