= Pilot licensing in Canada =

Canadian aircraft pilot licensing

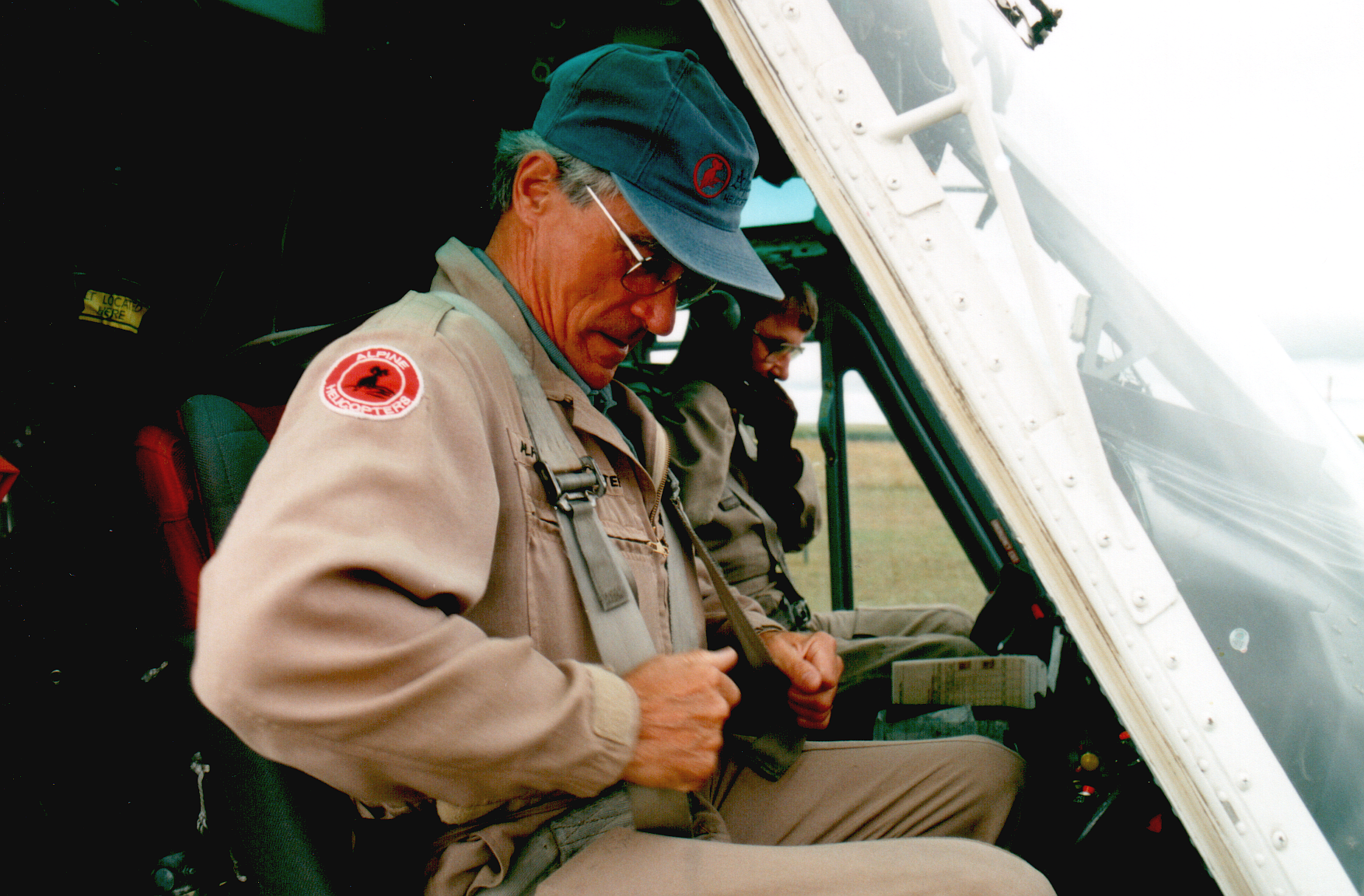
A Bell 212 crew from Alpine Helicopters scrambles on a medevac mission. Both the aircraft captain (right seat) and the copilot (left seat) in this case are holders of the Airline Transport Pilot Licence - Helicopter.

Pilot licensing in Canada is administered by Transport Canada under the Aeronautics Act and the Canadian Aviation Regulations (CARs).

Other than when flying a hang glider or paraglider, a person may only operate a Canadian-registered aircraft or act as a flight crew member in Canada with a licence or permit issued by Transport Canada.

At the end of 2008 there were 64,932 Canadian licences and permits held, giving Canada the second largest population of licensed pilots in the world.

The first Canadian private pilot's licence was issued to James Stanley Scott on January 24, 1920, and the first Canadian transport licence was issued to Douglas G. Joy on April 1, 1939.

== Overview ==
A licence is issued by Transport Canada in accordance with International Civil Aviation Organization (ICAO) licence Standards And Recommended Practices (SARPs). A licence can be used to fly domestically as well as internationally, while a permit does not comply with ICAO standards and therefore can only be used within Canada, unless accepted by another country. In April 1920 the first commercial pilot licence in Canada was issued to Roland Groome.

Pilots with licences from foreign countries that are ICAO contracting states may apply to Transport Canada for a validation of their foreign licence. This allows them to fly Canadian registered aircraft in Canada. A foreign licence may be used to fly an aircraft registered in the same state as the licence while in Canada.

The term licence in Canada is equivalent to the term certificate in the United States. The term licence is also used in the United Kingdom. Under the ICAO they are all legally equivalent.

The most common type of Canadian licence is the private pilot licence—aeroplane, which is used to fly light general aviation aircraft privately and recreationally. At the end of 2008 there were 27,138 aeroplane and 596 helicopter private pilot licences in force in Canada. The rarest licence or permit in Canada is the gyroplane pilot permit, with only 29 in force at the end of 2008.

=== Ratings ===
Every permit and licence has one or more ratings. A rating is a Transport Canada endorsement that grants additional special privileges. For example, a night rating allows a pilot to fly at night.

Each aircraft model requires different knowledge and skill to fly. For example, a single engine general aviation aircraft's design and operation is fundamentally different from a gyroplane. Type ratings allow a pilot to fly a specific aircraft model or series. The CARs use the term type instead of model.

Some aircraft are covered by a blanket type rating which is applicable to a grouping of aircraft types. For example, the aeroplanes blanket type rating covers all non-high performance, single engine aeroplanes that have a minimum flight crew requirement of one pilot. Examples of this type of aircraft are the Cessna 172 and the Piper Cherokee. These are considered similar enough that specific ratings are not required for each type.

Other aircraft types are covered only by individual type ratings that apply to a single specific model of aircraft. For example, all helicopters are significantly different that each one requires an individual type rating. A person with a private pilot licence—helicopter with a rating for the Bell 407 helicopter may fly only that type of helicopter. The specific privileges and requirements for each rating are detailed in the CARs.

Other than aircraft type ratings there are ratings that allow instrument flying, night flying, VFR over-the-top, ultra-light passenger carrying and other pilot privileges.

== Permits and licences ==
=== Student pilot permit ===
Before earning a permit, a student pilot may only practice dual instruction with an instructor. With a student pilot permit, a student pilot may fly solo under the supervision of a flight instructor and for purposes of flight training only. Only domestic day flying under visual flight rules (VFR) is allowed under this permit and no passengers may be carried.

A student pilot permit is required for each aircraft category which a person is training for and is available for the following aircraft categories:

- Aeroplane
- Balloon
- Glider
- Gyroplane
- Helicopter
- Ultra-light aeroplane

In order to obtain a student pilot permit, a student must sit and pass the PSTAR examination and hold a valid Category 1, 3, or 4 medical.

=== Gyroplane pilot permit ===
The gyroplane pilot permit allows the holder to fly a gyroplane. Until endorsed with other ratings, only domestic day flying under VFR is allowed under this permit.

The gyroplane pilot permit is endorsed with a blanket type rating for all single seat gyroplanes. There is no blanket type rating for two-seat gyroplanes and a type rating is required for each specific model of two-seat gyroplane.

=== Ultra-light pilot permit ===
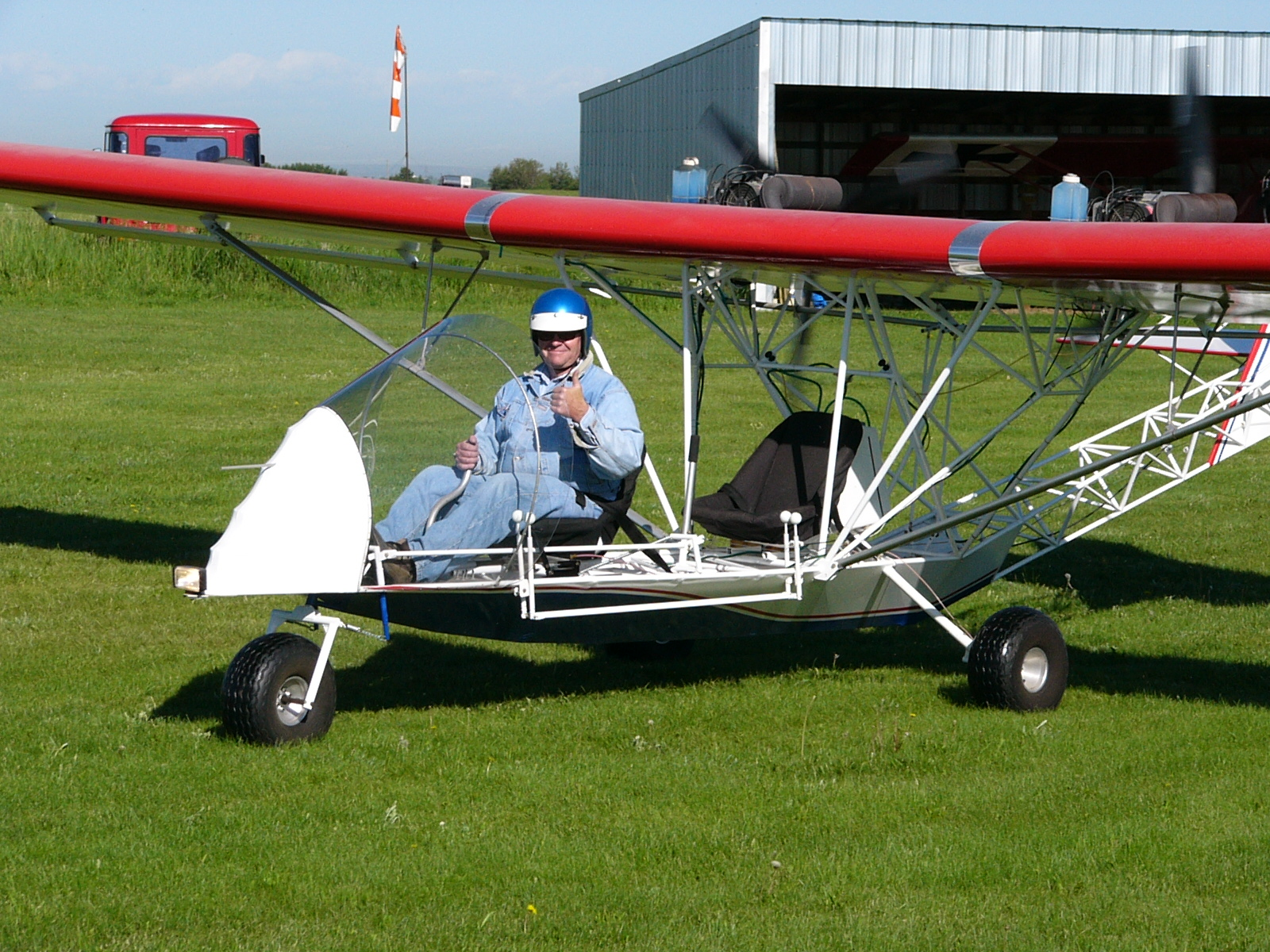
The holder of a Canadian ultra-light pilot permit prepares to fly a Blue Yonder Twin Engine EZ Flyer.

The ultra-light pilot permit allows the holder to fly an ultra-light aircraft in accordance with day VFR. A passenger may not be carried without a passenger carrying endorsement.

The ultra-light pilot permit is endorsed with a blanket type rating for all models of ultra-light aeroplanes. Transport Canada defines two general categories of ultra-light aeroplane. The operating and flight rules for basic ultra-light aeroplanes (BULA) does not allow any passenger carrying. The advanced ultra-light aeroplane (AULA) has stricter design requirements and includes passenger carrying if the pilot has an ultra-light pilot permit endorsed with the Passenger-carrying—ultra-light aeroplane rating. Holders of this permit may also fly certified or homebuilt aeroplanes that meet the weight and stall speed requirements of an ultra-light aeroplane.

Aircraft other than aeroplanes also fall under the general classification of ultra-light, in particular powered parachutes and powered paragliders. In such cases, the ultra-light pilot permit is restricted to the type used by the student for training and qualification.

Ultra-light aeroplanes are often equipped with floats, amphibious floats or designed as a seaplane, however, there is no seaplane rating for the ultra-light pilot permit. Any ultra-light pilot may operate on water within the regulations of the CARs and the capabilities of the ultra-light aeroplane used.

=== Recreational pilot permit—aeroplane ===
The recreational pilot permit—aeroplane is designed to make flying more affordable. It has fewer requirements with respect to training and affords more restrictive privileges compared to the private pilot licence—aeroplane.

This permit allows a person to fly as pilot of an aeroplane. Either the landplane or seaplane aeroplane class rating is included, depending on which type of aeroplane is used in the training for this permit and the appropriate rating is issued with the recreational pilot permit—aeroplane. This permit can be endorsed with either the seaplane or landplane class rating. Only domestic day flying in a single engine, non-high-performance aeroplane under VFR is allowed. This permit is restricted to single engine aeroplanes designed for a maximum of four people, but with only one passenger.

A pilot with this permit may also act as pilot of an ultra-light aeroplane.

=== Recreational pilot permit—helicopter ===
The recreational pilot permit—helicopter was intended to make flying more accessible. It was to have fewer requirements with respect to training and would have afforded more restrictive privileges as compared to the private pilot licence—helicopter.

Due to concerns within Transport Canada about the safety of a 25-hour permit to fly helicopters, the standards to establish this permit were never instituted and the permit is therefore not currently available. Transport Canada has indicated a desire to rescind this permit from the CARs.

=== Glider pilot licence ===
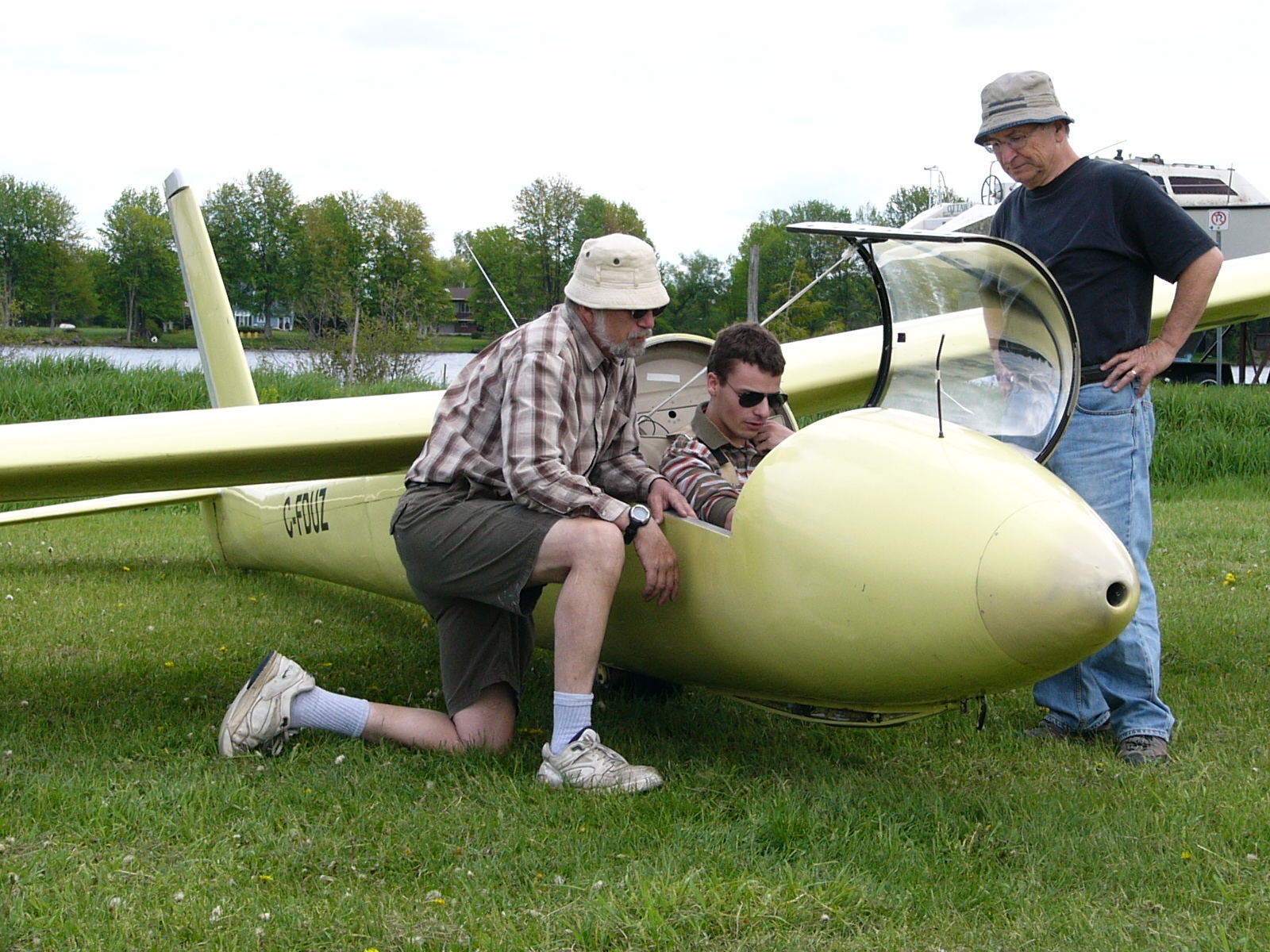
A Canadian glider pilot is ground briefed prior to solo in a Schweizer SGS 1-34 sailplane

The glider pilot licence allows the holder to fly as pilot of a glider, under day VFR.

The glider pilot licence is endorsed in the student's flight log by a flight test examiner or flight instructor for the type of launch method used during training. The licence is only valid for those methods of launch for which the glider pilot has been endorsed.

Once a glider pilot has completed a minimum of three solo flights using a particular launch method, they may then carry passengers, but only for those launch methods for which they have been endorsed and have completed the three solo flights.

=== Balloon pilot licence ===
The balloon pilot licence allows the holder to act as pilot co-pilot of a balloon. Only day flying under VFR is allowed, unless a night rating is added.

The balloon pilot licence is endorsed, in the student's flight log, by a flight test examiner or flight instructor for the type of inflation method used during training.

Once a balloon pilot has completed a minimum of three solo take-offs, accumulated a minimum of 50 hours flight time in untethered balloons and 300 hours total balloon flight time, his licence may then be further endorsed for take-offs in built-up areas.

=== Private pilot licence—aeroplane ===
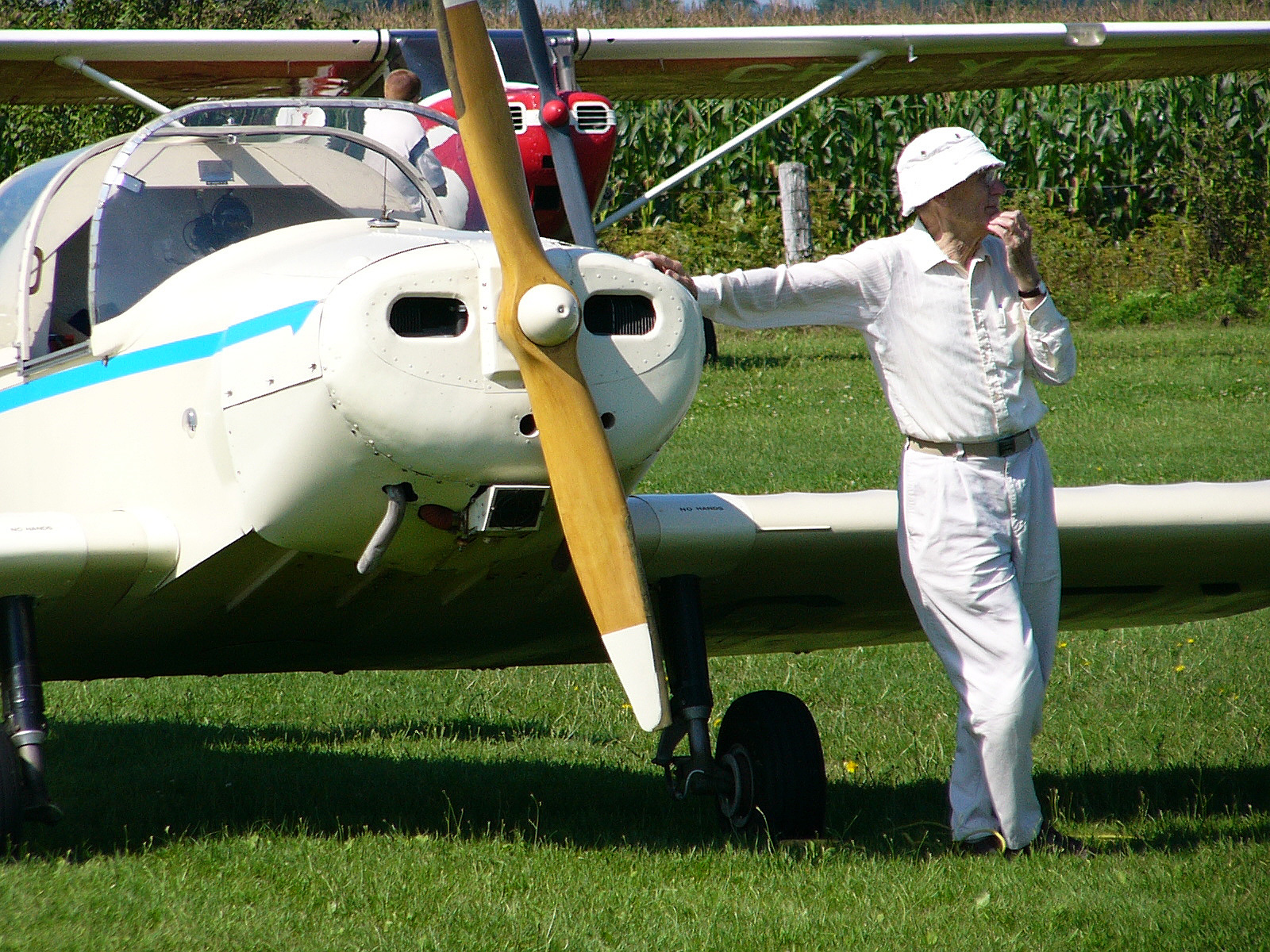
A Canadian private pilot with his Jodel D11-2.

The private pilot licence—aeroplane allows the holder to fly as pilot or co-pilot of an aeroplane. This is the most commonly held licence in Canada and is the first licence earned by an aspiring professional pilot. Usually, the landplane aeroplane class rating is included in the training for this licence and this rating is issued with the private pilot licence—aeroplane. Only day flying of a single engine non-high-performance aeroplane in accordance with VFR is allowed, unless other ratings have been obtained.

A pilot with this licence cannot work for "hire or reward", although reimbursement for some costs such as fuel is permitted.

A pilot with this licence may also act as a pilot of an ultra-light aeroplane.

The following ratings can be added:

- Seaplane rating
- Multi-engine rating
- Multi-engine centre line thrust rating
- Night rating
- VFR-Over-the-Top rating
- Instrument rating

=== Private pilot licence—helicopter ===
The private pilot licence—helicopter licence allows the holder to fly as pilot or co-pilot of a helicopter. Only day flying under VFR is allowed until other ratings are added.

There is no blanket type rating for helicopter aircraft types and a type rating must be earned for each type of helicopter. A helicopter type rating for the specific helicopter used during training is issued with the private pilot licence—helicopter.

A pilot with this licence cannot work for hire, although reimbursement for some costs is permitted.

The following endorsements can be added:

- Individual type rating for each model of helicopter
- Night rating
- VFR-Over-the-Top rating
- Instrument rating

=== Commercial pilot licence—aeroplane ===
The commercial pilot licence—aeroplane licence allows the holder to fly professionally as pilot of a single pilot aeroplane, or as copilot on a multi-crew aeroplane.

The commercial pilot licence—aeroplane includes more advanced piloting knowledge, skill and experience than the private pilot licence—aeroplane. A private pilot licence—aeroplane is a prerequisite to earning a commercial pilot licence—aeroplane. A commercial pilot licence—aeroplane is in turn a prerequisite to earning an airline transport pilot licence—aeroplane or any class of flight instructor—aeroplane rating. The privileges of the ultra-light pilot permit, private pilot licence—aeroplane, and VFR-Over-the-Top rating and night flying are included in this licence.

The following endorsements can be added:

- Landplane rating
- Seaplane rating
- Multi-engine rating
- Multi-engine centre line thrust rating
- Instrument rating
- Second officer rating
- Flight instructor rating

=== Commercial pilot licence—helicopter ===
The commercial pilot licence—helicopter licence allows the holder to fly professionally as pilot of a single pilot helicopter or as copilot of a multi-crew helicopter.

The commercial pilot licence—helicopter involves more advanced piloting knowledge, skill and experience than the private pilot licence—helicopter. A private pilot licence—helicopter is not a prerequisite to earning a commercial pilot licence—helicopter, however, the requirements for knowledge and experience are greater. A commercial pilot licence—helicopter is a prerequisite to earning an airline transport pilot licence—helicopter or any class of flight instructor—helicopter rating. The privileges of the private pilot licence—helicopter are included in this licence.

The commercial pilot licence—helicopter is restricted to daylight unless endorsed for night flying. The CARs provide for a number of significant options for credit in terms of knowledge and experience for pilots with previous experience flying with other permits and licences.

The following endorsements can be added:

- Night
- Instrument rating
- Flight instructor rating

=== Airline transport pilot licence—aeroplane ===
The airline transport pilot licence—aeroplane allows the holder to fly professionally as pilot or co-pilot of a single pilot or multi-crew aeroplane. This licence is required in order to be a professional airline captain.

The airline transport pilot licence—aeroplane involves more advanced piloting knowledge, skill and experience than the commercial pilot licence—aeroplane. A commercial pilot licence—aeroplane, multi-engine rating and a Group 1 instrument rating are prerequisites for the airline transport pilot licence—aeroplane. The privileges of the ultra-light pilot permit, private pilot licence—aeroplane and commercial pilot licence—aeroplane are included.

The following endorsements can be added:

- Second officer rating
- Flight instructor rating

=== Airline transport pilot licence—helicopter ===
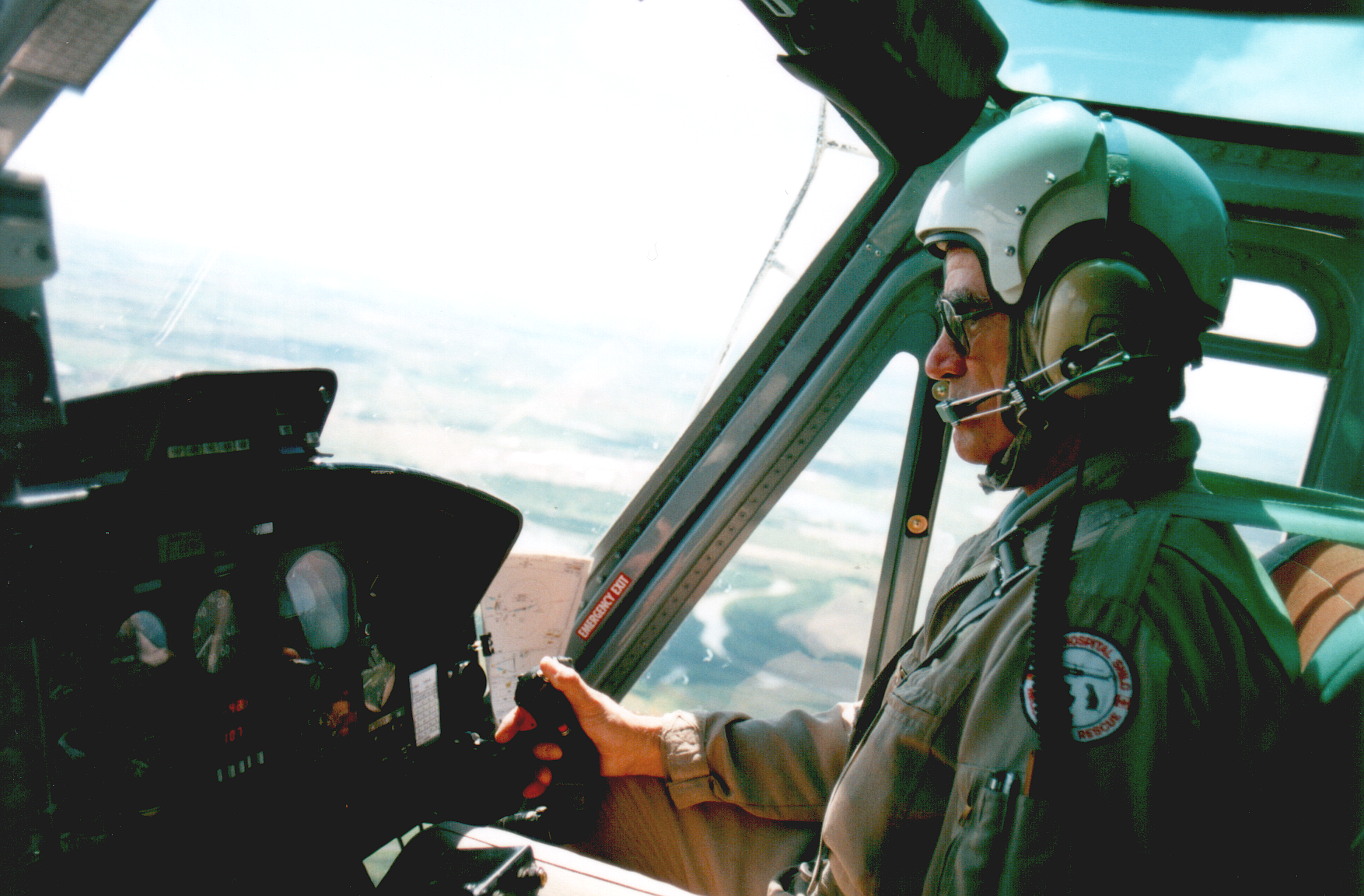
A Canadian pilot who holds an Airline Transport Pilot Licence - Helicopter, flying a Bell 212 on a medevac mission.

The airline transport pilot licence—helicopter allows a pilot to fly professionally as pilot or co-pilot of single pilot or multi-crew helicopters.

The airline transport pilot licence—helicopter involves more advanced piloting knowledge, skill and experience than the commercial pilot licence—helicopter. A commercial pilot licence—helicopter is a prerequisite to the airline transport pilot licence—helicopter. The privileges of the private pilot licence—helicopter and commercial pilot licence—helicopter are included.

The airline transport pilot licence—helicopter is restricted to aerial work only if the night and instrument flight time requirements are not met. This means that the licence is restricted to commercial flying that does not include air transport (transportation of commercial passengers) nor flight training.

The following endorsement can be added:

- Flight instructor rating

=== Flight engineer licence ===
Some airliners are flown by a third crew member in addition to the pilot and co-pilot, a flight engineer. The flight engineer is responsible for monitoring aircraft systems in flight and for inspecting the aircraft before and after each flight. The Boeing 747-300 is an example of an airliner that employs a flight engineer. Recent airliners from manufacturers such as Boeing and Airbus are designed for a two pilot crew with flight management functions previously the responsibility of a flight engineer now handled by automation. Many older airliners flying require a flight engineer.

The flight engineer licence allows the holder to be an aeroplane flight engineer. Generally, this will be on a large transport aircraft. Being a pilot is not a prerequisite to earning a flight engineer licence, though many flight engineers do hold a commercial pilot licence—aeroplane or airline transport pilot licence.

There is no blanket aircraft type rating associated with the flight engineer licence. The licence must be endorsed with an individual type rating for each aeroplane type. When issued the flight engineer rating for the aeroplane type used by a person for training is issued.

The following endorsements can be added:

- Flight engineer rating

=== UAV licensing ===
Pilots of unmanned aerial vehicles (UAV) weighing between 250 g (0.55 pounds) and 25 kg (55 pounds) must possess either a Pilot Certificate - Basic Operations or a Pilot Certificate - Advanced Operations. While either class may be used to fly as a commercial drone pilot, only the advanced certification allows for flight within controlled airspace (with prior approval from Nav Canada) and within 100 feet (30 metres) of bystanders. Visual flight rules are observed by both classes, with a Special Flight Operations Certificate (SFOC) with a "BVLOS" (beyond visual line of sight) endorsement being required to fly beyond visual line of sight.

Special Flight Operations Certificates may be applied for by UAV pilots who wish to fly under circumstances outside of CARs rules for basic and advanced operations.

== Ratings ==
=== Aeroplane class ratings ===
Aeroplane class ratings are specific to fixed-wing aircraft. These include:

- Seaplane rating
- Landplane rating
- Multi-engine rating
- Multi-engine centre line thrust rating

=== Aircraft type ratings ===
Aeroplane licences may be endorsed with individual aircraft types or with blanket ratings for groups of aircraft, for instance "All aeroplanes with a minimum flight crew requirement of one pilot excluding high performance".

Other blanket type ratings available for the respective licence or permit include:

- Gliders
- Balloons
- Ultra-light aeroplanes
- Gyroplanes

Individual aircraft type ratings required for the respective licence or permit include:

- Each aeroplane with a minimum flight crew requirement of at least two pilots
- Each aeroplane with a minimum flight crew requirement of at least two pilots utilizing a cruise relief pilot
- Each high performance Aeroplane type to be endorsed on a pilot licence - aeroplane category
- Each aeroplane type to be endorsed on a flight engineer licence
- Each aeroplane type to be endorsed on a second officer rating
- Each aeroplane type to be endorsed on a licence for which no blanket type rating is issued
- Each type of helicopter
- Each type of power driven balloon or airship
- Each type of gyroplane other than single seat gyroplanes
- Restricted Licence - Individual aircraft type ratings for certain medically restricted licences

=== Night rating ===
The night rating allows a pilot to fly in VMC and navigate in visual reference to the ground, at night. This is different from instrument meteorological conditions (IMC) where the pilot flies and maintains situational awareness strictly by using instruments and avionics.

The night rating is available only for the following permits and licences:

- Gyroplane pilot permit
- Balloon pilot licence
- Private pilot licence—aeroplane
- Private pilot licence—helicopter

For the commercial and airline pilot licences (aeroplane) it is expected that the night rating will have already been earned. If not, a restricted licence may be issued for day flying only.

=== VFR-Over-the-Top rating ===
The VFR-Over-the-Top (VFR OTT) rating allows the holder to fly above and between cloud, without visual reference to the ground under visual flight rules during the daytime. Pilots are required to take off from an aerodrome in normal VMC and VFR and land at the destination aerodrome under VFR. The cruise flight in between may be flown under VFR OTT flight rules.

This rating is an intermediate step between piloting privileges that allow only for VFR flying and an instrument rating. This rating is included in the privileges of an instrument rating, as well as the Commercial Licence.

The VFR OTT rating is available for the following licences:

- Private pilot—aeroplane
- Private pilot—helicopter
- Commercial pilot—helicopter
- Airline transport pilot—helicopter

=== Instrument rating ===
The instrument rating allows a pilot to fly in instrument meteorological conditions (IMC), for example when cloud layers obscure the pilot's view of the ground. An instrument-rated pilot is able to fly and maintain situational awareness strictly by using instruments and avionics. This rating is one of the more complex ratings and is a major step toward earning more advanced licences such as an airline transport pilot licence—aeroplane. It can be added to any aeroplane or helicopter licence and is a requirement for the issue of an Airline Transport Pilot Licence - Aeroplanes.

The rating may only be exercised for aircraft in the group endorsed. An instrument rating is often combined with other ratings to form a set of piloting privileges. For example, the multi-engine rating is required in addition to an instrument rating to fly a multi-engined aircraft under instrument flight rules.

VFR-Over-the-Top privileges are included in an instrument rating.

The requirements for an instrument rating are the same for both a private pilot licence—aeroplane and a private pilot licence—helicopter. Helicopters certified for IFR operations are generally complex multi-crew and multi-engine aircraft, so a helicopter instrument rating is generally issued in conjunction with other ratings.

Transport Canada issues distinct instrument ratings for each of the following four groups of aircraft types dependent upon the nature of the training for the instrument rating and the associated flight test.

- Group 1 for multi-engine aeroplanes
- Group 2 for multi-engine centre line thrust aeroplanes
- Group 3 for single engine aeroplanes
- Group 4 for helicopters

=== Second officer rating ===
The second officer rating can be added to the professional aeroplane licences to allow the holder to act as second officer on a multi-crew aircraft. By itself the rating does not confer piloting privileges.

The second officer rating is available only for the following licences:

- Commercial pilot licence—aeroplane
- Airline transport pilot licence—aeroplane

=== Passenger-carrying—ultra-light aeroplane rating ===
Transport Canada defines two general types of ultra-light aeroplane, basic ultra-light aeroplanes are not allowed to carry passengers, while advanced ultra-light aeroplanes are allowed to carry one passenger, if the pilot has an ultra-light pilot permit endorsed with this rating.

The passenger-carrying—ultra-light aeroplane rating applies only to the ultra-light pilot permit. Pilots with a recreational pilot permit—aeroplane and higher aeroplane licences are allowed to carry passengers in an aircraft that is authorized for passenger-carrying.

=== Aerobatic rating ===
There is no aerobatic rating for pilots to carry out aerobatics in Canada, although there are ratings for instructors to teach students aerobatics on aeroplanes and gliders. Prior to carrying passengers for the purpose of conducting aerobatics, pilots must first learn to fly aerobatic maneuvers. Pilots in Canada may learn aerobatics in one of two ways: pilots may spend 20 hours of flight time learning aerobatics on their own or pilots may fly 10 hours with a licensed Class 1 or Class 2 Aerobatic Instructor.

=== Flight instructor ratings ===
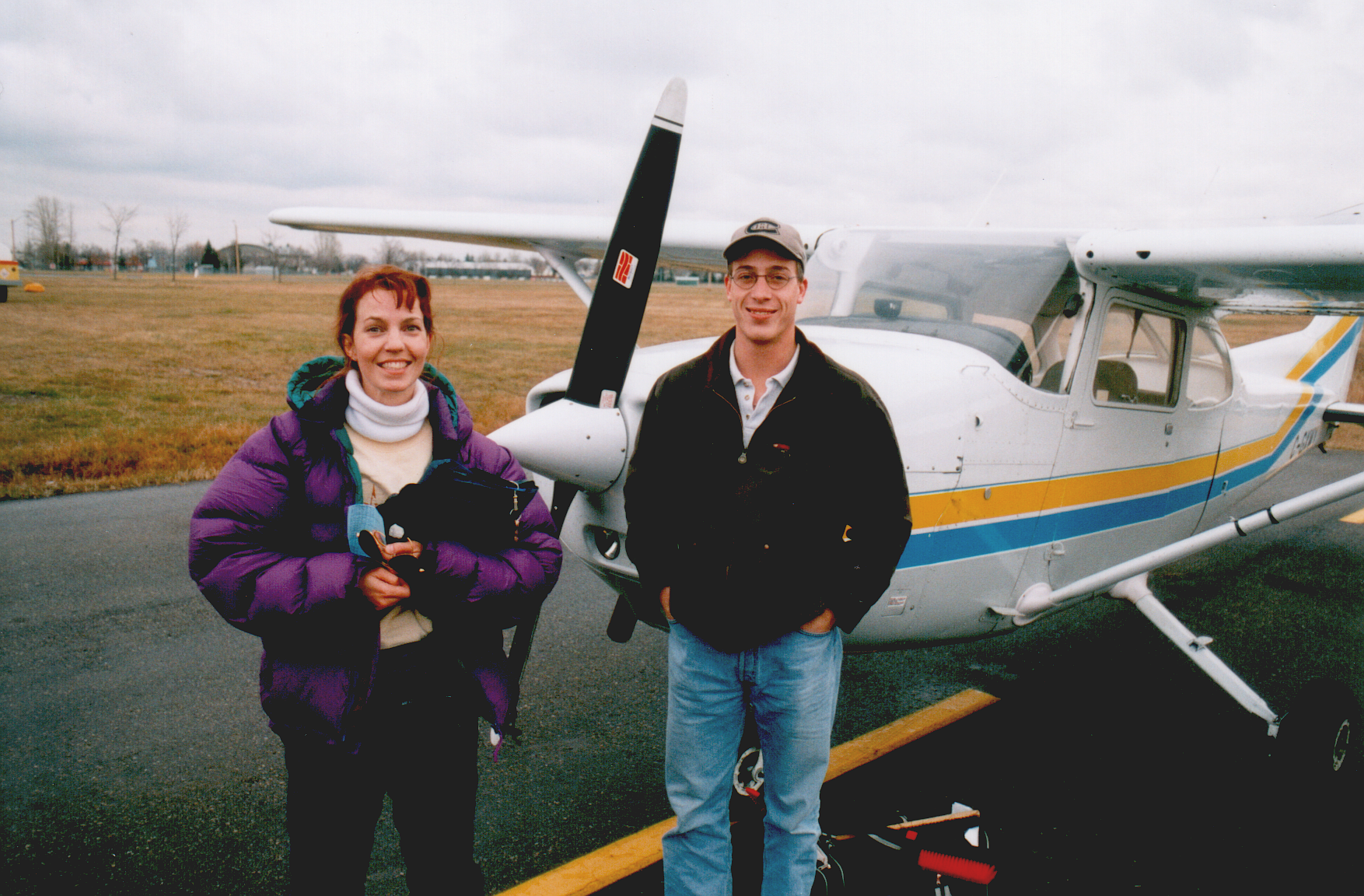
A Canadian aeroplane flight instructor (left) and her student, with the Cessna 172 they have just completed a lesson in.

The following flight instructor ratings are available to be added to the applicable licence or permit:

- Aeroplane instructor rating - Class 1, 2, 3 or 4
- Aeroplane aerobatic instructor rating - Class 1 or 2
- Helicopter instructor rating - Class 1, 2, 3 or 4
- Gyroplane instructor rating
- Glider instructor rating
- Glider aerobatic instructor rating
- Balloon instructor rating
- Ultra-light Aeroplane instructor rating

== Foreign licence conversion ==
As of 1 December 2006 Canadian pilots who hold certain pilot licences are able to convert those licences into FAA Certificates with greater ease than in the past. Similarly, American pilots who hold certain pilot certificates are able to convert those certificates into Canadian licences.

== See also ==
- Pilot licensing in the United Kingdom
- Pilot certification in the United States
- Pilot licensing and certification
