= Canadian Council =

Canadian Council may refer to:

In aviation:

- Canadian Airports Council, the Canadian trade association for Canada's airports
- Canadian Aviation Regulation Advisory Council, a public consultative body involved in creating the Canadian Aviation Regulations

In other fields:

- Canadian Broadcast Standards Council, an independent organization created by the Canadian Association of Broadcasters
- Canadian Council for Geographic Education, an initiative of The Royal Canadian Geographical Society and the National Geographic Society
- Canadian Council for Tobacco Control, a registered Canadian charity
- Canadian Council of Churches, an ecumenical Christian forum of churches in Canada
- Canadian Council of Natural Mothers, a Canadian lobby group for the rights of women who have placed children for adoption
- Canadian Council of Professional Engineers, the national organization of 12 provincial and territorial associations
- Canadian Judicial Council, the regulating body for Canadian judges composed mostly of chief justices and associate chief justices
- Canadian Meat Council, Canada's national trade association for the federally inspected red meat packers and processors
- Canadian Translators, Terminologists and Interpreters Council, a federation of provincial and territorial associations
- Canadian Unitarian Council, the national body for Unitarian Universalists in Canada
- Canadian Unity Council, a non-profit organization whose mission is the promotion of Canadian Unity and the current federal institutions
- Chinese Canadian National Council, an organization whose purpose is to monitor racial discrimination against Chinese in Canada

== See also ==
- Canada Council
