= Manitoba Aviation Council =

Canadian aviation advocacy agency

- Formation: February 1959; 67 years ago
- Type: Nonprofit
- Purpose: Aviation advocacy
- Headquarters: Winnipeg
- Members: 250
- Website: mbaviation.ca

The Manitoba Aviation Council (MAC) is an association whose mandate states: to promote, facilitate, and protect the development of all facets of aviation in Manitoba, Canada.

== Role ==
MAC also works with the Northern Air Transport Association and the Northwest Ontario airports and air carrier groups, as well as cooperating with the national aviation associations. Like the aviation industries in British Columbia, Alberta and Saskatchewan, all the western Canada provinces have active councils that have provided many benefits to their aviation communities.

While respecting the particular interests of other aviation-related organizations in Manitoba, the Council strives to serve as an "umbrella group" to represent all groups, as well as interested individuals and businesses in specific aviation matters.

== History ==
The Manitoba Aviation Council was founded in February, 1959. Konrad Johanneson was the first chair and, under him, Bob Danaher, Nick Froebe, J. Sparks and G. Forsythe formed the rest of that first council.

== Present day ==
Today, MAC's membership database numbers more than 250. MAC keeps its members informed about aviation issues from local to global concerns through a monthly electronic newsletter, the Western Canada Aviation & Aerospace trade journal and other means.

== See also ==
- Canadian Airports Council
- Canadian Owners and Pilots Association
