= Karatoo =

Karatoo may refer to:

- Anglin J6 Karatoo, an Australian ultralight aircraft
- Norman Aviation J6 Karatoo, a derivative of the Anglin J6 Karatoo
