= Norman Aviation Nordic 8 Mini Explorer =

Canadian homebuilt light aircraft

Nordic 8 Mini Explorer

General information
- Type: Ultralight aircraft
- National origin: Canada
- Manufacturer: Norman Aviation
- Status: In production (2012)
- Number built: 4 (2011)

The Norman Aviation Nordic 8 Mini Explorer is a Canadian ultralight aircraft, designed and produced by Norman Aviation of Saint-Anselme, Quebec. The aircraft is supplied as a kit for amateur construction.

== Design and development ==
The Mini Explorer was derived from the larger Hubert de Chevigny designed Personal Explorer, adapted to Canadian Advanced Ultralight rules. It features a strut-braced high-wing, a two-seats-in-side-by-side configuration enclosed cockpit, fixed tricycle landing gear and a single engine in tractor configuration. The Mini Explorer is intended as a flying camper and so includes sufficient cabin space with couches for two adults to sleep and a kitchen. Due to the emphasis on fuselage volume the Mini Explorer is not a fast aircraft for its fitted power, with a cruise speed of about 85 mph (137 km/h).

The aircraft fuselage is made from welded steel tubing, with wooden structure wings and all surfaces covered in doped aircraft fabric. Its 36.1 ft (11.0 m) span wing has an area of 180.3 sq ft (16.75 m^{2}) and no flaps. The cabin width is 48 in (122 cm). Standard engines fitted are the 80 hp (60 kW) Rotax 912UL, the 100 hp (75 kW) Rotax 912ULS and the 115 hp (86 kW) Rotax 914 four-stroke turbocharged powerplant. Construction time from the supplied kit is estimated as 500 hours.

== Operational history ==
In December 2011 the company reported four examples had been completed. In February 2018 there were three Mini-Explorers on the Transport Canada Canadian Civil Aircraft Register, including the prototype.

== Specifications (Mini Explorer) ==
Data from Bayerl, Pilot Mix and Kitplanes

General characteristics

- Crew: one
- Capacity: one passenger
- Length: 6.4 m (21 ft)
- Wingspan: 11.0 m (36.1 ft)
- Wing area: 16.75 m^{2} (180.3 sq ft)
- Empty weight: 297 kg (654 lb)
- Gross weight: 559 kg (1,232 lb)
- Powerplant: 1 × Rotax 912ULS four cylinder, liquid and air-cooled, four stroke aircraft engine, 75 kW (101 hp)

Performance

- Maximum speed: 208 km/h (129 mph, 112 kn)
- Cruise speed: 137 km/h (85 mph, 74 kn)
- Stall speed: 60 km/h (37 mph, 32 kn)
- Never exceed speed: 210 km/h (130 mph, 110 kn)
- Rate of climb: 4.3 m/s (850 ft/min)
- Wing loading: 33.4 kg/m^{2} (6.8 lb/sq ft)
