= Norman Aviation Nordic II =

Canadian homebuilt light aircraft

Nordic II

General information
- Type: Ultralight aircraft
- National origin: Canada
- Manufacturer: Norman Aviation
- Designer: Jacques Norman
- Status: In production (2012)

History
- Manufactured: 1986-present
- First flight: 1986
- Developed from: Norman Aviation Nordic I

The Norman Aviation Nordic II is a Canadian advanced ultralight aircraft, designed by Jacques Norman and produced by Norman Aviation of Saint-Anselme, Quebec, first flying in 1986. The aircraft is supplied as a kit for amateur construction or as a complete ready-to-fly-aircraft and remained in production through 2012.

== Design and development ==
The Nordic II was designed to comply with the Canadian ultralight rules. It features a strut-braced high-wing, a two-seats-in-side-by-side configuration enclosed cockpit with doors, fixed conventional landing gear and a single engine in tractor configuration.

The aircraft fuselage is made from welded steel tubing, with its wings made from wood and all surfaces covered in doped aircraft fabric. Its 33 ft (10.1 m) span wing has an area of 154 sq ft (14.3 m^{2}) and mounts flaps. The wing is supported by V-struts and jury struts. The cockpit width is 39 in (99 cm). The standard engines used are the 64 hp (48 kW) Rotax 582 two-stroke, the 80 hp (60 kW) Rotax 912UL or 71 to 100 hp (53 to 75 kW) Subaru EA four-stroke powerplants.

Construction time from the factory supplied kit is estimated at 300 hours.

== Operational history ==
In February 2018 there were thirteen Nordic IIs on the Transport Canada Civil Aviation Register.

== Specifications (Nordic II) ==
Data from Purdy and Norman Aviation

General characteristics

- Crew: one
- Capacity: one passenger
- Length: 19 ft 0 in (5.79 m)
- Wingspan: 33 ft 0 in (10.06 m)
- Height: 5 ft 7 in (1.70 m)
- Wing area: 154 sq ft (14.3 m^{2})
- Empty weight: 620 lb (281 kg)
- Gross weight: 1,058 lb (480 kg)
- Fuel capacity: 12 U.S. gallons (45 L; 10.0 imp gal)
- Powerplant: 1 × Subaru EA engine four cylinder, air-cooled, four stroke automotive engine, 90 hp (67 kW)
- Propellers: 2-bladed composite

Performance

- Maximum speed: 100 mph (160 km/h, 87 kn)
- Cruise speed: 85 mph (137 km/h, 74 kn)
- Stall speed: 35 mph (56 km/h, 30 kn)
- Range: 350 mi (560 km, 300 nmi)
- Service ceiling: 10,000 ft (3,000 m)
- Rate of climb: 600 ft/min (3.0 m/s)
- Wing loading: 6.9 lb/sq ft (34 kg/m^{2})
