= Norman Aviation Nordic VI =

Canadian homebuilt light aircraft

Nordic VI
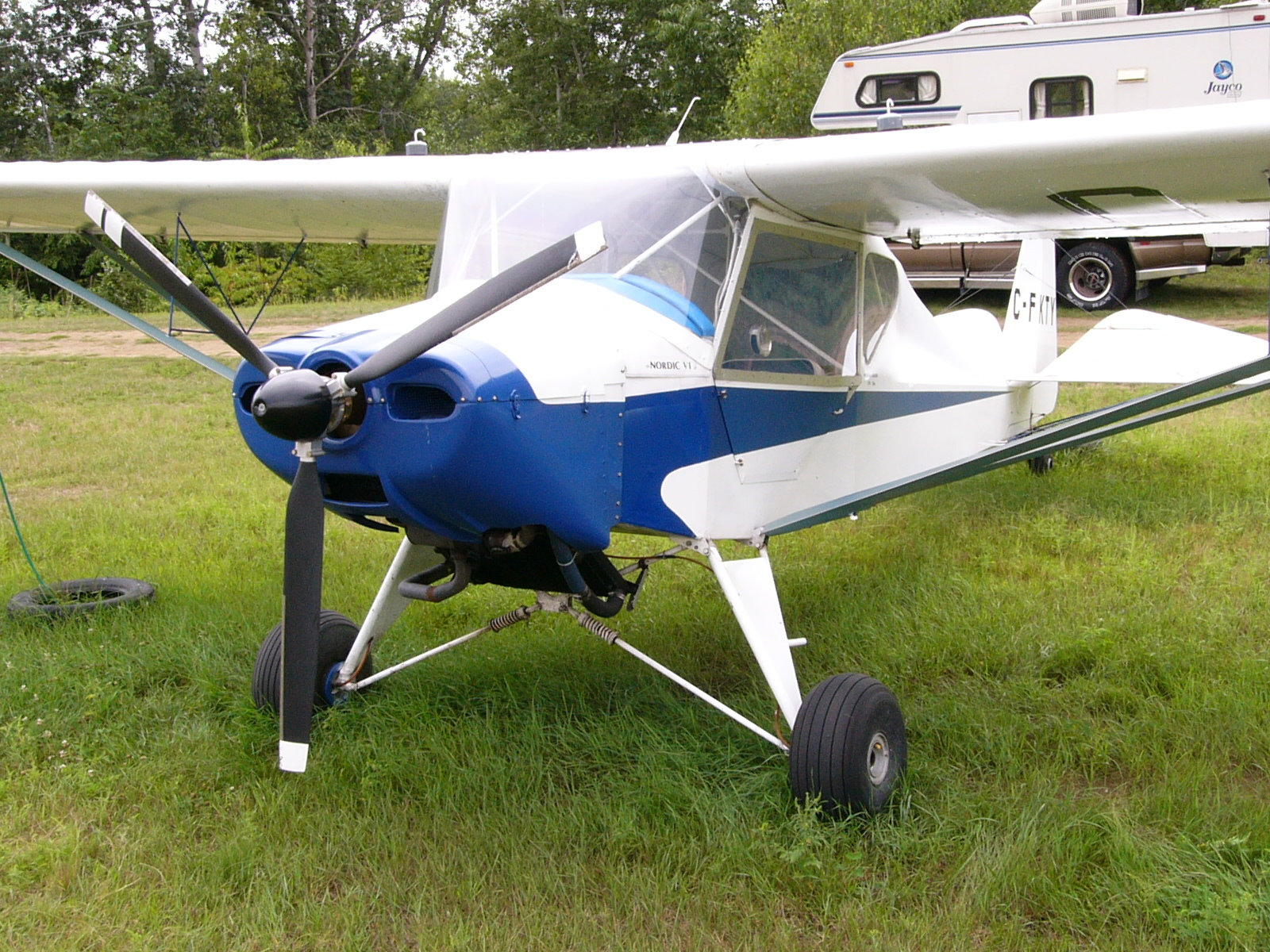

General information
- Type: Fixed-wing microlight
- National origin: Canada
- Manufacturer: Norman Aviation
- Designer: Jacques Norman
- Number built: 256 (2011)

The Norman Aviation Nordic VI is a Canadian fixed wing ultralight aircraft designed by Jacques Norman.

== Design ==
The Nordic VI is a high-wing braced cabin monoplane with side-by-side seating. It has a steel tube fuselage with fabric-covered wooden structure wings and a fixed tail wheel landing gear. The main landing gear legs are titanium.

== Variants ==
Nordic VI-912
Rotax 912 powered. 253 had been completed and flown by 2011.
Nordic VI-914
Rotax 914-powered. Three had been completed and flown by 2011.

== Operational history ==
In November 2016 there were 21 Nordic VIs on the Transport Canada Civil Aviation Register.

== Specifications ==
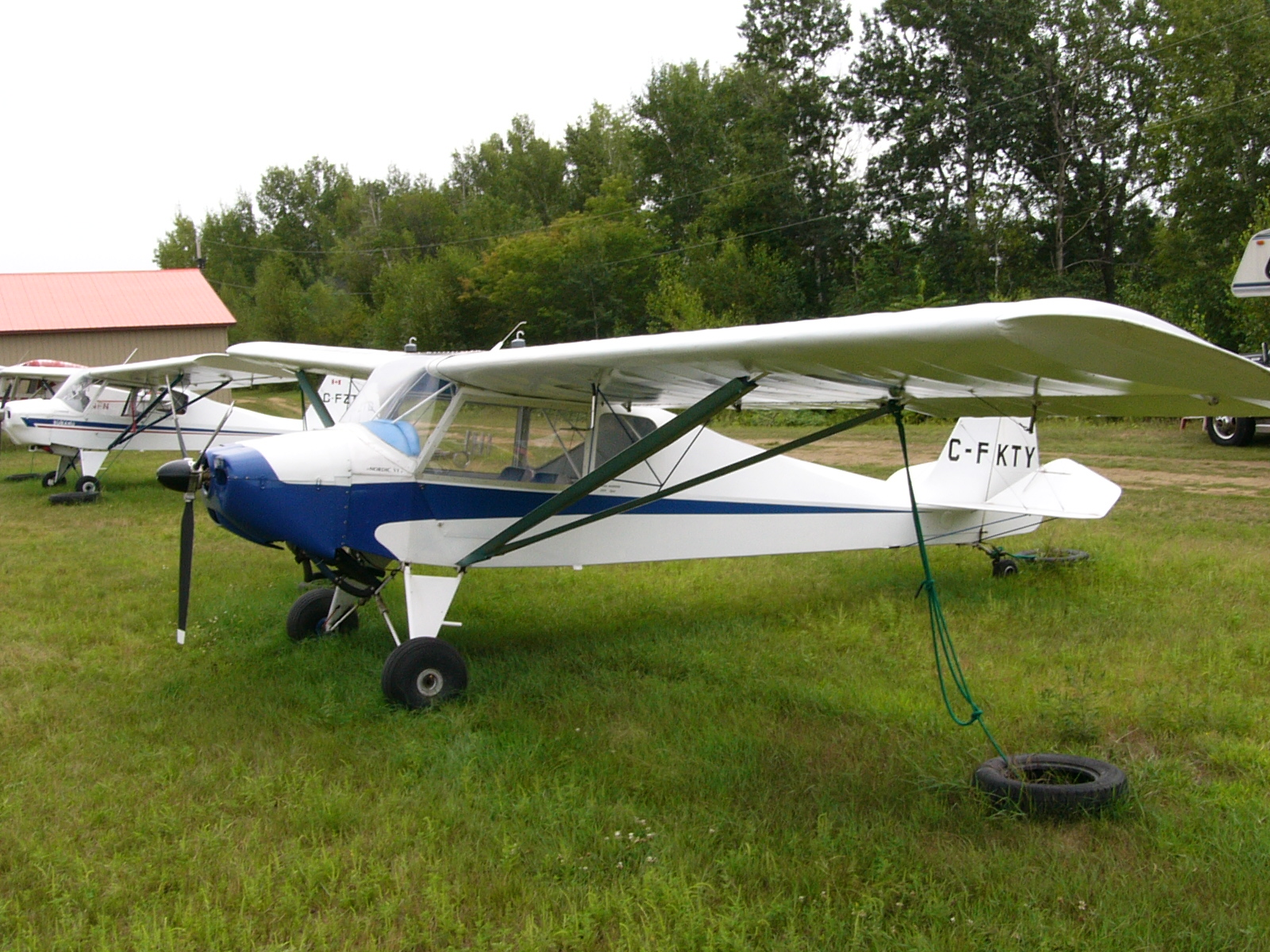
Norman Nordic VI

Data from World Directory of Leisure Aviation and Norman Aviation

General characteristics

- Crew: 2
- Length: 20 ft 2 in (6.15 m)
- Wingspan: 33 ft 6 in (10.21 m)
- Empty weight: 586 lb (266 kg)
- Gross weight: 1,058 lb (480 kg)
- Powerplant: 1 × Rotax 912 , 80 hp (60 kW)

Performance

- Cruise speed: 103 mph (166 km/h, 90 kn)
- Stall speed: 34 mph (55 km/h, 30 kn) at full flaps
- Service ceiling: 10,000 ft (3,000 m)
- Rate of climb: 980 ft/min (5 m/s)
