= PSTAR =

The PSTAR, originally standing for Pre-Solo Test of Air Regulations but now called Student Pilot Permit or Private Pilot Licence for Foreign and Military Applicants, Aviation Regulation Examination, is a written examination that a student studying for their Private Pilot Licence in Canada must pass before being awarded their Student Pilot Permit. All students must achieve a pass mark of 90% before commencing their first solo flight.

The exam is a multiple choice test of 50 questions covering the areas of;

- Canadian Aviation Regulations (CARs)
- Air traffic control Clearances and Instructions
- Air traffic control procedures as they apply to the control of VFR traffic at controlled airports
- Air traffic procedures at uncontrolled airports and aerodromes
- Special VFR Regulations
- Aeronautical Information Circulars
- NOTAM (Notice to Airmen)

The exam is administered by authorized flight training centres across Canada, or by Transport Canada regional offices.
