= Canadian Aviation Regulation Advisory Council =

Canadian public consultative body

The Canadian Aviation Regulation Advisory Council (CARAC) is the main public consultative body involved in creating and amending the Canadian Aviation Regulations and is a joint effort of Transport Canada and the Canadian aviation industry.

The Council holds one plenary meeting per year. The rest of the council's business is conducted through nine Technical Committees, the meetings of which are open to the public. The procedures used by CARAC are governed by the CARAC Management Charter. Technical Committees may also form Working Groups consisting of subject matter experts, to provide reports about areas that require detailed study.

The nine committees correspond to the eight main parts of the CARs, with Airworthiness being divided into two different Technical Committees.

- Part I CARAC Technical Committee - General Provisions
- Part II CARAC Technical Committee - Aircraft Identification and Registration and Operation of a Leased Aircraft by a Non-registered Owner
- Part III CARAC Technical Committee - Aerodromes and Airports
- Part IV CARAC Technical Committee - Personnel Licensing and Training
- Part V CARAC Technical Committee – Aircraft Certification
- Part V CARAC Technical Committee – Maintenance & Manufacturing
- Part VI CARAC Technical Committee - General Operating and Flight Rules
- Part VII CARAC Technical Committee - Commercial Air Services
- Part VIII CARAC Technical Committee - Air Navigation Services

Many Canadian aviation industry associations are regular participants in CARAC. These include the Air Transport Association of Canada, Canadian Airports Council, Canadian Business Aviation Association, Canadian Owners and Pilots Association and the National Airlines Council of Canada.

CARAC is strictly an advisory body and can only make recommendations to Transport Canada. The CARs decision-making body is the Civil Aviation Regulatory Committee (CARC), which consists solely of senior managers of Transport Canada.
