= Norman Aviation J6 Karatoo =

Canadian ultraight aircraft

J6 Karatoo
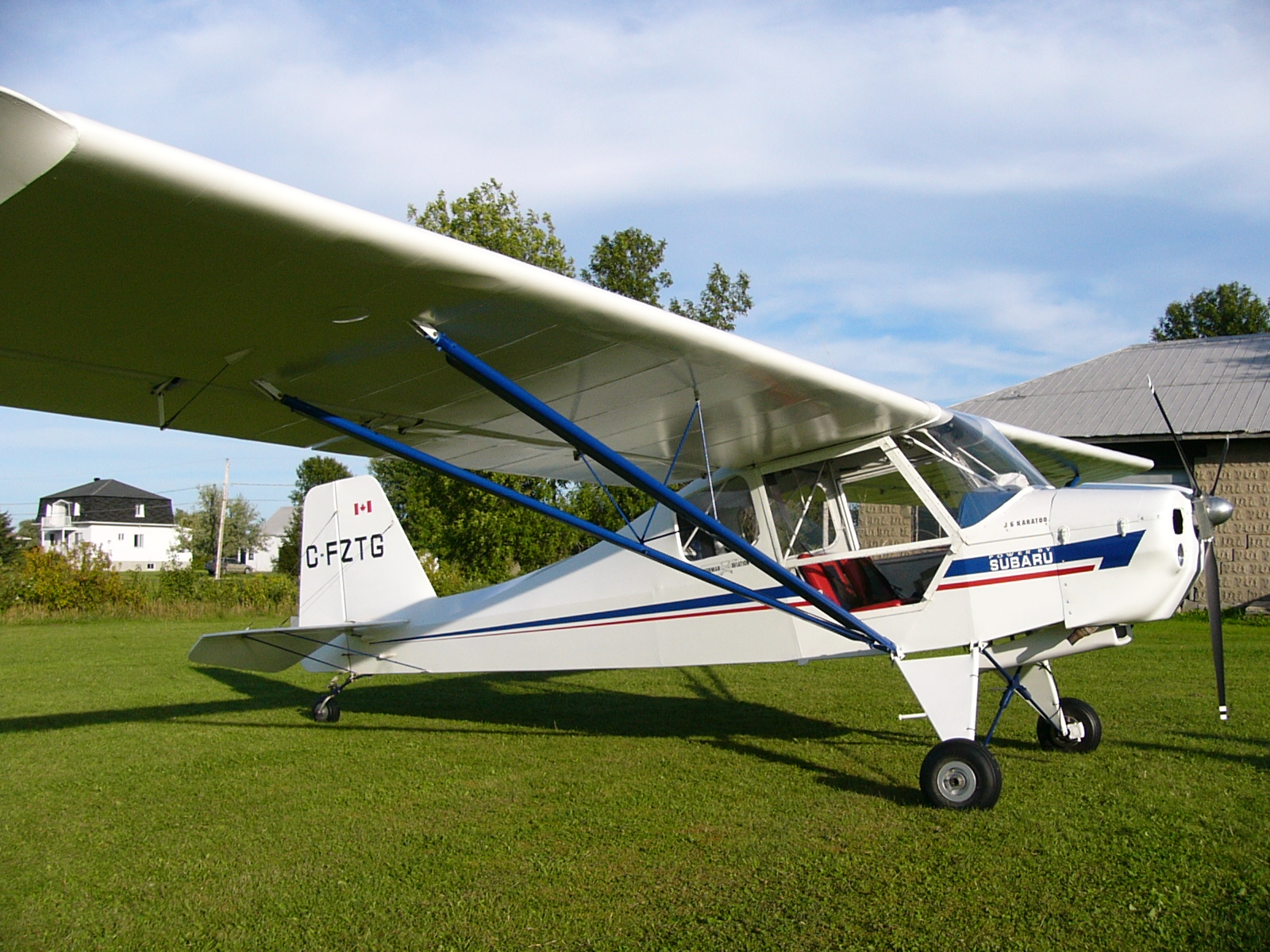

General information
- Type: Ultralight aircraft
- National origin: Canada
- Manufacturer: Norman Aviation
- Designer: Jesse Anglin
- Status: Production completed
- Number built: 75 (December 1998)

History
- First flight: 1988 (Norman Aviation version)
- Developed from: Anglin J6 Karatoo

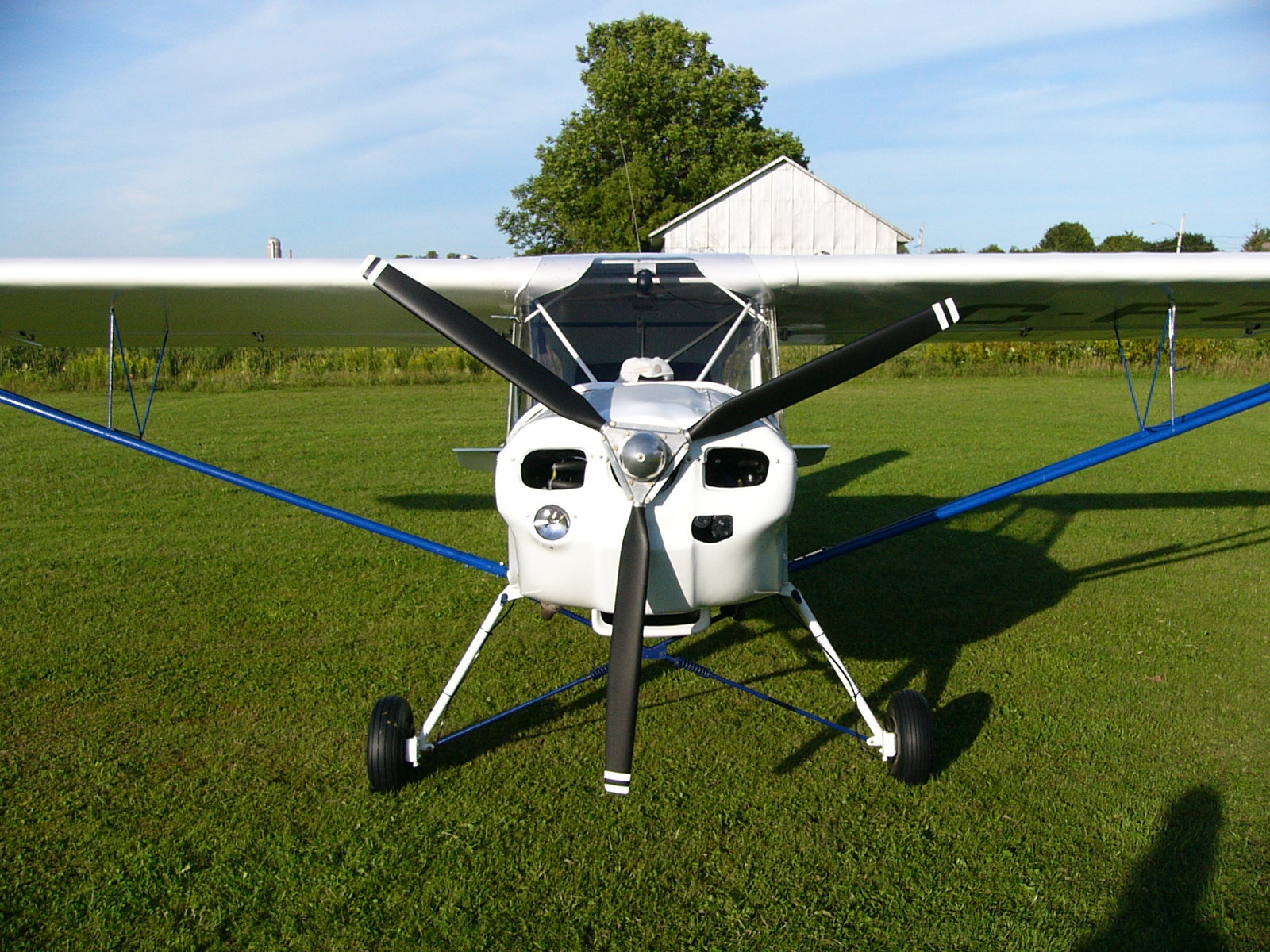
Norman Aviation J6 Karatoo

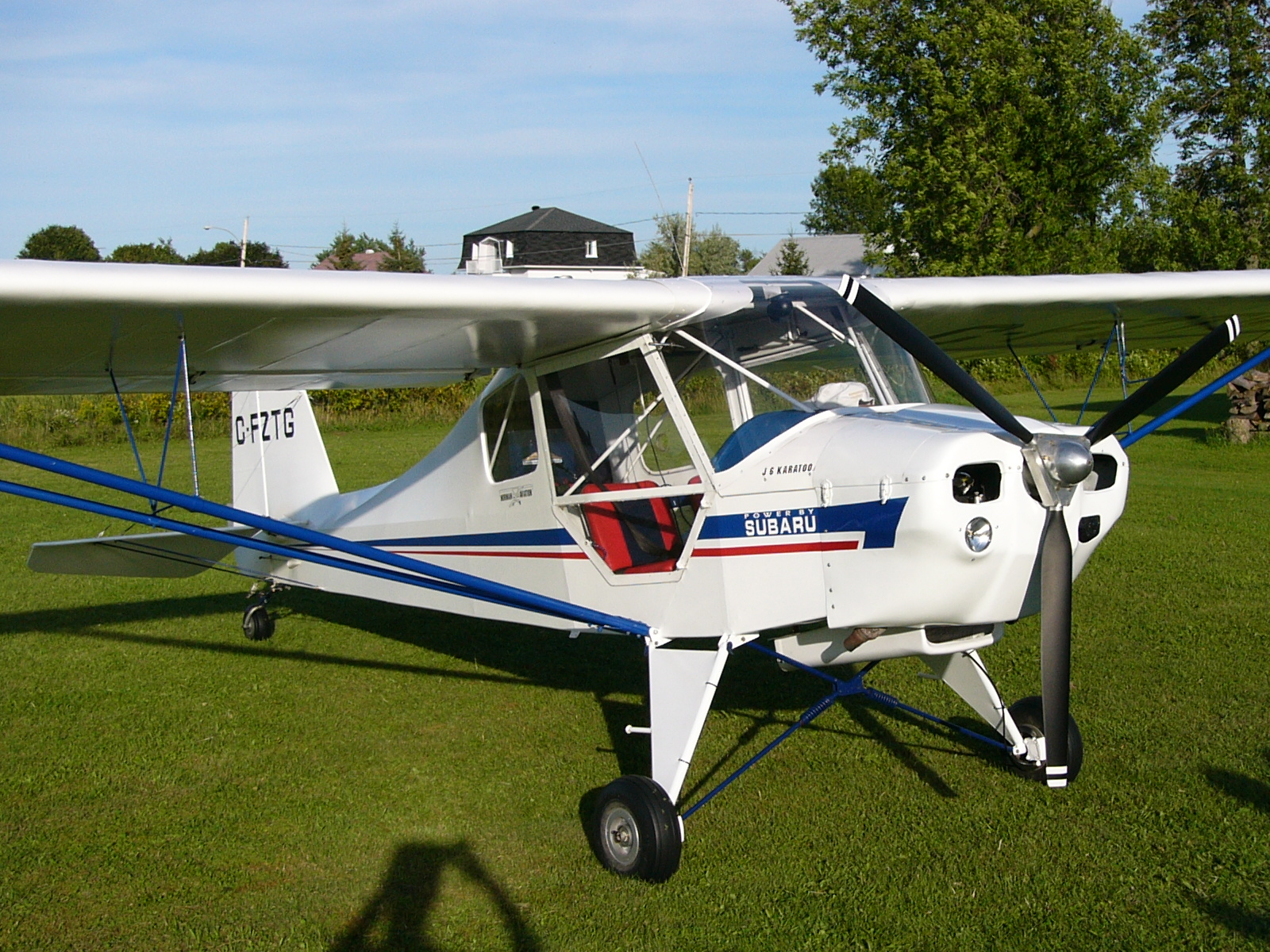
Norman Aviation J6 Karatoo

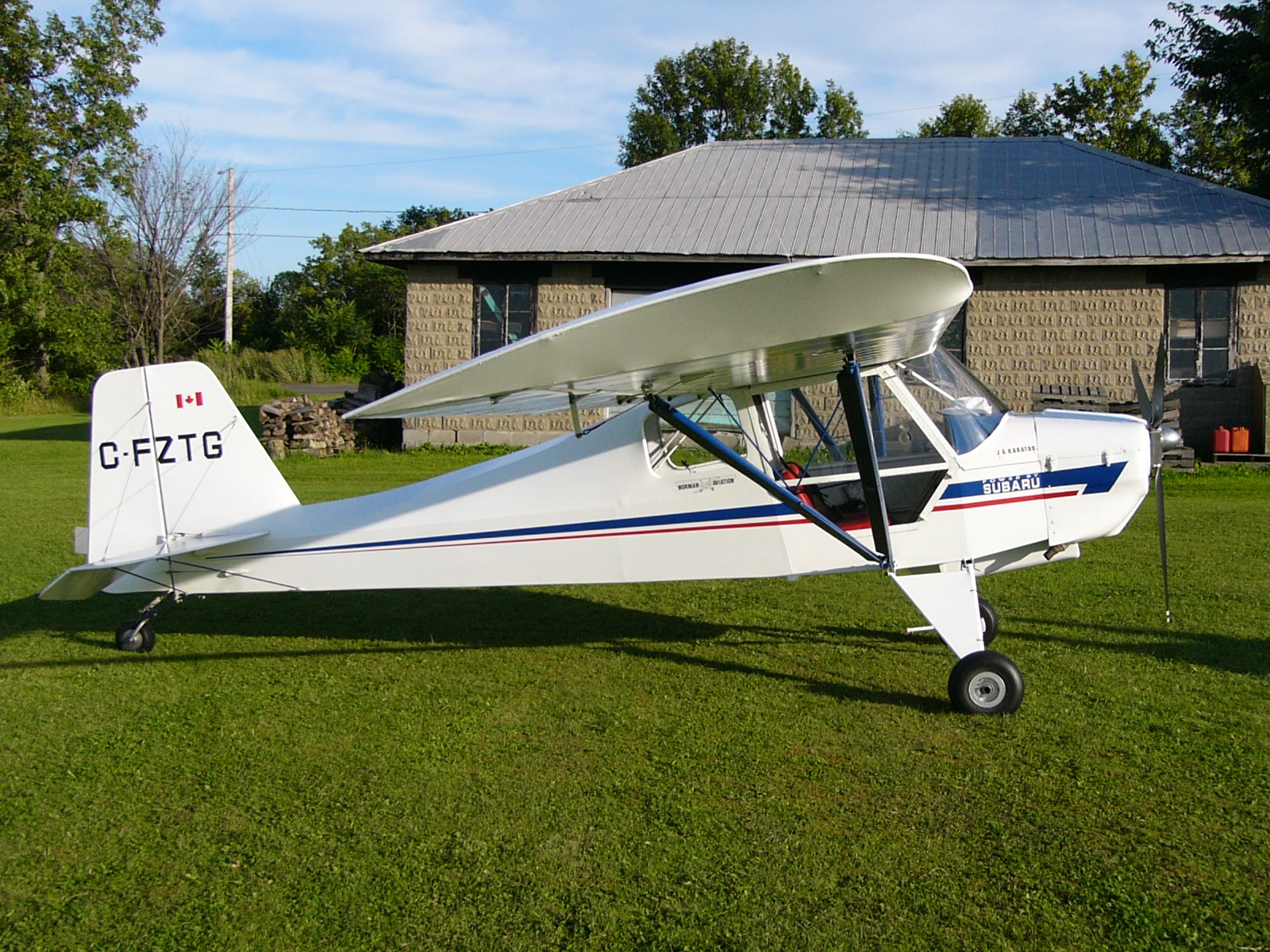
Norman Aviation J6 Karatoo

The Norman Aviation J6 Karatoo is a Canadian advanced ultralight aircraft, that was designed by Jesse Anglin, and produced by Norman Aviation of Saint-Anselme, Quebec. The aircraft was supplied as a kit for amateur construction, or as a complete ready-to-fly-aircraft.

Production is complete, and the J6 Karatoo is no longer available from Norman Aviation.

== Design and development ==
The Norman Aviation J6 Karatoo was a modified version of the original Anglin J6 Karatoo, designed to comply with the Canadian ultralight rules. It features a strut-braced high-wing, a two-seats-in-side-by-side configuration enclosed cockpit with doors, fixed conventional landing gear and a single engine in tractor configuration.

The aircraft fuselage is made from welded steel tubing, with its wings made from wood, and all surfaces covered in doped aircraft fabric. Its 33.0 ft (10.1 m) span wing has an area of 169 m^{2} (1,820 sq ft) and mounts flaps. The wing is supported by V-struts and jury struts. The standard engines used are the 64 hp (48 kW) Rotax 582 two-stroke, the 80 hp (60 kW) Rotax 912UL or 71 to 100 hp (53 to 75 kW) Subaru EA four-stroke powerplants.

Construction time from the factory supplied kit is estimated at 300 hours.

== Operational history ==
In February 2018 there were 12 Norman J6 Karatoos on the Transport Canada Civil Aviation Register.

== Specifications (J6 Karatoo) ==
Data from Purdy

General characteristics

- Crew: one
- Capacity: one passenger
- Length: 19 ft 0 in (5.79 m)
- Wingspan: 33 ft 0 in (10.06 m)
- Wing area: 169 sq ft (15.7 m^{2})
- Empty weight: 630 lb (286 kg)
- Gross weight: 1,058 lb (480 kg)
- Fuel capacity: 12 U.S. gallons (45 L; 10.0 imp gal)
- Powerplant: 1 × Subaru EA engine four cylinder, air-cooled, four stroke automotive engine, 90 hp (67 kW)
- Propellers: 2-bladed composite

Performance

- Maximum speed: 100 mph (160 km/h, 87 kn)
- Cruise speed: 90 mph (140 km/h, 78 kn)
- Stall speed: 38 mph (61 km/h, 33 kn)
- Range: 350 mi (560 km, 300 nmi)
- Service ceiling: 10,000 ft (3,000 m)
- Rate of climb: 650 ft/min (3.3 m/s)
- Wing loading: 6.3 lb/sq ft (31 kg/m^{2})

== See also ==
Related development

- Anglin J6 Karatoo

Aircraft of comparable role, configuration, and era

- Hipp's Superbirds J-3 Kitten
- Preceptor N3 Pup
- Belite Ultra Cub
- Ultravia Pelican
- Rocky Mountain Wings Ridge Runner
- Team Mini-Max Hi-MAX
- Fisher FP-202 Koala
- Light Miniature Aircraft LM-1
- Wood Sky Pup
