= Norman Aviation =

Canadian aircraft manufacturer

Norman Aviation International Inc.
- Company type: Private company
- Industry: Aerospace
- Founder: Jacques Norman
- Headquarters: Saint-Anselme, Quebec, Canada
- Key people: Owner: Jacques Norman
- Products: Ultralight aircraft
- Website: www3.sympatico.ca/sebastien.carron/anglaisversion.htm

Norman Aviation is a Canadian aircraft manufacturer originally based in Lévis, Quebec and now in Saint-Anselme, Quebec. The company specializes in the design and manufacture of steel tube and wood ultralight aircraft on a custom basis.

The company was founded by and is currently owned by Jacques Norman, to produce his designs and those of other designers. All his aircraft utilize 4130 steel tube fuselage construction and wooden wings, with the whole aircraft covered in doped aircraft fabric.

== Aircraft ==
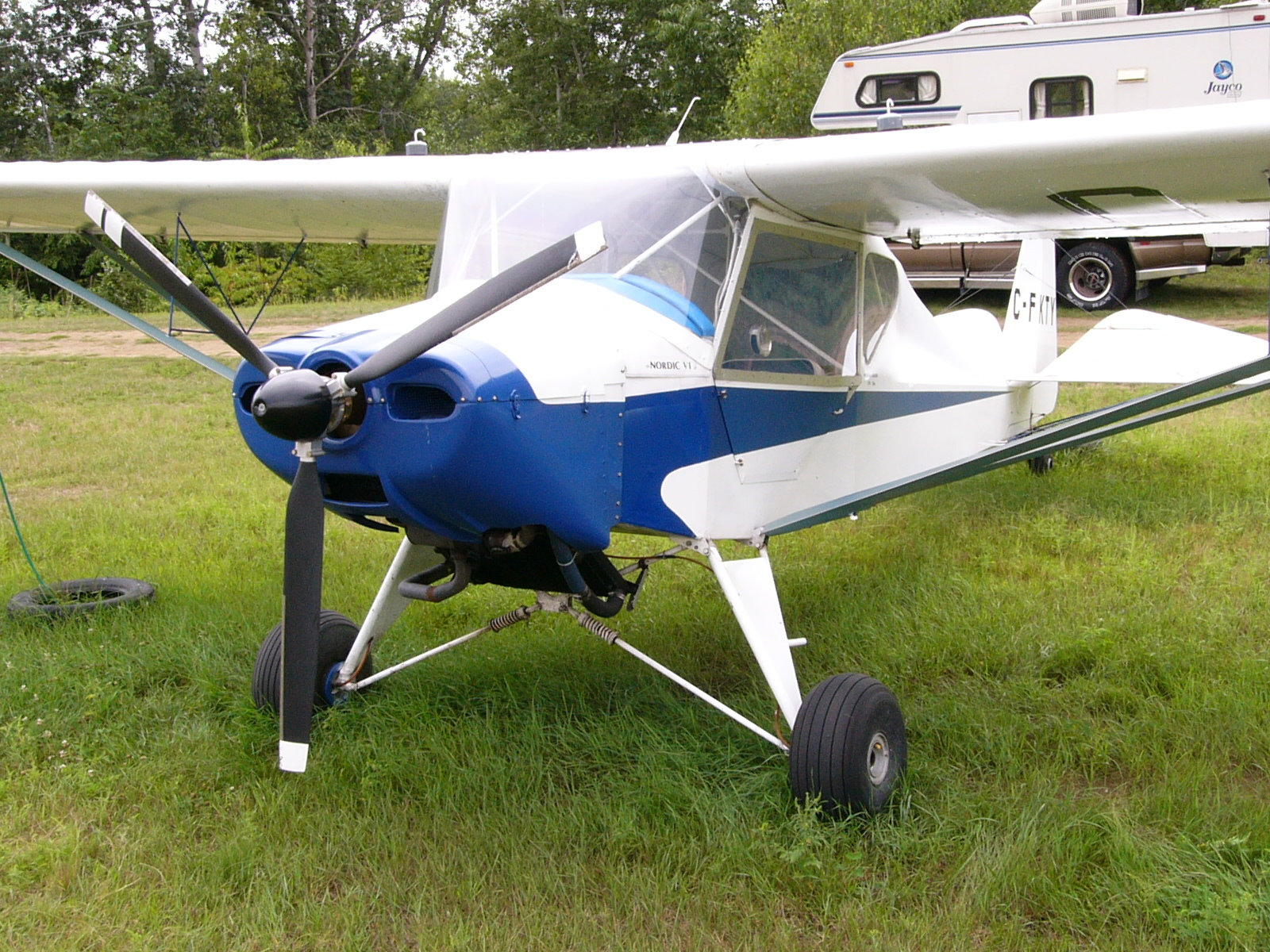
Norman Aviation Nordic VI

Summary of aircraft built by Norman Aviation
Model name	First flight	Number built	Type
Norman Aviation J6 Karatoo			Ultralight aircraft
Norman Aviation Nordic I			Ultralight aircraft
Norman Aviation Nordic II			Ultralight aircraft
Norman Aviation Nordic III			Ultralight aircraft
Norman Aviation Nordic IV			Ultralight aircraft
Norman Aviation Nordic V			Ultralight aircraft
Norman Aviation Nordic VI			Ultralight aircraft
Norman Aviation Nordic VII			Ultralight aircraft
Norman Aviation Nordic 8 Mini Explorer			Ultralight camper aircraft
