= Canadian Owners and Pilots Association =

Canadian non-profit organization

- Established: 1952; 74 years ago
- Type: Not for profit
- Headquarters: Ottawa, Ontario, Canada
- Field: General Aviation, Advocacy
- Members: 11,000 (2025)
- Board of Directors Chairman: Doug Ronan (2022 - Present)
- President and CEO: Mark van Berkel (May 2023 - Present)
- Website: www.copanational.org

The Canadian Owners and Pilots Association (COPA) (French: Association canadienne des pilotes et propriétaires d'aéronefs) is a federally registered not-for-profit association that provides information and advocacy services for Canadian pilots who fly for non-commercial purposes.

COPA has 13,000 members from every province and territory in Canada. The organization's mission is to "Advance, Promote and Preserve the Canadian Freedom to Fly". Its members represent about 50% of all private and commercial pilots in the country.

== History ==
COPA was formed in 1952 by Ottawa aviators Margaret Carson and John Bogie. They saw the need for an organization to represent the interests of private pilots to the government of Canada. Their model was based on the US-based Aircraft Owners and Pilots Association (AOPA) which had been formed 13 years earlier in 1939. After meeting with AOPA principals and receiving encouragement from them, COPA was set up with headquarters in Carson's garage. As the association grew, they hired their first paid employees and moved into more permanent offices. Bogie became the association's first president and today there is an award in his name to both honour his legacy and to celebrate other outstanding pilots who advance, promote, and preserve the Canadian freedom to fly.

COPA was a founding member of the International Council of Aircraft Owner and Pilot Associations (IAOPA) and remains an active participant in this international body.

In April 2023, the Canadian federal government announced funding of C$558,903 from the Search and Rescue New Initiatives Fund to COPA over three years to establish the COPA Aviation Academy. The academy will be an online teaching tool in English and French, to provide recreational pilots with safety and search and rescue training, with the aim of reducing both incidents and accidents.

== Organization ==
The original association logo used 1952-2017

The association logo used 2017-2020

COPA is governed by a 15-member board of directors, who are elected by the members of the association on a regional basis. They serve four-year terms, with elections held in even-numbered years. Board meetings are held three times a year.

COPA has a staff of eight who work from the association's offices in Ottawa.

== Today ==
Until May 2016, COPA published a monthly tabloid-format newspaper. Since June 2016, it is full colour magazine still named COPA Flight. The first edition featured Chris Hadfield (ret. Canadian Astronaut) as the new voice and spokesperson for COPA. COPA offers their members numerous benefits, including a unique aircraft group insurance program. The program was previously administered by Marsh Canada Limited until August 2011. Currently, the COPA VIP Aviation Insurance program is run by the Magnes Group.

The association also has a large website, with some sections available to members only. The website includes its COPA Resource Guides that provide information to members on buying an aircraft, creating your own aerodrome and dealing with government regulatory enforcement action. There are also guides on each category of aircraft in Canada from ultralights to certified aircraft. COPA also provides technical assistance to its members on aviation questions and problems.

COPA is a registered lobbying organization and conducts advocacy work on behalf of aircraft owners with Transport Canada, Nav Canada and other governmental agencies. The association is a member of each of the Canadian Aviation Regulation Advisory Council's (CARAC) nine technical committees. COPA has a large Special Action Fund renamed the Freedom to Fly Fund collected from its members over the years, which is often used to fund court cases.

The association has a network of more than 200 local chapters across the country. These COPA Flights annually run many local aviation events, including many of Canada's summertime fly-ins.

COPA holds an annual general meeting in June of each year and staff and board of directors attend regional events across the country.

== Youth flying and outreach programs ==
COPA was the Canadian partner in the Experimental Aircraft Association's Young Eagles program between 1992 and 2008. Young Eagles was started in 1992 with the goal of flying more than 1,000,000 young people between ages 8 and 17 by the December 2003 100th anniversary of the Wright Brothers first flight. The goal was met with COPA's members flying about 10% of the total Young Eagles flown in the world. COPA's participation in the program was terminated on 31 May 2008, due to insurance issues.

COPA introduced a replacement program, under the name COPA For Kids Aviation Program on 11 February 2009. Then COPA President Kevin Psutka stated:

The COPA For Kids Aviation Program has been inspired by Young Eagles but is not associated in any way with Young Eagles or the EAA. I am pleased that the EAA will continue the Young Eagles program through its Canadian Chapters. With our two programs in place, we can maximize the opportunity for kids to experience the thrill of flight.

In 2021, the program was renamed Discover Aviation to be more inclusive of adults interested in discovering aviation. Each year, COPA's chapters (known as COPA Flights) organize Discover Aviation events all across Canada. On average, 30 events are held each year.

== Scholarships ==
COPA offers nearly $33,000 in flight training scholarships for those pursuing their private pilot licence, and those interested in advanced flight training ratings. These scholarships include:

- The COPA Neil J. Armstrong Ab-Initio Scholarship: This is open to Canadian citizens or permanent residents aged 16 to 21 at the time of the application. One individual is awarded up to $14,000 to pursue their private pilot licence (PPL).
- The COPA New Wings Scholarship: This scholarship is sponsored by Diamond Doors and is open to Canadian citizens or permanent residents aged 21 and older. One individual is awarded $5,000 to pursue their private pilot licence (PPL).
- The COPA Advanced Flight Training Scholarship: This scholarships is open to COPA members 18 years of age and older pursuing advanced flight training ratings.
- The COPA Drone Pilot Scholarship: This scholarship is open to COPA members 18 years of age and older interested in pursuing their advanced RPAS (remotely piloted aircraft systems) certificate.
