= Aeronautics Act =

Act of the Parliament of Canada governing civil aviation

Parliament of Canada
- Long title: An Act to authorize the control of aeronautics
- Citation: R.S.C. 1985, c. A-2
- Assented to: 1985
- Status: Current legislation

The Aeronautics Act R.S. 1985, c. A-2 (French: Loi sur l'aéronautique) is the legislation that governs civil aviation in Canada.

The Act consists of a lengthy interpretation section which defines many key terms:

- Part I deals with Aeronautics in general.
- Part II deals with military investigations involving accidents between civilian and military aircraft.
- Part III deals with staff responsibilities.
- Part IV dealt with Civilian Aviation Tribunal was repealed in 2001 and replaced with Civil Aviation Tribunal Rules.

One of the main effects of the Act is to enable the Canadian Aviation Regulations.

== See also ==
- Air Board (Canada)
