= Canadian Airports Council =

Canadian trade association

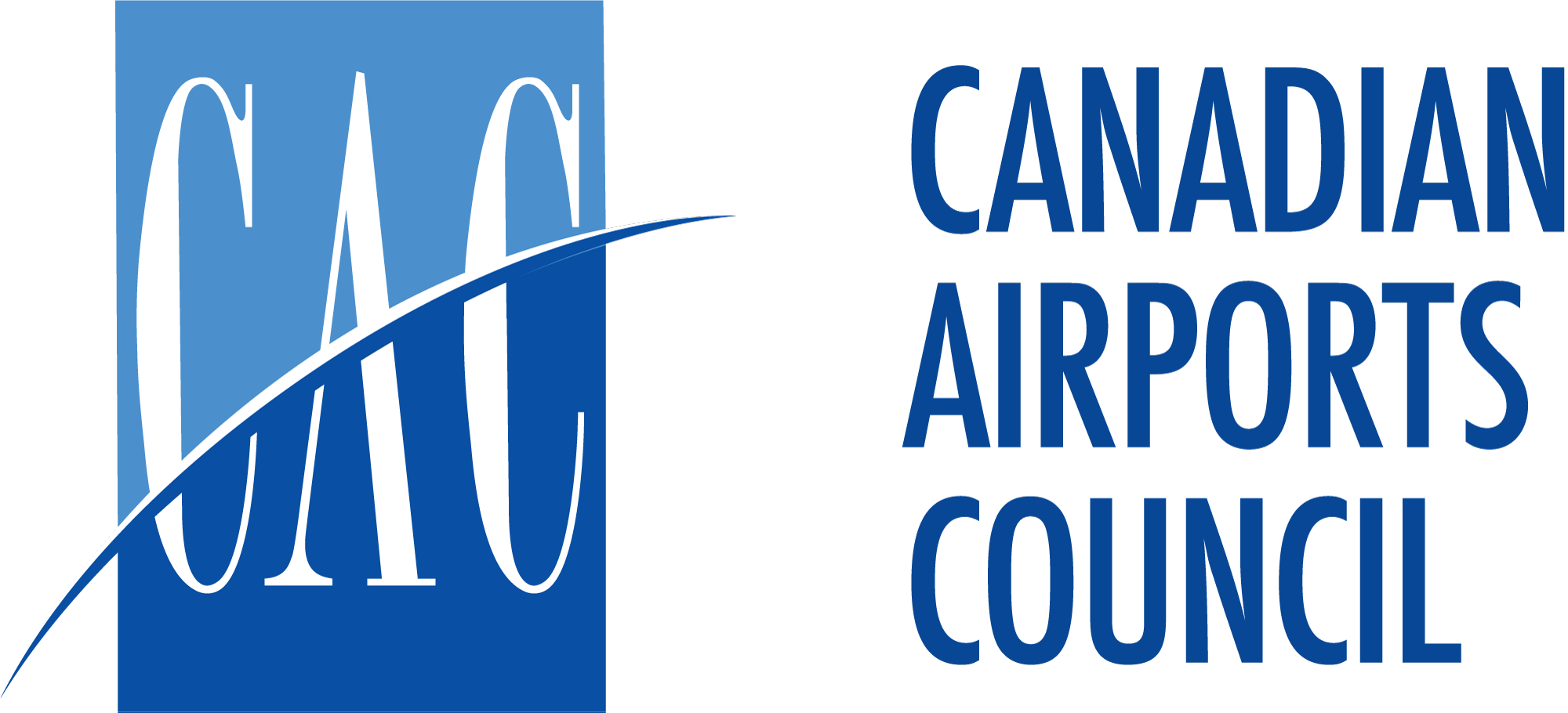
- Founded: 1992
- Headquarters: Canada

The Canadian Airports Council (CAC) is the Canadian trade association for Canada's airports. It is a division of Airports Council International-North America.

Formed in 1992, as the devolution of airports to local control was beginning under Canada's National Airports Policy, the CAC has 54 airport operator members that represent more than 100 airports across Canada. These include all the non-governmental airports in Canada's National Airports System and other commercial airports in every province and territory.

Since 2011, Daniel-Robert Gooch has been the president of CAC in an Ottawa office with six full-time staff.

Previous CAC logo

CAC members include the eight largest airports in Canada:

- Calgary Airport Authority, operator of Calgary International Airport
- Edmonton Regional Airports Authority, operator of Edmonton International Airport
- Halifax International Airport Authority, operator of Halifax Stanfield International Airport
- Aéroports de Montréal, operator of Montréal-Trudeau International Airport and the International Aerocity of Mirabel
- Ottawa International Airport Authority, operator of Ottawa Macdonald-Cartier International Airport
- Greater Toronto Airports Authority, operator of Toronto Pearson International Airport
- Vancouver Airport Authority, operator of Vancouver International Airport
- Winnipeg Airports Authority, operator of Winnipeg James Armstrong Richardson International Airport
