= Canadian Aviation Regulations =

Rules governing civil aviation in Canada

The Canadian Aviation Regulations (CARs) are the rules that govern civil aviation in Canada.

== Establishment ==
The CARs became law on October 10, 1996, replacing the former Air Regulations and Air Navigation Orders. The authority for the establishment of the CARs is the Aeronautics Act. Both the Act and the CARs are the responsibility of the Minister of Transport and her department, Transport Canada.

== Organization ==
The CARs are divided into ten functional "parts":

- Part I - General Provisions
- Part II - Aircraft Identification and Registration and Operation of a Leased Aircraft by a Non-registered Owner
- Part III - Aerodromes, Airports and Heliports
- Part IV - Personnel Licensing and Training
- Part V - Airworthiness
- Part VI - General Operating and Flight Rules
- Part VII - Commercial Air Services
- Part VIII - Air Navigation Services
- Part IX - Remotely Piloted Aircraft Systems
- Part X - Greenhouse Gas Emissions from International Aviation - CORSIA

The CARs consist of regulations, standards and advisory material. Compliance with the regulations and standards is mandatory, while complying with the advisory material is not mandatory. Standards tell how to comply with the corresponding regulation.

With the exception of Part V, the regulations are numbered starting at the beginning of the part (i.e. CAR 700 is a regulation). The standards are numbered in the "20" series (i.e. CAR 720 is a standard). Advisory material is inserted in the text of the regulations and standards as "notes" or is included separately as "40" series text (i.e. CAR 740 would be advisory material).

Part V (Airworthiness) of the CARs is uniquely numbered to match the US FAA FARs parts as well as the EASA and JAA regulations. As such it has regulations and standards that have the same number (i.e. There is a CAR 507 and a STD 507).

== Amending the CARs ==
Creation of new regulations or standards and the amendment of existing regulations and standards are accomplished through a public consultation process known as the Canadian Aviation Regulation Advisory Council (CARAC).

== Advisory Circulars (ACs) ==
Transport Canada also makes available other publications, known as Advisory Circulars, that are intended to assist companies and individuals governed by the CARs comply with the regulations and standards. Prior to 1 Feb 2007, these were divided into other groups called Commercial and Business Aviation Advisory Circulars (CBAACs), General Aviation Advisory Circulars (GAACs), Aerodrome Safety Circulars (ASCs), General Aviation Policy Letters (GAPLs), and Maintenance and Manufacturing Policy Letters (MPLs). Although these alternate documents are no longer issued or amended, historical versions of those that have not been cancelled remain in effect.
