= Ultralight aircraft (Canada) =

Category of aircraft in Canada

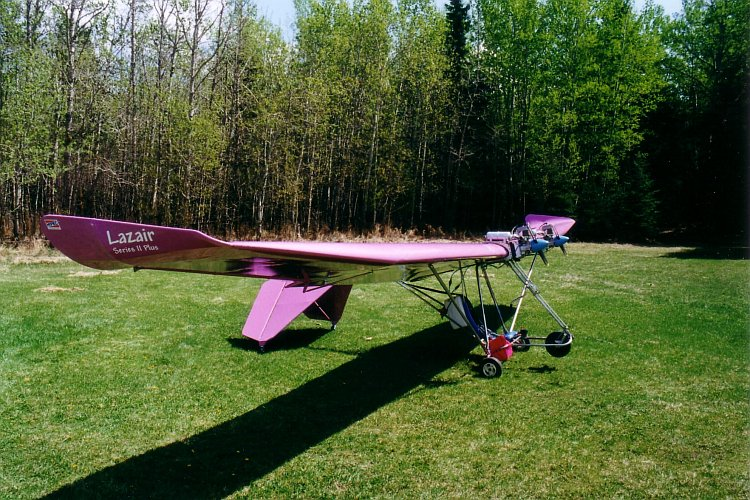
The basic ultralight Ultraflight Lazair is the most produced Canadian-designed aircraft of any category.

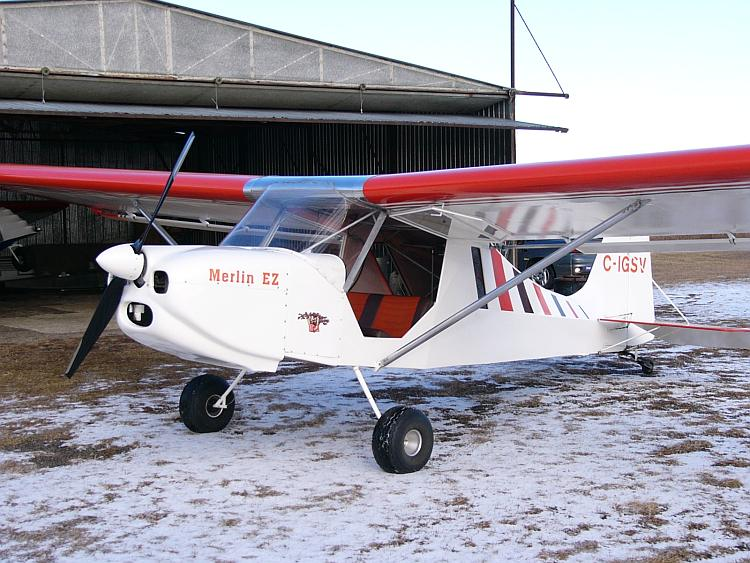
Blue Yonder Merlin EZ Canadian-designed and built advanced ultralight airplane

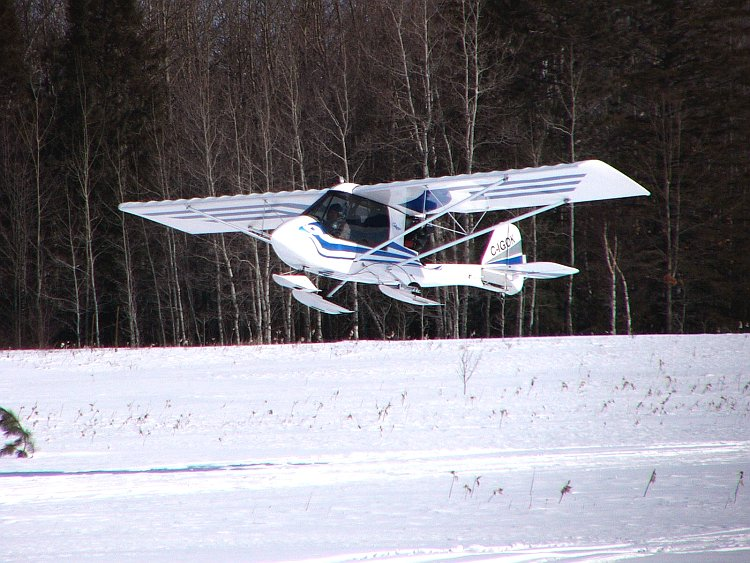
A common advanced ultralight seen in Canada: Quad City Challenger II

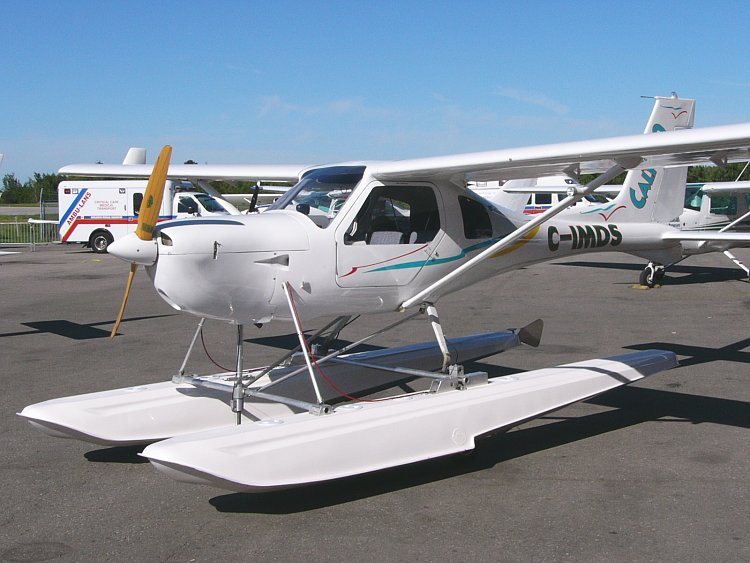
Jabiru Calypso 3300 advanced ultralight aircraft on amphibious floats at the Canadian Aviation Expo

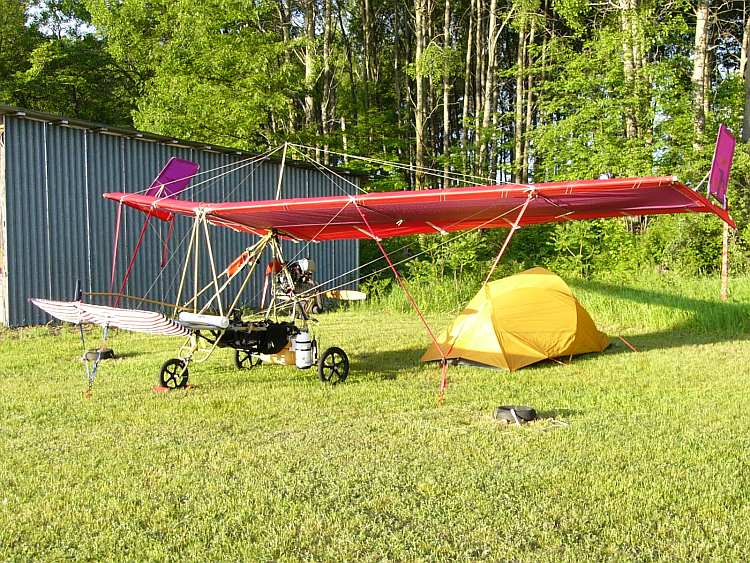
Fly camping at a remote aerodrome with a Canadian registered DFE Ascender III-C.

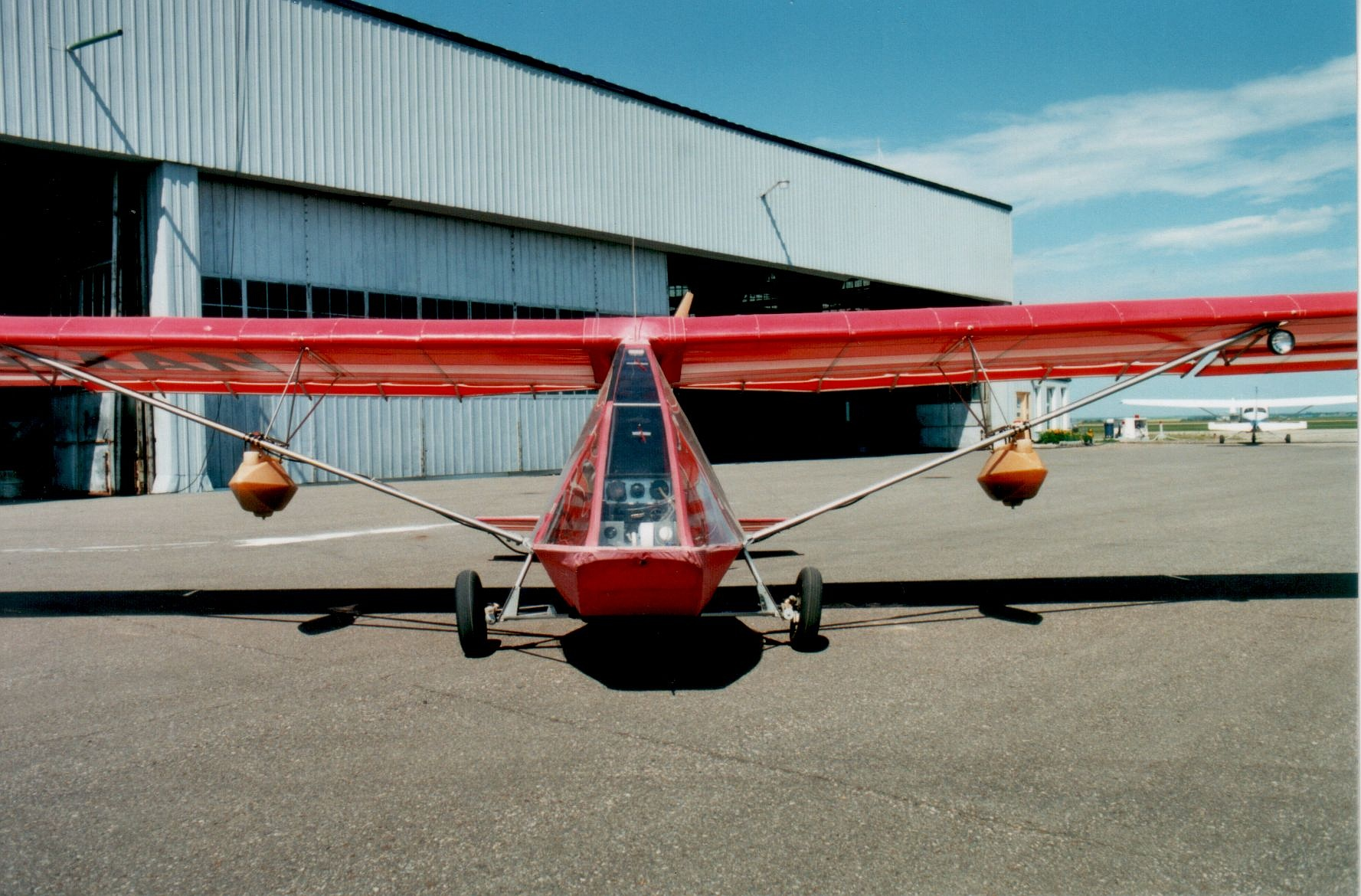
The Canadian designed and built Birdman Chinook 2S, designed by Wladimir Talanczuk in 1981/82.

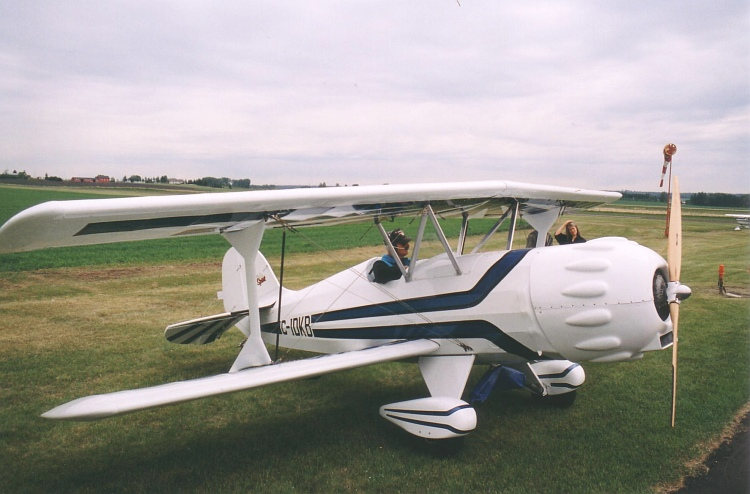
Murphy Renegade Spirit ultra light biplane.

The Canadian Aviation Regulations define two types of ultralight aircraft: basic ultra-light aeroplane (BULA), and advanced ultra-light aeroplane (AULA).

== Definition ==
Regulation of ultra-light aircraft in Canada is covered by the Canadian Aviation Regulations. An earlier definition of "ultra-light aeroplane", effective October 10, 1996, meant:

- a single-seat aeroplane that has a launch weight of 165 kg (364 pounds) or less, and a wing area, expressed in square metres, of not less than the launch weight in kilograms minus 15, divided by 10, and in no case less than 10 m^{2} (110 sq ft),
- a two-seat instructional aeroplane that has a launch weight of 195 kg (430 pounds) or less, and a wing area, expressed in square metres, of not less than 10 m^{2} and a wing loading of not more than 25 kg/m^{2} (5.12 lb/ft^{2}), the wing loading being calculated using the launch weight plus the occupant weight of 80 kg (176 pounds) per person, or
- an advanced ultra-light aeroplane;

On June 1, 2003, the definition was amended to state that an "ultra-light aeroplane" means either an advanced ultra-light aeroplane or a basic ultra-light aeroplane.

=== Basic ===
On July 6, 1956, the Department of Transport first issued new requirements for ultralight aircraft, a category that was eventually renamed "Amateur-built aircraft", leaving Canada without an ultralight category. The basic ultralight category was established as a new category in 1982 to fill this gap. Regulation of ultralight aircraft in Canada is covered by the Canadian Aviation Regulations, which defines a "basic ultra-light aeroplane" as:

an aeroplane having no more than two seats, designed and manufactured to have:

- a maximum take-off weight not exceeding 544 kg (1,200 pounds), and
- a stall speed in the landing configuration (V_{S0}) of 39 knots (45 mph) indicated airspeed, or less, at the maximum take-off weight;

=== Advanced ===
According to Canadian Aviation Regulations, Part I, Subpart 1, an "advanced ultra-light aeroplane" means an aeroplane that has a type design that is in compliance with the standards specified in the manual entitled Design Standards for Advanced Ultra-light Aeroplanes (DS10141).

An advanced ultra-light aeroplane is an aeroplane which:

- Is propeller driven;
- Is designed to carry a maximum of two persons, including the pilot;
- Has a maximum take-off mass, M_{TOmax} or W_{TOmax}, of:
  1. 350 kg (770 lb) for a single place aeroplane, or
  2. 560.0 kg (1232 lb) for a two place aeroplane;
- A maximum stalling speed in the landing configuration, V_{S0}, at manufacturer's recommended maximum take-off mass (weight) not exceeding 72 km/h (20 m/s, 45 mph) (IAS); and
- Is limited to non-aerobatic operations. Non-aerobatic operations include:
  1. manoeuvres incident to normal flying
  2. stalls and spins (if approved for type);
  3. lazy eights, chandelles; and
  4. steep turns, in which the angle of bank is not more than 60°

The advanced ultra-light aeroplane (AULA) category is similar, but not identical, to the American Light-Sport Aircraft (LSA) category. Many aircraft are available as AULAs in Canada and LSAs in the United States.

==== Minimum useful load ====
Advanced ultra-light aeroplanes shall have a minimum useful load, M_{U} or W_{U} computed as follows:

- For a single place aeroplane:

M_{U} = 80 + 0.3P, in kg; where P is the rated engine(s) power in kilowatts;
M_{U} = 175 + 0.5P, in lb; where P is the rated engine(s) power in brake horsepower (bhp).

- For a two place aeroplane:

M_{U} = 160 + 0.3P, in kg; where P is the rated engine(s) power in kW;
M_{U} = 350 + 0.5P, in lb; where P is the rated engine(s) power in bhp.

==== Maximum empty mass (weight) ====
The maximum empty mass, M_{E_{max}}, (W_{E_{max}}) includes all operational equipment that is actually installed in the aeroplane. It includes the mass (weight) of the airframe, powerplant, required equipment, optional and specific equipment, fixed ballast, full engine coolant, hydraulic fluid, and the residual fuel and oil. Hence, the maximum empty mass (weight) = maximum take-off mass (weight) - minimum useful load.

The registration marks for an advanced ultra-light aeroplane after 1997 begin with "C-Ixxx". Prior to that date they were C-Fxxx or C-Gxxx.

== Operations ==
An ultra-light pilot permit, recreational pilot permit, private, commercial or airline transport aeroplane licence issued by Transport Canada, is required in order for a person to operate an ultra-light aeroplane in Canada. Pilots holding a Recreational or higher license may carry a passenger in a two-seat advanced ultra-light aeroplane. Pilots with only an ultra-light permit may not carry a passenger in an advanced ultralight unless they have received a passenger carrying endorsement. Basic ultralights cannot carry passengers unless the passenger is another pilot. Student pilots undergoing training may be carried in basic ultralights.

Canadian Basic and Advanced Ultralights may be flown in the USA if the pilot holds a Recreational Pilot Permit or higher designation. Pilots holding an Ultralight Pilot Permit with instructor rating and who have at least 2 hours of cross country experience may also fly to the US.

Any Canadian Ultralight flying to the US also requires a Special Flight Operations Certificate from the FAA. This is a form the pilot completes which is then valid for 180 days.

== Nomenclature ==
Officially this category of aircraft are known in Canada as Ultra-light Aeroplanes although in common use the American term Ultralight Airplanes is often used.

== See also ==
- Pilot licensing in Canada
