= Zenair Zipper =

Canadian ultralight aircraft

Zipper

General information
- Type: Ultralight aircraft
- National origin: Canada
- Manufacturer: Zenair
- Designer: Chris Heintz
- Primary user: private owners

History
- Introduction date: 1983

The Zenair Zipper is a Canadian ultralight high-wing, single seat aircraft that was designed by Chris Heintz and produced by Zenair.

The Zipper is a highly innovative design that strongly emphasizes portability over speed or carrying capacity.

== Development ==
The Zipper was designed in the early 1980s by established Canadian aircraft designer Chris Heintz and put into production by his company Zenair, of Midland, Ontario. Heintz's motivation for the Zipper was the ultralight aviation boom that was occurring in Canada at that time and the introduction of new aviation regulations by Transport Canada legally permitting the operation of ultralights.

The Zipper incorporates many unique features, all aimed at making the aircraft more portable. This focus was due to the nature of operations in the early days of the ultralight popularity. Aircraft were not flown great distances to fly-ins or other sites, but were transported by trailer or on car top to be flown locally at remote locations.

The Zipper has a quick-folding wing, built around a D-cell leading edge and spar. There are no wing ribs and the trailing edge of the wing is established by a cable which tensions the sailcloth wing covering. The wing is folded by releasing the anti-drag cables next to the nosewheel and folding the wings back along the tailboom, still supported by their struts. The wing is designed to +6 and -3 g.

The Zipper features conventional three-axis controls, which was unusual in ultralights designed at this time. The all-metal, one piece, all-flying rudder and the elevator are quickly removable for transport. The tailboom is aluminum and square in cross section.

The standard powerplants provided with the Zipper kits were the JPX PUL 425 engine of 26 hp (19 kW) and the Rotax 277 of 28 hp (21 kW). Fuel capacity is 6 US gal (5 imp gal; 23 L). The twin-engined Zipper II used a similar engine configuration to its competitor, the Ultraflight Lazair, placing both engines close together to minimize engine-out requirements.

== Operational history ==
Zenith Aircraft Company President Sebastien Heintz, son of the designer Chris Heintz, learned to fly in a Zenair Zipper.

In December 2008 there were four Zippers still registered in Canada. Consisting of two Zippers, one Zipper-RX and one Zipper II

== Variants ==
Zipper
Powerplant is one JPX PUL 425 or 212
Zipper-RX
Powerplant is one Rotax 277 engine of 28 hp
Zipper II
Powerplants are two JPX PUL 212. There were 12 built.

== Specifications (Zipper PUL 425 engine) ==
Data from Ultralight Aircraft Shopper's Guide 8th Edition

General characteristics

- Crew: One
- Capacity: 240 lb (109 kg) useful load
- Wingspan: 28 ft 0 in (8.54 m)
- Wing area: 140 sq ft (13.25 m^{2})
- Empty weight: 180 lb (82 kg)
- Gross weight: 420 lb (190 kg)
- Max takeoff weight: 420 lb (190 kg)
- Powerplant: 1 × JPX PUL 425 fixed pitch, 26 hp (19 kW)

Performance

- Maximum speed: 50 mph (81 km/h, 43 kn)
- Cruise speed: 40 mph (65 km/h, 35 kn)
- Stall speed: 20 mph (32 km/h, 17 kn)
- Range: 100 mi (162 km, 87 nmi)
- Rate of climb: 700 ft/min (3.6 m/s)
- Wing loading: 3.0 lb/sq ft (14.3 kg/m^{2})
- Power/mass: 19.1 lb/hp (0.087 kW/kg)

== See also ==
Aircraft of comparable role, configuration, and era

- AmEagle American Eaglet
- Avid Champion
- Beaujon Enduro
- Beaujon Mach .07
- Birdman TL-1
- Chotia Gypsy
- Chotia Weedhopper
- Eipper Quicksilver
- Kolb Flyer
- Milholland Legal Eagle
- Mitchell U-2 Superwing
- Pterodactyl Ascender
- Ultraflight Lazair
- Wings of Freedom Flitplane
