= Chotia Weedhopper =

American ultralight airplane

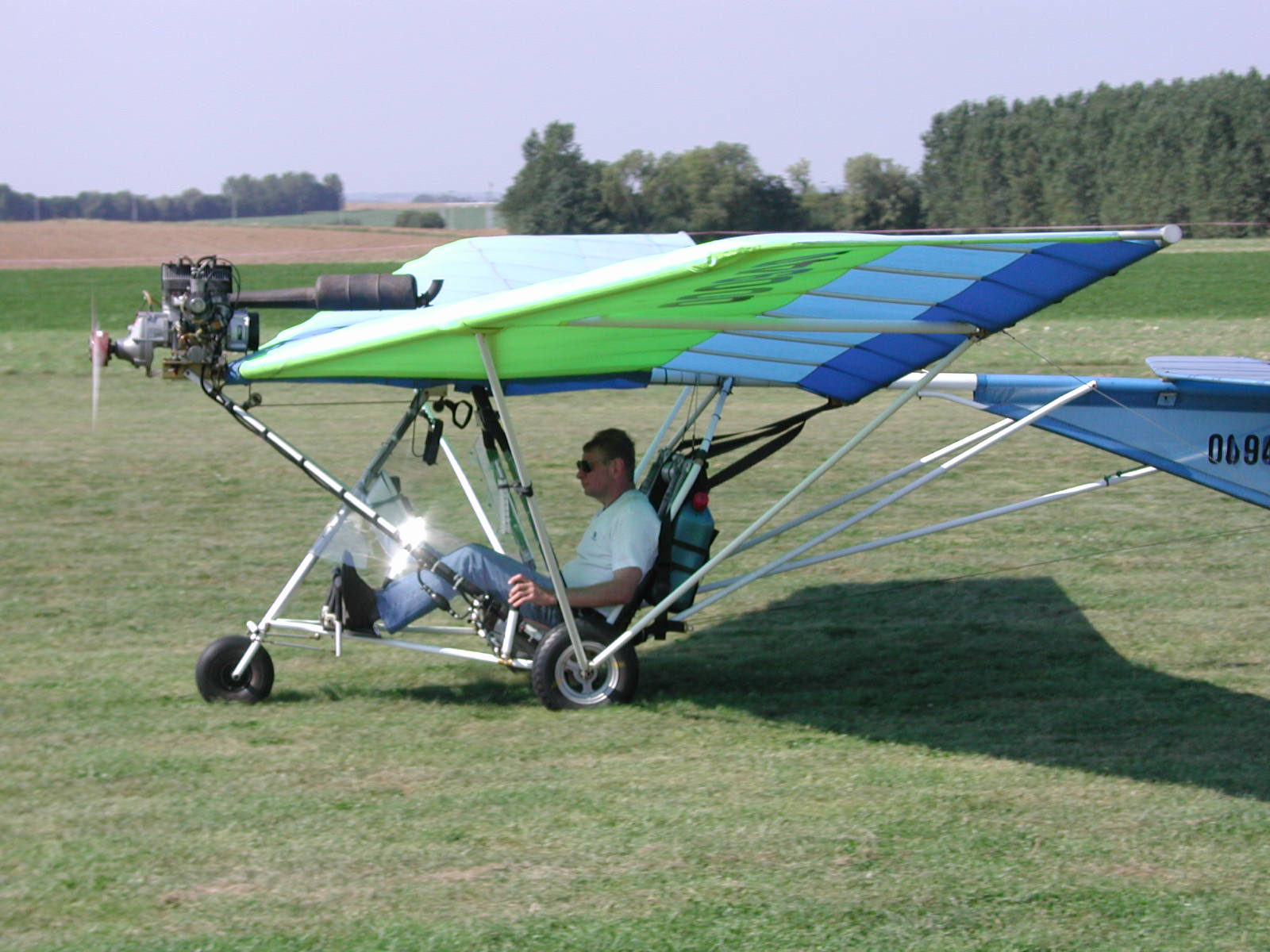
- Weedhopper

General information
- Type: Ultralight aircraft
- National origin: United States
- Manufacturer: Weedhopper Aircraft
- Designer: John Chotia
- Status: Production completed
- Number built: 13,000 (2007)

History
- Manufactured: 1977-2012
- Introduction date: 1977
- Variants: Chotia Woodhopper; Cyclone AX2000; Flylab Tucano; Raj Hamsa X-Air

The Weedhopper is an American high-wing, tractor configuration, tricycle gear, two-axis control ultralight aircraft originally developed by John Chotia during the height of the 1970s ultralight boom and introduced in 1977. When it was in production the aircraft was sold as a kit for amateur construction and could be assembled in 25-30 man-hours.

By early 2013 the company website had been blanked and put up for sale and it is likely that the company has closed and production ended.

== Design and development ==
Many of the early ultralights used a "weight shift" method of control, requiring the pilot to push a control bar to shift the center of gravity of the aircraft. The Weedhopper differed from most other ultralights of the period in that it has a control stick which moves the rudder and elevator, giving it two-axis control in pitch and yaw. The pronounced dihedral of the wings, along with the swept leading edge causes it to bank into the turn, and results in a very stable, easy-to-fly aircraft. The Weedhopper differs from many of the other early ultralights in that it had a strut-braced wing, whereas most period ultralights have wire-braced wings.

The Weedhopper is constructed from aluminium tubing and covered with Dacron pre-sewn envelopes. The early versions of the aircraft developed a poor reputation due to the lack of reliable engines available in the 1970s. This was rectified with the adoption of the Rotax 277 28 hp (21 kW) and later the Rotax 447 40 hp (30 kW) powerplant.

Over 13,000 Weedhoppers have been sold. It was popular because it offered people an inexpensive way to fly for pleasure. The aircraft could be easily disassembled and put on a trailer for home storage. It was not necessary to rent an expensive hangar. It could also be flown from just about any field because of its short takeoff and landing requirements (about 100 feet (30 m) with no obstacles). The kits originally sold for $2,000, and in 2011 the Weedhopper model 40 sold for US$8,495.

In its home country versions of the aircraft are eligible for the FAR 103 Ultralight Vehicles category, the experimental amateur-built category and the light-sport aircraft category.

== Variants ==
Weedhopper A
Initial production version, also known as the JC-24A.
Weedhopper B
Improved production version, also known as the JC-24B.
Weedhopper C
Improved production version, also known as the JC-24C.
Weedhopper Standard
Basic model with a 28 hp (21 kW) Rotax 277 engine and an empty weight of 235 lb (107 kg) for the US amateur-built category.
Weedhopper Deluxe
Improved production model with a 40 hp (30 kW) Rotax 447 engine.
Weedhopper 40
Current production model with a 40 hp (30 kW) Rotax 447 engine.
Weedhopper Super
Up-engined model with a 50 hp (37 kW) Rotax 503 engine, many extras and an empty weight of 330 lb (150 kg) for the US amateur-built category.
Weedhopper II
Current production two seat side-by-side seating model with a 50 hp (37 kW) Rotax 503 engine. Also known as the Weedhopper Two Place.

== Aircraft on display ==
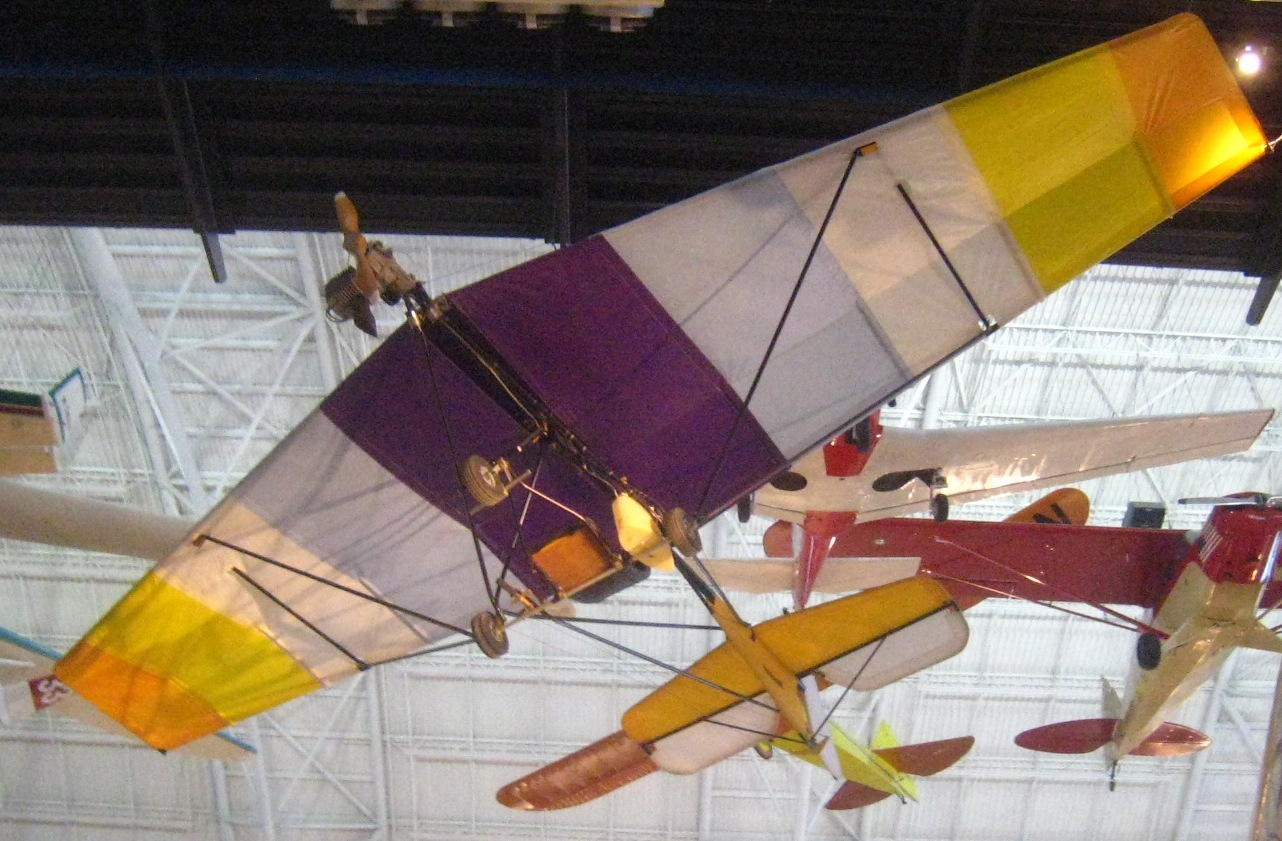
Weedhopper JC-24C in the National Air and Space Museum.

- National Air and Space Museum

== Specifications (Weedhopper Model 40) ==
Data from Weedhopper Aircraft

General characteristics

- Crew: one
- Length: 18 ft 6 in (5.64 m)
- Wingspan: 28 ft 0 in (8.53 m)
- Height: 6 ft 9 in (2.06 m)
- Wing area: 168 sq ft (15.6 m^{2})
- Empty weight: 250 lb (113 kg)
- Gross weight: 550 lb (249 kg)
- Fuel capacity: 5 US gallons (19 litres)
- Powerplant: 1 × Rotax 447 twin-cylinder, two-stroke aircraft engine, 40 hp (30 kW)
- Propellers: 2-bladed Powerfin ground adjustable

Performance

- Cruise speed: 55 mph (89 km/h, 48 kn)
- Stall speed: 20 mph (32 km/h, 17 kn)
- Never exceed speed: 65 mph (105 km/h, 56 kn)
- Rate of climb: 1,000 ft/min (5.1 m/s)

Avionics

- none

== Comparable aircraft ==
- AmEagle American Eaglet
- Avid Champion
- Beaujon Enduro
- Beaujon Mach .07
- Birdman TL-1
- Pterodactyl Ascender
- Mitchell U-2 Superwing
- Ultraflight Lazair
- Eipper Quicksilver
