= Kolb Ultrastar =

American ultralight aircraft

General information
- Type: Ultralight aircraft
- National origin: United States
- Manufacturer: Kolb Aircraft
- Designer: Homer Kolb
- Status: Production complete

History
- Introduction date: 1982
- Developed from: Kolb Flyer

The Kolb Ultrastar is an American single seat, high wing, strut-braced, single engine, pusher configuration, conventional landing gear-equipped ultralight aircraft that was produced in kit form by Kolb Aircraft of Phoenixville, Pennsylvania and intended for amateur construction.

The Ultrastar was the second design produced by Kolb Aircraft, was a redesigned and improved Kolb Flyer and succeeded the Flyer in production.

== Design and development ==
The Ultrastar features a completely open cockpit with the pilot exposed to the slipstream. Unusually for this period in aircraft history when most ultralights had two-axis control, the Ultrastar has standard three-axis controls, including full span ailerons.

When the original Flyer was designed there were no suitable lightweight engines available, so the Flyer first fitted two Chrysler powerplants and later two 11.5 hp (9 kW) Solo 209 engines. With the advent of better engines the Ultrastar moved to a single Cuyuna 430 engine producing 35 hp (26 kW).

The design features a forward fuselage of welded 4130 steel tubing, mated to an aluminum tailboom. The horizontal stabilizer, tail fin and wings are also constructed of riveted aluminum tubing with all flying surfaces covered in doped aircraft fabric. The Ultrastar introduced the trademark folding wings and tail that became a feature of future Kolb designs.

Like the Flyer, the Ultrastar's conventional landing gear consists of sprung steel tubing for the main gear but replaced the Flyer's sprung tail skid with a steerable sprung tail wheel instead.

== Variants ==
Ultrastar
Original model
Ultrastar KX430
Improved model with simplified steel tubular pilot cage and main landing gear tubular spring suspension

== Specifications (Ultrastar) ==
Data from Cliche

General characteristics

- Crew: one
- Wingspan: 27 ft 6 in (8.38 m)
- Wing area: 150 sq ft (14 m^{2})
- Empty weight: 235 lb (107 kg)
- Gross weight: 470 lb (213 kg)
- Fuel capacity: 5 U.S. gallons (19 L; 4.2 imp gal)
- Powerplant: 1 × Cuyuna 430 in-line twin-cylinder, two-stroke, single ignition, aircraft engine, 35 hp (26 kW)

Performance

- Maximum speed: 63 mph (101 km/h, 55 kn)
- Cruise speed: 40 mph (64 km/h, 35 kn)
- Stall speed: 20 mph (32 km/h, 17 kn)
- Rate of climb: 1,000 ft/min (5.1 m/s)

Avionics

- none

== See also ==
Related development

- Kolb Flyer

Aircraft of comparable role, configuration, and era

- Eipper Quicksilver
- Ultraflight Lazair
- Zenair Zipper
