= Zanzottera MZ 100 =

Two-stroke aircraft engine

MZ 100
- Type: Aircraft engine
- National origin: Italy
- Manufacturer: Zanzottera Technologies; Compact Radial Engines

The Zanzottera MZ 100 is an Italian aircraft engine, intended for use in powered paragliders.

The engine was originally designed and produced by Zanzottera Technologies of Italy, but the design was sold, along with the rest of the company's two-stroke ultralight aircraft engine line to Compact Radial Engines of Surrey, British Columbia, Canada. Compact Radial Engines was then in turn acquired by Fiate Aviation Co., Ltd. of Hefei, Anhui, China in August 2017. Fiate Aviation did not advertise the engine as available in 2021.

== Design and development ==
The engine is a single-cylinder two-stroke, 98 cc (6.0 cu in) displacement, air-cooled, gasoline engine design, with a poly V belt reduction drive with reduction ratio of 3.64:1. It produces 18 hp (13 kW) at 9700 rpm. It can be fitted with a recoil starter or electric start.

== Specifications (MZ100) ==
Data from Tacke

=== General characteristics ===
- Type: Single cylinder, two stroke aircraft engine
- Bore: 50 mm (2.0 in)
- Stroke: 50 mm (2.0 in)
- Displacement: 98 cc (6.0 cu in)
- Dry weight: 14 kg (30.9 lb)

=== Components ===
- Fuel type: gasoline
- Cooling system: air
- Reduction gear: poly V belt

=== Performance ===
- Power output: 18 hp (13 kW)

== See also ==
Related lists

- List of aircraft engines
