= Ultraflight Lazair =

Canadian ultralight aircraft

Lazair series
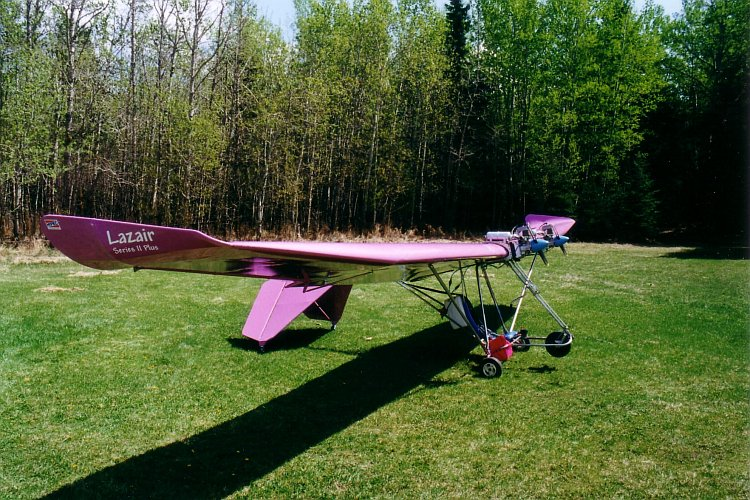
- UltraFlight Lazair Series II

General information
- Type: Ultralight personal, trainer aircraft and police observation aircraft
- National origin: Canada
- Manufacturer: UltraFlight Inc.
- Designer: Dale Kramer
- Primary users: Monterey Park Police Department

History
- Manufactured: 1979 -1984
- Introduction date: 1979
- First flight: 1978

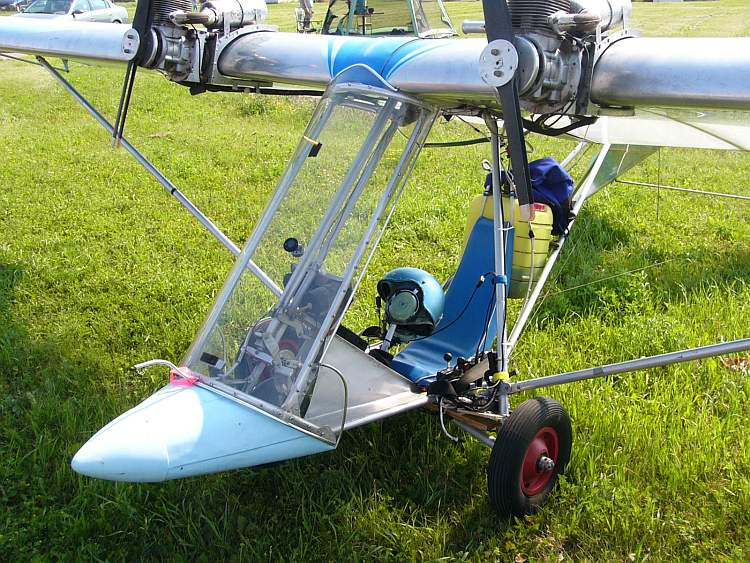
A Lazair Series III with its bottom-mounted control stick. This one has been modified with a streamlined pod and windshield. The engines are the Rotax 185 9.5 hp two-stroke powerplants driving "biplane" propellers.

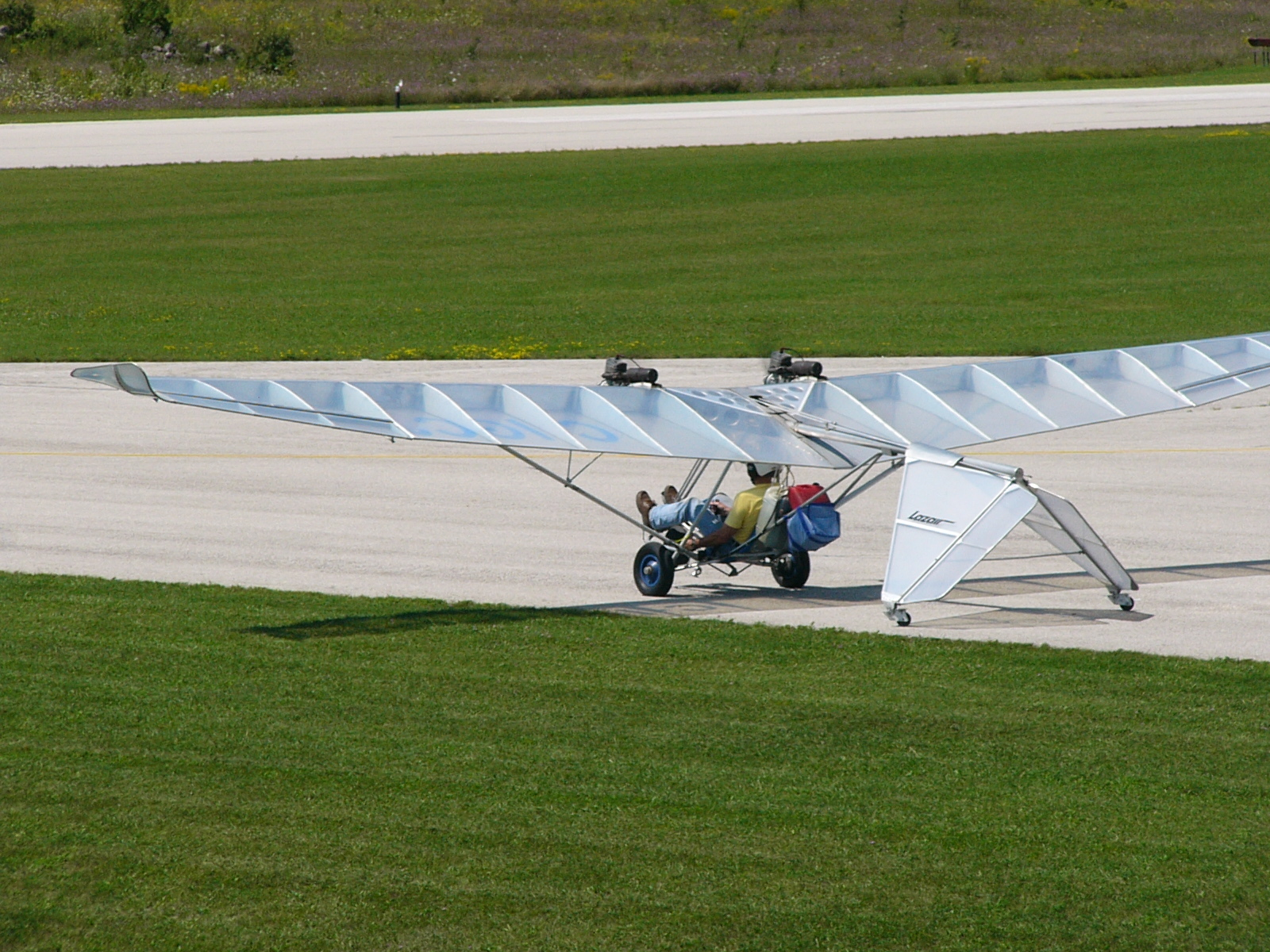
A Lazair Series III showing the original Tedlar covered wings and tail surfaces

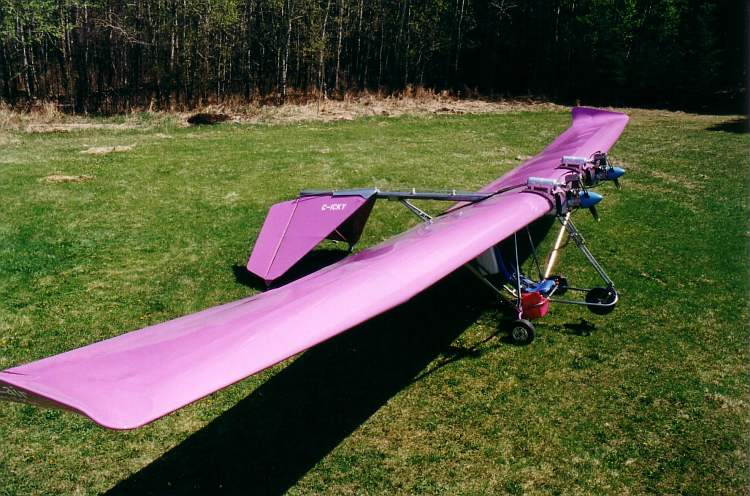
A Lazair Series II displays the very long wing which gives this aircraft good gliding performance. This aircraft has been modified with conventional aircraft fabric and wider main landing gear.

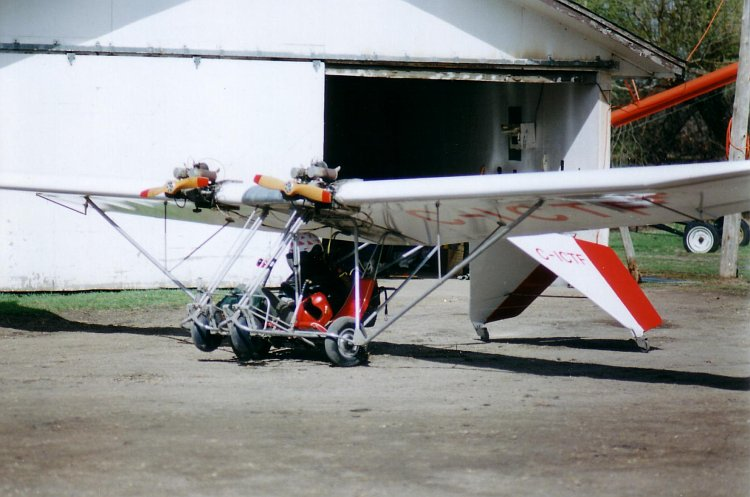
A Lazair II two-seat trainer with its JPX PUL 425 engines of 26 hp (19 kW).

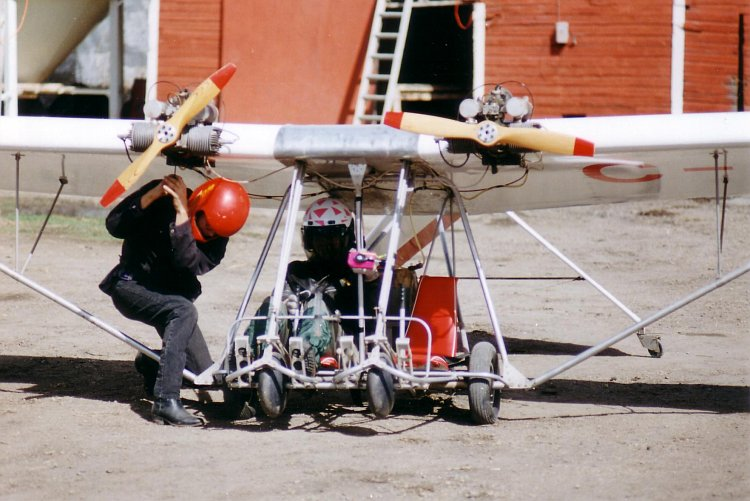
A Lazair II two-seat trainer has one of its JPX PUL 425 engines started. Lazairs generally do not have electrical systems, and their engines are started by recoil start.

The UltraFlight Lazair is a family of Canadian designed and built twin-engine ultralight aircraft that were sold in kit form between 1979 and 1984.

It was one of the first twin-engined ultralights. More Lazairs have been registered in Canada than any other type of Canadian aircraft.

In 2019, Canada Post issued a stamp in honour of the Lazair.

== Development ==
Dale Kramer visited the Oshkosh EAA convention in 1977, where he saw the potential of the ultralight aircraft present. He built and flew an early type of Superfloater ultralight sailplane. Kramer took it to the next year's Oshkosh, where he met Ed Sweeney. Later they fitted it with two of Sweeney's engine kits. Kramer kept the engines and designed a new plane for them, which would remedy the deficiencies he saw in the Superfloater.

He started with a blank sheet of paper and designed a completely new aircraft, the Lazair, even going so far as to design a custom airfoil for it. He named it Lazair for several reasons, including a reference to the successful Laser sailing dinghy of Canadian design, as a contraction of "lazy air" due to the slow cruising speed, and as an allusion to "laissez-faire".

Performance was not as good as anticipated. Although Kramer did most of the test piloting, the lighter Peter Corley took it on its first flight in November 1978. The engines were subsequently moved from their original position below the wing to directly in front of the leading edge. The improvement in performance proved definitive and in this form they demonstrated the prototype Lazair at the EAA Sun 'n Fun International Fly-In and Expo, Florida, in March 1979. It won the award for best home-built microlight, repeating the accolade at Oshkosh that year and receiving thirty-three orders on the spot. Kramer began series production, with Corley as his first demonstration pilot.

== Design ==
The Lazair I is a single-seat conventional high-wing monoplane with an open fuselage frame, inverted V-tail and twin tractor propellers.

As an ultralight aircraft designed for low flying speeds, the fuselage comprises an open frame of aluminum tube supporting the open cockpit, tricycle undercarriage and inverted-V tail.

The wing is mounted at the top of the fuselage frame with additional outboard diagonal bracing struts. It is of straight, constant taper, high aspect ratio planform. The airfoil section is of Kramer's own design and incorporates reverse camber at the trailing edge, giving an S-shaped camber line. The wing has a progressive and constant washout, or reduction in angle of incidence from root to tip. It also features some of the first modern winglets to be seen on a light aircraft. This combination produces an aircraft with optimized low-speed handling and very gentle stall characteristics. The high aspect ratio wing also made the Lazair a good glider, giving it a 12:1 glide ratio, and it could be soared in even light thermal conditions.

The wing structure comprises an aluminum "D" cell leading edge, foam ribs and an aluminum tubular trailing edge. The wing and tail covering for the first 50 Lazair kits was an opaque urethane-impregnated nylon fabric. This was then changed to translucent Mylar PET polymer film, attached to the airframe with single- and two-sided tapes. The Mylar proved to have a short service life due to UV damage, so it was eventually replaced by the more expensive Tedlar PVF film.

For control run simplicity the control stick pivot point was located above the pilot with the stick hanging downwards. Conventional ailerons together with tail ruddervators provided full three-axis control, which although standard on conventional aircraft was unusual for ultralights at the time. The ailerons on the wing and ruddervators on the tail were interconnected so that turns were made with connected rudder and aileron by moving the stick to the side. Pitch control was via conventional fore-and-aft stick movement moving the ruddervators together as elevators.

Kramer opted for two engines instead of one because he wanted to use two of the largest chainsaw motors to obtain the total of 11 hp (8.2 kW) which he deemed necessary to make his "powered glider" fly with performance that was acceptable to him. He placed the two motors as close together as possible to reduce yaw when one failed. The Lazair was one of the first ultralights to incorporate twin engines, greatly improving the reliability and safety of this class of aircraft.

The Lazair was thus built from standard aircraft materials, but it had many innovative design features for an ultralight, including the aerofoil, winglets, inverted-V tail and ruddervators, transparent film covered flying surfaces and twin engines.

Later models incorporated many refinements and options including twin seating in tandem, more powerful engines, fuselage fairings and a conventional control stick pivot position.

== Production ==
The first Lazair prototype was constructed by Kramer with some help from Corley and first flown in 1978.

In 1979, Kramer formed UltraFlight Incorporated to produce the design in his home town of Port Colborne, Ontario. In 1981, "UltraFlight Sales Ltd". was incorporated and sales of all aircraft kits were transferred to that subsidiary.

Production ended in 1984, the company citing "liability concerns" and the resulting cost and availability of insurance as the reason.

The aircraft were widely sold in Canada and the United States, making the Lazair the most numerous Canadian-designed aircraft type. The Series II Lazair was the model produced in the largest numbers.

== Operational history ==
In the 21st century many Lazairs are still in use by private owners. As when first introduced, they remain prized for their handling qualities, if not their cruising speed.

In November 2007 the Canadian register still carried a total of 460 Lazairs of all models. In the USA where the majority of Lazairs are flown as unregistered FAR Part 103 ultralights there were also ten registered as amateur-builts in November 2007.

== Variants and derivatives ==
Series I

The first Lazair kits were originally marketed just under the model name "Lazair", but were later termed "Series I" after improved models had appeared. From the first Lazair prototype, to the last Lazair kit produced, no changes were made to the aerodynamic design of the wing panels and tail surfaces. All the wing panels had the same airfoil sections, planform, washout, wing tip design, aileron design and incidence to fuselage (including the two place). All the tail surfaces had the same airfoil (flat), planform (minor difference with different tailwheels), washout (none), distance from the wing and incidence to the fuselage.

The initial model Lazair was a single-seater with a 36.3-foot (11.1 m) wingspan and was powered by two 5.5 hp 100 cc Pioneer chainsaw engines, directly driving plastic propellers in tractor configuration. The main landing gear used 16-inch (410 mm) wheels with a track of just 26 inches, which combined with the long wing span, meant that taxiing in more than 7 mph (11 km/h) of wind required a wing walker. Tail skids were fitted to the inverted V-tail.

Series II

There was customer demand for putting the Lazair on floats, but this required more power than the Pioneer powerplants could develop. The solution was to substitute 9.5 horsepower (7.1 kW) Rotax 185 engines. These single-cylinder engines were used extensively in forest fire fighting water pumps and had proved reliable in that application.

The propellers were the same plastic units used on the Series I with its 5.5 hp (4.1 kW) engines. To absorb the greater power two propellers were stacked to form a "biplane propeller". This was done because UltraFlight had ample supplies of the existing propellers and using them saved money over developing a new propeller. Also, since inception, the Lazair was designed as a powered glider, so stacking of the two propellers in a bi-plane mode created a propeller that had less drag when gliding than if the 4 blades were 90 degrees apart. Any slight loss in thrust due to stacking was accepted since there was less drag when gliding.

During the production of the Series II the tail skids were replaced with tail wheels and later on, swiveling wheels. Skis were also available, although open cockpit flying in the winter could be a challenge. Rudder pedals were introduced which allowed side slipping of the aircraft as well as crosswind landings. The rudders could be coupled to the ailerons or de-coupled and controlled by the pedals in flight through a mixer gear.

Series III

The third series of the single-seat Lazair introduced customer-requested upgrades, such as:

- landing gear widened to 46 inches (1,200 mm)
- jury struts for increased negative-g tolerance
- conventional floor-mounted control stick
- toe brakes

Power on the Series III is still provided by two 9.5 horsepower (7.1 kW) Rotax 185 engines with the option of a pair of KFM 25 hp (19 kW) or JPX PUL 425 26 hp (19 kW) engines.

Elite

The Lazair Elite is a limited production aircraft that includes a structurally strengthened airframe using the Lazair II wings and an optional an enclosed cockpit. It is suitable for heavier pilots.

Lazair II

The Lazair II is a two-seater trainer with the seats in side-by-side configuration. It was introduced in 1983 and approximately 50 Lazair II kits were sold.

The Lazair II is powered by two JPX PUL 425 engines producing 26 hp (19 kW) each. The engines are more widely spaced than on the single-seater models which gives it different single engine handling characteristics.

Lazair SS EC

The "SS" is the "Surveillance Special" which was designed for police use, which included the Elite airframe and the 5KFM 25 hp (19 kW) engines also used on the two-seat Lazair II.

The only Lazair SS EC aircraft ever produced was employed by the Monterey Park Police Department in California. and was used for surveillance during the 1984 Olympics that were held in Los Angeles.

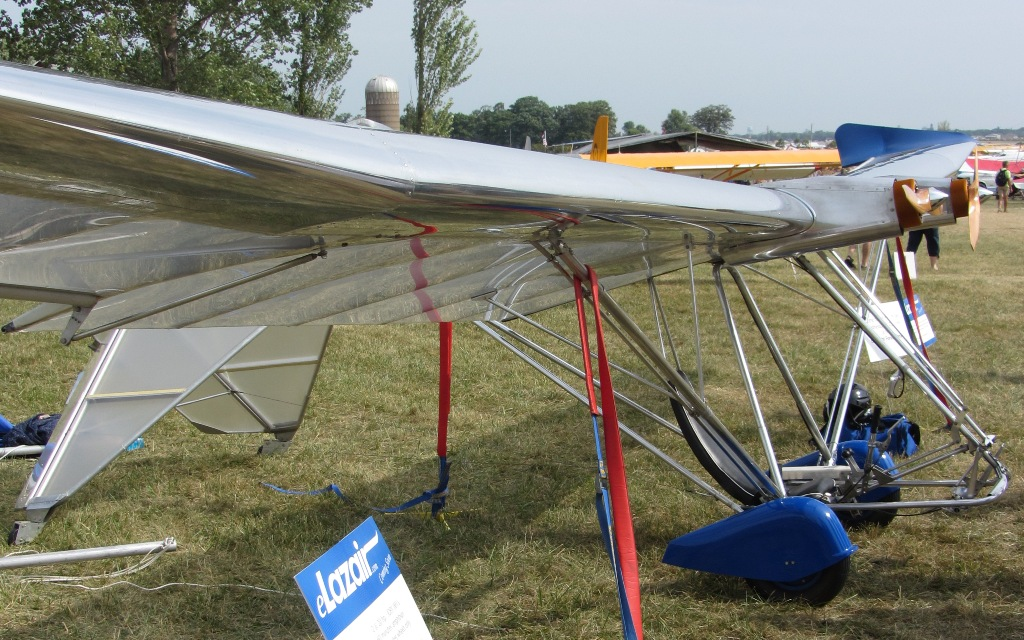
ELazair

Electric Lazair (eLazair)

In 2011 Lazair designer Dale Kramer introduced an experimental electric-powered Lazair on an amphibious mono-float, with outrigger floats at AirVenture. The aircraft is powered by twin Joby JM1 powerplants with Jeti SPIN Pro 300 controllers and dual 16 cell 4 amp-hour battery packs that produce 63 volts, mounted in the wings. The aircraft won Antique Ultralight Champion and Best Ultralight Amphibian at AirVenture. The aircraft is an experimental project and no production is planned.

The Lazair inspired many other aircraft designers to use the Lazair wing construction techniques. The Blue Yonder Merlin is one aircraft that uses a wing based on the Lazair wing.

== Regulatory status ==
In Canada all Lazairs are classified as Basic Ultra-lights. A multi-engine rating is not required to fly the Lazair in Canada as there is no multi-engine rating for ultra-light aeroplanes.

In the USA the single-seat models are flown as ultralights under FAR 103, whereas the Lazair II two-seat models are usually registered as experimental amateur-builts.

== Aircraft on display ==
- Lazair SS EC at the Steven F. Udvar-Hazy Center, National Air and Space Museum, Washington Dulles International Airport

== Specifications (Lazair Series II) ==
General characteristics

- Crew: one pilot
- Capacity: 240 lb (109 kg) useful load
- Length: 13 ft 0 in (3.96 m)
- Wingspan: 36 ft 4 in (11.1 m)
- Height: 6 ft 4 in (1.92 m)
- Wing area: 143 sq ft (13.3 m^{2})
- Airfoil: Custom Lazair airfoil, reflexed top and bottom
- Empty weight: 210 lb (95 kg)
- Max takeoff weight: 450 lb (204 kg)
- Powerplant: 2 × Rotax 185 , 9.5 hp (7.1 kW) each

Performance

- Maximum speed: 55 mph (89 km/h, 48 kn)
- Cruise speed: 40 mph (65 km/h, 35 kn)
- Stall speed: 17 mph (28 km/h, 15 kn)
- Never exceed speed: 60 mph (97 km/h, 52 kn)
- Range: 135 mi (217 km, 117 nmi)
- Service ceiling: 11,000 ft (3,350 m)
- Rate of climb: 200 ft/min (1.0 m/s)
- Wing loading: 3.14 lb/sq ft (15.4 kg/m^{2})
- Power/mass: 23.7 lb/hp (0.069 kW/kg)

== See also ==
Aircraft of comparable role, configuration, and era

- American Aerolights Double Eagle
- AmEagle American Eaglet
- Avid Champion
- Beaujon Enduro
- Beaujon Mach .07
- Birdman TL-1
- Blue Yonder EZ Fun Flyer
- Chotia Gypsy
- Chotia Weedhopper
- Eipper Quicksilver
- Gemini Hummingbird
- Jean St-Germain Raz-Mut
- Kolb Flyer
- Milholland Legal Eagle
- Mitchell U-2 Superwing
- Pterodactyl Ascender
- US Aviation Super Floater
- Wolford-Wilson Sailwing
- Zenair Zipper
