= Eipper Quicksilver =

American ultralight aircraft

Quicksilver Ultralight Aircraft
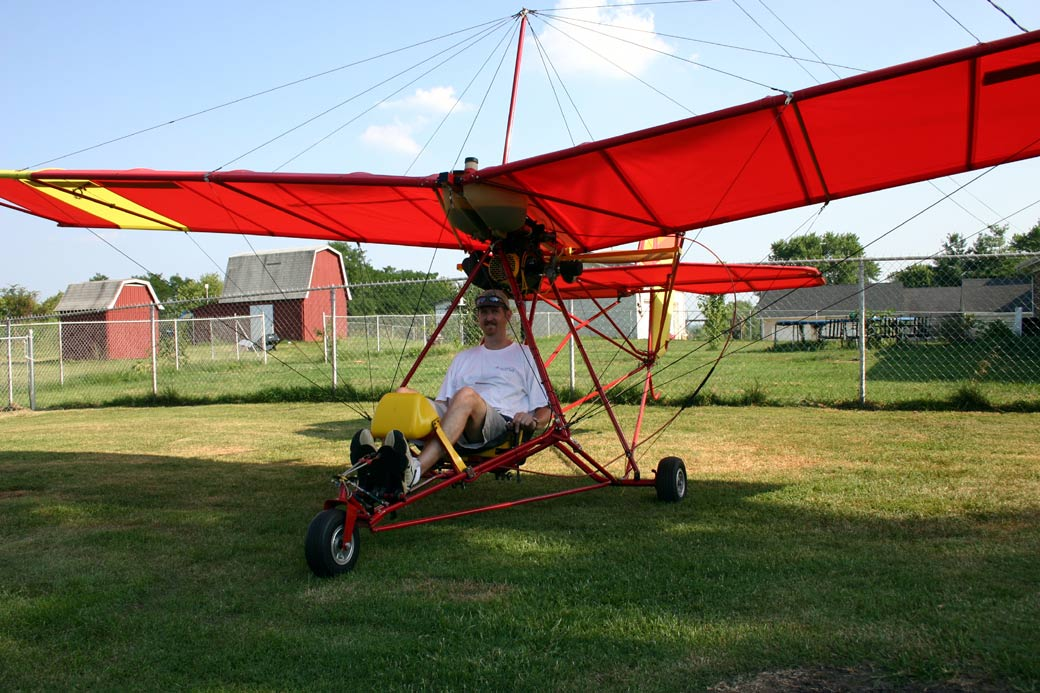
- Quicksilver MX

General information
- Type: Ultralight aircraft
- National origin: United States
- Manufacturer: Eipper Formance; Eipper Aircraft; Quicksilver Aircraft
- Designer: Bob Lovejoy
- Status: In production (2026)

History
- Developed from: Quicksilver hang glider
- Variants: M-Squared Breese; Ultralight Engineering Astra; Ultralite Soaring Wizard

Quicksilver is a line of single and two-place high wing, single-engine, ultralight aircraft that evolved from weight-shift hang gliders including Bob Lovejoy's High Tailer.

The earliest powered version, the Quicksilver C, was created as a self-launching hang glider, designed to allow pilots who lived in the flatlands to be able to self-launch without a hill. The design later evolved into an ultralight aircraft for powered cross-country flying.

The aircraft line has been in production since the late 1970s. Production at the Quicksilver Aircraft factory of Temecula, California ceased in 2015. All remaining assets and inventory were sold to Air-Tech, Inc of Reserve Louisiana who now supports the Quicksilver line.

== Design and development ==
Founded by Dick Eipper, Eipper Formance began manufacturing the early Bob Lovejoy-designed Quicksilver ultralights in the late 1970s when hang gliding was very popular. The Quicksilver hang gliders differed from most hang gliders of that time period in that the Quicksilver had a rigid rectangular wing and a tail with a horizontal stabilizer and a rudder. At that time, the majority of hang gliders were simple Rogallo wing-type hang gliders.

Eipper added a seat, wheels, and a small engine behind the wing of the hang glider, and the Quicksilver ultralight was born. This aircraft was controlled by pushing a bar forwards and backwards, and side to side, in the same way that hang gliders are controlled. This shifted the center of gravity of the aircraft and allowed the pilot to control the plane. Many pilots wanted an aircraft that was controlled with a stick and rudder, similar to the way "typical" light airplanes are controlled, so Eipper added rudder and elevator control surfaces to the Quicksilver ultralight, giving it two axes of control. This aircraft was called the Quicksilver MX. The high dihedral of the wings caused the plane to bank when the aircraft was turned with the rudder, but there was no direct means of controlling the roll axis of the airplane—the aircraft only rolled in response to the yaw axis. Pilots still wanted a true three-axis control ultralight, so Eipper added spoilerons. The spoilerons were only minimally effective, providing only a minimal amount of control over the roll axis. The next generation of MX had true ailerons which gave the aircraft full roll authority.

The single-seat Quicksilver MX not only complies with the US FAR 103 Ultralight Vehicles rules, but was in fact the aircraft around which the rules were developed. The Quicksilver was the most popular ultralight aircraft design when the regulations were first drafted in the early 1980s.

The Quicksilver MX evolved over the years. A two-seat model was added for training purposes, although the two-seater was not legally an ultralight. Eipper Formance changed their name to Eipper Aircraft and then Quicksilver Aircraft, and they are still in business, although they are not producing aircraft in the quantity that they were at the height of the ultralight craze in the mid-1980s.

The current production MX Sports and Sprints are built from anodized aluminum tubing that is fastened together with bolts. The wings and tail are covered with pre-sewn Dacron envelopes. Reported construction times from the kit are 30–40 hours.

== Operational history ==
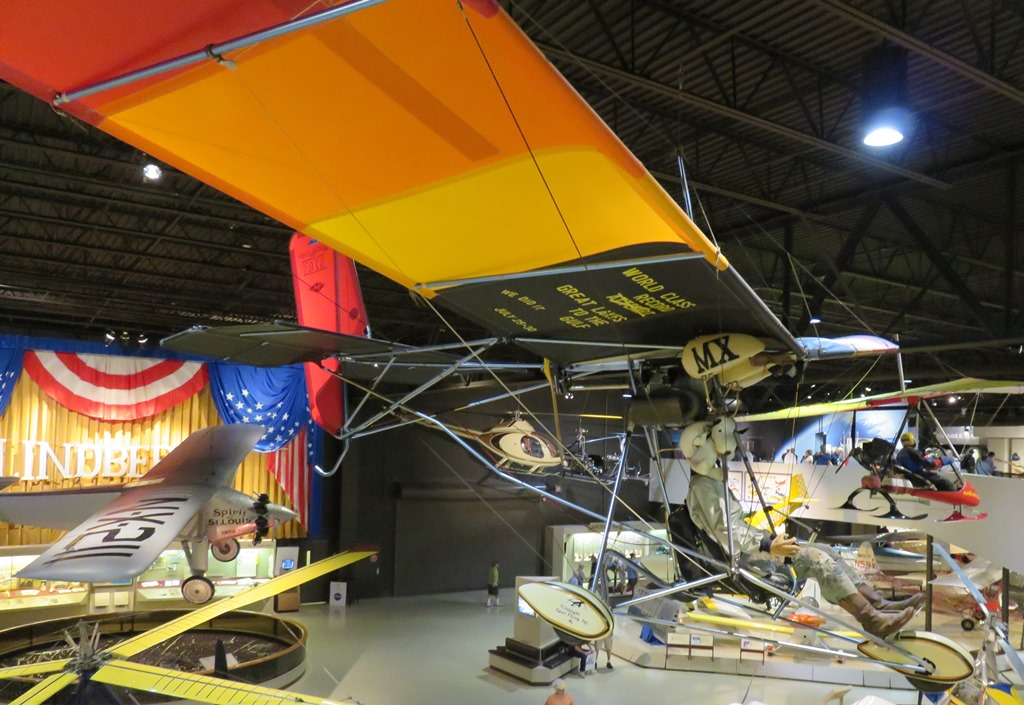
Peter Burgher's Quicksilver MX-1

In the summer of 1982, Peter Burgher modified a Quicksilver MX-1 with longer wings, larger fuel tanks, and modified carburetor jets flew from Utica, Michigan to St. Petersburg, Florida on an endurance flight setting 56 world and national records.

== Variants ==
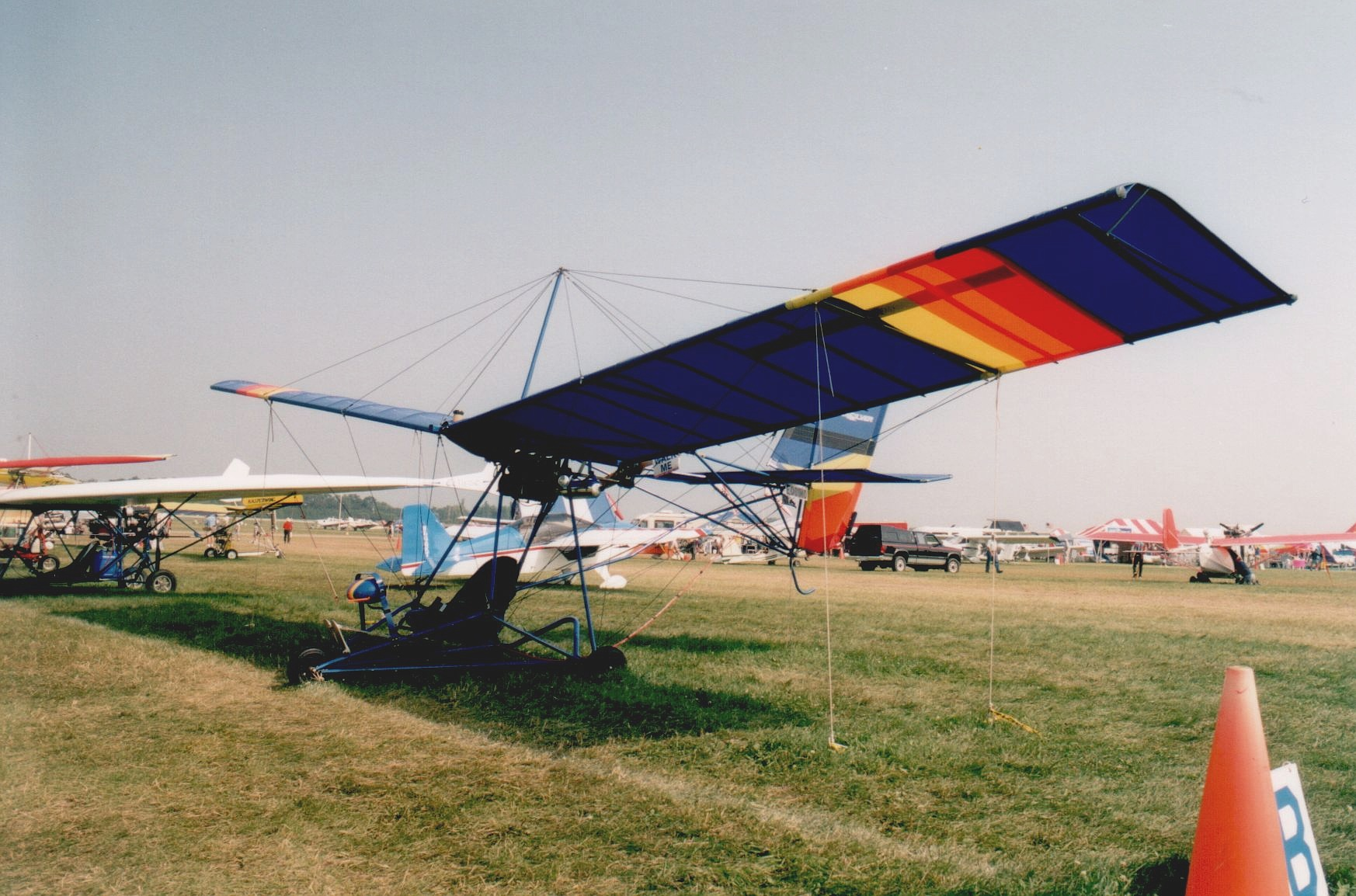
Quicksilver MX

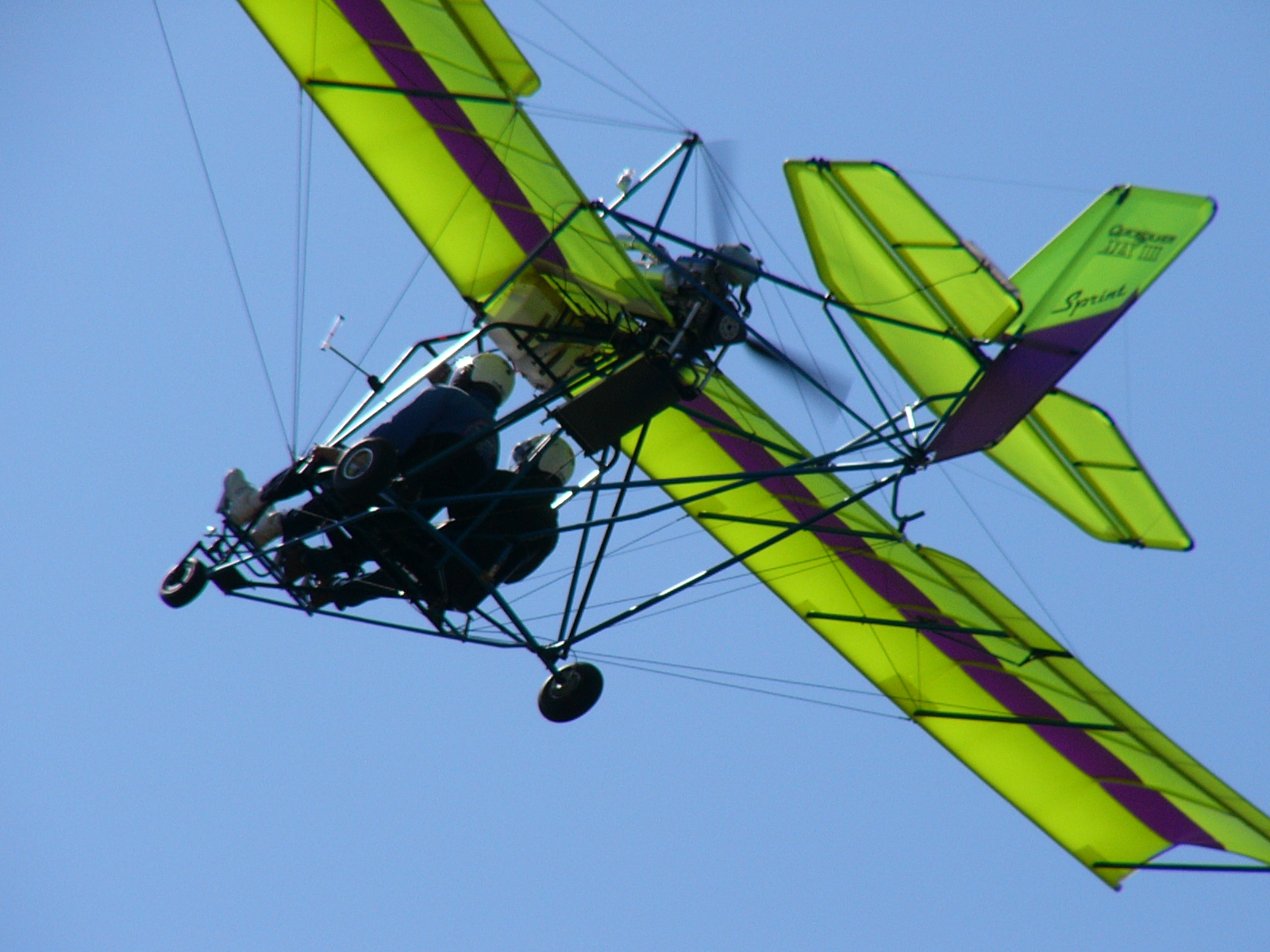
Quicksilver MX II Sprint two seater

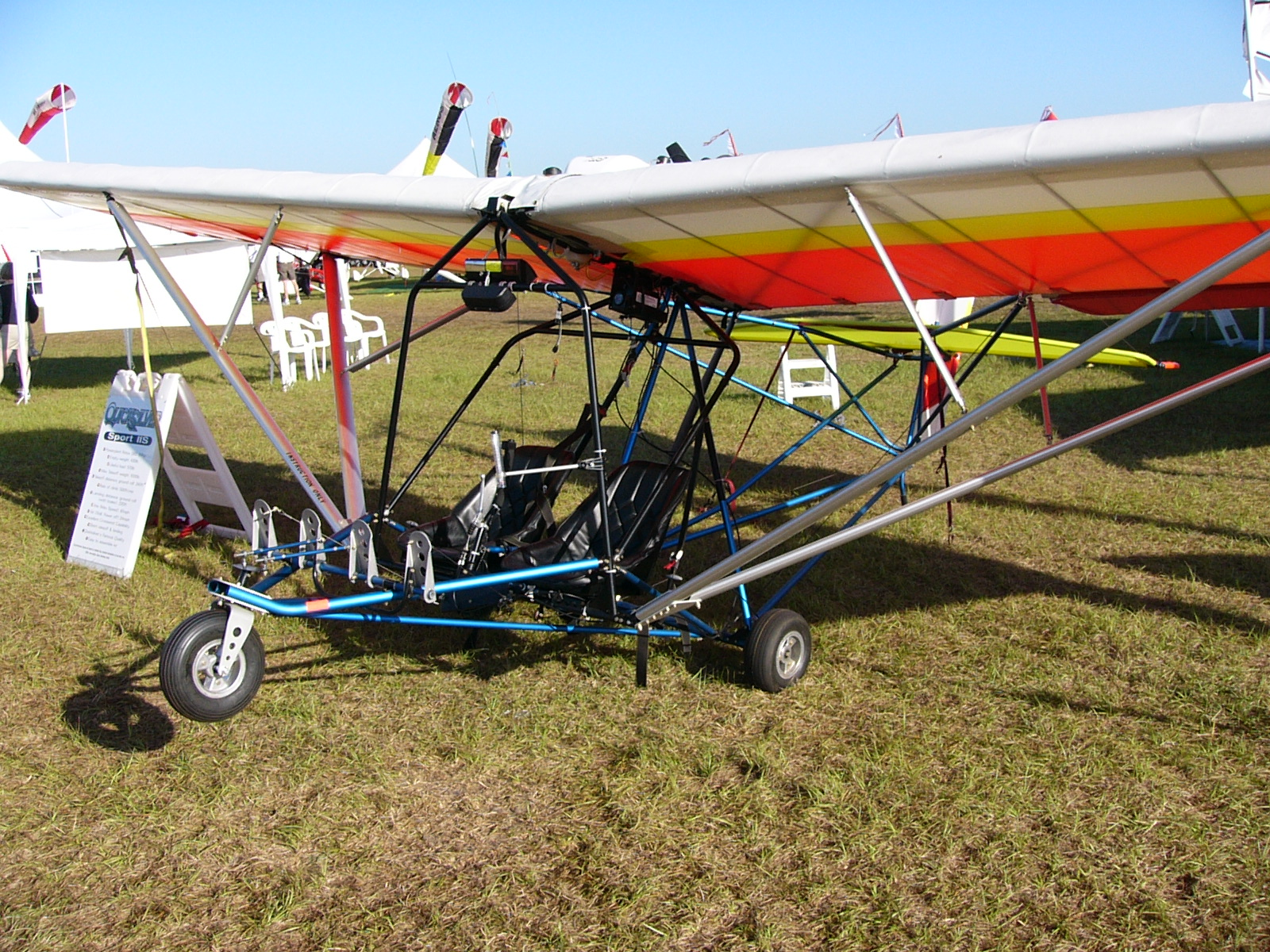
Quicksilver Sport 2S, showing its struts, in place of wire bracing

Quicksilver C
The C model was the earliest powered version and consisted of the Quicksilver hang glider, including the weight-shift sling seat, with a McCulloch MAC 101 powerplant of 12 hp (9 kW), a V-belt reduction drive and a 1.7 US gal (6 L) fuel tank. The rudder is deflected by movement of the sling seat to create a coordinated turn. The engine is mounted in pusher configuration at the trailing edge of the wing. There is no landing gear and the aircraft is foot-launched.
Quicksilver E
An evolution of the C design the E is a new design which incorporates tricycle landing gear, including a fixed, non-steerable nosewheel, but no brakes. Some E models have been flown on floats. The standard engine is a 20 hp (15 kW) Cuyuna 215R or a Yamaha go-cart engine. The E maintains the use of a weight-shift sling seat acting on the rudder, although it also acts on the elevator through a servo tab attached to the seat to boost weight-shift control authority.
Quicksilver MX Sprint
The Sprint is an evolution of the E model, with a fixed seat and three-axis controls and a steerable nosewheel. The Sprint features a cable-braced single surface wing and 2/3 span ailerons. The standard engine is the 40 hp (30 kW) Rotax 447 which gives a cruise speed of 50 mph (80 km/h).
Quicksilver MX Sport
The Sport is an evolution of the Sprint, with the addition of a double-surface wing. The standard engine is the 40 hp (30 kW) Rotax 447 which, combined with the double surface wing, gives a cruise speed of 53 mph (85 km/h).
Quicksilver MX-2 Sprint
The MX-2 Sprint is a two-seat in side-by-side configuration ultralight trainer that features a cable-braced single surface wing. The standard engine is the 50 hp (37 kW) Rotax 503 which gives a cruise speed of 51 mph (82 km/h). The Rotax 582 engine of 64 hp (48 kW) is optional.
Quicksilver MXL-2 Sport
The MXL-2 Sport is a two-seat in side-by-side configuration ultralight trainer that features a cable-braced double surface wing. The standard engine is the 50 hp (37 kW) Rotax 503 which, combined with the double surface wing, gives a cruise speed of 54 mph (87 km/h). The Rotax 582 engine of 64 hp (48 kW) is optional.
Quicksilver Sport II
The Sport II is a two-seat in side-by-side configuration ultralight trainer that features a strut-braced double surface wing. The standard engine is the 50 hp (37 kW) Rotax 503 which, combined with the double surface wing, gives a cruise speed of 54 mph (87 km/h). The Rotax 582 engine of 64 hp (48 kW) is optional.
Quicksilver Sport 2S
Updated and developed version of the Sport II with a wider tailboom, 68" propeller, increased gross weight and the Rotax 582 engine of 64 hp (48 kW) as standard.
Quicksilver Sport 2SE
Version for the US light-sport aircraft category, introduced in 2014, with the Rotax 582 64 hp (48 kW) engine. The model is a Federal Aviation Administration approved special light-sport aircraft.

== Specifications (Quicksilver MX Sport) ==
Data from Quicksilver Ultralight.com

General characteristics

- Crew: one
- Length: 18 ft 1 in (5.51 m)
- Wingspan: 28 ft 0 in (8.53 m)
- Height: 8 ft 10 in (2.69 m)
- Wing area: 156 sq ft (14.5 m^{2})
- Empty weight: 250 lb (113 kg)
- Gross weight: 525 lb (238 kg)
- Fuel capacity: 5 US gallons (19 litres)
- Powerplant: 1 × Rotax 447 , 40 hp (30 kW)

Performance

- Maximum speed: 54 mph (87 km/h, 47 kn)
- Cruise speed: 50 mph (80 km/h, 43 kn)
- Stall speed: 24 mph (39 km/h, 21 kn)
- Never exceed speed: 65 mph (105 km/h, 56 kn)
- Service ceiling: 14,000 ft (4,300 m)
- Rate of climb: 900 ft/min (4.6 m/s)

Avionics

- none

== Comparable aircraft ==
- AmEagle American Eaglet
- Avid Champion
- Birdman TL-1
- Chotia Weedhopper
- Kolb Flyer
- Milholland Legal Eagle
- Mitchell U-2 Superwing
- Pterodactyl Ascender
- UFM Easy Riser
- Ultraflight Lazair
- Zenair Zipper

== Bibliography ==
- Cliche, Andre: Ultralight Aircraft Shopper's Guide 8th Edition. Cybair Limited Publishing, 2001. ISBN 0-9680628-1-4
