= American Eaglet =

American Eaglet may refer to:

- American Eagle Eaglet, a 1930 two-seat, low-cost monoplane
- AmEagle American Eaglet, a 1975 single-seat, ultralight sailplane
