= Ed Sweeney =

Ed Sweeney may refer to:

- Ed Sweeney (baseball) (1888–1947), American Major League Baseball player
- Ed Sweeney (American football) (1949–2017), American college football head coach
- Ed Sweeney (trade unionist) (born 1954), British former trade union leader
- Ed Sweeney, inventor of the Aerocar 2000 and Gemini Hummingbird
