= Ultrastar =

Ultrastar may refer to:

- Western Digital brand of enterprise class hard disk drives and solid state drives
- Kolb Ultrastar ultralight aircraft
- Star Ultrastar, a pistol
- Ultimate sport's official flying disc
- UltraStar, a music video game
- UltraStar Cinemas, a movie theater chain.
