= Gemini Hummingbird =

Hummingbird

General information
- Type: Ultralight aircraft
- National origin: United States
- Manufacturer: Gemini International
- Designer: Ed Sweeney
- Status: Production completed
- Number built: 48 (1981)

History
- Introduction date: 1980
- First flight: 1979

The Gemini Hummingbird is a family of American single-seat, twin-engined ultralight aircraft. Designed in 1979 and introduced in 1980, the Hummingbird was created by Ed Sweeney and produced by Gemini International. The aircraft was supplied either assembled and ready to fly, or as a kit for amateur construction.

== Design and development ==
The aircraft was designed before the US FAR 103 Ultralight Vehicles rules, but later versions were intended to specifically fit the category. The Hummingbird features a high wing, a V-tail, an open cockpit, tricycle landing gear and twin, wing-mounted engines in tractor configuration.

The aircraft is made from aluminum tubing, with its flying surfaces covered in Dacron sailcloth. Its 70% double-surface, 36 ft (11.0 m) span wing is cable-braced from an inverted "V" kingpost on early models and is strut-braced on later versions. The pilot is accommodated in a web sling seat that allows for foot-launching, an unwritten requirement for ultralights in the USA prior to FAR 103. The controls are three-axis, but on the Sport model, the control stick activates all surfaces, including the ruddervators. The later 103 model introduced rudder pedals. The landing gear lacks suspension, but features nosewheel steering. Both models had structurally sound designs, and could maintain altitude on one engine. The more powerful Prospector engine equipped models are able to climb on one engine.

The 103 models were able to fold completely flat for easy transport or storage. They were designed to be transported on top of a car and required two people to set up.

In 2009, Sweeney was experimenting with electric motors on one of his Hummingbirds, but no test flights were conducted.

== Variants ==
Hummingbird Sport
Single-seat cable-braced model, powered by two 8 hp (6 kW) single-cylinder Husqvarna AB Partner chainsaw engines with reduction drives installed or, later, two twin-cylinder Limbach Flugmotoren engines. The Sport has an empty weight of 170 lb (77 kg) and a gross weight of 326 lb (148 kg).
Hummingbird 103
Improved, strut-braced single-seat model for FAR 103 rules, powered by two Solo 335 engines of 20 hp (15 kW). Was capable of folding flat for transport or storage.
Hummingbird 2
Two-seat model, with a structurally stronger airframe. It was considered a Light-Sport Aircraft instead of an ultralight, because it had two seats. Only one prototype was ever produced.

== Specifications (Hummingbird 103) ==
Data from Cliche

General characteristics

- Crew: one
- Wingspan: 36 ft (11 m)
- Wing area: 175 sq ft (16.3 m^{2})
- Empty weight: 240 lb (109 kg)
- Gross weight: 560 lb (254 kg)
- Fuel capacity: 4.4 U.S. gallons (17 L; 3.7 imp gal)
- Powerplant: 2 × Solo 335 , 20 hp (15 kW) each

Performance

- Cruise speed: 57 mph (92 km/h, 50 kn)
- Stall speed: 22 mph (35 km/h, 19 kn)
- Range: 100 mi (160 km, 87 nmi)
- g limits: +4.5/-3.5
- Maximum glide ratio: 11:1
- Rate of climb: 941 ft/min (4.78 m/s)

== See also ==
Aircraft of comparable role, configuration, and era

- Ultraflight Lazair
- Kolb Flyer
