= GT500 =

GT500 may refer to:

- GT500, the top class of Super GT, the top-level sports car racing series in Japan
- GT500 model of the Shelby Mustang, a variant of the Ford Mustang
- Quicksilver GT500, an American ultralight kit aircraft
