= Quicksilver Aircraft =

Aircraft manufacturer

- Industry: Aerospace manufacturer
- Founded: 1972
- Founder: Dick Eipper
- Headquarters: Temecula, California, United States of America
- Key people: Dan Perez (COO)
- Products: Kit aircraft
- Website: quicksilveraircraft.com

Quicksilver Aircraft is an American manufacturer of ultralight and light aircraft. Founded in 1972 as Eipper Formance and later Eipper Aircraft, the company today claims to be the leading manufacturer of ultralight aircraft in the United States, with the Quicksilver type ultralight being used to train more ultralight pilots than any other type.

The company was previously known as Quicksilver Manufacturing Inc.

In 2015 the owners dissolved Quicksilver Aeronautics and closed the Temecula factory after a prolonged downturn in sales, while retaining the intellectual property and arranging for parts and support to be supplied through long-time distributors such as Air-Tech Inc.

== History ==
Quicksilver was founded in Eipper Formance, a hang glider manufacturer established by Dick Eipper in Southern California in the early 1970s. Eipper Formance produced both flexible-wing and rigid-wing hang gliders, including Bob Lovejoy's Quicksilver rigid-wing design, which used a rectangular wing and conventional tail surfaces rather than a delta wing.

In the late 1970s the company began experimenting with adding engines and landing gear to the Quicksilver glider, creating the Quicksilver C as a self-launching powered glider aimed at pilots flying from flat terrain. Subsequent versions introduced tricycle landing gear and progressively more conventional aerodynamic controls, leading to the Quicksilver E and then the MX series, which replaced pure weight-shift control with two- and three-axis control surfaces.

Eipper Formance was renamed Eipper Aircraft and later Quicksilver Aircraft. Under later ownership the firm traded as Quicksilver Manufacturing Inc., headquartered in Temecula, California, and offered a seven-model line-up that included Sprint and Sport trainers and the more enclosed GT series.

Quicksilver's GT400 and GT500 models, introduced in the mid-1980s and early 1990s, were designed as higher-performance aircraft with podded or enclosed cockpits. The GT500 became the first aircraft to be certificated by the Federal Aviation Administration in the Primary Category for sportplanes in 1993.

In the 2010s the company developed the Sport 2SE, a fully built, two-seat Special Light-Sport Aircraft (S-LSA) derived from the open-cockpit Sport 2S. The Sport 2SE received S-LSA approval in 2014 and has been marketed as a trainer and rental aircraft.

In October 2015 Quicksilver announced a major reorganisation and closed its Temecula factory after a difficult financial year, with management citing falling sales and the need to liquidate assets.

Later that month the owners opted to dissolve Quicksilver Aeronautics, the then-current corporate entity, while retaining the intellectual property and arranging for long-time dealer Air-Tech Inc. of Reserve, Louisiana, and other suppliers to provide parts and potential future kits.

An official statement issued on behalf of Flying Spirit Aircraft, the rights-holding company, indicated that factory support for existing aircraft and replacement parts would continue through third-party companies and that new kits might be offered depending on demand.

Previous logo as Quicksilver Manufacturing

== Aircraft ==
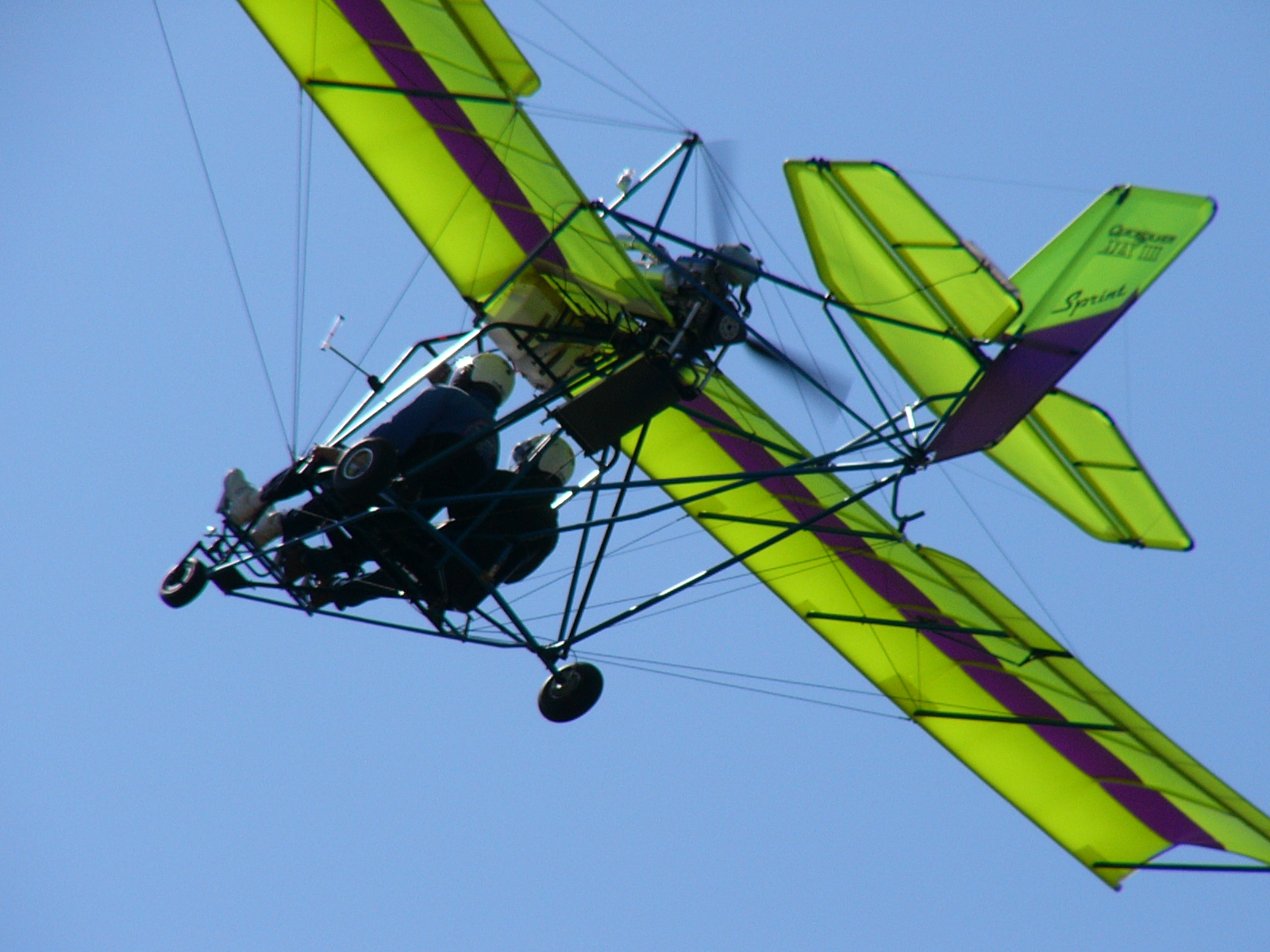
Quicksilver MX II Sprint two seater

- GT400
- GT500
- MX Sprint
- MX Sport
- MX-2 Sprint
- MXL-2 Sport
- Quicksilver C
- Quicksilver E
- Sport II
- Sport 2S
