= Wolford-Wilson Sailwing =

Sailwing

General information
- Type: Homebuilt aircraft
- National origin: United States
- Designer: Dale Wolford, Elmer Wilson

History
- Developed from: Princeton Sailwing

The Wolford-Wilson Sailwing is an American single place homebuilt aircraft.

== Design and development ==
The Sailwing is a single place, open cockpit, twin engine pusher with an inverted V-tail and conventional landing gear. The aircraft uses an aluminum leading edge with wire support and Dacron covering, rather than a spar. Roll control is performed with wing-warping.

== Specifications (Sailwing) ==
Data from Air Progress

General characteristics

- Crew: one
- Powerplant: 2 × Westbend , 10 hp (7.5 kW) each

Performance

- Cruise speed: 39 kn (45 mph, 72 km/h)

== See also ==
Aircraft of comparable role, configuration, and era

- Ultraflight Lazair
