= Rotax 185 =

Austrian two-stroke aircraft engine

185
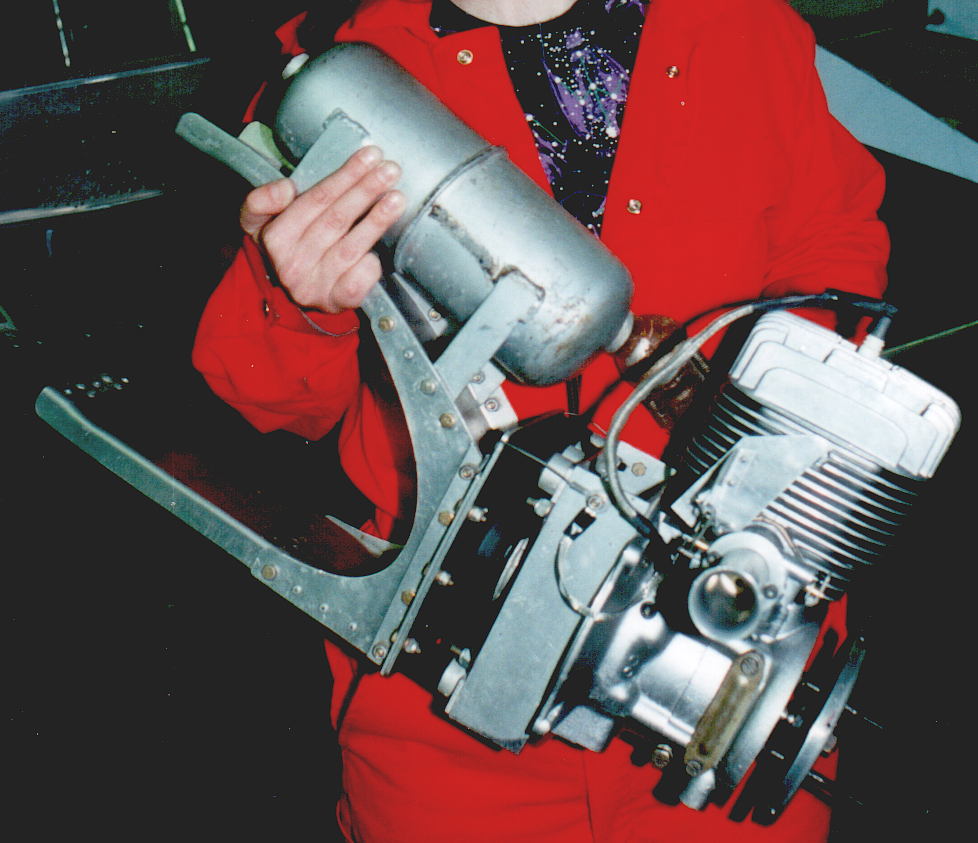
- Rotax 185 with Lazair aircraft mount and muffler installed
- Type: Piston aero-engine
- National origin: Austria
- Manufacturer: Rotax
- Major applications: Ultraflight Lazair

The Rotax 185 is a 9 hp (7 kW), single cylinder, two-stroke, direct drive, industrial engine, built by Rotax of Austria for use in fire fighting water pumps that has also been adapted as an aircraft engine for use in ultralight aircraft.

== Development ==
The Rotax 185 was designed as a fire-fighting pump, but the rights to the design were sold by Rotax to the Wildfire Group who use the engine in their Mark 3 High Pressure Centrifugal Fire Pump.

Due to its design purpose as a water pump engine it proved reliable enough for use on ultralight aircraft, and was adopted as an engine for the twin-engine Ultraflight Lazair ultralight aircraft - as a replacement for the 5.5 hp (4 kW) Pioneer chainsaw engines used on the early Series I. The 185 provides enough power to allow the Lazair to be flown on floats.

In the Lazair application the 185 was used to drive two propellers stacked together in biplane configuration. This was not done for aerodynamic reasons but rather because the Lazair manufacturer had ample quantities of the nylon propellers on hand for its earlier engines and stacking them was more cost efficient than scrapping them and buying new propellers.

== Applications ==
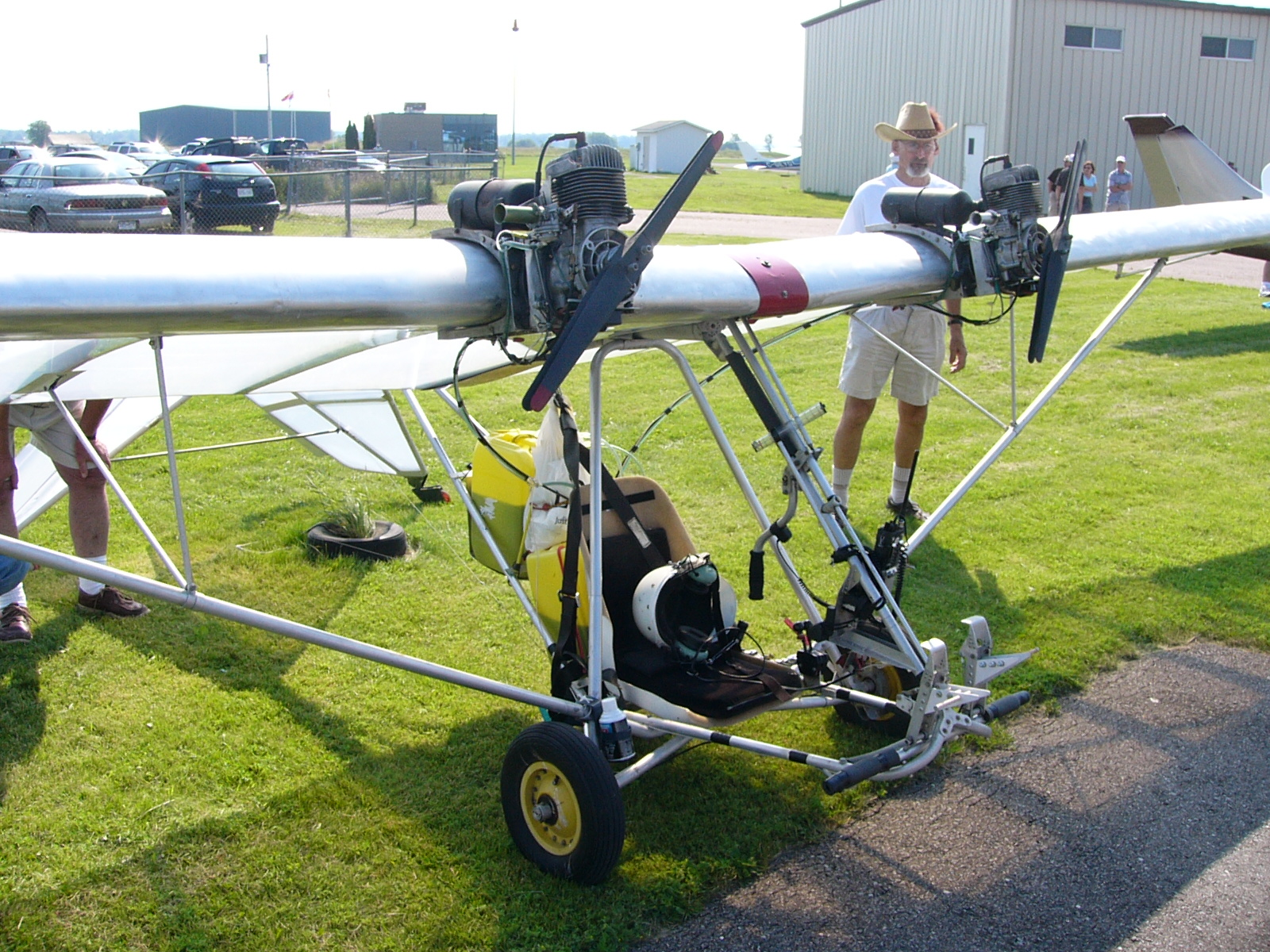
A Lazair with two Rotax 185s installed, powering biplane propellers

- Lazair
- Wildfire Mark-3 High Pressure Centrifugal Fire Pump

== Specifications (185) ==
Data from Rotax 185 Engine Data

=== General characteristics ===
- Type: two-stroke air-cooled engine
- Bore: 2.441 in (62 mm)
- Stroke: 2.4 in (61 mm)
- Displacement: 185 cc (11.29 cu in)

=== Components ===
- Valvetrain: piston ports
- Fuel system: Tillotson pneumatic pump carburettor
- Fuel type: regular autofuel
- Oil system: premixed in the fuel at 40:1
- Cooling system: free air
- Reduction gear: Custom made belt drive reduction units have been employed

=== Performance ===
- Power output: 9 hp (7 kW) at 5000 rpm
- Fuel consumption: 4 L/hr (1 US gph)
