= Birdman Aircraft =

Birdman Aircraft was a U.S. aircraft manufacturer that marketed the Birdman TL-1 ultralight in the 1970s and early 1980s, at the time, the lightest aircraft to have ever flown. The firm was based at the Daytona Beach International Airport in Florida.
