= Latécoère 225 =

General information
- Type: Microlight amphibious flying boat
- National origin: France
- Manufacturer: Latécoère (La societe industrielle d'aviation Latécoère, SILAT)
- Designer: Nono Larsen
- Number built: 1

History
- First flight: 18 July 1984

The Latécoère 225 was an unusual single seat canard microlight amphibian, with a swept wing, and of pusher configuration. It first flew in 1984 but was not put into production.

== Design and development ==
Before World War II Latécoère was a prolific aircraft manufacturer, particularly known for large flying boats. Post-war they produced many projects but no new designs were built and flown for almost 40 years. By the mid-1950s they had diversified, with a wide range of technical products, many with their own Latécoère type number. Some of these numbers duplicated those of earlier aircraft, for example the Latécoère 300 was an early 1930s flying boat but a 1960s high voltage circuit breaker. Just one of their diversifications produced an aircraft; the Latécoère 225 ultralight shares its number with a post-war four engine bomber project.

The Latécoère 225, or Latécoère Laté 225 is an unusual aircraft in many ways, a low powered, single seat microlight amphibian of swept wing, canard, pusher, pod and boom configuration. Design was under way by 1983 and the unflown aircraft appeared at the Hanover and Cannes airshows of 1984. The first flight followed that July.

The Laté 225's airframe is of composite construction. Its high wing is swept at 13° and has constant chord. There are long chord end plate fins on the wing tips, rounded at the front but increasing in depth and with a vertical trailing edge that projects aft of the wing. The lower trailing edge of these fins is diagonally hinged to provide roll control. The wing is mounted on a boom which mounts the pusher engine at its rear end and reaches forward beyond the nose, where it carries an unswept, rectangular canard. This has an elevator for pitch control.

The flat sided pod fuselage is attached to the underside of the boom, with a glazed, single seat cabin forming the blunt nose. An inset rudder at the rear provides roll control. A single lift strut on each side braces the wing to the mid-lower fuselage. The underside of the pod is formed into a single step hull, equipped with a water rudder. The Laté 225 has an unusual tricycle undercarriage; the nosewheel retracts conventionally but the mainwheels, housed in fairings and fuselage mounted on cantilever legs, hinge upwards for landings on water, when they act as lateral stabilisers.

The Laté 225 was originally powered by an 18 kW, (24 hp) flat-twin two stroke engine but this was soon replaced by a 20 kW (30 hp) KFM 107er. It was undergoing tests in early 1985 but its subsequent career was either short or mostly unrecorded. At some point the design was acquired by SERLAG, who renamed it the SERLAG 225EX.

== Aircraft on display ==
The Latécoère 225 prototype F-WZLM, renamed as the SERLEG 225EX, is on display at the Musée Historique de l'Hydraviation at Biscarrosse, once Latécoère's seaplane base.

== Specifications ==
Data from Ultralight and Microlight Aircraft of the World, Jane's All the World's Aircraft 1985/6

General characteristics

- Crew: 1
- Length: 4.95 m (16 ft 3 in)
- Wingspan: 8.03 m (26 ft 4 in) Canard span 2.90 m (9 ft 6 in)
- Height: 2.15 m (7 ft 1 in)
- Wing area: 11.85 m^{2} (127.6 sq ft) wing alone; canard area 1.85 m² (20 sq ft)
- Aspect ratio: 5.4
- Empty weight: 127 kg (280 lb)
- Max takeoff weight: 258 kg (569 lb)
- Fuel capacity: 23 L (6.1 US gal; 5.1 Imp gal)
- Powerplant: 1 × JPX PUL 425 twin cylinder, horizontally opposed, air-cooled two-stroke, 18 kW (24 hp) at 4,500 rpm
- Propellers: 2-bladed

Performance

- Maximum speed: 120 km/h (75 mph, 65 kn)
- Cruise speed: 85 km/h (53 mph, 46 kn) economic
- Stall speed: 45 km/h (28 mph, 24 kn)
- Rate of climb: 2.7 m/s (530 ft/min) maximum at sea level
- Wing loading: 18.8 kg/m^{2} (3.9 lb/sq ft) maximum
- Power/mass: 6.9 W/kg (0.042 hp/lb) maximum at MTOW
- Take-off distance on grass: 80 m (262 ft
- Take-off distance on water: 150 m (492 ft)
