= Beaujon Aircraft =

American aircraft design company

- Industry: Aerospace
- Headquarters: Ardmore, Oklahoma, United States
- Key people: Herbert Beaujon, CEO
- Products: Ultralight aircraft plans

Beaujon Aircraft, also known as Beaujon Ultralights, is an American aircraft design company, located in Ardmore, Oklahoma.

== History ==
Founded by Herbert Beaujon in the 1970s, Beaujon Aircraft has published the designs for eight ultralight aircraft and marketed seven of them in book form under the name How to Build Ultralights. The book and its plans have received praise from reviewers. Andre Cliche wrote:

“How to build ultralights". It is a very good document meant to guide the backyard designer in building his own design out of aluminum tubes. Apart from general performance calculations, stress analysis, and other general design requirements, it really shines in the detailed illustrations of aluminum tube building. It lacks in one area though: it does not show how to cover the craft with either sailcloth or dope & fabric.

Beaujon's designs have been described as "beautifully simple" and have been used to construct many flying examples.

Beaujon has made the plans for one of his earlier designs, the wooden winged, three-axis–control Enduro available for free download as 25 JPEGs.

== Aircraft ==
Summary of aircraft designed by Beaujon Aircraft
Model name	First flight	Number built	Type
BJ-2			Single seat pusher configuration aircraft
Enduro	1978		Single seat pusher configuration aircraft with wood-structure wing
Flybike			Single seat pusher aircraft.
Hardnose			Single seat tractor configuration aircraft
Mach .07			Single seat tractor configuration aircraft with two-axis control. Name indicates maximum speed.
Minimac			Single seat tractor configuration aircraft
Viewmaster			Single seat pusher aircraft, resembling a powered primary glider
Windward			Single seat pusher aircraft
