= JPX PUL 425 =

French aircraft engine

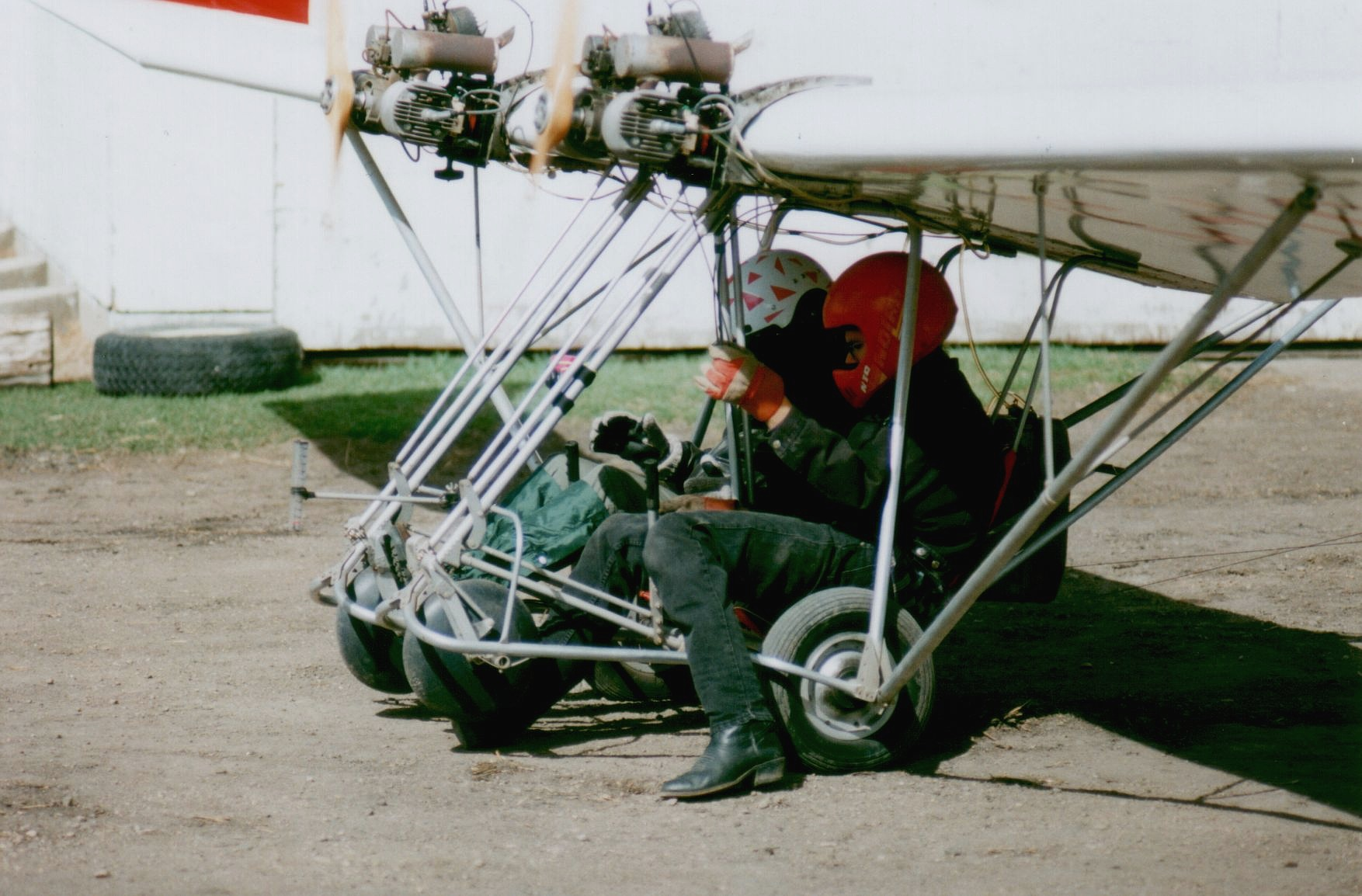
- Two JPX PUL 425s mounted on a Lazair 2
- Type: Two-cylinder two-stroke engine
- National origin: France
- Manufacturer: JPX
- Manufactured: until the early 1990s

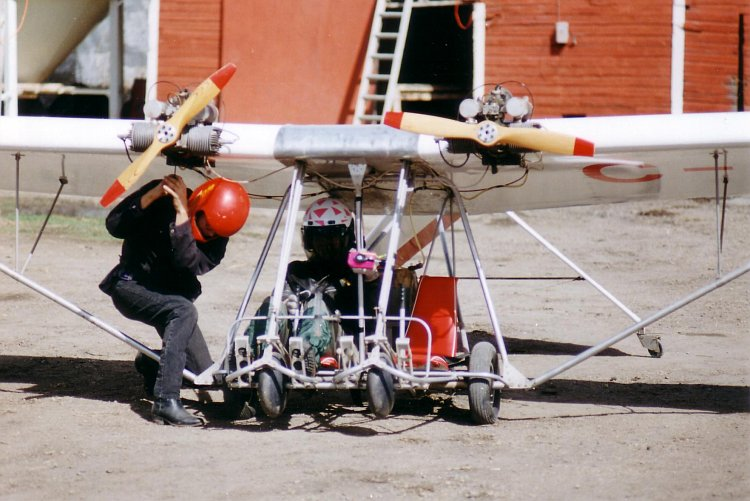
A Lazair II two-seat trainer has one of its JPX PUL 425 engines started. Lazairs generally do not have electrical systems and their engines are started by recoil start.

The JPX PUL 425, also called simply the JPX 425, is a French twin-cylinder, horizontally opposed, two-stroke aircraft engine.

The engine was produced only until the company went out of business in the early 1990s. The company was re-formed but the engine remains out of production and unsupported for parts.

== Design and development ==
The engine has two cylinders in a horizontally opposed configuration, with cooling fins on the cylinders. The single ignition system uses a coil and points. Fuel is metered by a single Tillotson butterfly-type carburetor. Starting is by a recoil starter system with electric start as an option.

The 425 has a redline rpm of 4600 and does not use a reduction drive. Its weight of just 38 lb (17 kg) gives the engine a high power-to-weight ratio.

== Applications ==
- Aurore MB 02 Souricette
- Latécoère 225
- Lazair 2
- Lazair SS
- Lazair Series III
- Snipe Diamond
- Zenair Zipper

== Specifications (425) ==
Data from Cliche

=== General characteristics ===
- Type: twin-cylinder, two-stroke engine
- Displacement: 424 cc (25.87 cu inches)
- Dry weight: 38 lb (17 kg)

=== Components ===
- Fuel system: Tillotson butterfly-type carburetor
- Oil system: premixed oil and fuel
- Cooling system: air cooled

=== Performance ===
- Power output: 26 hp (19 kW) at 4600 rpm

== See also ==
- Kawasaki 440
- Rotax 377
- Hirth F-263
- Hirth F-33
