= Stanton Sunbird =

New Zealand homebuilt motor glider

General information
- Type: motor glider
- National origin: New Zealand
- Manufacturer: Charles Stanton
- Status: Museum display
- Number built: 1

History
- First flight: 26 February 1995
- Retired: 16 April 2005

The Sunbird is a single-seater homebuilt motor glider, designed and built in New Zealand by Charles Stanton. It first flew in 1995, and was retired in 2005.

== Design and development ==
Charles Stanton of Nelson, New Zealand had previously built and flown an AmEagle American Eaglet motor glider, registration ZK-GOE (c/n AACA/641). That craft's registration was cancelled in 1992. Stanton then went on to design and build a motor glider, and utilised components from the American Eaglet. Construction took over three years, and was completed by early 1995.

The Sunbird was a self-launching motor glider. It was a high-wing monoplane of conventional configuration, with a pod-and-boom style of fuselage. The cantilevered wing had no dihedral and its planform was of constant chord with a tapered outer section. The pilot was housed in a small faired nacelle. The engine was located at the rear of the nacelle, and powered a two-bladed folding propeller. The engine was a 21 kW (28 hp) Rotax 277, which could be re-started in flight. The empennage was of the standard type arranged in a cruciform configuration. The undercarriage was a fixed monowheel fitted with a wheel spat. The Sunbird met the New Zealand specifications for Class 1 Microlights, and was issued with the registration ZK-JEA.

== Operational history ==
It first flew on 26 February 1995, with Stanton reportedly making numerous flights in it over the next ten years. On one flight, it reached an altitude of 4,000 m (13,000 ft). Another flight lasted for 3 1/2 hours. The craft's final flight took place on 16 April 2005. It was donated to the Ashburton Aviation Museum on 4 December 2005, during the Museum's Christmas Party.

== Specifications ==
Data from NZ Civil Aircraft

General characteristics

- Crew: one
- Wingspan: 12.80 m (42 ft 0 in)
- Wing area: 9.20 m^{2} (99.0 sq ft)
- Aspect ratio: 17.80
- Airfoil: Eppler 748 High Lift
- Empty weight: 142 kg (313 lb)
- Max takeoff weight: 239 kg (527 lb)
- Powerplant: 1 × Rotax 277 two stroke, 21 kW (28 hp)
- Propellers: 2-bladed

Performance

- Cruise speed: 90 km/h (56 mph, 49 kn)
- Stall speed: 51 km/h (32 mph, 28 kn)
- Never exceed speed: 132 km/h (82 mph, 71 kn)
- Service ceiling: 3,962 m (12,999 ft)
- g limits: ±4.4
- Wing loading: 26.0 kg/m^{2} (5.3 lb/sq ft)
