= Beaujon Mach .07 =

Mach .07

General information
- Type: Ultralight aircraft
- National origin: United States
- Manufacturer: Beaujon Aircraft
- Designer: Herbert Beaujon
- Status: Plans available

The Beaujon Mach .07 is a single-seat, American high-wing, tractor configuration ultralight aircraft. The aircraft is available as plans from Beaujon Aircraft of Ardmore, Oklahoma.

== Development ==
Designed by Herbert Beaujon, the Mach .07 is named for its top speed of 48 mph (77 km/h). Beaujon Aircraft publishes the plans along with six other designs in book form under the name How to Build Ultralights.

The Mach .07 was specifically designed to comply with the United States ultralight category and its FAR 103 Ultralight Vehicles rules, including the category's maximum 254 lb (115 kg) empty weight.

With the specified 50 lb (23 kg) 250 cc Zenoah G-25 22 hp (16 kW) powerplant the aircraft has an empty weight of 160 lb (73 kg).

Reviewer Andre Cliche says:

The Mach .07 is a beautifully simple ultralight which is reminiscent of the early designs that gave rise to the ultralight phenomenon in the late 70s.

== Design ==
The aircraft's wing and tail structure are built from aluminum and are covered in aircraft fabric. The wing is strut-braced. The Mach .07 uses no structural cables in its construction. The conventional landing gear features a steerable tail wheel attached to the rudder.

The controls are two-axis, with a side-stick that laterally activates the rudder to induce roll and which longitudinally activates the elevator for pitch control. No rudder pedals are installed and the wing construction is greatly simplified by the elimination of ailerons.

The open frame fuselage consists of 6061T6 aluminum tubing and a single open pilot's seat. The powerplant is installed at the front end of the aircraft tailboom tube, above the pilot. Standard fuel capacity is 2.5 US gal (9 L; 2 imp gal).

== Specifications (Mach .07) ==
Data from Cliche

General characteristics

- Crew: one
- Capacity: 240 lb (109 kg) useful load
- Empty weight: 160 lb (73 kg)
- Max takeoff weight: 400 lb (181 kg)
- Powerplant: 1 × Zenoah G-25 250 cc two-stroke fixed pitch, 22 hp (16 kW)

Performance

- Maximum speed: 48 mph (78 km/h, 42 kn)
- Cruise speed: 38 mph (62 km/h, 33 kn)
- Stall speed: 20 mph (32 km/h, 17 kn)
- Rate of climb: 350 ft/min (1.7 m/s)
- Power/mass: 18.2 lb/hp (0.09 kW/kg)

== See also ==
Aircraft of comparable role, configuration, and era

- Aero-Works Aerolite 103
- Avid Champion
- Chotia Gypsy
- Chotia Weedhopper
- Fisher FP-101
- Fisher FP-202 Koala
- ISON Airbike
- Pterodactyl Ascender
- Ultraflight Lazair
