= Kolb Flyer =

American homebuilt airplane

General information
- Type: Ultralight aircraft
- National origin: United States
- Manufacturer: Kolb Aircraft
- Designer: Homer Kolb
- Status: Production complete

History
- Manufactured: 1980-82
- Introduction date: 1980
- First flight: 1970

The Kolb Flyer is an American single seat, high wing, strut-braced, twin-engine, pusher configuration, conventional landing gear-equipped ultralight aircraft that was produced in kit form by Kolb Aircraft of Phoenixville, Pennsylvania, and intended for amateur construction.

The Flyer was the first design produced by Kolb Aircraft. Based on the Flyer's success, the company and its successor, New Kolb Aircraft, have gone on to produce over 3000 aircraft as of 2010.

== Design and development ==
The Flyer was a very early ultralight design that first flew in 1970. The first aircraft designed by Homer Kolb, it was ahead of its time and was not produced commercially until 1980, when the ultralight boom hit North America.

The Flyer is a very light and simple aircraft with a standard empty weight of only 185 lb (84 kg). It features a completely open cockpit with the pilot exposed to the slipstream. Unusually for this period in aircraft history when most ultralights had two-axis control, the Flyer has standard three-axis controls, including half span ailerons.

When the Flyer was designed there were no suitable lightweight engines available, so the prototype aircraft first fitted Chrysler powerplants. Later these were exchanged for Solo 209 engines producing 11.5 hp (9 kW) each. The small Solo engines make the Flyer a very quiet aircraft in flight.

The design features a forward fuselage of welded 4130 steel tubing, mated to an aluminum tailboom. The horizontal stabilizer, tail fin and wings are also constructed of riveted aluminum tubing with all flying surfaces covered in doped aircraft fabric.

The conventional landing gear consists of sprung steel tubing for the main gear, with a sprung tail skid.

The Flyer was later improved and developed into a single engine aircraft, the Kolb Ultrastar, which succeeded it in production in 1982.

== Specifications (Flyer) ==
Data from Cliche

General characteristics

- Crew: one
- Wingspan: 29 ft 0 in (8.84 m)
- Wing area: 160 sq ft (15 m^{2})
- Empty weight: 185 lb (84 kg)
- Gross weight: 392 lb (178 kg)
- Fuel capacity: 1.7 US gallons (6.5 litres)
- Powerplant: 2 × Solo 209 single cylinder, two-stroke engine, 11.5 hp (8.6 kW) each

Performance

- Cruise speed: 40 mph (64 km/h, 35 kn)
- Stall speed: 20 mph (32 km/h, 17 kn)
- Range: 35 mi (56 km, 30 nmi)
- Service ceiling: 6,850 ft (2,090 m)
- g limits: +4/-2.5
- Maximum glide ratio: 10.8:1 at 27 mph
- Rate of climb: 250 ft/min (1.3 m/s)

Avionics

- none

== See also ==
Related development

- Kolb Ultrastar

Aircraft of comparable role, configuration, and era

- Eipper Quicksilver
- Ultraflight Lazair
- Zenair Zipper
