= Rope start =

Manual engine starter

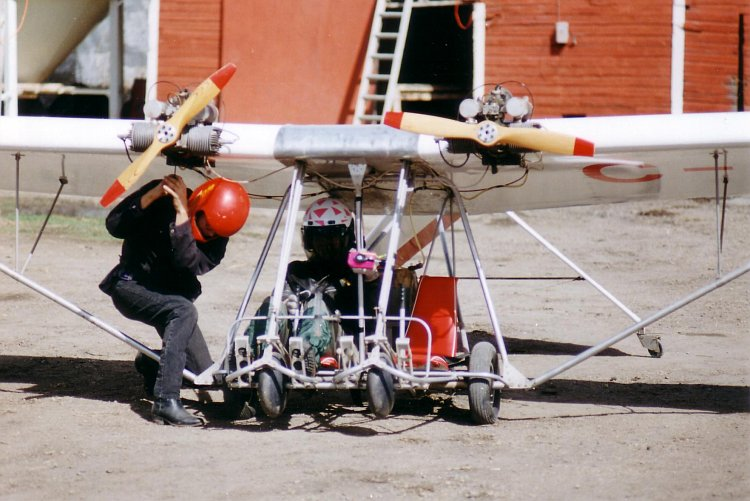
Starting a Lazair II ultralight aircraft's JPX PUL 425 engine, equipped with a recoil starter.

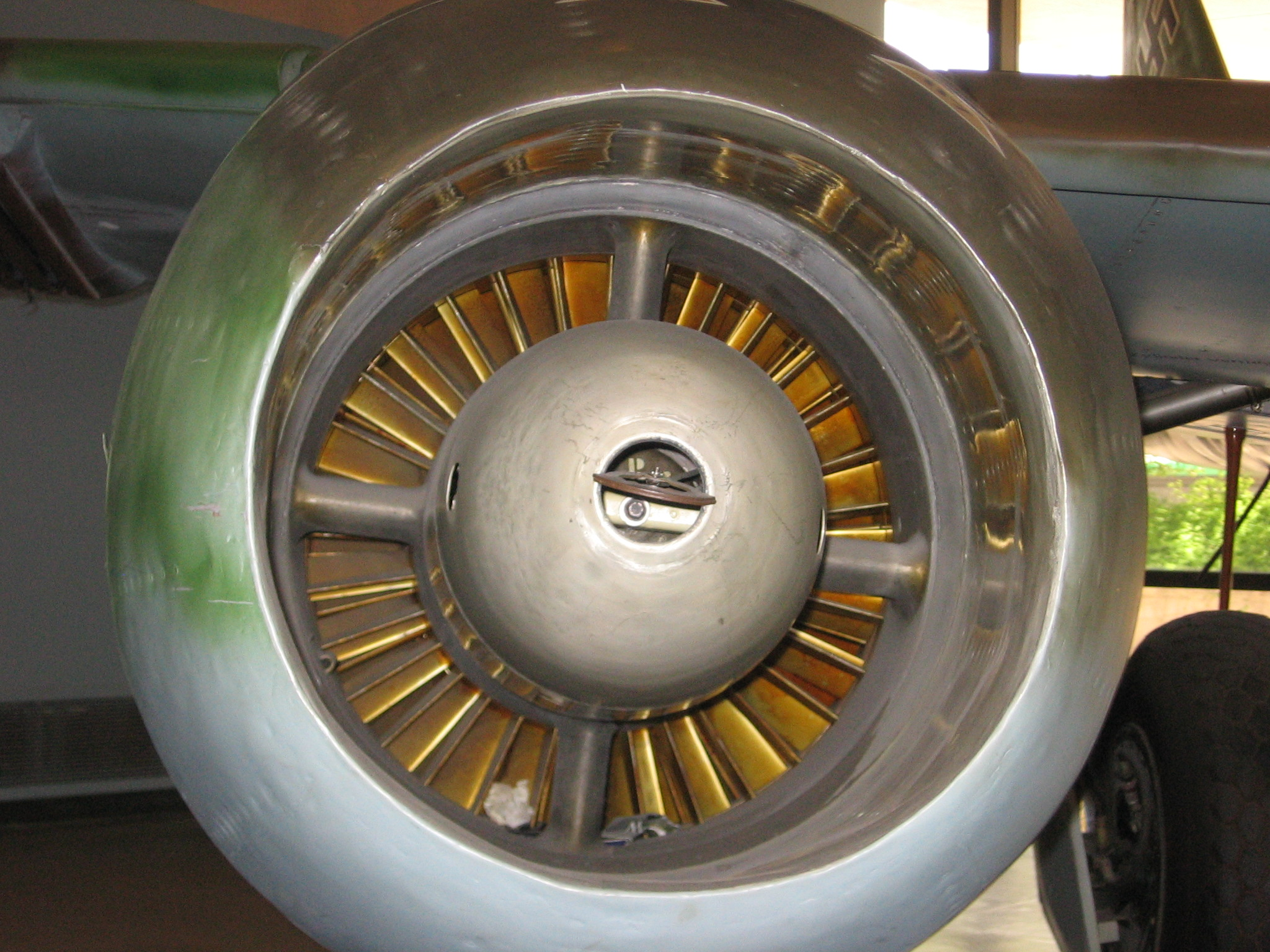
A rope start device housed in a Nose bullet of a Junkers Jumo 004 turbojet.

Rope start (also called ripcord, pull start, or rewind start) is a method of starting an internal combustion engine, usually on small machines, such as lawn mowers, chainsaws, grass trimmers, ultralight aircraft, small outboard motors and portable engine-generators. Also used on some small vehicles such as small go-karts, minibikes, and small ATVs.

== Recoil start ==
This starter mechanism comprises a rope, with a grip at the end, moulded rope reels and a spring. The rope is coiled within a reel which is held under spring tension within an outer reel. This reel assembly is in contact with one end of the crankshaft through a ratcheting mechanism (specifically, a freewheel clutch). When the rope's grip is pulled, the rope uncoils, tensions the spring, engages the clutch and turns the crankshaft, spinning it to crank or start the engine before the end of the pull stroke. The running of the engine then disengages the clutch. When the user releases the grip, the spring operated reel retracts the rope, setting it up for the next start operation. This recoiling of the rope (as opposed to the rope detaching) gives the recoil starter its name. (Should the engine fail to start, the stopping of the rope pull also disengages the clutch so the rope can be recoiled). This was created by Jacobsen Manufacturing in 1928.

== Old-style rope start ==
A reel connected to the crankshaft has a notch in it to put a rope through. The rope is wound around the reel and pulled, starting the engine, but once the end of the pull is reached, it comes free, leaving a loose rope in the person's hand. If the engine fails to start on the first pull, the operator has to re-wind it by hand.

== Easy start features ==
A number of features are labelled by manufacturers as "easy start," such as the presence of a primer bulb, an additional elastic/spring element between the starter rope and the crankshaft, a decompression release, or simply an engine which the manufacturer contends is easy to start.

A compression release feature, found on many modern engines and especially larger 2-strokes, is a valve in the combustion chamber which can be held open while the rope is being pulled, avoiding the need to overcome compression while imparting enough angular momentum for the engine to continue. Once the engine fires on its own and creates a sufficient over-pressure, the mechanism is deactivated so the engine can develop enough compression to run normally. Compression release valves may, depending on the design, either be manually opened by the operator or be automatically opened when the choke is engaged or whenever the engine is not running.
