= Birdman TL-1 =

TL-1

General information
- Type: Recreational ultralight
- Manufacturer: Birdman Aircraft for homebuilding
- Designer: Emmett M. Talley
- Number built: 300 kits sold by 1979

History
- First flight: 25 January 1975

The Birdman TL-1 was an extremely minimalist aircraft sold in kit form in the United States in the mid-1970s for US$1,395.

== Design and development ==
The TL-1's fuselage is nothing more than a boom connecting a set of wings with a V-tail. The pilot's seat and a pedestal carrying the pusher engine are attached to the top of the boom just forward of the wing. Flight control is provided by a series of spoilers.

Construction is of wood covered with Monokote and the aircraft was designed to be quickly dismantled for transport or storage. With an empty weight of 122 lb (55 kg), it is held to be the lightest aircraft to have been flown at the time.

== Variants ==
TL-1A
Base model with longer span wing.
RB-1
Later model with shorter 28 ft (8.5 m) span wing and simplified landing gear. The empty weight of this model is 122 lb (55 kg), gross weight 350 lb (159 kg), the same as the TL-1A.

== Specifications (TL-1) ==
General characteristics

- Crew: one pilot
- Length: 19 ft 5 in (5.92 m)
- Wingspan: 34 ft 0 in (10.37 m)
- Height: 7 ft 2 in (2.18 m)
- Wing area: 145 sq ft (13.5 m^{2})
- Empty weight: 122 lb (55 kg)
- Gross weight: 350 lb (159 kg)
- Powerplant: 1 × McCulloch MC101 one-cylinder two-cycle piston engine , 15 hp (11 kW)

Performance

- Maximum speed: 55 mph (89 km/h, 48 kn)
- Range: 200 mi (322 km, 170 nmi)
- Service ceiling: 5,500 ft (1,680 m)
- Rate of climb: 200 ft/min (1.0 m/s)

== See also ==
Aircraft of comparable role, configuration, and era

- Aerosport Rail
- Avid Champion
- Beaujon Enduro
- Beaujon Mach .07
- Chotia Weedhopper
- Zenair Zipper
