= Quicksilver GT500 =

American ultralight aircraft

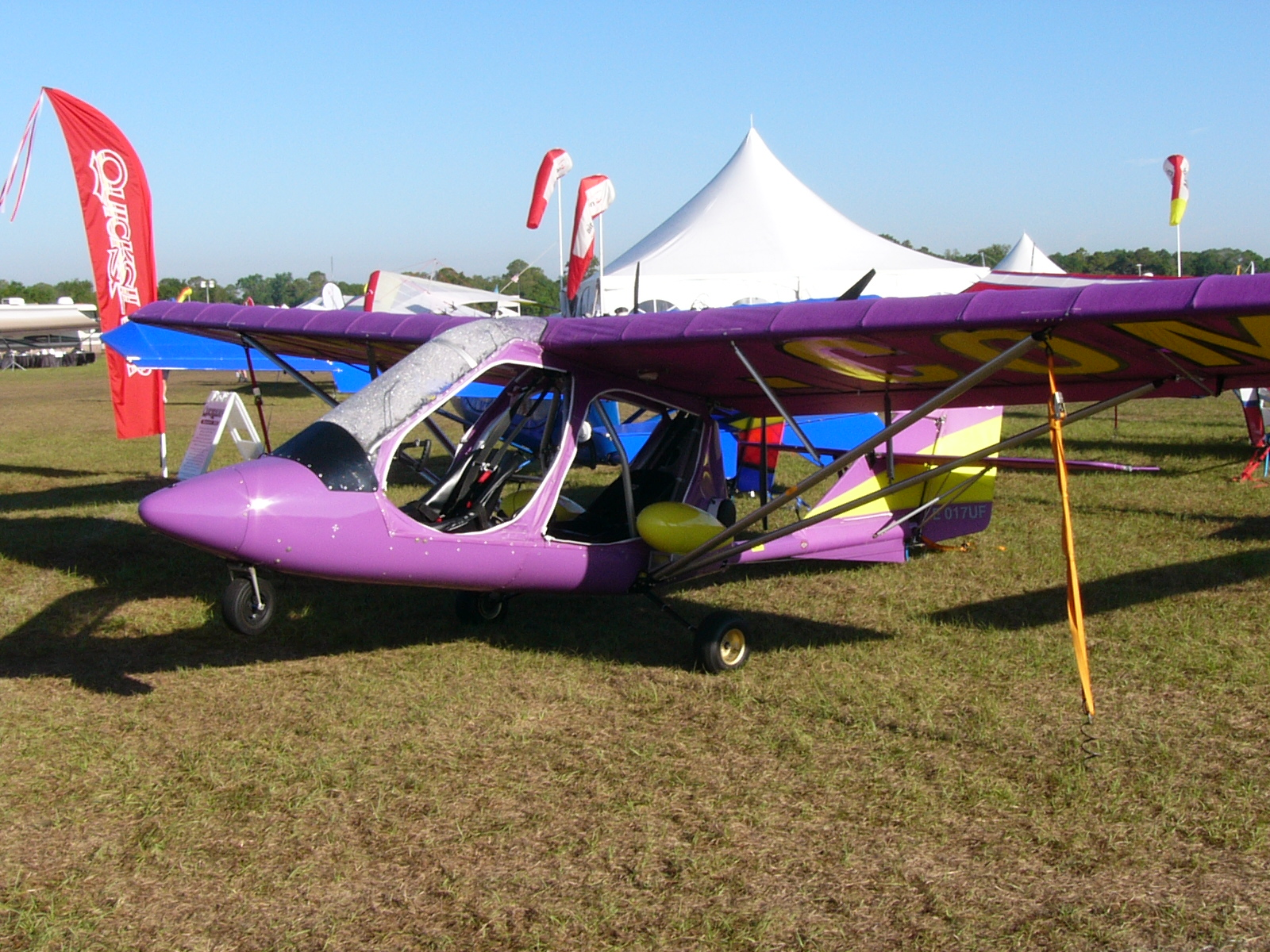
- GT500

General information
- Type: Kit aircraft
- National origin: United States
- Manufacturer: Quicksilver Manufacturing
- Designer: David Cronk
- Status: In production
- Number built: 450 (GT500 2011)

History
- Manufactured: 1990-present
- Introduction date: 1990

The Quicksilver GT500 is a family of American strut-braced, high-wing, pusher configuration, tricycle gear aircraft built by Quicksilver Aeronautics of Temecula, California. The aircraft is available as a kit for amateur construction or as a completed ready-to-fly aircraft.

== Design and development ==
The GT500 was developed specifically for the US Sportplane class of the primary aircraft category (Part 21.24 of the Federal Aviation Regulations) and, on 26 July 1994, became the first aircraft certified in that category. Reviewer Noel Bertrand wrote, "[It] may sound like a very dry achievement, but actually speaks volumes for its design integrity. Not surprisingly its flight behaviour is excellent."

The aircraft's nomenclature is unclear as the manufacturer refers to it variously as the GT500, GT 500 and the GT-500. The FAA certification officially calls it the GT500.

The GT500 is constructed from aluminium tubing, bolted together. The aircraft is covered in pre-sewn Dacron envelopes, with the forward fuselage made from fiberglass. The wing features half-span ailerons and half-span flaps. The GT500 has two seats in tandem, with dual controls featuring control columns with yokes. A 1991 upgrade included optional doors that are zippered into place adding 10 kn (19 km/h) of cruise speed, steel landing gear legs with dual brakes and an electric starter.

== Accidents and incidents ==
- August 3, 2025 - Indonesian Air Force officer and pilot Fajar Adriyanto died when a Quicksilver GT500 of the Indonesian Aero Sport Federation (FASI) registration PK-S126 crashed into a field in Benteng Village, Ciampea District, Bogor Regency. Fajar and a co-pilot were on board. Fajar died in the crash.

== Variants ==
GT400
Single-seat version equipped with a 40 horsepower (30 kW) Rotax 447 two-stroke or 50 hp (37 kW) Rotax 503 two-stroke engine. Standard empty weight is 276 pounds (125 kg) and gross weight is 570 pounds (259 kg). Originally marketed as the GT. Estimated construction time from the kit is 70 hours and 530 had been completed and flown by 2011.
GT500
Two-seats-in-tandem version powered by a 64 hp (48 kW) Rotax 582 two-stroke or an 80 hp (60 kW) Rotax 912UL four-stroke. The now out-of-production 74 hp (55 kW) Rotax 618 two-stroke was a previously available option. Other options include floats, a ballistic parachute system and crop dusting system. Estimated construction time from the kit is 185 hours and 450 had been completed and flown by 2011. The GT500 is certified in the US primary aircraft category, but only when equipped with the Rotax 582 powerplant.

== Specifications (GT500) ==
Data from Manufacturer and Type Certificate

General characteristics

- Crew: one
- Capacity: one passenger
- Length: 20 ft 5 in (6.22 m)
- Wingspan: 30 ft 0 in (9.14 m)
- Height: 6 ft 6 in (1.98 m)
- Wing area: 155 sq ft (14.4 m^{2})
- Empty weight: 575 lb (261 kg)
- Gross weight: 1,000 lb (454 kg)
- Fuel capacity: 16 U.S. gallons (61 L; 13 imp gal)
- Powerplant: 1 × Rotax 582 twin cylinder, two-stroke aircraft engine, 64 hp (48 kW)
- Propellers: 3-bladed carbon fiber ground adjustable, 6 ft (1.8 m) diameter pitch range 17 to 19°

Performance

- Maximum speed: 88 mph (142 km/h, 76 kn) with doors installed
- Cruise speed: 79 mph (127 km/h, 69 kn) with doors installed
- Stall speed: 39 mph (63 km/h, 34 kn) flaps down, power off
- Never exceed speed: 103 mph (166 km/h, 90 kn)
- Range: 215 mi (346 km, 187 nmi) with doors installed
- Service ceiling: 12,500 ft (3,800 m)
- g limits: +6.0/-3.0 ultimate
- Maximum glide ratio: 7.5:1 with doors installed
- Rate of climb: 650 ft/min (3.3 m/s)
- Wing loading: 6.45 lb/sq ft (31.5 kg/m^{2})

== See also ==
Aircraft of comparable role, configuration, and era

- Spectrum Beaver
- Birdman Chinook
