= AmEagle American Eaglet =

American Eaglet
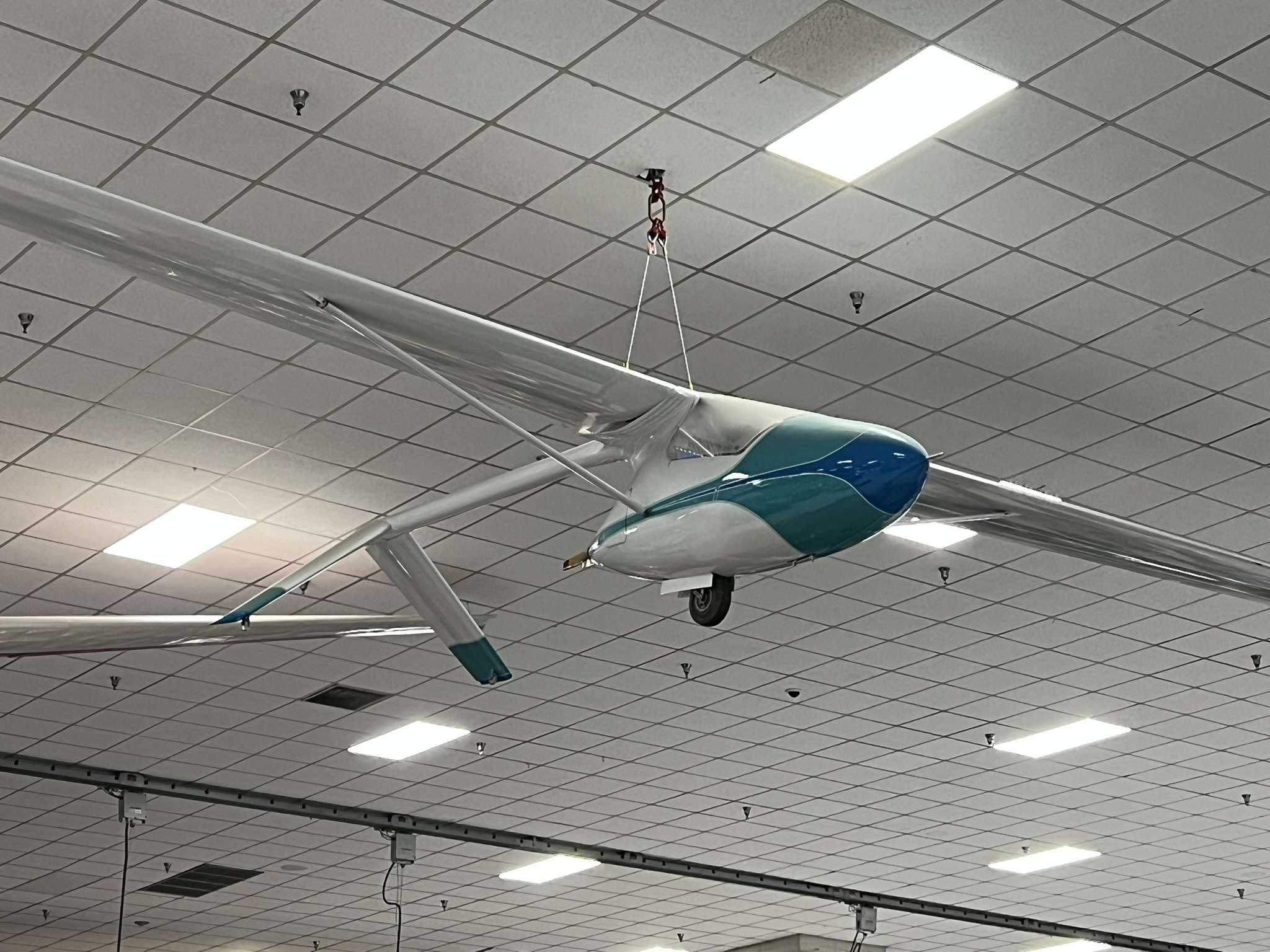
- American Eaglet at the Wings Over the Rockies Air and Space Museum

General information
- Type: Ultralight sailplane
- Manufacturer: AmEagle
- Designer: Larry Haig

History
- First flight: 19 November 1975

The AmEagle American Eaglet was a highly unorthodox ultralight sailplane marketed in the U.S. for homebuilding. It was a one-seat, high-wing braced monoplane that carried an inverted V-tail on a long boom extending from a pod-like fuselage. Intended for self-launching, it was equipped with a McCulloch go-kart engine and a folding propeller behind the cabin. Its first flight was on 19 November 1975, and by 1978, at least 250 sets of plans had been sold, with 12 aircraft reportedly completed.

== Specifications ==
Data from Jane's All the World's Aircraft 1982-83

General characteristics

- Crew: 1
- Length: 16 ft (4.9 m)
- Wingspan: 36 ft (11 m)
- Height: 3 ft (0.91 m)
- Wing area: 72 sq ft (6.7 m^{2})
- Aspect ratio: 18
- Empty weight: 160 lb (73 kg)
- Max takeoff weight: 360 lb (163 kg)
- Fuel capacity: 2 litres
- Powerplant: 1 × McCulloch MC-101B two-stroke, single-cylinder engine, 12.2 hp (9.1 kW)
- Propellers: 2-bladed

Performance

- Stall speed: 38 mph (61 km/h, 33 kn)
- g limits: +4.4/-2.2
- Rate of climb: 450 ft/min (2.3 m/s) at sea level
- Wing loading: 5 lb/sq ft (24 kg/m^{2})

== See also ==
Aircraft of comparable role, configuration, and era

- Birdman TL-1
- Pterodactyl Ascender
- Eipper Quicksilver
- Mitchell U-2 Superwing
- Stanton Sunbird, a motor glider which utlised American Eaglet components
- Ultraflight Lazair
- Zenair Zipper
