= Ultralight aircraft in the United States =

American aircraft category

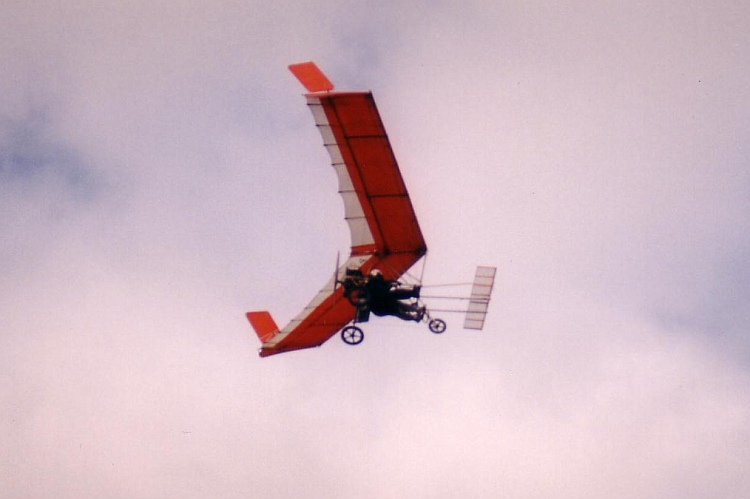
Pterodactyl Ascender ultralight vehicle

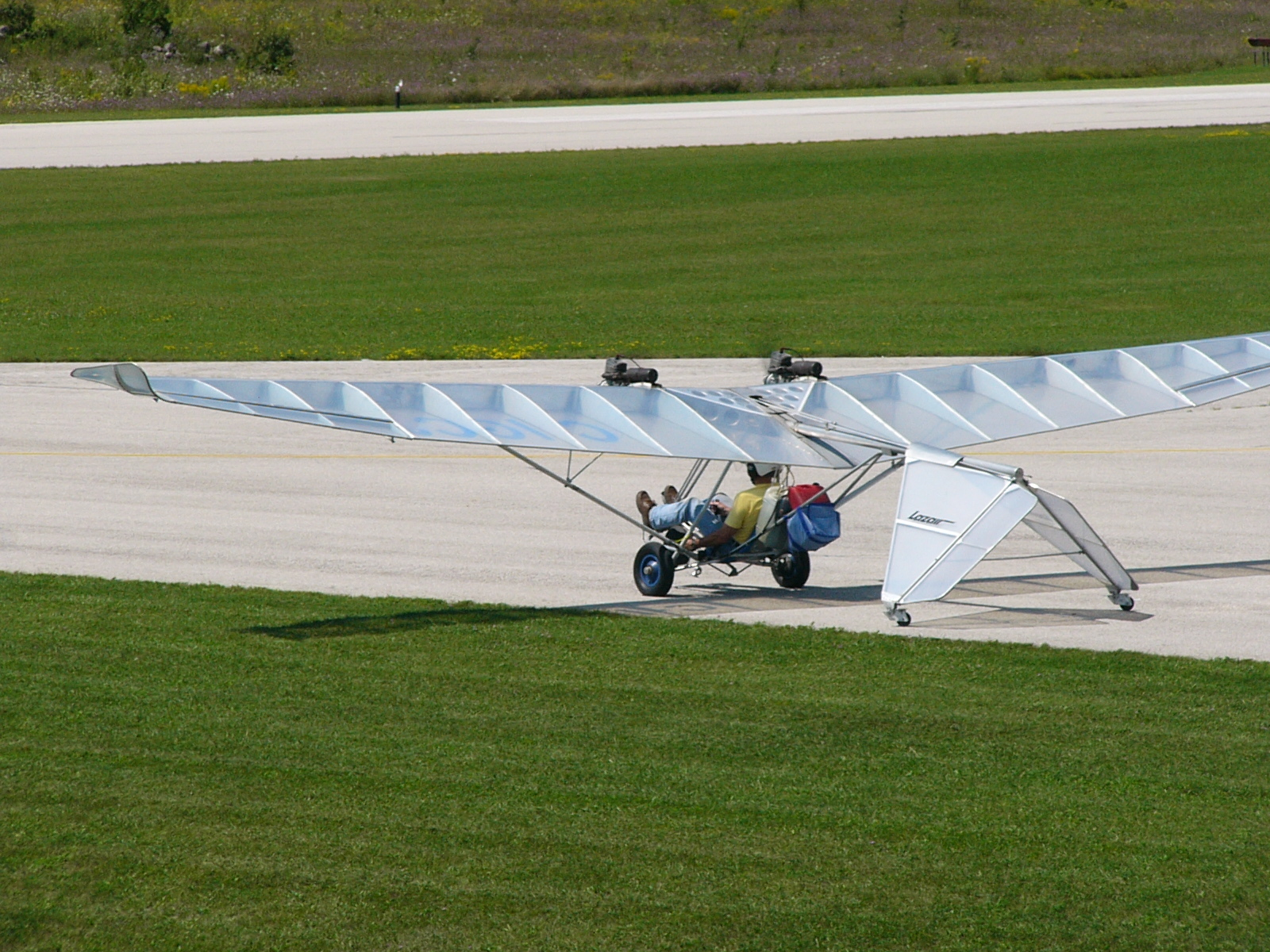
An Ultraflight Lazair

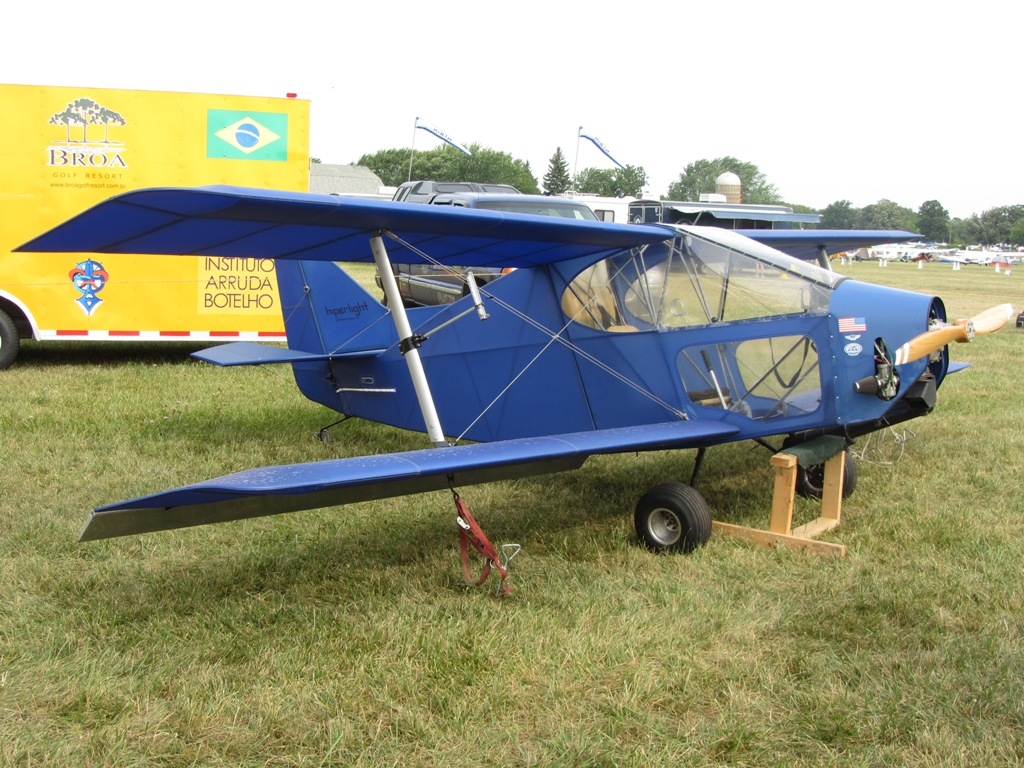
Sorrell Hiperlight

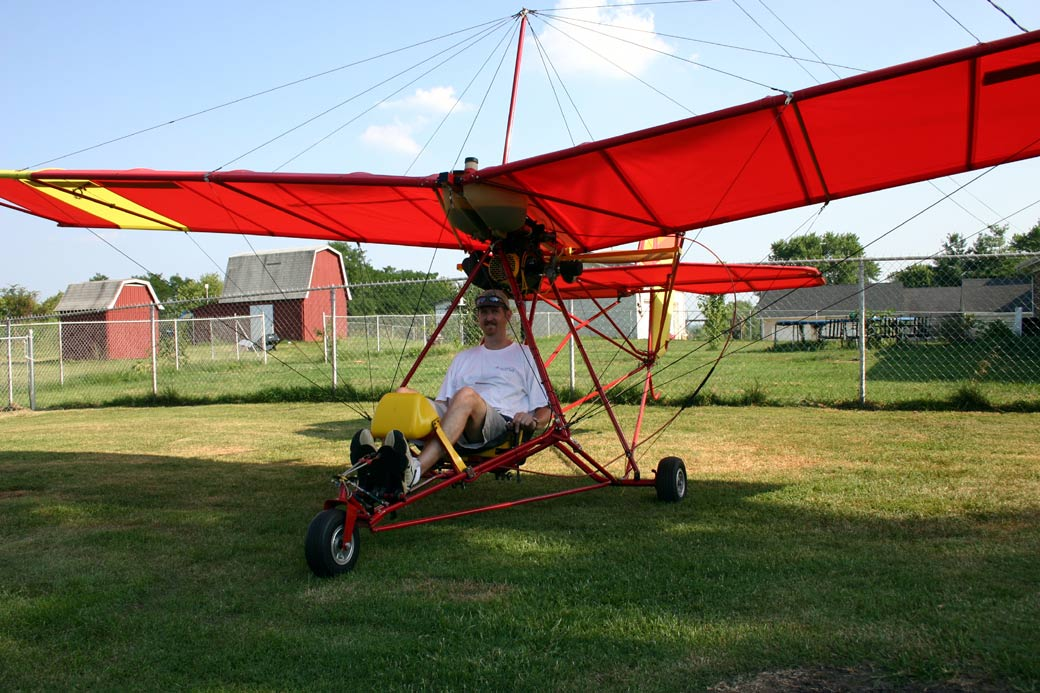
Eipper Quicksilver

Ultralight aircraft in the United States are not considered to be light-sport aircraft, are not regulated as aircraft, and are exempt from aircraft rules by the FAA. Instead, they are treated as powersport items and have to follow their own ruleset, FAR-103, which is the most compact aviation regulation in existence.

While ultralights in other countries might have airworthiness certificates, an airworthiness certificate is not allowed for an ultralight vehicle in the USA. Any existing airworthiness certificate has to be surrendered to the issueing agency, including foreign agencies, before usage as an ultralight vehicle becomes legal. The FAA emphasizes that airworthiness and compliance with FAR-103 is the responsibility of the user during every flight.

In the United States, ultralights are not registered, nor is the pilot required to have a pilot's certificate.

== United States definition of "ultralight" ==
Regulation of ultralight aircraft in the United States is covered by the Code of Federal Regulations, Title 14 (Federal Aviation Regulations), Part 103, or 14 CFR Part 103, which defines an "ultralight" as a vehicle that:

- Has only one seat
- Is used only for recreational or sport flying
- Does not have a U.S. or foreign airworthiness certificate
- If unpowered, weighs less than 155 pounds
- If powered:
  - Weighs less than 254 pounds (115 kg) empty weight, excluding floats and safety devices
  - Has a maximum fuel capacity of 5 U.S. gallons (19 L)
  - Does not exceed 55 knots (102 km/h; 63 mph) calibrated airspeed at full power in level flight
  - Has a power-off stall speed which does not exceed 24 knots (44 km/h; 28 mph) calibrated airspeed

== Certification ==
- Ultralight vehicles and their component parts and equipment are not required to meet the airworthiness certification standards specified for aircraft or to have certificates of airworthiness.
- Operators of ultralight vehicles are not required to meet any aeronautical knowledge, age, or experience requirements or to have airman or medical certificates.
- Ultralight vehicles are not required to be registered or to have registration markings.

== Operations ==
- Ultralight vehicles cannot be flown except between the hours of sunrise and sunset.
- Ultralight vehicles may be operated during the twilight periods 30 minutes before official sunrise and 30 minutes after official sunset or, in Alaska, during the period of civil twilight as defined in the Air Almanac, if:
  - The vehicle has an operating anti-collision light visible for at least 3 statute miles
  - The flights are performed in uncontrolled airspace.

In daytime, flights may not take place in Class A, B, C, D airspace, plus a special type of E airspace directly surrounding an airport, unless the pilot has prior authorization from the ATC facility with jurisdiction over that airspace.

Ultralight vehicles cannot be flown over any congested area of a city, town, or settlement, or over any open air assembly of persons.

Weight allowances can be made for amphibious landing gear, and devices deployed in an emergency, which includes ballistic parachute systems.

In the United States, while no certification or training is required by law for ultralights, training is strongly advised.

== Universal Scope ==
FAR-103 applies to three-axis planes, weight-shift planes, very light rotorcraft, balloons, hang gliders, PPGs, or whatever contraption is used to take flight. A lawnchair like that of the Lawnchair Larry flight is lighter than 155 pounds and thus qualifies as an unpowered FAR-103 Ultralight, if the user finds reliable means to stay away from the path of aircraft, outside prohibited airspace, and abides by the rules for cloud clearance.

== See also ==
- Ultralight aviation
- Ultralight trike
- Quad City Challenger
