= Avid Champion =

American ultralight aircraft

General information
- Type: Ultralight aircraft
- National origin: United States
- Manufacturer: Avid Aircraft
- Designer: Dean Wilson
- Status: Kits no longer available after November 2003

History
- Introduction date: 1998
- First flight: 1998
- Developed from: Avid Mark IV

The Avid Champion is an American single-seat, high-wing ultralight aircraft that was produced starting in 1998 as a kit by Avid Aircraft of Caldwell, Idaho, later Ennis, Montana.

Avid Aircraft went out of business in November 2003, and the aircraft kits are no longer available.

== Development ==
The Champion was created by scaling down the Avid Mark IV and narrowing the wider fuselage into a single-seat design intended to comply with the US FAR 103 Ultralight Vehicles category.

The design is a conventional tractor configuration, featuring tube and aircraft fabric construction. The factory-welded fuselage uses 4130 chromoly steel tubing. The aluminum wing spars are predrilled and die-drawn, to support prebuilt birch plywood ribs, covered with doped Dacron fabric. The cockpit is usually left uncovered.

The main landing gear is bungee-suspended and includes a steerable tailwheel. Like other Avid designs, the wing has an under-cambered airfoil, Junkers style ailerons and scalloped trailing edges. The wing can be folded for storage and the aircraft can be towed on its wheels behind a car. The wing folding mechanism does not include automatic connecting ailerons. The cockpit will accommodate a pilot up to 6.5 ft (2.0 m) in height and 300 lb (136 kg) in weight. Two door options were originally available, a Piper J-3 Cub-style horizontally split door or an overhead-hinged door.

The Champion only meets the US FAR 103 ultralight vehicle category maximum empty weight limit of 254 lb (115 kg), with the lightest of single cylinder, two-stroke engines installed, such as the 28 hp (21 kW) Rotax 277 and the removal of the cowling, brakes, doors and most of the instruments. When the kit was available, the company did not provide an engine for it, leaving the choice of engines and compliance with FAR 103 restrictions up to the owner. The standard empty weight with the 40 hp (30 kW) Rotax 447 powerplant was 284 lb (129 kg). The aircraft qualifies as an amateur-built in many countries including the US and Canada.

Building time to complete the kit was reported by the company to be 160 hours. When the aircraft was introduced in 1998, the kit cost was US$8995, without an engine. Complete airframes, also without an engine, were available for US$12,995.

== Operational history ==
Andre Cliche's flight review of the Champion describes it as "light and responsive" and "agile", but cautions that the Junkers full-span ailerons produce high roll rates and high adverse yaw. He also indicated that "the overall responsiveness and taildragger reactions might tax beginners' capabilities." Ultralight reviewer Dan Johnson concurred.

Jim Bethea of UltraFlight magazine said: "The Champion is arguably the best fixed-wing ultralight available and perhaps the most overlooked."

With the Rotax 447 engine, the aircraft can take-off in under 100 ft (30 m), as one owner explained: "You'd better be ready when you advance the throttle because the plane will jump off the ground within the next three seconds!" Landings in crosswinds have been described as "easy with a forward slip and touchdown on one main wheel". A full rudder slip will produce a descent rate of 2000 feet per minute (10 m/s).

Because the choice of engine installed was left up to the builder, a variety of engines has been used, including the Rotax 277, 447 and the 50 hp (37 kW) Rotax 503.

== Specifications (Champion with Rotax 277) ==
Data from Cliche & KitPlanes

General characteristics

- Crew: one
- Capacity: 340 lb (154 kg); no passengers
- Length: 17 ft 7 in (5.37 m)
- Wingspan: 26 ft 10 in (8.17 m)
- Height: 6 ft 0 in (1.83 m)
- Wing area: 114.5 sq ft (10.65 m^{2})
- Empty weight: 254 lb (115 kg)
- Max takeoff weight: 594 lb (269 kg)
- Powerplant: 1 × Rotax 277 , 28 hp (21 kW)

Performance

- Maximum speed: 65 mph (105 km/h, 56 kn)
- Cruise speed: 63 mph (102 km/h, 55 kn)
- Stall speed: 26 mph (42 km/h, 23 kn)
- Range: 104 mi (168 km, 90 nmi)
- Service ceiling: 9,000 ft (2,745 m)
- Rate of climb: 700 ft/min (3.6 m/s)
- Wing loading: 5.19 lb/sq ft (25.26 kg/m^{2})
- Power/mass: 21.21 lb/hp (0.078 kW/kg)

== See also ==
Aircraft of comparable role, configuration, and era

- Aero-Works Aerolite 103
- Beaujon Mach .07
- Beaujon Enduro
- Birdman WT-11 Chinook
- Dart Skycycle
- Fisher FP-202 Koala
- Fisher FP-505 Skeeter
- Fisher FP-606 Sky Baby
- Freebird I
- ISON Airbike
- Skystar Kitfox Lite
- Spectrum RX-28 Beaver
- Wood Sky Pup
