= Jolene Van Vugt =

Canadian motocross rider

Personal information
- Full name: Jolene Van Vugt
- Nicknames: Nitro Girl, Jo
- Born: September 17, 1980 (age 46) London, Ontario, Canada

Sport
- Sport: Motocross, supercross, freestyle motocross, sky diving
Medal record
See: Career highlights

Jolene Van Vugt (born September 17, 1980) is a Canadian motocross rider. She is the first CMRC Women's Canadian Motocross National Champion, first woman to backflip a full-sized dirt bike, holder of multiple Guinness World Records, and co-star of many motocross/stunt videos. She also appeared in the television show Nitro Circus.

== Biography ==
Born in London, Ontario to Dutch immigrant parents Bill and Tina Van Vugt, the youngest of three children, Van Vugt grew up heavily influenced by her father, a young at heart avid motocross racer, while her mother wanted her to become a figure skater or ballerina. At the age of 11, Van Vugt convinced her father to buy her a dirt bike, after much debate about her commitment to her ever-changing hobbies.

At the age of 14, Van Vugt was given the ultimatum to either practice, race and take motocross seriously or give it up for good. Van Vugt chose to focus full-time on motocross and quickly rose to the top ranks of Canadian women's motocross. She earned multiple Ontario Provincial Championships, a ninth place overall in the WMA (Women's Motocross Association), and earned her lifetime number 63. She also competed in many prestigious motocross events, such as the Loretta Lynn's Amateur National and the TransCan Canadian Amateur Grand National Championship.

From 2006, Van Vugt has been part of the television show Nitro Circus, originally a mini-series broadcast by Fuel TV that became a full series broadcast by MTV in 2009. In 2012, she performed Catwoman's driving stunts in the film The Dark Knight Rises.

In September 2015, Van Vugt was seriously injured when attempting to do a ramp jump using a slingshot (a device used to propel bikes to high speeds in a short distance). The injuries required multiple reconstructive surgeries to her face and were expected to take months of recovery before she could perform again.

== Career highlights ==
2003

- CMRC Ladies Ontario Provincial Champion
- TransCan Canadian Grand National Championship, Walton Raceway, Ladies 2nd
- CMX Canadian National Championship, Ladies 2nd
- WML Pro National Binghamton, N.Y. Round 5, 16th

2004

- CMRC Ladies Ontario Provincial Champion
- TransCan Canadian Grand National Championship, Walton Raceway, Ladies 2nd
- CMX Ladies Canadian National Champion
- WMA Pro National Monster Mtn. AL. Round 4, 7th
- WMA Pro National Cohcoton, N.Y. Round 5, 7th
- WMA Pro National Steel City, PA. Round 6, 7th
- WMA Pro National Series 9th (Earning lifetime National #)

2005

- First woman to backflip a full-sized dirtbike, ramp to dirt
- TransCan Canadian Grand National Championship, Walton Raceway, Ladies 2nd
- CMRC Ladies Ontario Provincial, 3rd
- WMA Pro National Glen Helen, CA. Round 1, 20th
- WMA Pro National Hangtown, CA. Round 2, 31st
- WMA Pro National ThunderValley, CO. Round 3, 15th
- WMA Pro National Washogual, WA. Round 4, 8th
- WMA Pro National Steel City, PA. Round 5, 11th
- WMA Pro National Series 16th

2006

- CMRC Women's Canadian National Champion
- Setting a female backflip distance record, 60 ft ramp to dirt
- WMA Pro National Glen Helen, CA. Round 1, 16th
- WMA Pro National Hangtown, CA. Round 2, 18th
- Out for the remaining season due to surgery

2007

- CMRC Women's Canadian National Championship, 2nd
- TransCan Canadian Grand National Championship, Walton Raceway, Ladies Champion
- First woman to backflip a dirt bike into Grand Canyon
- WMA Pro National Budds Creek, MD. Round 3, 15th
- WMA Pro National Steel City, PA. Round 6, 13th

2008

- Guinness World Record for first woman to backflip a dirt bike
- Guinness World Record for longest female backflip
- CMRC Women's Canadian National Championship, 3rd
- WMA Pro National Southwick, MA. Round 5, 11th
- TransCan Canadian Grand National Championship, Walton Raceway, Ladies Champion
- First woman to jump at MOD FMX show in Austria

2010

- First woman to backflip a full-sized dirt bike, ramp to ramp
- Nitro Circus Live, Brisbane, Australia, May 7

== Filmography ==
=== Television ===
- Rob Dyrdek's Fantasy Factory (1 episode, 2009)
- Nitro Circus (2009)
- Nitro Circus Live (2011–2014)
- Ridiculousness (1 episode, 2016)
- Z Nation (1 episode, 2016)
- Jay Leno's Garage (1 episode, 2020)
- Barry (3 episodes, 2022)

=== Films ===
- Jackass Presents: Mat Hoffman's Tribute to Evel Knievel (2008)
- Nitro Circus: The Movie (2012)
- The Dark Knight Rises (2012)
- Sonic the Hedgehog (2020)
