= Cloud Buster =

Cloud Buster may refer to:

- Adcox Cloud Buster, an American sport aircraft
- Cloudbuster, a pseudoscientific rainmaking device
- Cloudbuster Ultralights Cloudbuster, an American ultralight aircraft

== See also ==
- Buster Sword, a fictional sword of Cloud Strife in the video game series Final Fantasy
