= Blair Morgan =

Canadian motocross racer

- Born: October 9, 1975 (age 50); Prince Albert, Saskatchewan, Canada
- Other name: Superman
- Occupations: Motocross and Snocross Racer
- Organization(s): Arctic Cat (1997–2000); Ski-Doo (2001–2008)
- Style: Free Agent

Blair Morgan (born October 9, 1975) is a Canadian former professional motocross and snowmobile racer. He was a member of the Ski-Doo Racing Team and a former snocross racer who was also a member of the Arctic Cat team. He is a multi-time CMRC winner and a five-time X-Games gold medalist.

Morgan is considered a pioneer in the sport of snocross racing and freestyle and is credited with popularizing rider-forward chassis designs. He won 89 National events and 13 points championships. In 2013, he was inducted into the International Snowmobile Racing Hall of Fame.

== Motocross ==
Morgan started racing in his early teens in his home province of Saskatchewan. He progressed through to the ranks of Pro, and made his debut on the Canadian National scene in 1993 at Walton Raceway's TransCan GNC. In 1997, he competed in the Nationals as a member of Two Wheel Kawasaki. He won the 250 title the next year but lost the overall crown to Dube. He would regain the number one plate in 1999. 2000 marked a year of significant growth for the Canadian Nationals, and Morgan switched to the Blackfoot Honda team. Injury held him to a #7 ranking for the year, but he rebounded in 2001 and battled Jean Sebastien Roy throughout the year. Morgan scored more wins, but the title went to the Quebecer. Morgan won the four-stroke class at the US Open of Supercross that fall, the first win for the Honda CRF450R. In 2002, Morgan again ended with the #2 plate. He started his own Yamaha team for 2003, but an accident at Nanaimo, British Columbia, ruined his season. A series of nagging injuries from both motocross and snocross affected him for the next few years. In 2006, Morgan returned to form with Blackfoot Honda and scored multiple podiums to finish the year third overall behind Dusty Klatt and Roy.

== Snocross ==
Morgan started racing snocross for Arctic Cat full-time in 1997. His stand-up, high-flying, and aggressive motocross style revolutionized the sport. He claimed most of the race wins and championships for the next several seasons. During the 2001–2002 season, Morgan switched to Ski-Doo. until, in 2003, motocross injuries derailed further title hopes. He raced again in 2004 and was injured in 2005. In June 2008, it was reported that Morgan was "looking for a new ride", making him a free agent. In September 2008, Morgan announced his retirement from competition after injuring his spine in a motorcycle accident.

== Spine injury ==
On September 21, 2008, Morgan suffered a fall from his motorcycle during a practice session at the Montreal Supercross. The fall crushed his L4 and L5 vertebrae and severed his spine at the T4 vertebra, paralyzing him from the upper back down. The Canadian Motocross des Nations Team dedicated the year's MXDN race to Morgan.

After the initial treatment at a hospital in Montreal, Morgan started rehab in Saskatoon two weeks later. He was interviewed on his rehabilitation in November 2008, where he said, "Hopefully in 10 years I'll be out of that chair -- or sooner, that would be nice."

== Return to racing ==
On January 27, 2018, Morgan returned to competitive racing at the inaugural Adaptive Snow BikeCross event during Winter X Games XXII.

Morgan again participated in the 2019 X Games Para Snow BikeCross event, now formalized. He was in medal contention until the first minute, when he hit an obstacle, and never retained the lead.

== Career titles ==
- 1999 CMRC National Motocross Champion
- 1997 CMRC National Motocross Champion
- 1998 CMRC 250 National Champion
- 5 X-Games Gold Medals (Snocross)
- Multi-time Snocross World Championships and race wins
