= Freedom Lite SS-11 Skywatch =

Canadian ultralight aircraft

SS-11 Skywatch
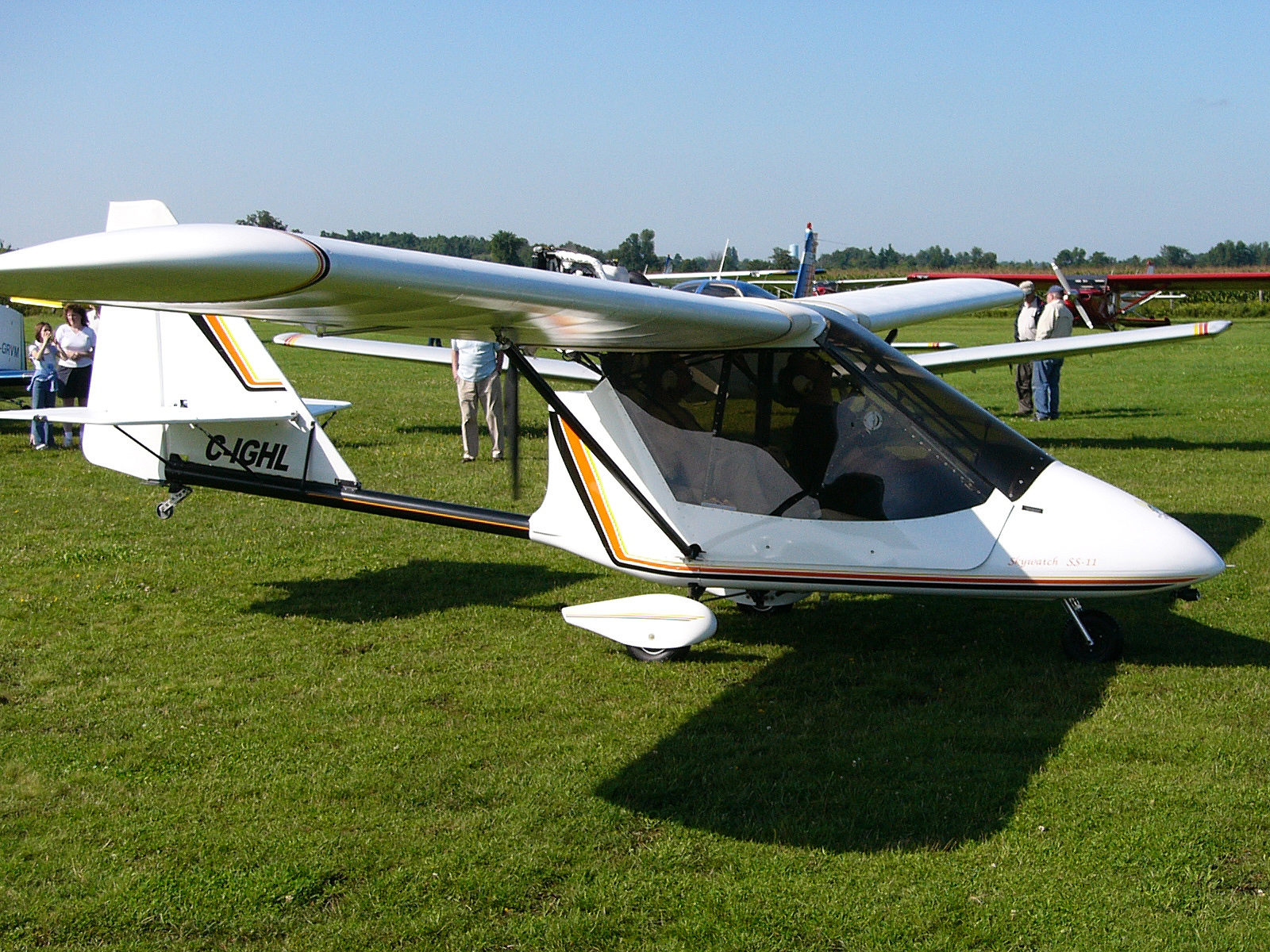

General information
- Type: Ultralight aircraft
- National origin: Canada
- Manufacturer: Freedom Lite; Legend Lite
- Status: Production completed
- Number built: 15 (2001)

History
- Introduction date: 1996
- Developed from: Spectrum Beaver RX650

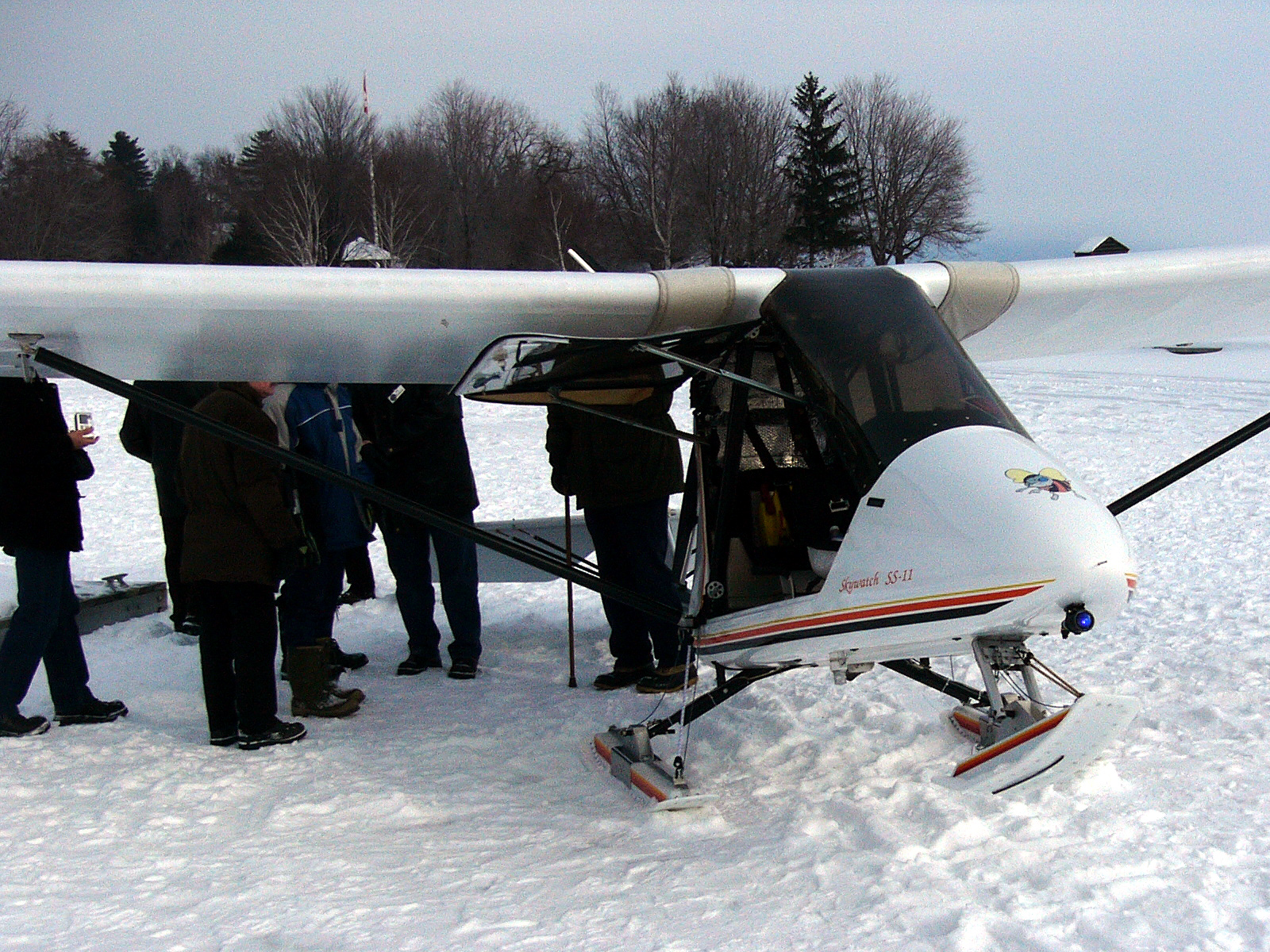
Skywatch SS11 on skis

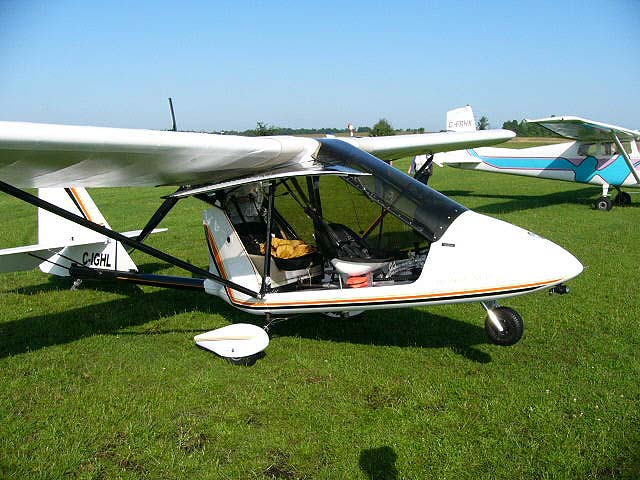
Skywatch SS11 with doors open

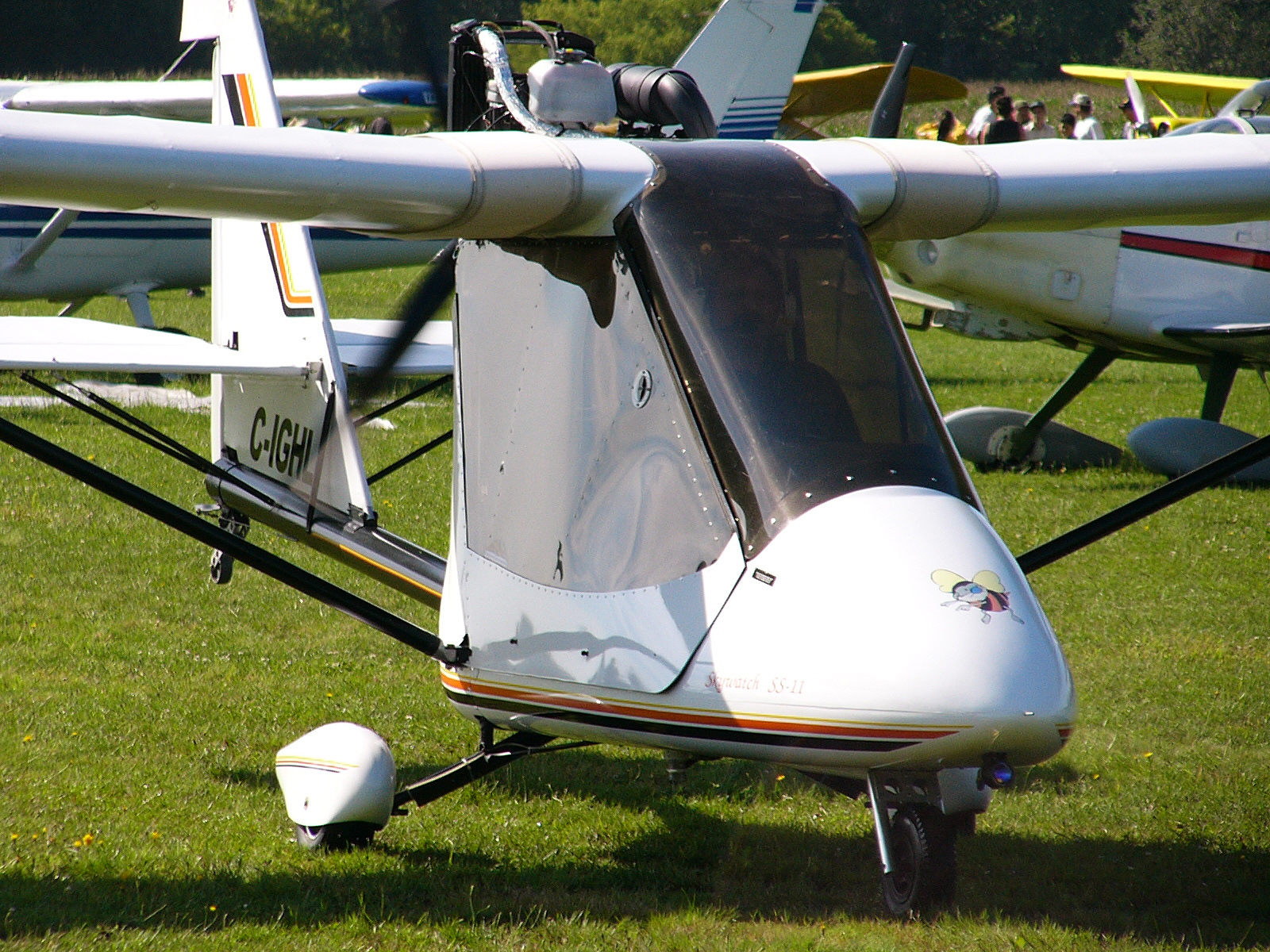
Skywatch SS11 showing doors and fuselage shape

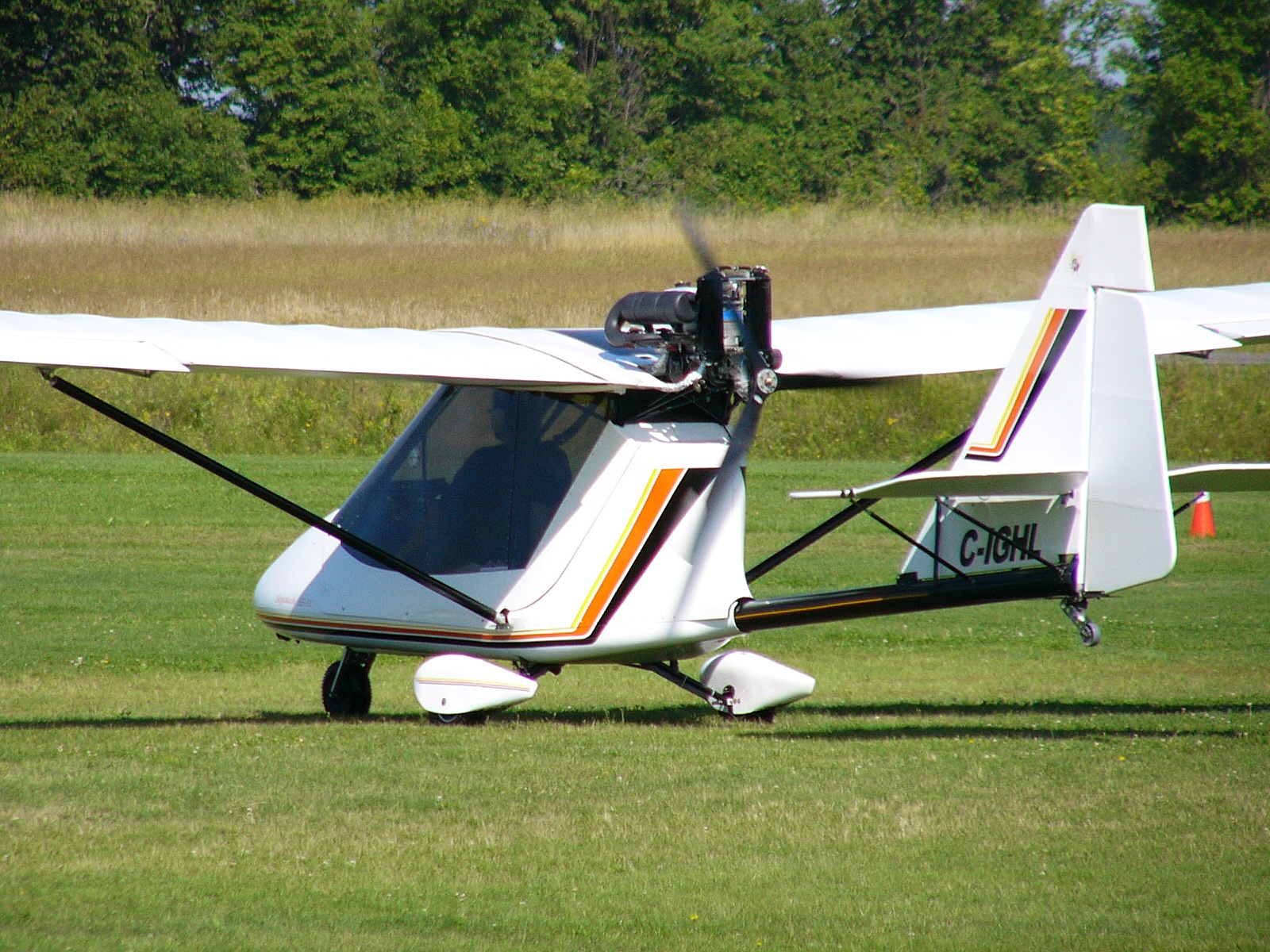
Skywatch SS11 showing Rotax 582 engine and radiator mounting

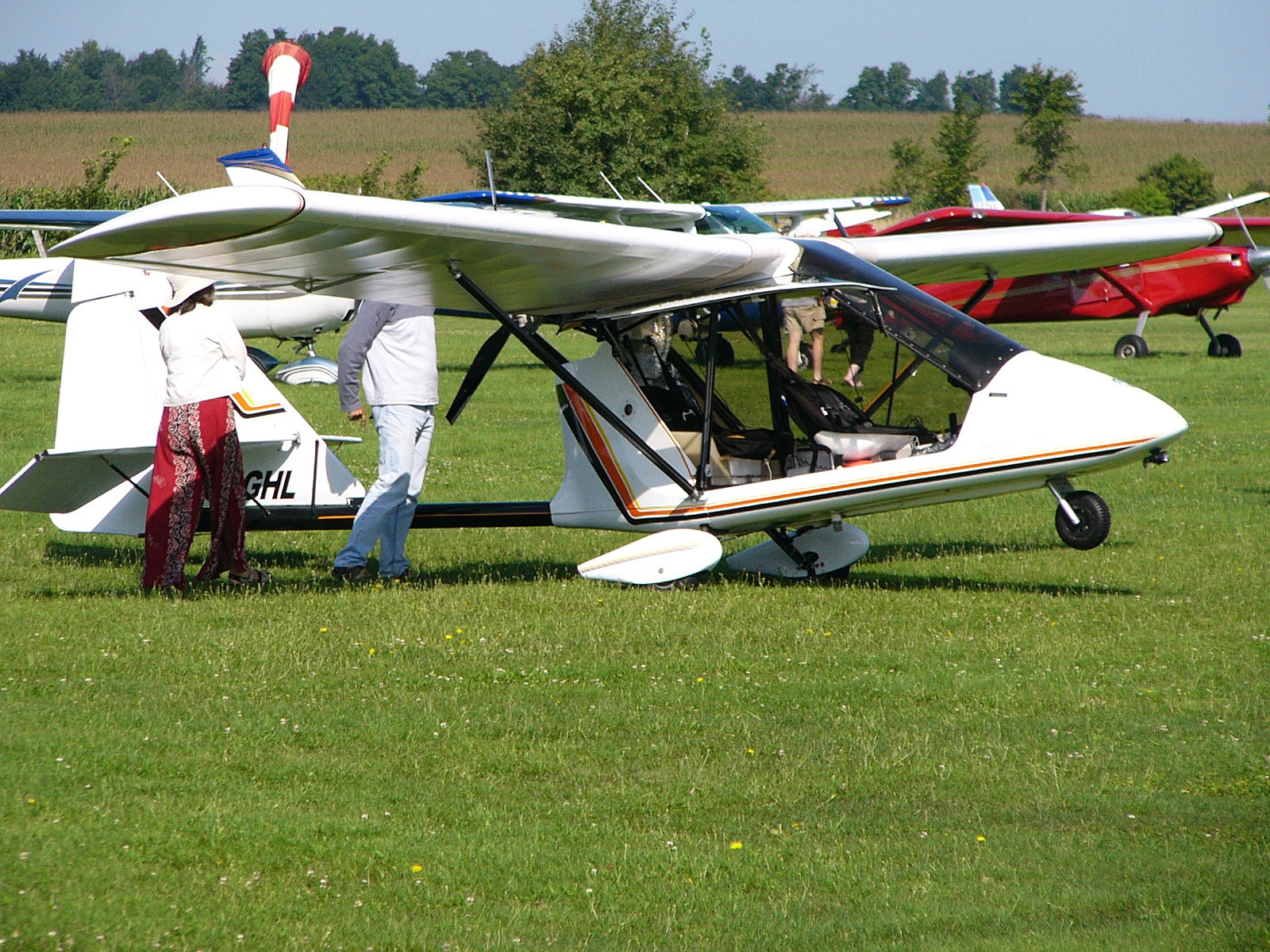
Skywatch SS11 sitting on its tail while unladen

The Freedom Lite SS-11 Skywatch (also called the Skywatch SS11) is a Canadian ultralight aircraft that was produced by Freedom Lite of Walton, Ontario and later by Legend Lite of New Hamburg, Ontario, introduced in 1996. When it was available the aircraft was supplied as a complete ready-to-fly-aircraft, or as a kit for amateur construction.

In Canada the SS-11 is a Transport Canada-accepted Advanced Ultra-Light Aeroplane

== Design and development ==
Developed from the Spectrum Beaver RX650, the SS-11 Skywatch features a strut-braced high-wing, a two-seats-in-tandem enclosed cockpit accessed through upwards opening doors supported by folding struts, fixed tricycle landing gear with wheel pants, a small auxiliary tail wheel and a single engine in pusher configuration.

In improving the RX650 the company made 186 design changes to produce the SS-11. The most obvious change was the move from Dacron envelopes for the wings to doped aircraft fabric covering.

The aircraft is made from 4130 steel and aluminum tubing, plus fibreglass, with its flying surfaces covered with doped aircraft fabric. The cockpit cage is all 4130 steel, while the tail boom tube is aluminum. Its 33.00 ft (10.1 m) span wing lacks flaps and has a wing area of 155.0 sq ft (14.40 m^{2}). The wing is built with an aluminum structure, with an I-beam spar and stamped ribs. The SS-11 has folding wings and a folding tail as well, to allow ground transport or storage. Folding the wings can be accomplished by one person in a few minutes, with the struts supporting the wing.

The nose wheel is steerable, dual controls were factory standard, while the vertically-hinged cockpit doors were an option. With no occupants the aircraft sits on its tail.

The SS-11's acceptable installed engine power range is 50 to 75 hp (37 to 56 kW) and the standard engines used are the 50 hp (37 kW) Rotax 503 and the 64 hp (48 kW) Rotax 582 twin cylinder, two-stroke powerplants.

The SS-11 Skywatch has a typical empty weight of 420 lb (190 kg) and a gross weight of 950 lb (430 kg), giving a useful load of 530 lb (240 kg). With full fuel of 13 U.S. gallons (49 L; 11 imp gal) the payload for the pilot, passenger and baggage is 452 lb (205 kg).

The aircraft was manufactured using computer numeric-controlled matched centres. The manufacturer estimated that the supplied kit could be completed in about 250 hours of work.

== Operational history ==
In January 2017 there were six SS-11s registered with Transport Canada, but none registered in the United States with the Federal Aviation Administration.

== Specifications (SS-11 Skywatch) ==
Data from AeroCrafter

General characteristics

- Crew: one
- Capacity: one passenger
- Length: 21 ft 6 in (6.55 m)
- Wingspan: 33 ft 0 in (10.06 m)
- Wing area: 155.0 sq ft (14.40 m^{2})
- Empty weight: 420 lb (191 kg)
- Gross weight: 950 lb (431 kg)
- Fuel capacity: 9 U.S. gallons (34 L; 7.5 imp gal) standard or 13 U.S. gallons (49 L; 11 imp gal) optional
- Powerplant: 1 × Rotax 503 twin cylinder, air-cooled, two-stroke aircraft engine, 50 hp (37 kW)
- Propellers: 3-bladed composite

Performance

- Maximum speed: 90 mph (140 km/h, 78 kn)
- Cruise speed: 80 mph (130 km/h, 70 kn)
- Stall speed: 29 mph (47 km/h, 25 kn)
- Range: 405 mi (652 km, 352 nmi)
- Service ceiling: 13,000 ft (4,000 m)
- Rate of climb: 1,100 ft/min (5.6 m/s)
- Wing loading: 6.1 lb/sq ft (30 kg/m^{2})
