= SS-11 =

SS-11 may refer to:

- SS.11, a French anti-tank missile
- SS-11 Sego, a Soviet intercontinental ballistic missile
- Raketenjagdpanzer SS-11, a German tank destroyer
- Freedom Lite SS-11 Skywatch, an ultralight aircraft
- USS B-2 (SS-11), a submarine of the United States Navy
