= Spectrum Beaver =

Canadian ultralight aircraft

Beaver
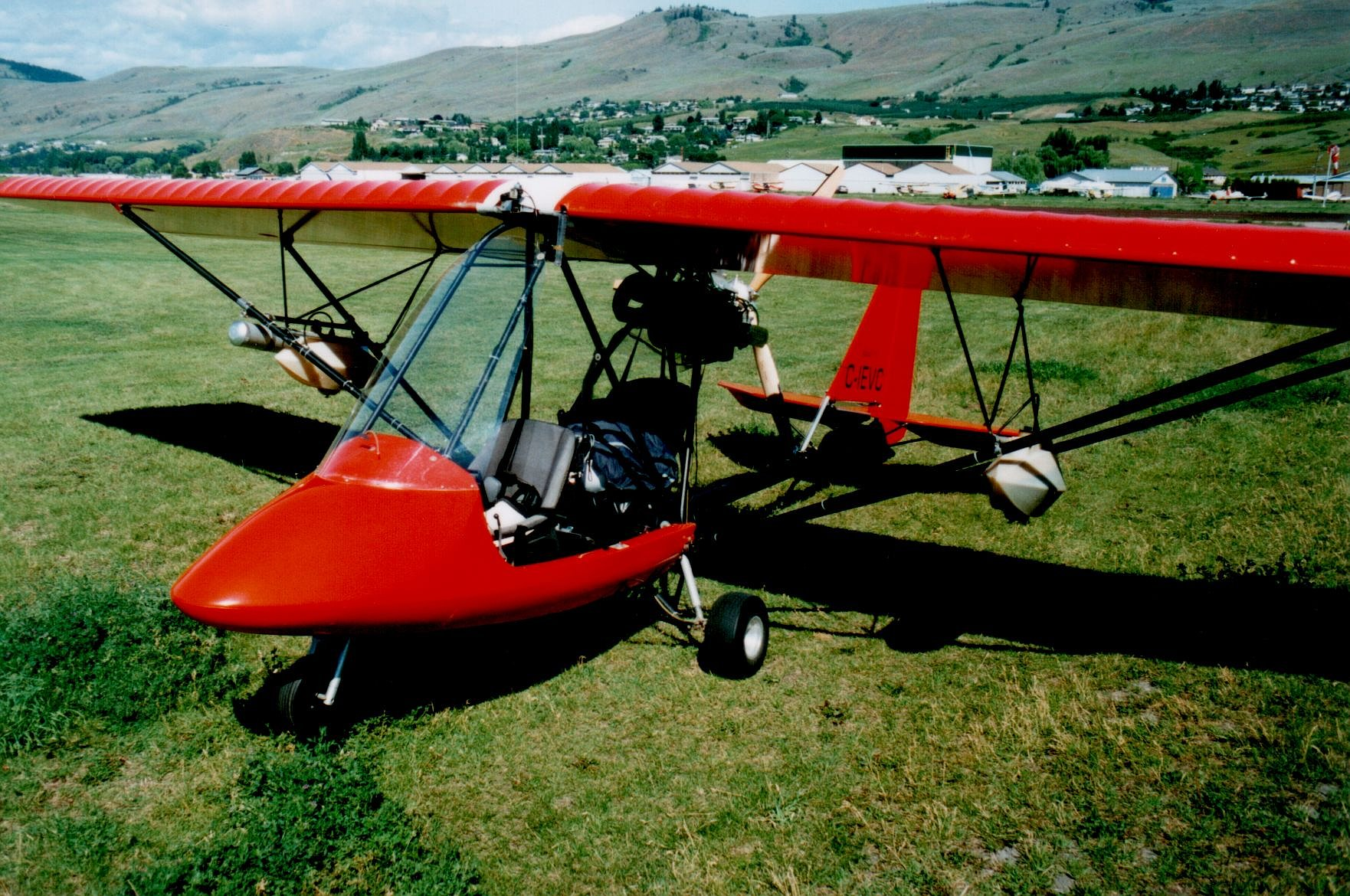
- ASAP Beaver RX 550 Plus

General information
- Type: Ultralight aircraft
- National origin: Canada
- Manufacturer: Spectrum Aircraft; Beaver RX Enterprises; Fun Flight Inc; Aircraft Sales and Parts
- Designer: Larry Croome
- Status: Kits in production
- Number built: 2080 (2011)

History
- Introduction date: 1983
- First flight: 1983
- Variant: Freedom Lite SS-11 Skywatch

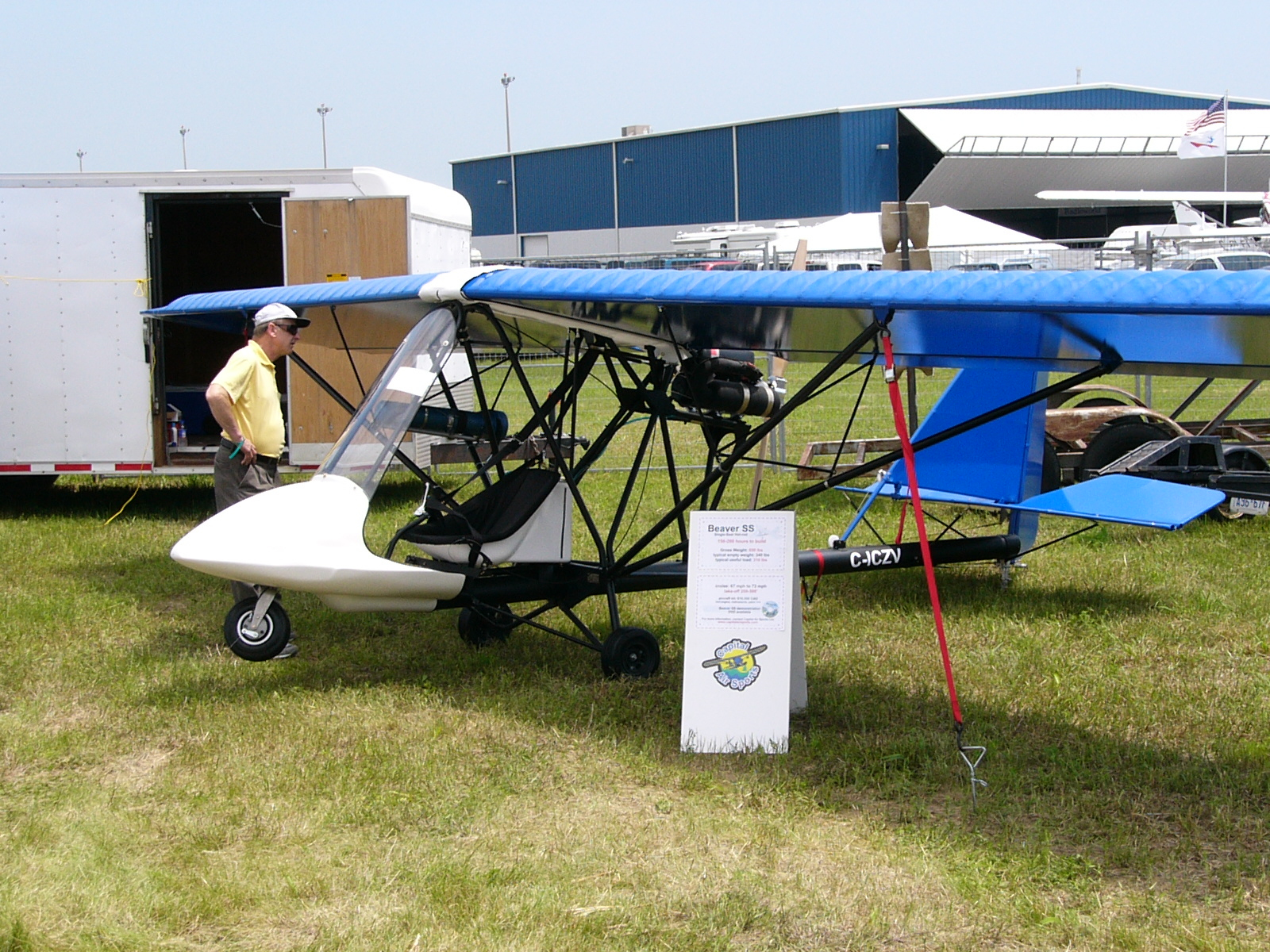
ASAP Beaver SS at the Canadian Aviation Expo

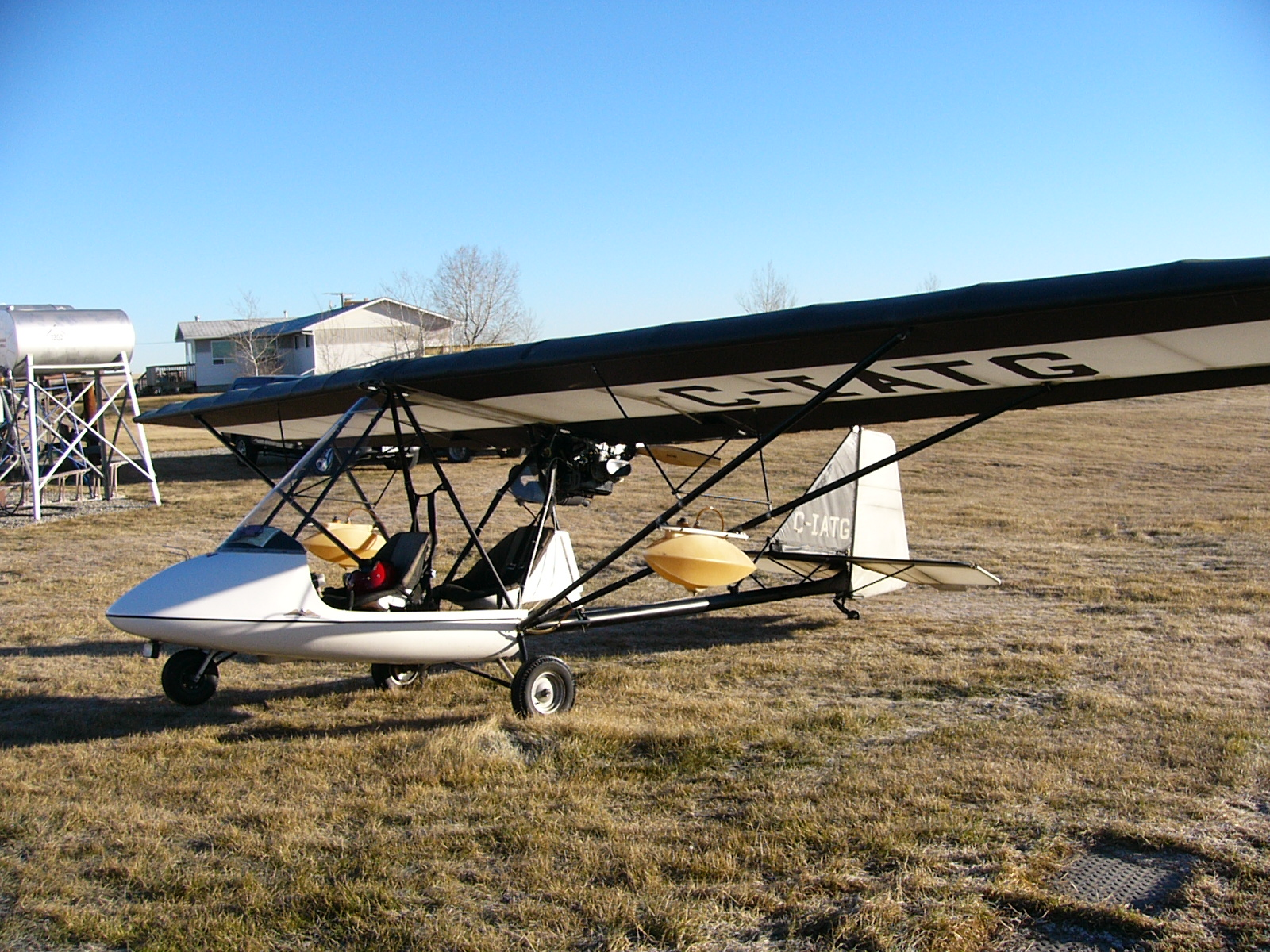
Spectrum Beaver RX 550 at Chestermere (Kirkby Field) Airport

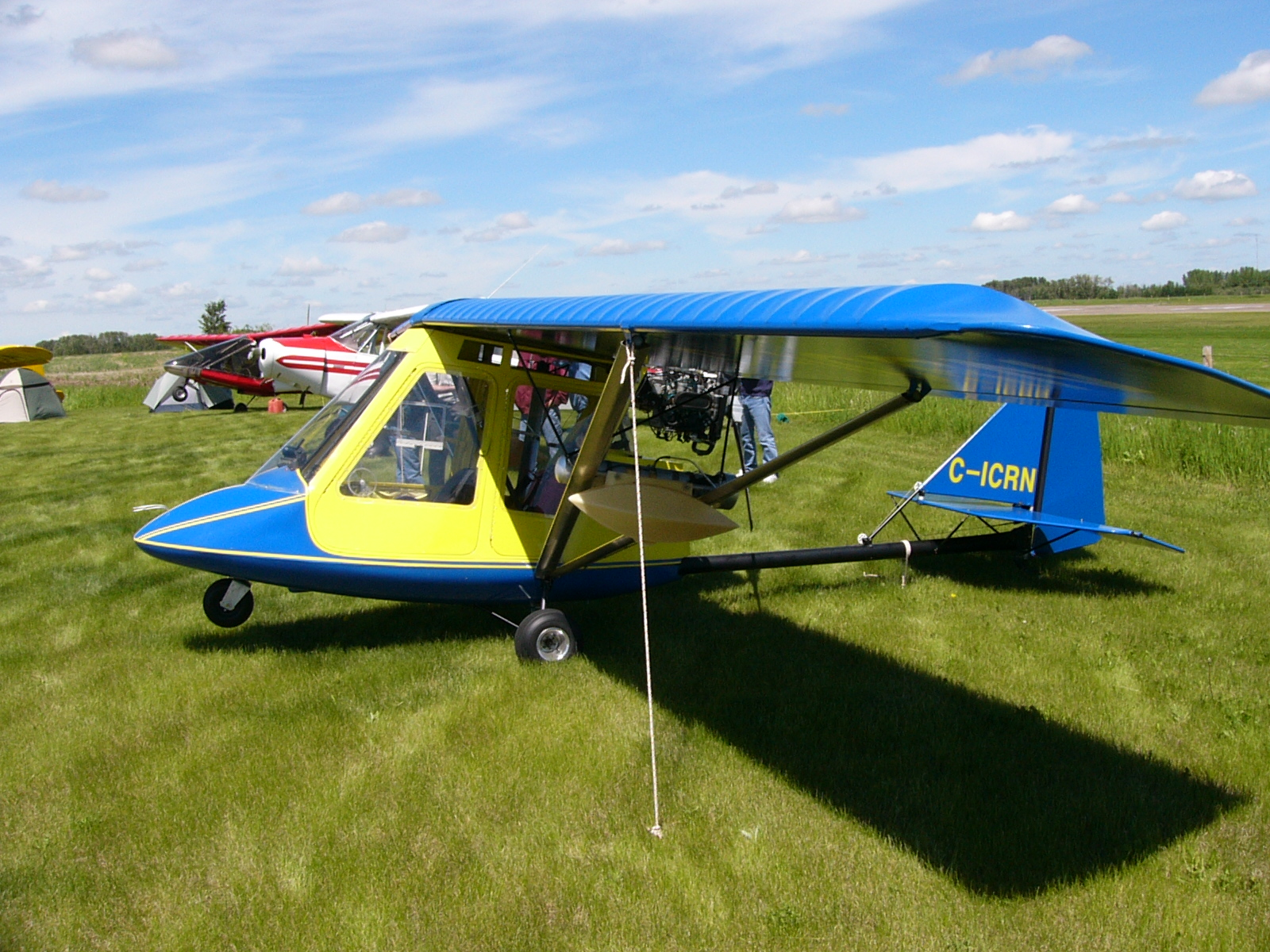
Spectrum Beaver RX 550 with home-built enclosure at the COPA Convention in Wetaskiwin, Alberta

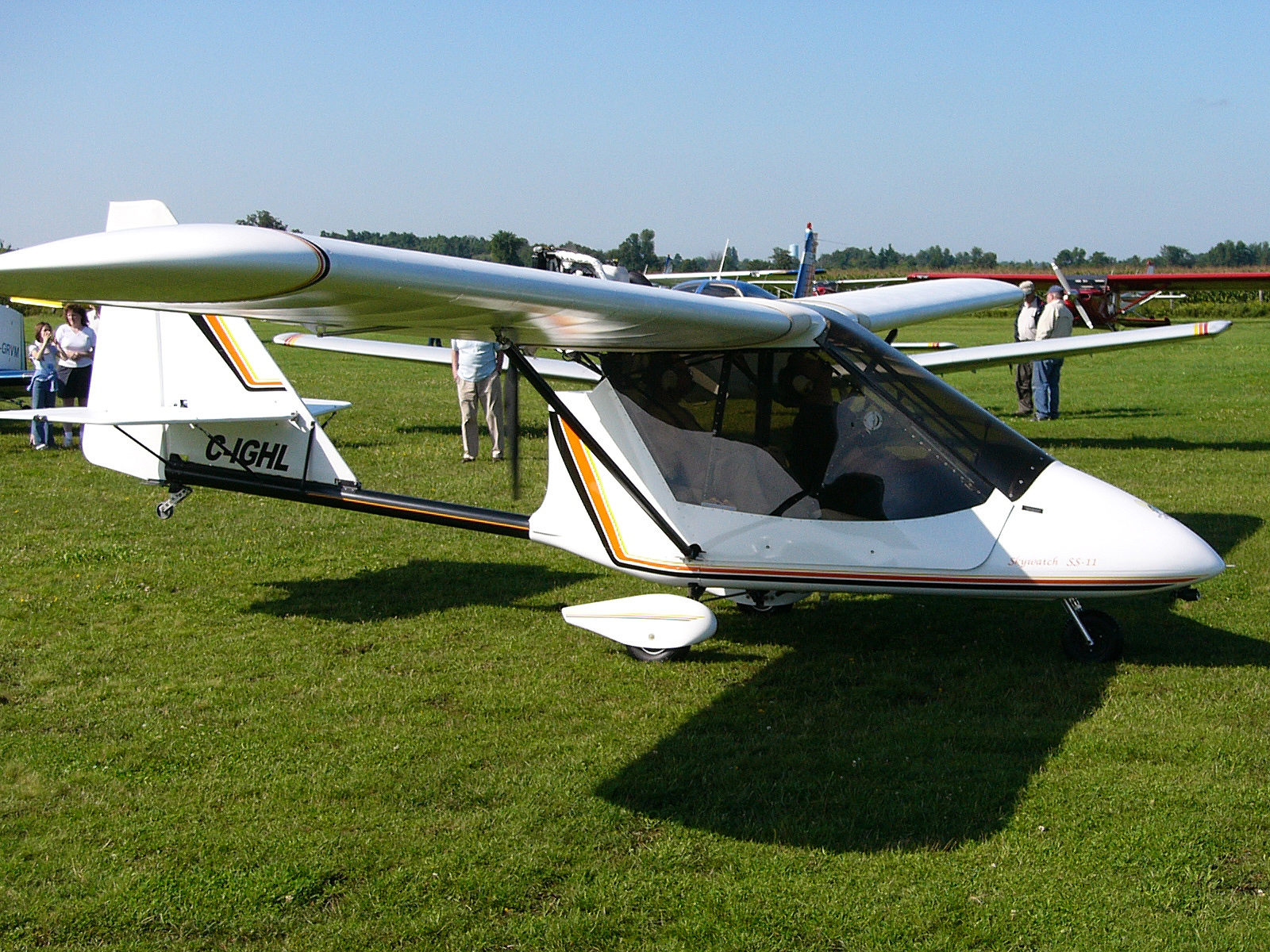
Freedom Lite Skywatch SS-11 Advanced Ultra-light Aeroplane at Alexandria, Ontario

The Spectrum Beaver is a family of single- and two-place, pusher configuration, high-wing ultralight aircraft that were designed by Larry Croome and first introduced by Spectrum Aircraft of Surrey, British Columbia, Canada, in 1983.

Beaver ultralights have evolved as designs over time, have been produced by several companies and remain in production in the 21st century.

== Development ==
The first model Beaver was the RX-28, a simple lightweight single-seat aircraft that was intended to comply with the US FAR 103 Ultralight Vehicles category, including the category's maximum 254 lb (115 kg) empty weight. The model designation indicated that it was Rotax-28 hp as it was powered by the 28 hp (21 kW) Rotax 277 single-cylinder, two-stroke powerplant. With this engine the RX-28 had an empty weight of 232 lb (105 kg).

The availability of the 35 hp (26 kW) Rotax 377 engine led to a higher-powered version of the RX-28, which was designated the RX-35. This Beaver model was fitted with floats and continued in production by Spectrum Aircraft until they ceased business in 1992. The RX-35 was a predictable and extremely nimble flyer with a respectable roll rate. Not designed with the intentions of negative flight, the RX-35 was flown very aggressively -yet excellently including light negative loadings by a highly skilled pilot named Dennis Maitlin(spelling?). There is an older video depicting a student out of control, showing his high skill doing fantastic maneuvers including inverted -however much too close to the ground and not a good example of responsible flight.

Building on the success of the single-seat Beaver models, Spectrum Aircraft introduced the two-place Beaver RX 550 in December 1984. The fuselage was shown at an ultralight trade show in Los Angeles and test flown in February 1985. It quickly became the most popular ultralight trainer in Canada. The combination of its predictable and docile handling, along with the reliable Rotax 503 50 hp (37 kW) engine, ensured its success. Larry Croome left Spectrum Aircraft Inc in 1986. Up to year 1990 more than 1800 kits were delivered around the world including Africa.

Intending to improve on the RX 550, Spectrum introduced the Beaver RX 650 in 1991, intending to place it in the Advanced Ultra-light Aeroplane category (AULA) in Canada. The RX 650 has doors that fold upwards, making it ideal for use on floats. The cockpit cage was changed to welded steel tube, from the previously used aluminum, and a sprung tailwheel was added. In service, the 650 quickly proved to have structural issues and its acceptance in the AULA category was rescinded by Transport Canada until the issues could be rectified. Most customer 650s were kept flying by operating them in the Basic Ultra-light Aeroplane category. Spectrum Aircraft went out of business in 1992, prior to rectifying the issues with the 650.

A new company, Beaver RX Enterprises acquired the design and commenced production of the RX 550, placing it in the AULA category. They did not produce the single-seaters or the RX 650. Despite demand for the Beaver, the company soon went out of business.

Fun Flight Inc of Alexandria, Virginia, United States, also produced the RX550 model in the late 1990s.

In 1995, Aircraft Sales and Parts (ASAP) of Vernon, British Columbia, purchased the Beaver tooling and redesigned the RX 550. The new version, designated the RX 550 Plus, incorporated a new wing with a greater number of wing ribs and standard aircraft fabric replacing the Dacron covering. The ASAP RX 550 Plus remains in production and available in kit form. It can be registered in the Canadian Basic and Advanced ultralight categories as well as in the US and Canadian amateur-built aircraft categories. By the end of 2007, a total of 2000 RX 550s had been produced by all manufacturers.

In 1996, a new company, Freedom Lite of Walton, Ontario, reintroduced the Beaver RX 650, first displaying it at Sun 'n Fun that year. The improved RX 650 incorporated 186 changes over the previous RX 650 design and the company renamed it the Freedom Lite SS-11 Skywatch. The wings use conventional aircraft fabric instead of Dacron, giving build times of about 250 hours. The company placed the aircraft in the Canadian AULA category. Freedom Lite soon went out of business, and the design was acquired by Legend Lite of New Hamburg, Ontario. This new company also closed its doors in the early 2000s.

In 2000, the manufacturer of RX 550 Plus kits, ASAP, reintroduced a single-seat version of the Beaver, designated the Beaver SS (Single Seat). This is similar to the original RX-28, but powered by a 40 hp (30 kW) Rotax 447 engine and with a wing derived from the RX 550 Plus design, with additional ribs. The new wing is covered in standard aircraft fabric and incorporates drag tubes in place of the original drag wires. The empty weight has increased somewhat to 340 lb (154 kg), putting it above the maximum empty weight for the US FAR 103 category. In Canada, it can be flown in the basic ultralight category or amateur-built. By the end of 2007, ten had been completed and flown.

== Design ==
The Beaver family of aircraft all have similar construction, with the frame fuselage constructed around a single longitudinal 6061-T6 aluminum tube that supports the tail, landing gear and seats. The wings and engine mount are similarly of 6061-T6 aluminum tube and attached to the main tube by connecting struts. The wing features aluminum tube spars and ribs. All Beavers prior to the RX 550 Plus and the SS had pre-sewn Dacron envelopes, which enabled builders to complete the kits in as little as 100 hours. The later models use conventional fabric methods and this makes the factory-claimed build times 150–200 hours for the SS and 180–200 hours to the RX 550 Plus.

All Beaver wings are swept-back and have elliptical tips. The Plus wing differs from the earlier Beaver wings in that it replaces the internal drag wires with tubes and uses many more ribs to maintain a better airfoil shape, at the cost of additional weight and complexity, but does perform even better. The SS and RX 550 Plus wings have 3/4 span ailerons. All models have conventional three-axis controls.

The landing gear is of tricycle configuration. Earlier models did not have a steerable nosewheel since the nose wheel load weight was very light and could be used a little like a tail dragger, but the SS and RX 550 Plus include this feature. Most models have independent mechanical or hydraulic brakes.

The cockpit pod enclosure is made of fiberglass and incorporates a windshield.

== Operational history ==
The Beaver has proven very popular in service, both with flight schools and private owners, due to its ruggedness and pleasant handling characteristics. ASAP owner Brent Holomis says that "The RX-550 is often used as a trainer because it's so easy to fly."

The early single seat RX-28 suffered from a problem of main tube cracking in operational service, due to the close proximity of the muffler heating the tube. This was later resolved by relocating the muffler.

== Variants ==
Beaver RX-28
Single-seat, powered by a 28 hp (21 kW) Rotax 277, produced by Spectrum Aircraft.
Beaver RX-35
Single-seat, powered by a 35 hp (26 kW) Rotax 377, produced by Spectrum Aircraft.
Beaver RX-550
Two-seat, powered by a 50 hp (37 kW) Rotax 503, produced by Spectrum Aircraft.
Beaver RX-550 Plus
Two-seat, powered by a 50 hp (37 kW) Rotax 503 or 64 hp (48 kW) Rotax 582, produced by ASAP.
Beaver RX-650
Two-seat, powered by a 50 hp (37 kW) Rotax 503 or 64 hp (48 kW) Rotax 582, produced by Spectrum Aircraft and Beaver RX Enterprises.
SS-11 Skywatch
Two-seat, powered by a 50 hp (37 kW) Rotax 503 or 64 hp (48 kW) Rotax 582, produced by Freedom Lite and Legend Lite.
Beaver SS
Single-seat, powered by a 40 hp (30 kW) Rotax 447, 50 hp (37 kW) Rotax 503 or 45 hp (34 kW) Zanzottera MZ 201, produced by ASAP.

== Aircraft on display ==
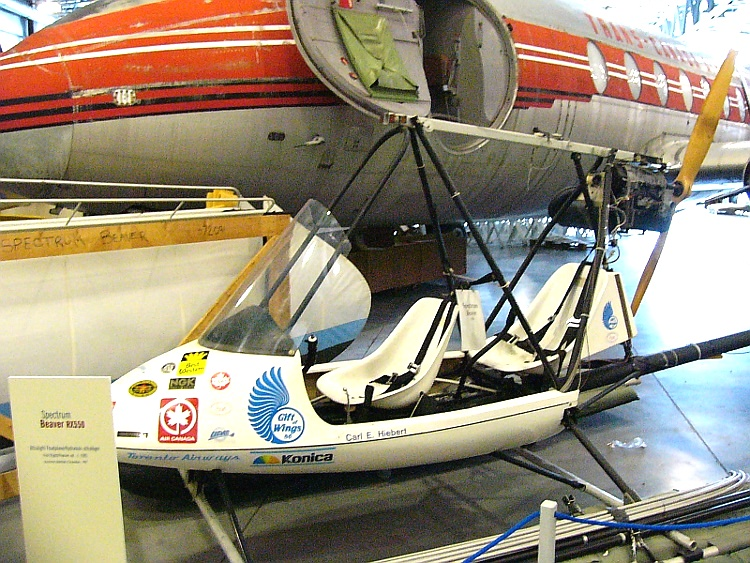
Carl Hiebert's Beaver RX 550 on display in the Canada Aviation and Space Museum.

Spectrum Beaver RX 550 C-IGOW is on display in the storage wing of the Canada Aviation and Space Museum. In 1986 this aircraft was flown 5,000 mi (8,047 km) from Halifax to land at Expo '86 in Vancouver by Carl Hiebert, a Canadian paraplegic pilot, to raise awareness of disability issues. The story of the journey was published as a book by Hiebert under the title Gift of Wings.

== Specifications (Beaver SS) ==
Data from Cliche & ASAP

General characteristics

- Crew: one
- Capacity: 310 lb (141 kg) useful load
- Length: 17 ft 8 in (5.39 m)
- Wingspan: 31 ft 0 in (9.46 m)
- Wing area: 138 sq ft (12.8 m^{2})
- Empty weight: 340 lb (154 kg)
- Max takeoff weight: 650 lb (295 kg)
- Powerplant: 1 × Rotax 447 , 40 hp (30 kW)
- Propellers: 5 ft 0 in (1.53 m) diameter

Performance

- Maximum speed: 85 mph (138 km/h, 74 kn)
- Cruise speed: 67 mph (109 km/h, 58 kn)
- Stall speed: 30 mph (49 km/h, 26 kn)
- Never exceed speed: 90 mph (146 km/h, 78 kn)
- Range: 140 mi (227 km, 120 nmi)
- Service ceiling: 12,000 ft (3,660 m)
- Rate of climb: 800 ft/min (4.1 m/s)
- Wing loading: 4.71 lb/sq ft (23.05 kg/m^{2})
- Power/mass: 16.25 lb/hp (0.102 kW/kg)

== See also ==
Aircraft of comparable role, configuration, and era

- Aero-Works Aerolite 103
- Beaujon Enduro
- Birdman Chinook
- CGS Hawk
- Freebird II
- Greenwood Witch
- Joplin Tundra
- Lockwood Drifter
- Quad City Challenger
- Skyfly S-34 Skystar
- Ultraflight Lazair
- Wings of Freedom Flitplane
- Zenair Zipper
