= Walton Raceway =

Motorsport facility in Walton, Ontario

Home of the TransCan
- Location: One Km east of Duff's United Church at Walton, Ontario, Canada
- Coordinates: 43.67930°N 81.28769°W
- Owner: Chris & Judy Lee
- Operator: Tite Racing Promotions Inc.
- Broke ground: 1970
- Opened: 1972
- Major events: Closed course offroad motocycles, ATVs and trucks
- Website: http://www.waltonraceway.ca

Walton Raceway is an off road vehicle motorsport park located just outside the hamlet of Walton, part of the Municipality of Huron East in Huron County Ontario, Canada. It is on a 200-acre site which includes several ponds, wetlands, reforested areas, hardwood forest, rolling hills and an agricultural acreage owned by the Lee family since 1965.

The race track began operating in the early 1970s as the home track for the Maitland Dirt Riders club. During that period, CMA sanctioned motocross events were organized and were held at the track in the early 1990s.

In 1992, the concept of a multi day Grand National Championship was implemented for the first time. It was modeled after the Loretta Lynn US national championship held annually in Hurricane Mills, Tennessee. It is currently called the TransCan Grand National Championship. The TransCan is acknowledged as the biggest outdoor motocross in Canada Scheduled for 13–17 August 2019.

Walton Raceway has been a featured location for television production since 1995 on TSN and subsequently on Global TV, Sportsnet, FUEL TV and ESPN2. A Rick Mercer Report feature was aired on CBC in 2009 in which Rick Mercer is given a quick course in how to ride and then sent out to compete with a group of youngsters.

Each year the Huron Tourism Association (HTA) recognizes a member who has demonstrated leadership, creative invention, partnership initiative, community impact and excellence in the tourism industry. In 2011, following nomination by the Municipality of Huron East, the Tourism Development award was presented to Walton Raceway.

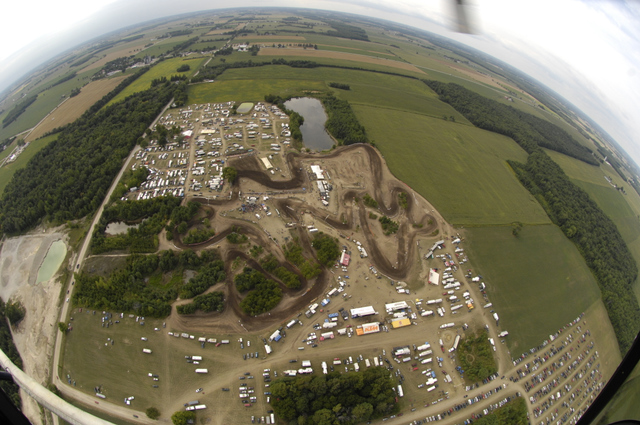
Looking west across the track property, the village of Walton is in the upper left of the picture

In 2012, Walton Raceway welcomed new additions to the property in order to provide further opportunities for outdoor adventure. An expanded and diversified range of activities includes RC truck racing, truck mud bogs, closed course truck racing and the Edge of Walton Challenge Course.

== Edge of Walton ==
The Edge of Walton was created to encompass ongoing environmental efforts and promotion of community health. The Challenge Course features a 45 ft high ropes tower in addition to multiple low ropes elements, creating a challenging environment full of unique movement opportunities. The programs facilitated through Edge of Walton also promote environmental advocacy. The Challenge Course, located on Walton Raceway property, is surrounded by multiple ponds and wetland area, housing many ecosystems that are often a feature of the nature programming provided to visitors. Edge of Walton Challenge Course is a stimulating environment that allows local youth and adults to explore their physical potential, team-working skills, and creativity in an outdoor setting. The physical component is accompanied by the focus on environmental pursuits, as visitors experience the sustainability movement created by Walton Raceway and Edge of Walton.

== Notable participants ==
- Mike Alessi
- Jolene Van Vugt
- Travis Pastrana
- Blair Morgan
- Jean Sebastien Roy
- Dusty Klatt
- Jason Lawrence
- John Dowd
- Julien Bill MX3 World Champion
- Mike Jones
- Andy Bell
- Seth Enslow

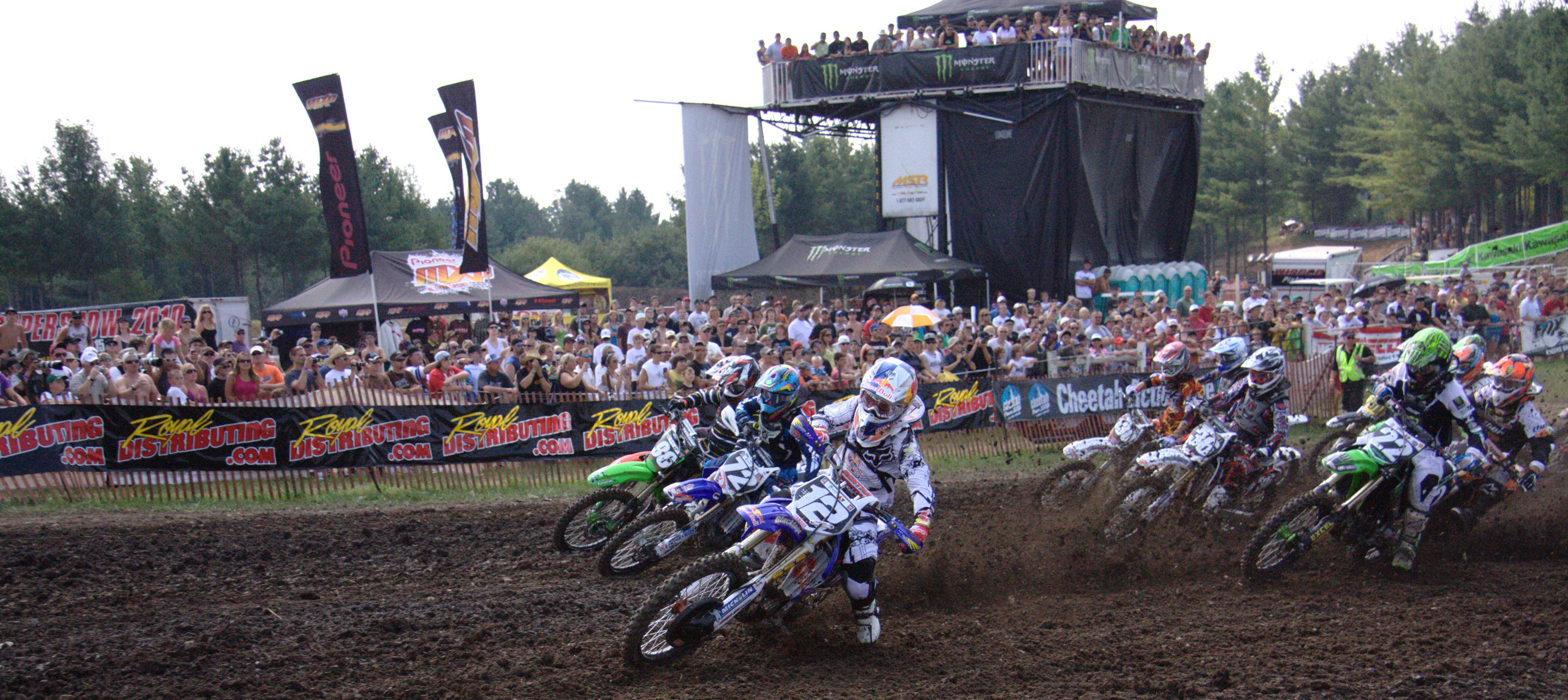
Walton Raceway's first corner – Blackfoot Yamaha's Tyler Medaglia leads the charge in the MX2 Pro National at the 2008 TransCan GNC

- Tucker Hibbert (multi time champ at X-Games )
