= Greenwood Witch =

American ultralight aircraft

Witch

General information
- Type: Ultralight aircraft
- National origin: United States
- Manufacturer: Marvin Greenwood
- Designer: Marvin Greenwood
- Status: Production completed

History
- Introduction date: 1982

The Greenwood Witch is an American ultralight aircraft that was designed and produced by Marvin Greenwood. The aircraft was supplied as a kit for amateur construction.

== Design and development ==
The Witch was designed to comply with the US FAR 103 Ultralight Vehicles rules, including the category's maximum empty weight of 254 lb (115 kg). The aircraft has a standard empty weight of 248 lb (112 kg). It features a strut-braced high-wing, T-tail, a single-seat, open cockpit, tricycle landing gear and a single engine in pusher configuration.

The aircraft is of mixed construction, including bolted-together aluminum tubing, 4130 steel tubing, wood and dope and aircraft fabric. Its 30 ft (9.1 m) span wing is supported by a single lift strut per side, with jury struts, and incorporates a unique folding mechanism. The wing folds by first hinging the outer panels onto the inner panels and then the whole wing pivots on a central steel post to allow positioning fore-and-aft for towing on its landing gear or for storage.

The Witch accommodates its pilot on an open seat, with a small cockpit fairing with a windshield. The controls are conventional three-axis, with half-span ailerons and an all-flying stabilator. The tricycle landing gear features nose wheel steering and includes a small tail caster. The standard engine supplied was the Zenoah G-25 single cylinder, two-stroke aircraft engine of 22 hp (16 kW). The engine is mounted underneath the center of the wing and drives the pusher propeller though a short extension shaft.

== Specifications (Witch) ==
Data from Cliche and the Virtual Ultralight Museum

General characteristics

- Crew: one
- Length: 18 ft 2 in (5.54 m)
- Wingspan: 30 ft (9.1 m)
- Wing area: 150 sq ft (14 m^{2})
- Empty weight: 248 lb (112 kg)
- Gross weight: 500 lb (227 kg)
- Fuel capacity: 5 U.S. gallons (19 L; 4.2 imp gal)
- Powerplant: 1 × Zenoah G-25 single cylinder, two-stroke aircraft engine, 22 hp (16 kW)

Performance

- Maximum speed: 63 mph (101 km/h, 55 kn)
- Cruise speed: 50 mph (80 km/h, 43 kn)
- Stall speed: 26 mph (42 km/h, 23 kn)
- Service ceiling: 14,000 ft (4,300 m)
- g limits: +3.8/-2
- Rate of climb: 500 ft/min (2.5 m/s)
- Wing loading: 3.33 lb/sq ft (16.3 kg/m^{2})

== See also ==
Aircraft of comparable role, configuration, and era

- Spectrum Beaver
