= Hill Hummer =

Hummer

General information
- Type: Recreational ultralight
- National origin: United States
- Manufacturer: Homebuilt
- Designer: Klaus Hill

History
- First flight: November 1977

The Hill Hummer, also known as the Maxair Hummer, was an open-cockpit ultralight aircraft developed in the United States in the late 1970s. An extremely minimalist design, the main structural element of the aircraft was a length of 5-inch aluminium irrigation pipe. At one end of this pipe was the pilot's seat, and at the other end, a V-tail. Behind the pilot's seat, an aluminium truss structure supported a fabric parasol wing, which was further braced with wires to another truss element that served as a kingpost above it. The engine was mounted pusher-wise at the rear of the wing truss, the length of the mounting to be selected by the builder to balance the weight of the pilot.

The Hummer won the award for Best Workmanship at the EAA Fly-in in 1978, and was marketed as plans and in kit form by Maxair after Hill's death.

== Specifications (typical) ==
General characteristics

- Crew: One pilot
- Length: 18 ft 0 in (5.49 m)
- Wingspan: 34 ft 0 in (10.36 m)
- Height: 8 ft 0 in (2.44 m)
- Wing area: 128 sq ft (11.9 m^{2})
- Empty weight: 170 lb (80 kg)
- Gross weight: 370 lb (170 kg)
- Powerplant: 1 × Zenoah G25 , 20 hp (15 kW)

Performance

- Maximum speed: 50 mph (80 km/h, 43 kn)
