= Mitchell Wing B-10 =

American ultralight aircraft

B-10
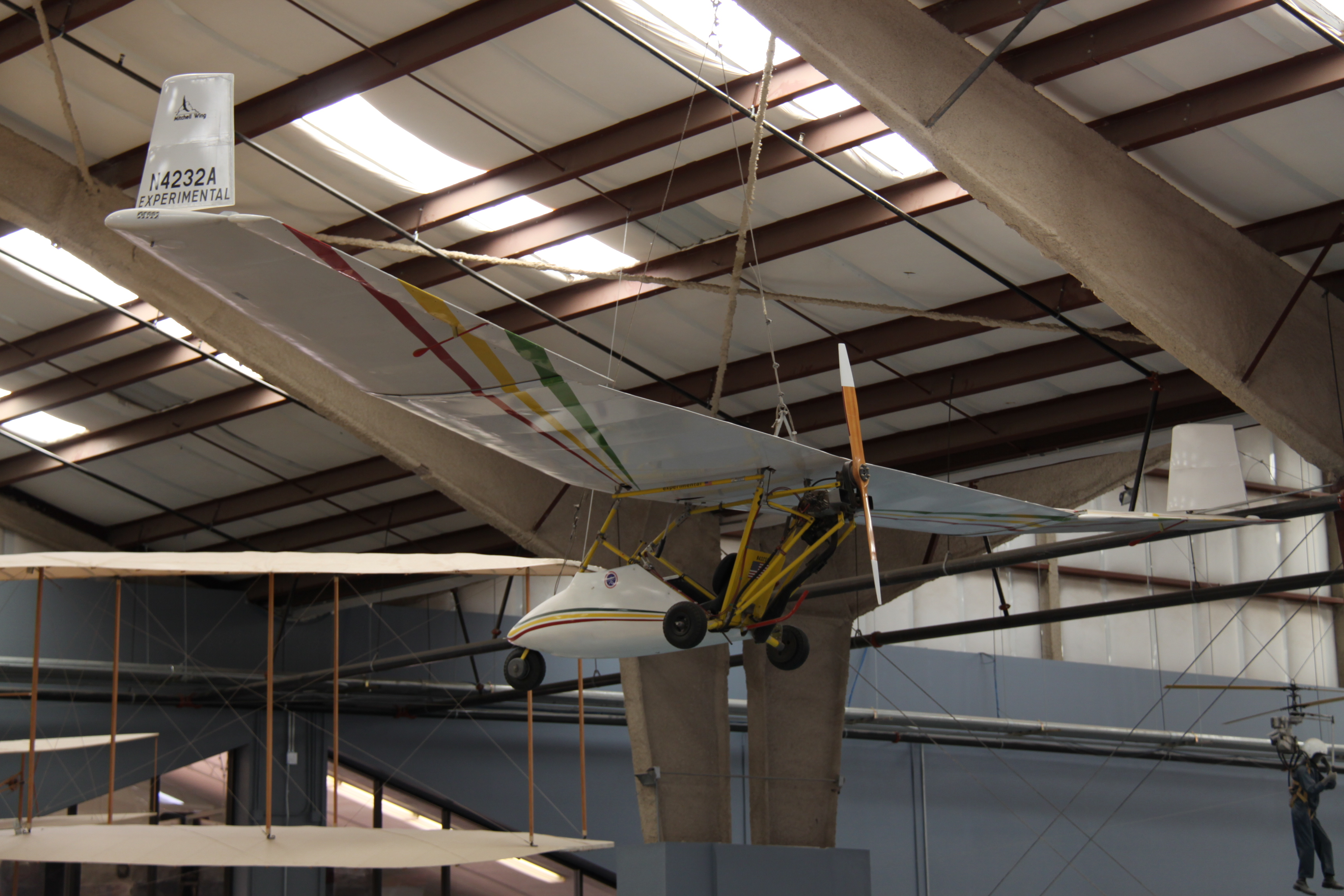
- Mitchell Wing B-10 at Pima Air & Space Museum

General information
- Type: Ultralight aircraft and motor glider
- National origin: United States
- Manufacturer: US Pacific
- Designer: Don Mitchell
- Status: Plans available (2012)

History
- Introduction date: mid-1980s
- First flight: 1980
- Variants: AmeriPlanes Mitchell Wing A-10; Mitchell U-2 Superwing

The Mitchell Wing B-10 is an American high-wing, open cockpit, single-seat, tailless, ultralight aircraft and motor glider designed by Don Mitchell and based on his Mitchell Wing hang-glider. It has been produced by a variety of companies in the form of kits and plans for amateur construction. It first flew in 1980.

In 2012 the aircraft was still available in the form of plans and some materials, offered by US Pacific of Fresno, California.

== Design and development ==
The Mitchell Wing started off as a foot-launched hang glider with good soaring performance. Mitchell later modified the design into a powered ultralight aircraft with wheeled tricycle landing gear, known as the B-10. The B-10F is a foot-launched variant with only two wheels. The B-10 was designed to comply with the US FAR 103 Ultralight Vehicles rules, including the category's maximum empty weight of 254 lb (115 kg). The aircraft has a standard empty weight of 245 lb (111 kg).

The B-10's fuselage is made from aluminum tubing while the wing has a birch plywood D-cell leading edge and foam ribs, covered with Dacron sailcloth or doped aircraft fabric. The tailless wing is common to all three variants. It is of tapered and lightly swept form, employing a NACA 23015 airfoil. It has a span of 36 ft (11.0 m) span wing, area of 136 sq ft (12.6 m^{2}), aspect ratio of 8:1. The 8.5 ft (2.6 m) outboard wing panels have 6 degrees of dihedral and the wing overall has 12 degrees of sweep. The controls are conventional three-axis, comprising trailing elevons and wing tip mounted vertical rudders, and operated via a top-mounted centre stick.

Power is provided by a single engine in pusher configuration, mounted behind the pilot's seat. Small engines in the 20 to 30 hp (15 to 22 kW) range can be used: The prototype was fitted with a 12 hp (9 kW) McCulloch MC101, with Chrysler West Bend and McCulloch two-strokes being recommended. and the Zenoah G-25 of 22 hp (16 kW) has been fitted.

Construction time for the supplied plans is estimated at 500 hours.

The B-10 can be quickly disassembled for ground transport or storage. The outer wing panels fold or can be removed, the fuselage cage is detachable and the tip rudders are quickly removed.

The B-10 was subsequently developed into the A-10 and two-seat T-10 and the mid-wing Mitchell U-2 Superwing.

== Aircraft on display ==
- US Southwest Soaring Museum

== Specifications (B-10) ==
Data from World Directory of Leisure Aviation 2011-12 and US Pacific

General characteristics

- Crew: one
- Length: 8 ft (2.4 m)
- Wingspan: 34 ft (10 m)
- Height: 4 ft (1.2 m)
- Wing area: 136 sq ft (12.6 m^{2})
- Aspect ratio: 8:1
- Airfoil: NACA 23015
- Empty weight: 245 lb (111 kg)
- Gross weight: 595 lb (270 kg)
- Fuel capacity: 5 litres (1.1 imp gal; 1.3 US gal)
- Powerplant: 1 × Zenoah G-25 two stroke aircraft engine, 22 hp (16 kW)
- Propellers: 2-bladed Wooden fixed pitch, 4 ft 2 in (1.27 m) diameter

Performance

- Maximum speed: 65 mph (105 km/h, 56 kn)
- Cruise speed: 60 mph (97 km/h, 52 kn)
- Stall speed: 25 mph (40 km/h, 22 kn)
- Service ceiling: 12,000 ft (3,700 m)
- g limits: +4/-4
- Maximum glide ratio: 16:1
- Rate of climb: 600 ft/min (3.0 m/s)
- Wing loading: 4.4 lb/sq ft (21 kg/m^{2})

== See also ==
- List of gliders
