= Skyfly S-34 Skystar =

Swiss ultralight aircraft

S-34 Skystar

General information
- Type: Ultralight aircraft
- National origin: Switzerland
- Manufacturer: Skyfly
- Designer: Hans Gygax
- Status: In production (2012)

The Skyfly S-34 Skystar is a Swiss ultralight aircraft designed by Hans Gygax and produced by Skyfly of Altbüron.

The aircraft is supplied either as a kit for amateur construction or as a complete ready-to-fly aircraft.

== Design and development ==
The S-34 Skystar is a lightweight ultralight aircraft intended for recreational flying. It is designed to comply with international ultralight regulations and is available in both kit-built and factory-built versions.

== Design and development ==
The Skystar features a strut-braced high-wing, a two-seats-in-tandem open cockpit with a windshield, fixed tricycle landing gear with optional wheel pants and a single engine in pusher configuration.

The aircraft is made from bolted-together aluminum tubing, with its flying surfaces covered in Dacron sailcloth. A fibreglass cockpit fairing is available. Its 9.60 m (31.5 ft) span wing has an area of 14.6 m^{2} (157 sq ft) and is supported by V-struts and jury struts. The standard engine available is the 64 hp (48 kW) Rotax 582 two-stroke powerplant.

== Specifications (S-34 Skystar) ==
Data from Bayerl

General characteristics

- Crew: one
- Capacity: one passenger
- Wingspan: 9.60 m (31 ft 6 in)
- Wing area: 14.6 m^{2} (157 sq ft)
- Empty weight: 159 kg (351 lb)
- Gross weight: 380 kg (838 lb)
- Fuel capacity: 44 litres (9.7 imp gal; 12 US gal)
- Powerplant: 1 × Rotax 582 twin cylinder, liquid-cooled, two stroke aircraft engine, 48 kW (64 hp)

Performance

- Maximum speed: 130 km/h (81 mph, 70 kn)
- Cruise speed: 120 km/h (75 mph, 65 kn)
- Stall speed: 50 km/h (31 mph, 27 kn)
- Rate of climb: 5.5 m/s (1,080 ft/min)
- Wing loading: 26.0 kg/m^{2} (5.3 lb/sq ft)

== See also ==
Similar aircraft

- Spectrum Beaver
