= Don Mitchell (aircraft designer) =

American aircraft designer (1915–1993)

Donald Mitchell (1915 – 1993) was an American aircraft designer. He was a Scottish immigrant, arriving in the United States in 1922. He built his first airplane seven years later and founded an airplane manufacturing company in 1937.

== Aircraft designed ==
- Mitchell Nimbus
- Mitchell U-2 Superwing
- AmeriPlanes Mitchell Wing A-10
- Mitchell Wing B-10
