= Ritz Model A =

American ultralight aircraft

Model A
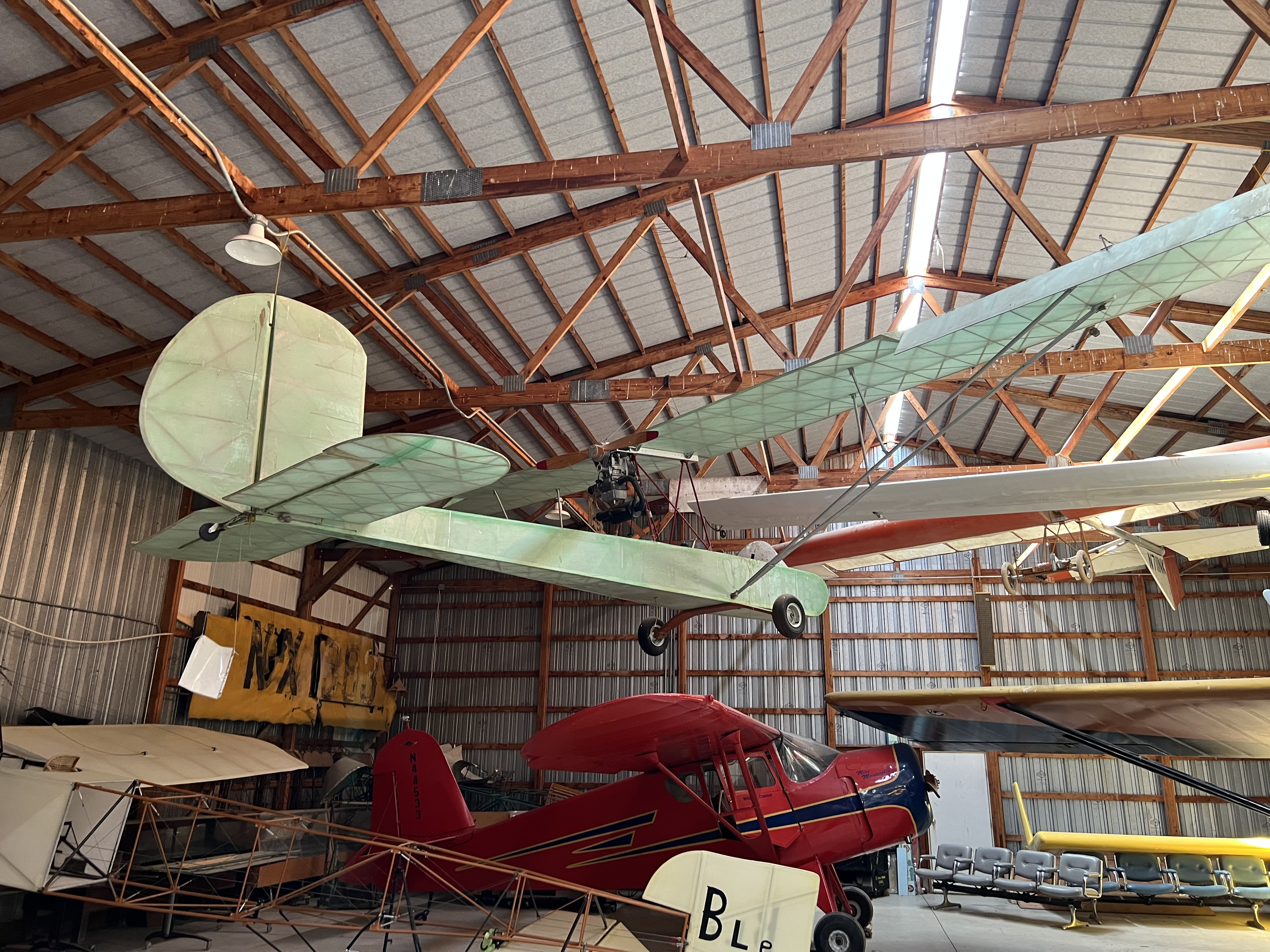

General information
- Type: Ultralight aircraft
- National origin: United States
- Designer: Gerry Ritz
- Status: Production completed

History
- Introduction date: 1984

The Ritz Model A is an American ultralight aircraft that was designed by Gerry Ritz in 1984 and supplied in the form of plans for amateur construction.

The aircraft is noted because the designer died while test flying the aircraft, due to a design flaw.

== Design and development ==
The Model A was designed as a very low-cost aircraft to comply with the US FAR 103 Ultralight Vehicles rules, including the category's maximum empty weight of 254 lb (115 kg). The aircraft has a standard empty weight of 200 lb (91 kg). It features a strut-braced parasol-wing, a single-seat, open cockpit, conventional landing gear and a single engine in pusher configuration.

The aircraft is made predominately from wood, with some steel and aluminum also used. The fuselage is formed as a wooden geodetic lattice structure. Its 36 ft (11.0 m) span wing is supported by a single lift strut per side, with jury struts and cabane struts. The aircraft is covered in doped aircraft fabric. The pilot is accommodated in the open cockpit, with an optional windshield. The powerplant, specified as a 22 hp (16 kW) single cylinder, two stroke, carburetted Zenoah G-25 aircraft engine, is mounted behind the pilot and behind the wing, above the fuselage. The main landing gear legs are built from wood laminations. The wings and tailplane can be removed in 20 minutes by two people to permit ground transportation by trailer or for storage.

The controls are conventional, but limited in pitch and roll authority, bringing a recommendation by reviewer Andre Cliche not to fly the Model A in windy or turbulent conditions.

The designer was flight testing the prototype Model A when it suffered wing aeroelastic flutter. Ritz was killed in the subsequent crash. The flutter was traced to the aileron hinge design, which was later modified to address the issue.

== Specifications (Model A) ==
Data from Cliche

General characteristics

- Crew: one
- Wingspan: 36 ft (11 m)
- Wing area: 140 sq ft (13 m^{2})
- Empty weight: 200 lb (91 kg)
- Gross weight: 450 lb (204 kg)
- Fuel capacity: 5 U.S. gallons (19 L; 4.2 imp gal)
- Powerplant: 1 × Zenoah G-25 single cylinder, two stroke, carburetted aircraft engine, 22 hp (16 kW)

Performance

- Maximum speed: 62 mph (100 km/h, 54 kn)
- Cruise speed: 45 mph (72 km/h, 39 kn)
- Stall speed: 18 mph (29 km/h, 16 kn)
- g limits: +4.5
- Rate of climb: 400 ft/min (2.0 m/s)
- Wing loading: 3.21 lb/sq ft (15.7 kg/m^{2})
