= Cascade Kasperwing I-80 =

American ultralight airplane

Kasperwing 180
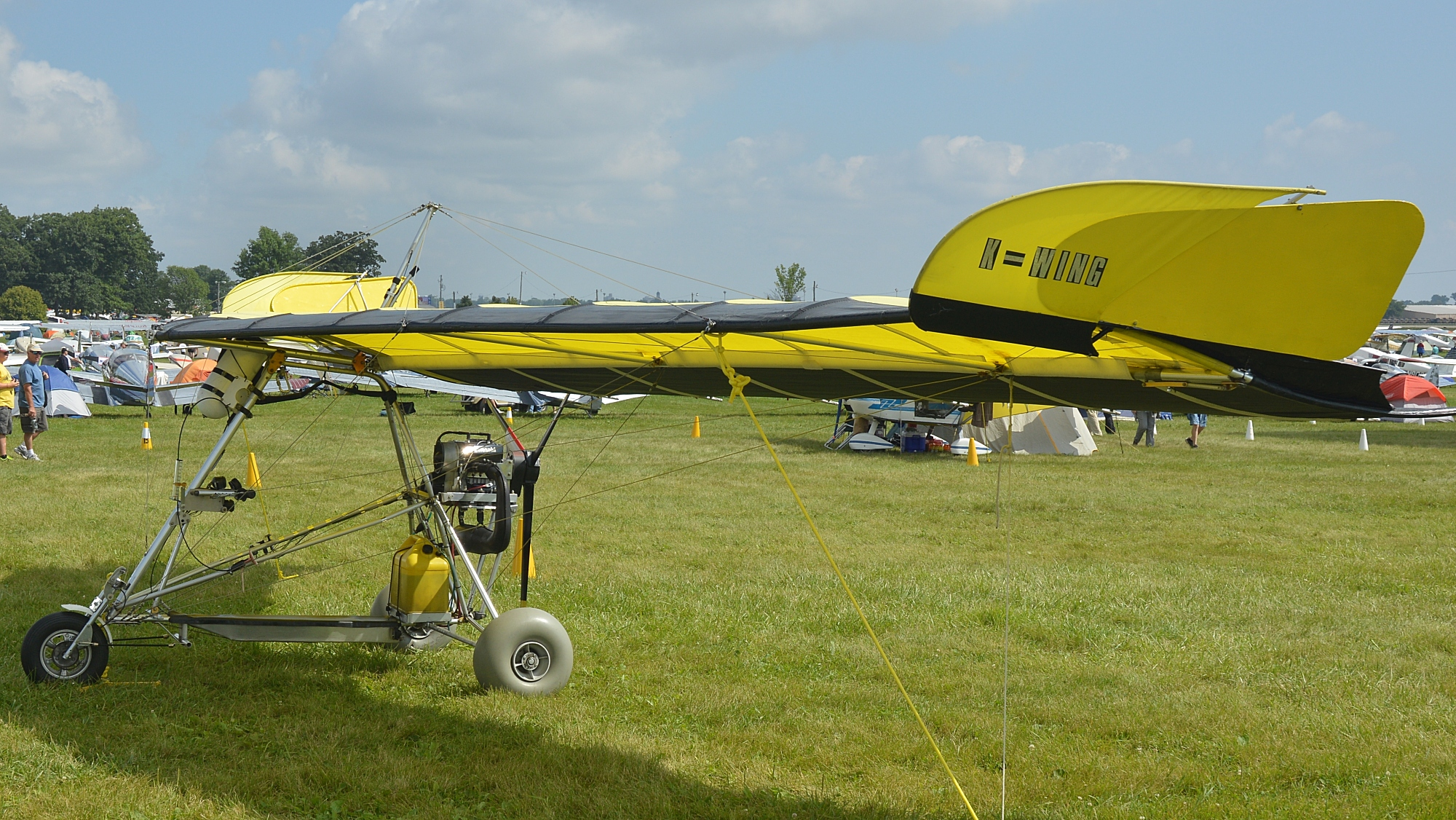

General information
- Type: Ultralight motorglider
- National origin: United States
- Manufacturer: Cascade Ultralites
- Designer: Witold Kasper and Steve Grossruck
- Status: Production completed

History
- Introduction date: 1976

The Cascade Kasperwing 180 is an American ultralight flying wing motorglider that was designed by Witold Kasper and Steve Grossruck. It was produced by Cascade Ultralites and introduced in 1976. The aircraft was supplied as a kit for amateur construction.

== Design and development ==
The 180 was designed long before the US FAR 103 Ultralight Vehicles rules were introduced, but the aircraft fits into the category, including the category's maximum empty weight of 254 lb (115 kg). The aircraft has a standard empty weight of 160 lb (73 kg). It features a cable--braced high-wing, a single-seat, open cockpit, tricycle landing gear and a single engine in pusher configuration.

The aircraft is made from bolted together aluminum tubing, with the wing Dacron sailcloth covered. Its 35 ft (10.7 m) span, single-surface wing employs a special Kasper-designed airfoil that allows both normal flight and a fully controlled, completely stalled parachutal descent mode. The wing is cable-braced from a single kingpost. The pilot is accommodated in a nylon-web swing seat. The controls are unconventional, with pitch controlled by weight shift and roll and yaw controlled by canted-outwards wing tip rudders. The powerplant is a Zenoah G-25 of 20 hp (15 kW). The landing gear is of tricycle configuration, with a steerable nosewheel that has reversed controls; the pilot pushes the right pedal to go left and vice versa.

The aircraft achieves a glide ratio of 10:1 at 23 mph (37 km/h).

The 180 can be fully disassembled for transport, including reducing the wing to a compact bag of tubing, while the fuselage cage remains assembled

== Variants ==
180
Initial open cockpit model, without a windshield
180 BX
Enclosed cockpit version

== Aircraft on display ==
- US Southwest Soaring Museum

== Specifications (180) ==
Data from Cliche and the Virtual Ultralight Museum

General characteristics

- Crew: one
- Length: 10 ft (3.0 m)
- Wingspan: 35 ft (11 m)
- Height: 11 ft (3.4 m)
- Wing area: 180 sq ft (17 m^{2})
- Empty weight: 160 lb (73 kg)
- Gross weight: 380 lb (172 kg)
- Fuel capacity: 2.5 U.S. gallons (9.5 L; 2.1 imp gal)
- Powerplant: 1 × Zenoah G-25 single cylinder, two-stroke engine, 20 hp (15 kW)
- Propellers: 2-bladed wooden

Performance

- Maximum speed: 45 mph (72 km/h, 39 kn)
- Cruise speed: 35 mph (56 km/h, 30 kn)
- Stall speed: 18 mph (29 km/h, 16 kn) (at this speed enters into parachute descent mode)
- Range: 85 mi (137 km, 74 nmi)
- Service ceiling: 15,000 ft (4,600 m)
- g limits: +7/-4
- Maximum glide ratio: 10:1 at 23 mph (37 km/h)
- Rate of climb: 800 ft/min (4.1 m/s)
