= Jean Sebastien Roy =

Canadian motorcycle racer

Jean Sebastien Roy, also known as JSR, is a Canadian professional motocross rider and has won five CMRC Canadian National Motocross Championships dating from 2001-2005.

Roy was born and raised in Acton Vale, Quebec.

Roy competed in the USA as a privateer for a number of years, where he raced both the AMA Motocross and Supercross classes. His strongest AMA season was 1998, where he finished ninth overall for the season as a full privateer Kawasaki rider. Unfortunately, Roy was unable to secure a full factory ride after that, and switched between several private Honda teams. In 2001, after having a lackluster season in the US, he decided to become fully dedicated to the Canadian National Series (CMRC).

Since his return to Canada, Roy has won his five consecutive 250 championships, as well as a handful of Montreal Supercrosses. Roy has proven extremely competitive during his part-time forays in the AMA championship, regularly showing top-ten speed on production-based, 2-stroke equipment.

In an intense championship battle, Roy lost the 2006 MX1 championship to his Blackfoot Honda teammate Dusty Klatt, but finished ahead of teammate and longtime rival Blair Morgan. Both racers were on Honda CRF450 four stroke machines, and it was the first season on one for both.

- 2001 CMRC 250 National Champion
- 2002 CMRC 250 National Champion
- 2003 CMRC 250 National Champion
- 2004 CMRC 250 National Champion
- 2005 CMRC MX1 National Champion

2007 would see Blackfoot switch to Yamaha motorcycles. While still a regular winner, Roy suffered some bike problems and injuries that set him back to fifth in the standings. It would be his last year of professional full-time competition.

In 2008, Roy competed in just a single CMRC national event, and announced that the upcoming Montreal Supercross would be his final pro race. To the delight of the hometown crowd, Roy led wire-to-wire and claimed the victory, capping off a stellar career.
