= AmeriPlanes Mitchell Wing A-10 =

American cantilever aircraft

Mitchell Wing A-10
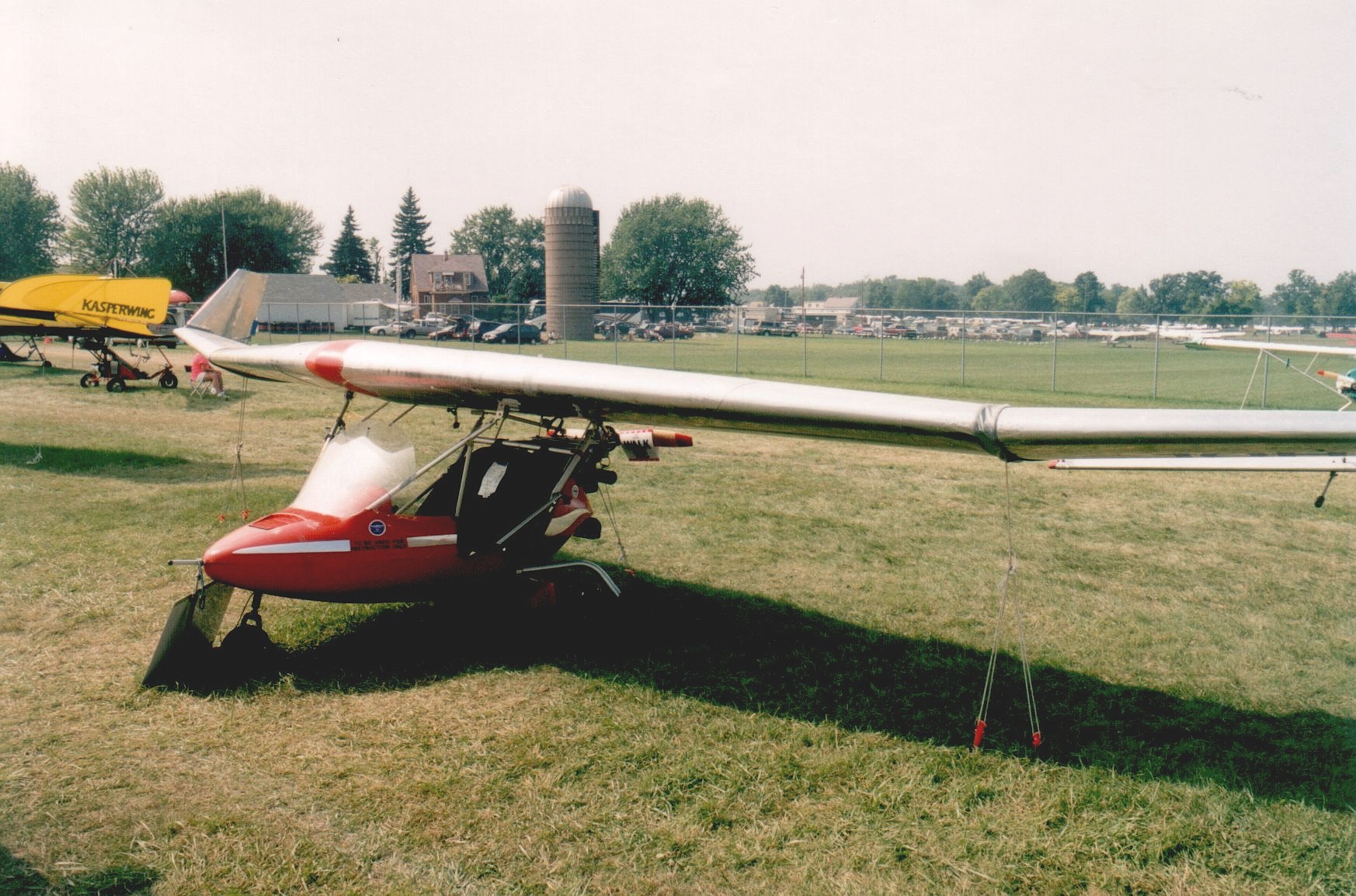
- A-10

General information
- Type: Ultralight aircraft
- National origin: United States
- Manufacturer: AmeriPlanes
- Designer: Don Mitchell
- Status: Production completed
- Number built: A-10: 364 (1999); T-10: 150 (1999)

History
- Introduction date: 1982
- First flight: 1982
- Developed from: Mitchell Wing B-10
- Variant: Mitchell U-2 Superwing

The Mitchell Wing A-10 and T-10 are a family of American cantilever, tricycle landing gear, high-wing, pusher configuration, one and two seat ultralight aircraft designed for amateur construction or supplied as completed aircraft. The aircraft were designed by Don Mitchell and were produced by a number of companies, the last being AmeriPlanes of Truro, Iowa.

== Development ==
The A-10 is a 1982 development of the Mitchell Wing B-10 ultralight, itself developed from the Mitchell Wing hang glider of 1977. Their designer Don Mitchell had worked on the Northrop YB-49 bomber project. In place of the B-10's composite wing, the A-10 features a metal wing, attached in cantilever fashion to an open cockpit that can be equipped with a streamlined pod. The low-drag design results in a 16:1 glide ratio for the A-10. The aircraft can be used as a motor glider or as a cross country touring aircraft.

The wing is constructed from sheet aluminium, with a main spar in the form of a D-cell. The ribs are made from aluminium sheet and the wing is covered in the same material. The fuselage is built from aluminium tubing, riveted together. A cockpit streamlined pod was optional. The design has folding wings and was intended for trailering from the onset.

The standard engine for the A-10 is the 28 hp (21 kW) Rotax 277, but the 40 hp (30 kW) Rotax 447 and the 22 hp (16 kW) Zenoah G-25 have also been installed. Construction time of the kit was rated as 80–120 hours.

The A-10 was produced by a number of companies, including Mitchell Aircraft Corporation and Mitchell Wing, Inc. of Porterville, California, MitchellWing Aircraft Company of Kansas, Tulsa Mitchell Wing, Inc. of Tulsa, Oklahoma, Higher Planes of Dover, Kansas and lastly AmeriPlanes of Truro, Iowa. AmeriPlanes acquired the design on 15 April 1998 when Larry Smith took possession of the MitchellWing Aircraft Company. Ameriplanes was a one-person company and provided both kits and completed aircraft, but the company went out of business in the mid-2000s and the A-10 is no longer in production.

The A-10 was developed into a two-seat trainer, with side-by-side seating, designated the T-10. The T-10 incorporated three feet more wingspan and has a reduced glide ratio of 14:1.

== Variants ==
A-10
Single seat design powered by a 28 hp (21 kW) Rotax 277, 40 hp (30 kW) Rotax 447 or 22 hp (16 kW) Zenoah G-25.
A-10B Plain Jane
Basic, stripped down single seat design powered by a 22 hp (16 kW) Zenoah G-25. From the factory the model did not include the cockpit streamlining pod or other extras and was intended to comply with the US FAR 103 Ultralight Vehicles regulations, with an empty weight of 250 lb (113 kg)
A-10D
Deluxe model improved single seat design powered by a 22 hp (16 kW) Zenoah G-25.
T-10
Two seat side-by-side design powered by a 40 hp (30 kW) Rotax 447 or 50 hp (37 kW) Rotax 503.
T-10D
Deluxe model two seat side-by-side design powered by a 45 hp (34 kW) Zenoah G-50.

== Aircraft on display ==
- EAA AirVenture Museum – A-10

== Specifications (A-10) ==
Data from KitPlanes

General characteristics

- Crew: one
- Length: 9 ft 4 in (2.84 m)
- Wingspan: 34 ft 4 in (10.46 m)
- Height: 7 ft 4 in (2.24 m)
- Wing area: 134 sq ft (12.4 m^{2})
- Empty weight: 280 lb (127 kg)
- Gross weight: 553 lb (251 kg)
- Fuel capacity: 2.5 US gallons (9.5 litres)
- Powerplant: 1 × Rotax 277 single cylinder, two stroke aircraft engine, 28 hp (21 kW)

Performance

- Maximum speed: 70 mph (110 km/h, 61 kn)
- Cruise speed: 55 mph (89 km/h, 48 kn)
- Stall speed: 28 mph (45 km/h, 24 kn)
- Never exceed speed: 75 mph (121 km/h, 65 kn)
- Range: 230 mi (370 km, 200 nmi)
- Service ceiling: 12,000 ft (3,700 m)
- g limits: +6/-5.5
- Maximum glide ratio: 16:1
- Rate of climb: 800 ft/min (4.1 m/s)
- Rate of sink: 240 ft/min (1.2 m/s)
- Wing loading: 4.13 lb/sq ft (20.2 kg/m^{2})

== See also ==
Aircraft of comparable role, configuration, and era

- Pterodactyl Ascender
