= Canadian Motorsport Racing Club =

Canadian motocross racing organization

CMRC (Canadian Motorsport Racing Club) was Canada's largest motocross racing organization and a league for the top riders of the country, until its purchase by Jetwerx International Inc in 2017. Motocross in Canada would continue with Jetwerx under the new name of MRC Motorsport Racing Canada.

The Canadian Motorsport Racing Corporation is a marketing and membership driven organization committed to the growth and development of competitive off-road motorcycle racing, for amateurs and professionals, regional and national. CMRC exists to enhance, communicate and promote motocross for the benefit of participants, spectators, organizers and industry participants and thereby to ensure stability, growth and social and political acceptance of our sport.

CMRC is responsible for setting, implementing, maintaining and developing standards for rules of competition, officiating, organization and promotion of events. CMRC will seek to cultivate promotional opportunities, which are intended to be to the benefit of the overall membership.

== Notable riders ==
- Jean Sebastien Roy
- Blair Morgan
- Darcy Lange
- Dusty Klatt
