= Dusty Klatt =

Canadian motorcycle racer

- Nationality: Canadian
- Born: February 8, 1985 (age 41) Port Hardy, British Columbia, Canada

Motocross career
- Teams: Honda, Kawasaki

Dustin Klatt (born February 8, 1985) is a Canadian former professional motocross racer from Campbell River, British Columbia, Canada.

== Motocross career ==
Klatt first gained national attention in 1999 when he travelled to Walton Raceway in Walton, Ontario, to compete at the TransCan Grand National Championship and subsequently secured a national amateur title in the 250 Intermediate class. He went on to be a two-time MX2 CMRC Western Canadian Champion (2004 & 2005) and two time MX1 CMRC Canadian champion (2006 & 2010) with the Blackfoot team based out of Calgary, Alberta.

Klatt raced the 2007 AMA Supercross/Motocross season in the United States. He rode in the "Lites" class aboard a Yamaha YZ250F for Star Racing. In March, 2007, Klatt won both Pro classes at Round #1 of The Western 4-Stroke National Motocross Series in the 250F Pro and Premier Pro classes, taking home $1550 for his efforts.

For the 2008 AMA Supercross season in the United States, Klatt raced for Cernics Kawasaki on the #63 Kawasaki KX450F in the "Supercross" class. His best finish was a 13th place in the mud at Daytona. He finished the season 30th in series points despite missing the first half of the season with an injury.

Klatt returned with the Cernics Kawasaki team to race the 2008 CMRC Monster Energy Nationals in Canada in the MX1 class aboard his #111 KX450F alongside his teammate Jeff Gibson on the #3 KX450F. Klatt broke a bone in his foot at the halfway point of the series. At the conclusion of the nine round series, Klatt found himself in second place overall, 62 points behind the champion Colton Facciotti, securing the national #2 plate for 2009. Klatt's moto finishes this season were 2-13-1-3-2-7-7-3-1-7-2-6-2-2-3-3-11-5. Klatt represented Team Canada at the Motocross des Nations in fall 2008, alongside Facciotti and Medaglia.

For the 2009 season, Klatt raced with the Blackfoot Toyota Red Bull Yamaha team, joining Colton Facciotti in the MX1 class of the CMRC Canadian motocross nationals. In the nine rounds of the 2009 MX1 championship, Klatt was placed second in the points from the first round to the last round behind his teammate Colton Facciotti. His moto finishes were 2-4 3-2 1-3 2-2 3-2 10 2-2 2-4 1–3. He had one overall victory, which came in round 5, at Gopher Dunes. Round 6 consisted of only one moto due to severe weather, where Klatt managed a tenth place.

At the first round of the 2010 championship, Klatt managed to finish third in moto 1, and second in moto 2 to claim second overall on the day despite battling stomach issues. His teammate Facciotti finished in first place with a 1-1 clean sweep. At round 2 in Edmonton, Klatt suffered mechanical problems with his bike in both motos and failed to score any points. At round 3 in Calgary, Klatt benefited from a mistake that caused defending champion Facciotti to crash out of the weekends racing and not score any points, leaving Klatt to win both motos with a 1-1 clean sweep. At round 4, Klatt took second in both motos to score second overall with 2-2 results. At round 5 in Gopher Dunes, Klatt took 2-4 moto finishes for second overall once again. At round 6 in Ste. Julue, he recorded another 1-1 clean sweep to over-take the points lead while Facciotti crashed out on the first lap of moto 1. At round 7 in Moncton, New Brunswick, Klatt was victorious with a third 1-1 clean sweep and extended his moto win streak to four and points lead to 32 with only two rounds remaining. At round 8, he took the win in the first moto and finished second in the rain-soaked second moto, finishing 1-2 for second overall on the day and claiming the 2010 CMRC MX1 National championship with one round still remaining. At Walton Raceway, the final round of the 2010 CMRC Motocross Nationals, Klatt finished third and first in the two motos, claiming second overall. His moto scores this season were 3-2-DNF-DNF-1-1-2-2-2-4-1-1-1-1-1-2-3-1.
