= Mitchell U-2 Superwing =

Ultralight aircraft

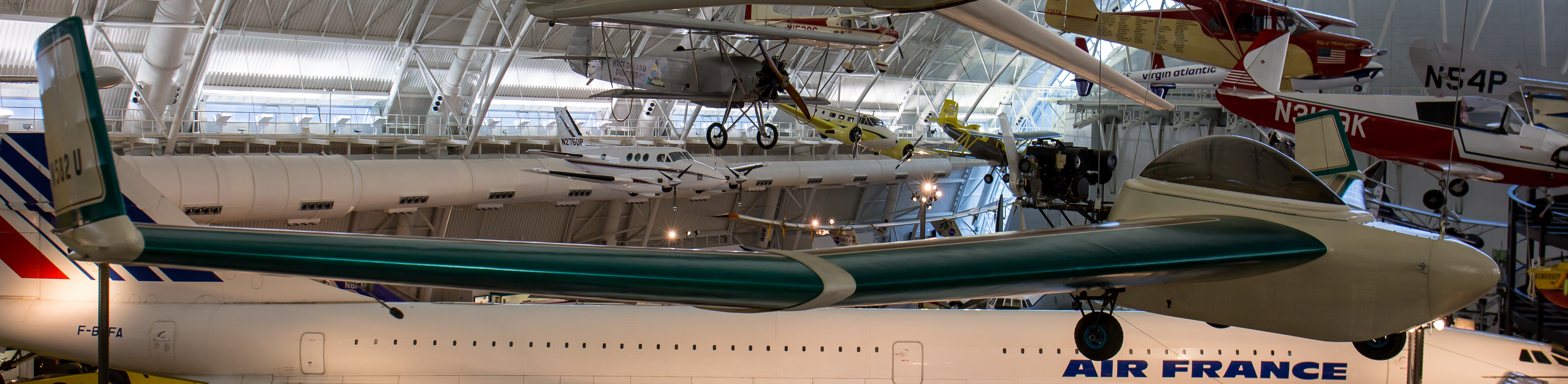
- A Mitchell U-2 superwing at the Steven F. Udvar-Hazy Center

General information
- Type: Ultralight aircraft
- National origin: United States
- Manufacturer: Mitchell Wing Company
- Designer: Don Mitchell
- Status: Plans available

History
- First flight: 1980
- Developed from: Mitchell Wing B-10

The Mitchell U-2 Superwing is an American tailless ultralight aircraft that was designed by Don Mitchell for amateur construction.

== Design and development ==
Although the aircraft was designed before the US FAR 103 Ultralight Vehicles rules came into force, the U-2 Superwing complies with them anyway (including the category's maximum empty weight of 254 lb (115 kg)). The aircraft has a standard empty weight of 240 lb (109 kg). It features a cantilever mid-wing, a single-seat enclosed cockpit, tricycle landing gear and a single engine in pusher configuration. The U-2 is a development of the high-wing B-10.

The aircraft fuselage is made from welded steel tube, while the wing is of wood and foam, with doped aircraft fabric covering. Its 34 ft (10.4 m) span wing employs a modified Wortmann FX05-191 airfoil. The flight controls are unconventional; pitch and roll are controlled by elevons and yaw is controlled by the wing tip rudders. The main landing gear has suspension and the nose wheel is steerable and equipped with a brake.

The U-2 can accept a variety of engines ranging from 25 to 40 hp (19 to 30 kW) mounted in pusher configuration.

== Operational history ==
A pilot flying a U-2 set the World Record Altitude for Class C1 (single-engine land aircraft not exceeding 661 lb (299.8 kg) gross weight) in 1984 when he flew to 25,940 ft (7,906.5 m).

== Specifications (U-2) ==
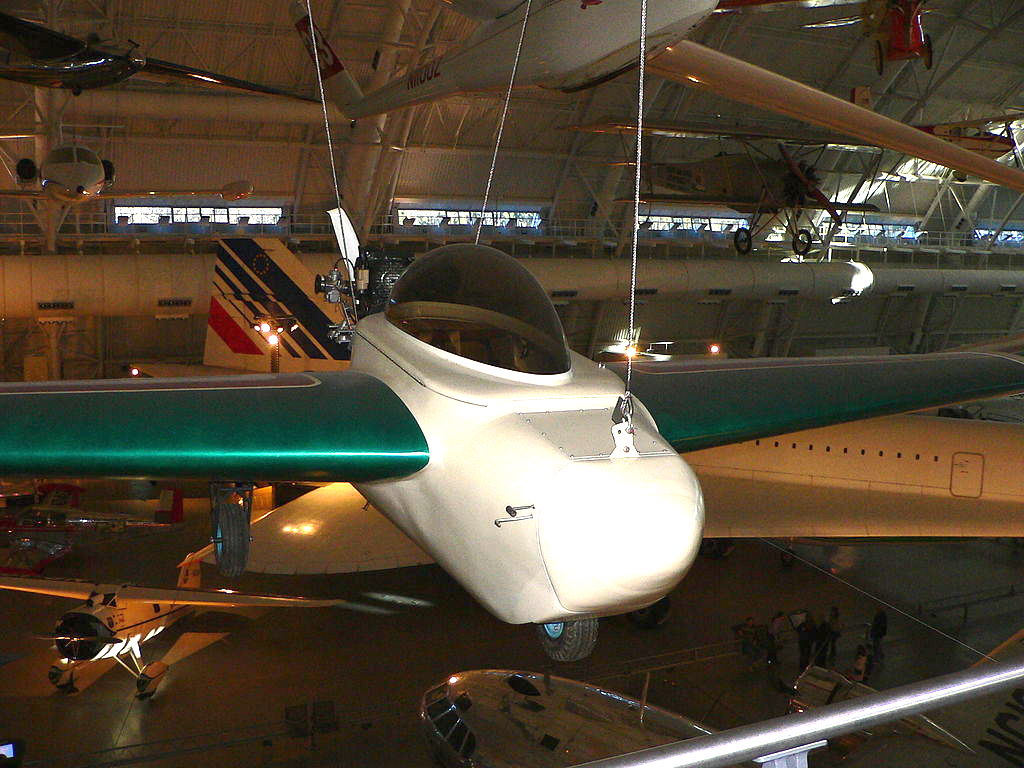
Mitchell U-2 Superwing

Data from Cliche

General characteristics

- Crew: one
- Wingspan: 34 ft (10 m)
- Wing area: 136 sq ft (12.6 m^{2})
- Empty weight: 240 lb (109 kg)
- Gross weight: 550 lb (249 kg)
- Fuel capacity: 3 U.S. gallons (11 L; 2.5 imp gal)
- Powerplant: 1 × Zenoah G25 , 20 hp (15 kW)

Performance

- Stall speed: 26 mph (42 km/h, 23 kn)
- Range: 180 mi (290 km, 160 nmi)
- Maximum glide ratio: 20:1 at 45 mph (72 km/h)
- Rate of climb: 400 ft/min (2.0 m/s)
- Wing loading: 4.04 lb/sq ft (19.7 kg/m^{2})

== See also ==
- Ultralight aviation
- Ultralight aircraft (United States)

Aircraft of comparable role, configuration, and era

- Aériane Swift
