= Spectrum Aircraft =

Canadian ultralight aircraft manufacturer

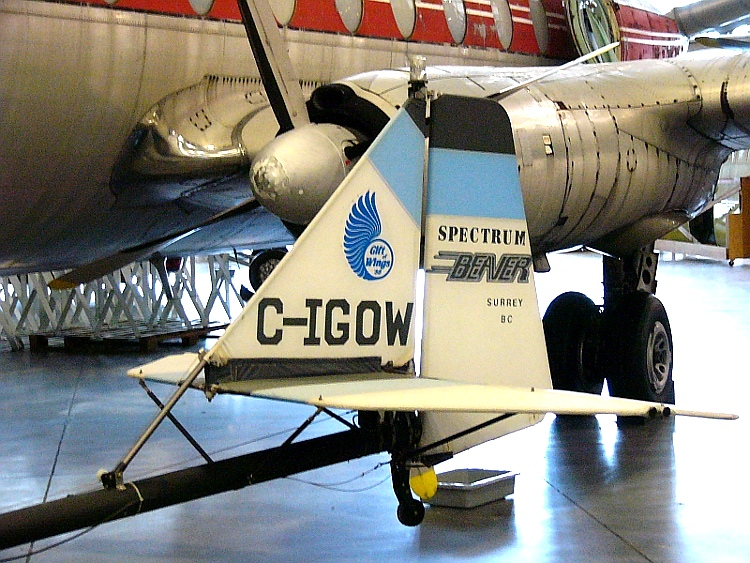
- Industry: Aerospace
- Founded: 1983
- Defunct: 1992
- Fate: Out of business
- Successor: Aircraft Sales and Parts (ASAP)
- Headquarters: Surrey, British Columbia, Canada
- Products: Spectrum Beaver

Spectrum Aircraft was a Canadian ultralight aircraft manufacturer that commenced operations in 1983 and went out of business in 1992. The company was known for its Beaver ultralight design, which remains in production by successor companies in the 21st century.

== History ==
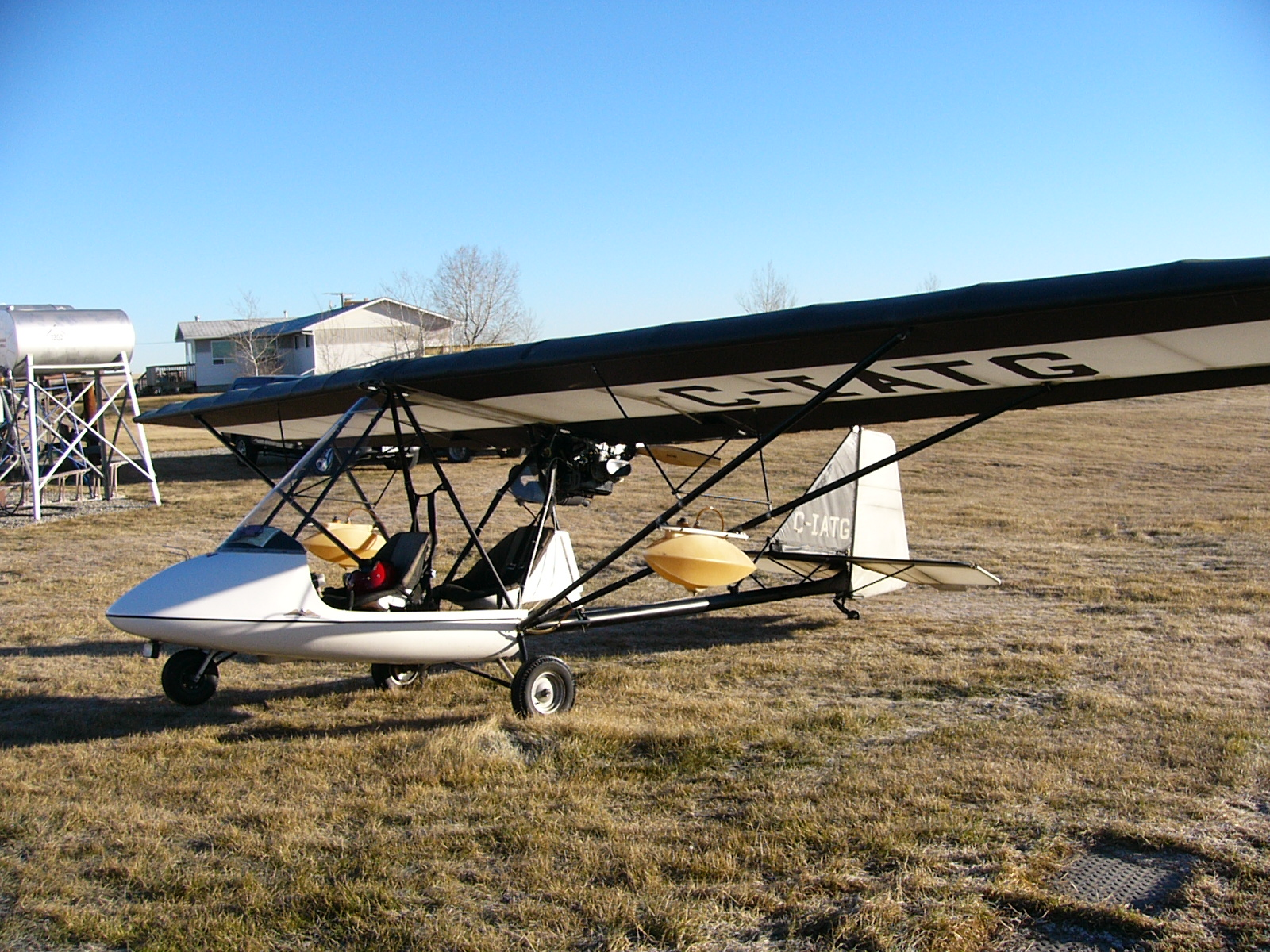
Spectrum Beaver RX 550

Sprectrum's first product was the RX-28 Beaver, a single-seat, high wing ultralight aircraft powered by a 28 hp (21 kW) Rotax 277 single cylinder, two stroke powerplant. It was introduced in 1983 and gained quick popularity in Canada and the USA. The following year the RX-28 was joined in production by the RX-35, which used the 35 hp (26 kW) Rotax 377 engine.

In 1986 the company started production of a two-seat version of the Beaver, designated the RX 550 and powered by a Rotax 503 50 hp (37 kW) engine. This model proved very popular as both a trainer and for private use and propelled the company into the forefront of ultralight aircraft production in North America.

In 1991 the company introduced the RX-650 Beaver, intending to market it in the then-newly introduced Canadian Advanced Ultra-light Aeroplane (AULA) category that allows passenger carrying. The aircraft proved to have structural issues that caused Transport Canada to remove it from the AULA list. The company went out of business in 1992, before rectifying the deficiencies in the RX-650's design.

== Successors ==
=== Beaver RX Enterprises ===
The RX-550 design was acquired by a new company, Beaver RX Enterprises, who returned the aircraft to production. The company did not last long and soon went out of business.

=== Aircraft Sales and Parts ===
In 1995 Aircraft Sales and Parts (ASAP) of Vernon, British Columbia purchased the RX-550 tooling and redesigned the aircraft. The new version was designated the RX 550 Plus and remains in production in kit form. By the end of 2007 a total of 2000 RX 550s had been produced by all manufacturers.

In 2000 ASAP introduced a single seat version of the Beaver based on the RX-28, designated the Beaver SS (Single Seat). Powered by a 40 hp (30 kW) Rotax 447 engine and with a wing derived from the RX 550 Plus design, this aircraft remains in kit production.

=== Freedom Lite & Legend Lite ===
In 1996 a new company, Freedom Lite, introduced a redesigned version of the Beaver RX 650. This improved RX 650 incorporated 186 changes over the previous version and was designated the SS-11 Skywatch and the company placed the aircraft in the Canadian AULA category. Freedom Lite soon went out of business and the design was acquired by Legend Lite of New Hamburg, Ontario. This new company also closed its doors in the early 2000s.

== Aircraft ==
Model name	First flight	Number built	Type
Beaver RX-28	1983		Single seat ultralight aircraft
Beaver RX-35	1984		Single seat ultralight aircraft
Beaver RX-550	1986		Two seat ultralight aircraft
Beaver RX-650	1991		Two seat ultralight aircraft
