= Cloudbuster Ultralights Cloudbuster =

American ultralight aircraft

Cloudbuster

General information
- Type: Ultralight aircraft
- National origin: United States
- Manufacturer: Cloudbuster Ultralights Company
- Status: Production completed

The Cloudbuster Ultralights Cloudbuster is an American ultralight aircraft that was designed and produced by the Cloudbuster Ultralights Company of Sarasota, Florida in the early 1980s. The aircraft was supplied as a kit for amateur construction.

== Design and development ==
The aircraft was designed to comply with the US FAR 103 Ultralight Vehicles rules, including the category's maximum empty weight of 254 lb (115 kg). The Cloudbuster has a standard empty weight of 248 lb (112 kg). It features a strut-braced high-wing, a single-seat, open cockpit, tricycle landing gear and a single engine in tractor configuration.

The aircraft fuselage structure is made from bolted-together aluminum tubing, with a tubular keel supporting the tail, wing mounts and the engine at the front. The standard factory supplied powerplant was the Zenoah G-25B of 20 hp (15 kW). Its 37 ft (11.3 m) span wing is braced with a single lift strut per side. The wing is of exotic mixed construction, with aluminum tubular spars, urethane foam and fibreglass wing ribs, the leading edge is vinyl-covered and the trailing edge is sheet aluminum and the whole wing finished in doped aircraft fabric covering. The pilot sits on an open seat that is not equipped with a windshield. The landing gear features main wheel suspension and a steerable nosewheel. The airframe was proof tested to +4.5/-2.25 g.

The complex wing does give the aircraft good gliding performance, achieving a 13:1 glide ratio and a minimum sink speed of 260 ft/min (1.3 m/s). However the complexity of the wing construction lead to the commercial failure of the aircraft design and few were produced.

== Specifications (Cloudbuster) ==
Data from Cliche

General characteristics

- Crew: one
- Wingspan: 37 ft (11 m)
- Wing area: 153 sq ft (14.2 m^{2})
- Aspect ratio: 8.9:1
- Empty weight: 248 lb (112 kg)
- Gross weight: 532 lb (241 kg)
- Fuel capacity: 3.5 U.S. gallons (13 L; 2.9 imp gal)
- Powerplant: 1 × Zenoah G-25B single cylinder, two-stroke aircraft engine with 2.5:1 belt drive reduction gearing, 20 hp (15 kW)

Performance

- Maximum speed: 60 mph (97 km/h, 52 kn)
- Cruise speed: 50 mph (80 km/h, 43 kn)
- Stall speed: 25 mph (40 km/h, 22 kn)
- Range: 135 mi (217 km, 117 nmi)
- Service ceiling: 10,000 ft (3,000 m)
- g limits: +4.5/-2.25
- Maximum glide ratio: 13:1
- Rate of climb: 650 ft/min (3.3 m/s)
- Rate of sink: 260 ft/min (1.3 m/s)
