= Zenoah G-25 =

- Type: Single cylinder two-stroke aircraft engine
- National origin: Japan
- Manufacturer: Zenoah

The Zenoah G-25 is a single cylinder, two stroke, carburetted aircraft engine, with optional fuel injection, designed for use on ultralight aircraft

== Development ==
The Zenoah G-25 is equipped with single capacitor discharge ignition and a single Mikuni slide-type carburetor. It is equipped with a recoil starter system or optionally electric start and a 2.5 or 2.8:1 belt reduction drive.

The engine runs on a mixture of unleaded auto fuel and oil.

Producing 22 hp (16 kW) at 6600 rpm, the G-25 competed in the early 1980s ultralight powerplant market against the similar Rotax 277. Production of the engine was completed in the late 1980s and today only used engines and parts are available.

== Applications ==
- Adventure F series
- Aerodyne Systems Vector
- AmeriPlanes Mitchell Wing A-10
- Beaujon Mach .07
- Carlson Sparrow
- Cascade Kasperwing I-80
- Cloudbuster Ultralights Cloudbuster
- Cosmos Samba
- DTA Alizés
- Fly Hard Trikes SkyCycle
- Greenwood Witch
- Hill Hummer
- ISON Airbike
- Jet Pocket Top Must
- La Mouette ZR 250
- LiteWing Aircraft LiteTrike
- Lookout Mountain SkyCycle
- Manta FX-3
- Mitchell Wing B-10
- Monnett Monerai P
- North Wing ATF
- Paramotor Inc FX series
- Personal Flight Sky-Bike
- Phoenix Industries B1Z ParaFlyer
- Phoenix Industries CV1 ParaFlyer
- Phoenix Industries TZ-1 ParaFlyer
- Pterodactyl Ascender
- Ritz Model A
- Rutan Solitaire
- St Croix Excelsior
- Striplin Lone Ranger
- Ultra-Efficient Products Penetrater

== Specifications (G-25B-1) ==
Data from Cliche & Tennessee Propellers

=== General characteristics ===
- Type: Single cylinder, two-stroke aircraft engine
- Bore: 72 mm (2.8 in)
- Stroke: 59.5 mm (2.3 in)
- Displacement: 242 cc (14.78 cu in)
- Length: 11.81 in (300.0 mm)
- Width: 11.57 in (293.9 mm)
- Height: 14.84 in (376.9 mm)
- Dry weight: 51 lb (23.1 kg)

=== Components ===
- Valvetrain: piston ported
- Fuel type: unleaded auto fuel
- Oil system: pre-mixed
- Cooling system: free air
- Reduction gear: 2.5 or 2.8:1 belt system

=== Performance ===
- Power output: 22 hp (16 kW) at 6600 rpm
- Compression ratio: 6.5:1
