= Walton, Ontario =

Walton
- Location within Ontario
- Coordinates: 43.67784°N 81.30168°W
- Country: Canada
- Province: Ontario

Walton (population: 96) is a Southwestern Ontario hamlet in Huron County, Ontario, Canada, located at the intersection of Huron County Road 12 and Road 25, 45 km east of Goderich.

== Geography ==
The geography of the region was shaped by the Wisconsin Glacial Episode. This was the last major advance of continental glaciers in the North American Laurentide Ice Sheet. According to the Atlas of Canada the moraine ridge to the east and north of Walton is remaining evidence and is the head of the South Maitland River.

It is probable the area was first occupied by Paleo-Indians almost as soon as the land was exposed by melting ice around 11,000 and 10,500 years ago, based on regional archaeological evidence. The Saugeen complex was a Native American culture of one of the first indigenous settlements of the region.

The general climate is determined by a combination of the prevailing westerly wind and proximity to the Great Lakes, referred to as lake effect. This is particularly evident during winter months as part of the snowbelt on the lee of Lake Huron

== History ==
Situated at the junction of Morris, Grey and McKillop Townships on the Seaforth-to-Wroxeter trail, Walton, is named for the English hometown of its founders John and Anna (Button) Hewitt. Hewitt was born in Walton in Buckinghamshire, England and married Anna Button there. They sailed for Upper Canada in 1843 after the Canada Company purchase, eventually settling in the Huron Tract They settled on Lot 1, Conc. 18 of Grey Twp. around 1859. The American Civil War (1861–1865) generated a widespread economic boom. In 1862, still governed under colonial rule, they named their new community Walton, just prior to Confederation (1867).

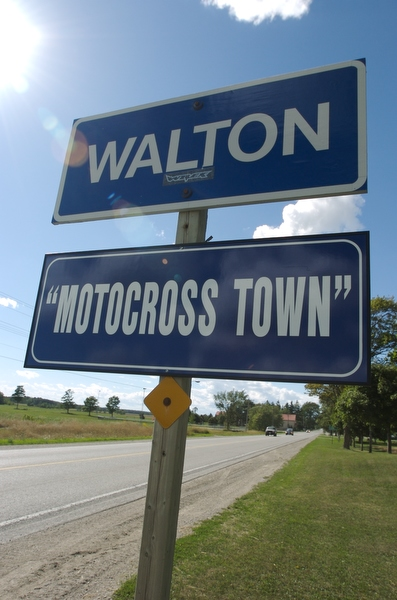
The annual TransCan motocross at Walton Raceway has established Walton as a national icon to motocross devotees

Soon there were two stores, a lodging house, a blacksmith shop and a sawmill and gristmill. There were the Rob Roy and Walton hotels and postal service began in 1862 in one of the general stores. Rural routes began in 1912 and eventually there were four. Biggar's Hotel sold many times over the years. In 1901, the adjoining house was destroyed by fire and two years later, an auction was held for the chattel of McKim's Royal Hotel and household goods. In 1919, the unused hotel was dismantled and the building materials used for area homes. The Walton Hotel was the most successful in the hamlet as it still functions as an inn and restaurant today. Charles Sage took ownership in 1868. Mrs. Sage continued to run the business until 1901.

Through the years there were pumpmakers, butchers, barbers, jewellers, lawyers, blacksmiths, carriage makers, harness makers, livery stable operators, doctors, veterinarians, bankers, implement dealers and garages. The Sovereign Bank operated until 1908 and the Standard Bank / Imperial Bank served customers from 1918 to 1933. Walton experienced a boom after 1907 when the Canadian Pacific Railway began running through the village. The railroad ceased to operations in 1988.

=== Community Hall ===
After serving as the Methodist Church, first at the corner of Huron County Road 12 (Brussels Line) and McKillop Twp. Conc. 14 (Canada Company Rd.), then moved to Lot 18, Conc. 1 of Grey Twp., the building was used as an Orange Hall from 1927 to 1938. When the Ancient Order of United Workmen’s hall was sold and converted to residential use, the community purchased the Orange Hall in 1938 for $50. When the hall was moved back across the highway to its present location, hydro lines were an obstacle. The roof and gables were dismantled for the move and the side walls lowered two feet before reconstruction. In 1945, four acres next to the hall were purchased for use as a ball diamond and picnic area. A recreation committee was set up in 1968. In 1976, the park was sold to the recreation committee for $1 and the Walton Area Sports Club was formed. Due to extensive repairs needed at that time, and the increasing difficult task of getting volunteer help, the building was sold to the Women's Institute. By 1955, there was fear the hall would have to be closed, sold or torn down. However, the community once again came to the rescue. A committee to oversee operations and fundraising formed and the hall was busier than it had been for many decades.

=== Schools ===
The first log schoolhouse was built in 1860 S.S. No. 11 – McGavin's School. Perhaps the S.S. No. 11, Walton School is now being used for one of the most unusual reasons of any of the other schoolhouses in Morris Township. McGavin's Farm Equipment now operates it business out of the brick building. The Walton Women's Institute's Tweedsmuir Collection provides some of the history of the Walton schoolhouses. According to it, a frame school was built on the southeast corner of Lot 30, Concession 9, Morris Township on land purchased by Robert Dennis on for $1. The frame school was built before 1873 with one room directly behind the red brick school, now owned by Neil McGavin. Later another school was built to the east of this frame school and joined to it by a hallway. Then later on one of these rooms was closed. In 1907, the red brick school was built to replace the two buildings. At one time this building held classes in both the classroom and the basement. Due to overcrowding in the brick school, another school was built in 1920, a few yards north of the brick school on the same property. This frame building was built for the junior classes. A house was built at the northeast corner. These buildings were covered with red asphalt shingles. This school was closed in 1932 and people returned to the red brick school It was used for storage by McGavin's until the mid 2000s. A new school was formed in 1961 which was known as Grey Township School Area No. 2. While the largest assessment was in Grey Township, it included 25 lots in McKillop Township belonging to the Walton School, Union No. 11, and also 14 McKillop lots belonging to Union School No. 12. It also included a portion of Morris Township. The move was the outcome of a vote in Morris Township which rejected the proposal to build a new school in Walton. A petition of interested Morris and Grey Township ratepayers asked for the formation of a new school area. this new four-room schoolhouse was opened officially on December 12, 1962 with the total cost of construction and equipment and other expenses amounting to about $84,000. At Lot 1, Conc. 18, Grey Twp., is the former Walton Public School, now Walton's Little School. A second one was built on Lot 30, Conc. 9, Morris Twp. in 1874. Large enrollment forced the construction of another building to the east. A red brick schoolhouse, S.S. No. 11, was built in 1907 next to where these buildings had stood. A second structure was joined in 1920. It was used until 1962 when Walton Public School was built. It was converted to a primary school in 1969. With decreased provincial funding for schools, the Avon Maitland District School Board closed the school in June 2000. McGavins moved into the red brick schoolhouse in 1962 and added a piece onto it in 1963.

=== Churches ===
Duff's United Church in Walton

Early residents could attend a Methodist, United Presbyterian or Presbyterian church service. St. George's Anglican Church drew parishioners from 1880 until 1968. The Methodist Church arrived and was used until 1925 when the congregation merged with the Presbyterians to form the United Church. The two Presbyterian congregations had joined in 1910. It then became known as Duff's United Church on the edge of the community at Lot 1, Conc. 17, Grey Twp.

Duff's United Church held its last service in September 2015 and has been sold for private use.

== Enterprise ==
Businesses include construction, a gravel pit, several farmer-related enterprises, a variety store, computer recycling, trucking, crafts, a repair shop, an aircraft and toy shop, mobile seed cleaning, engineering services, motocross racing and promotions, Walton Raceway.

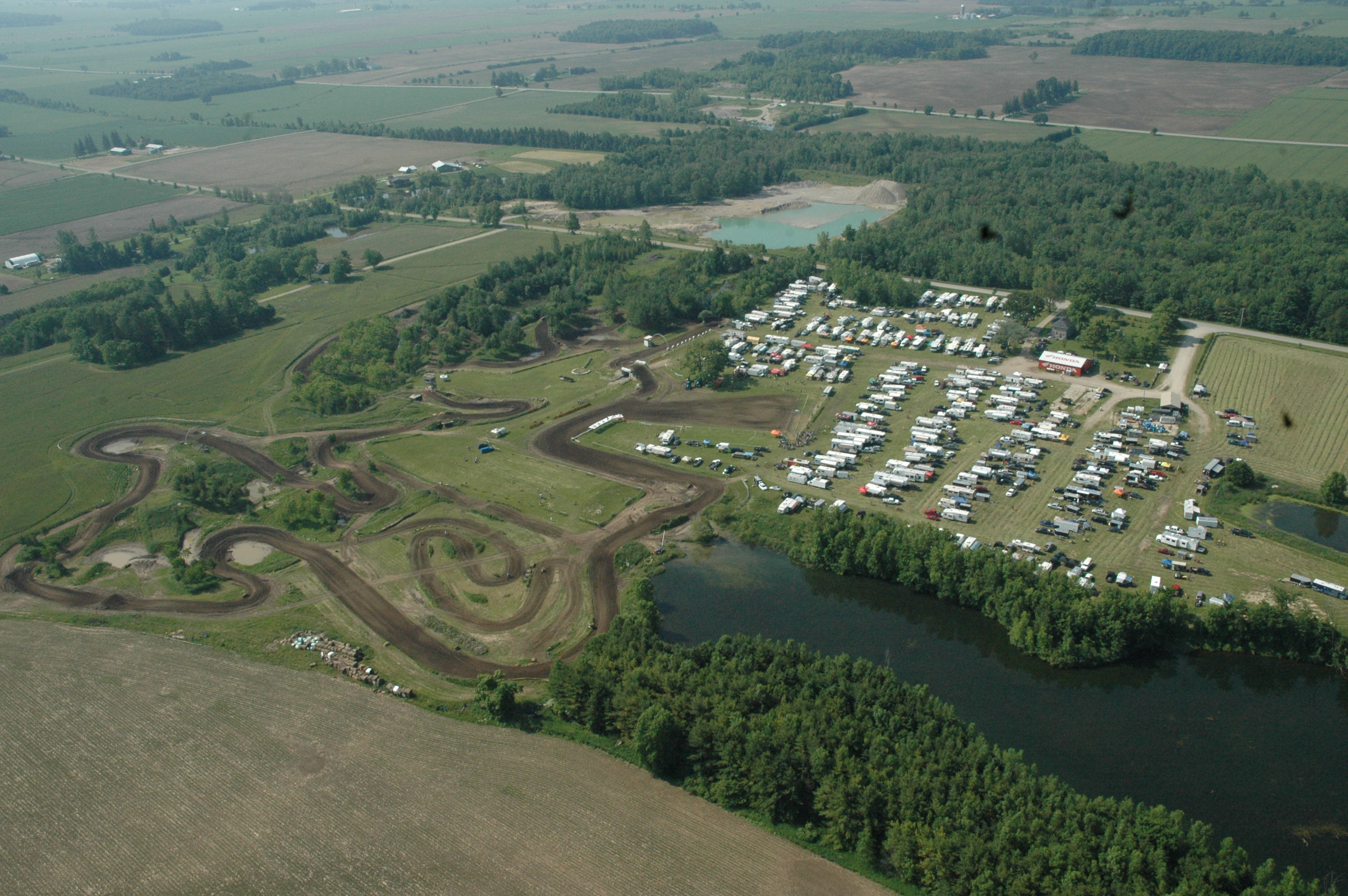
Walton Raceway's motocross track and one of several kettle ponds in the foreground. The Walker gravel pit and the Huron East Landfill are in the background to the south

== Media ==
- Huron Expositor
- The Citizen
- CKNX Radio
