= Bungee chair =

Type of office or lounge chair made with bungee cords

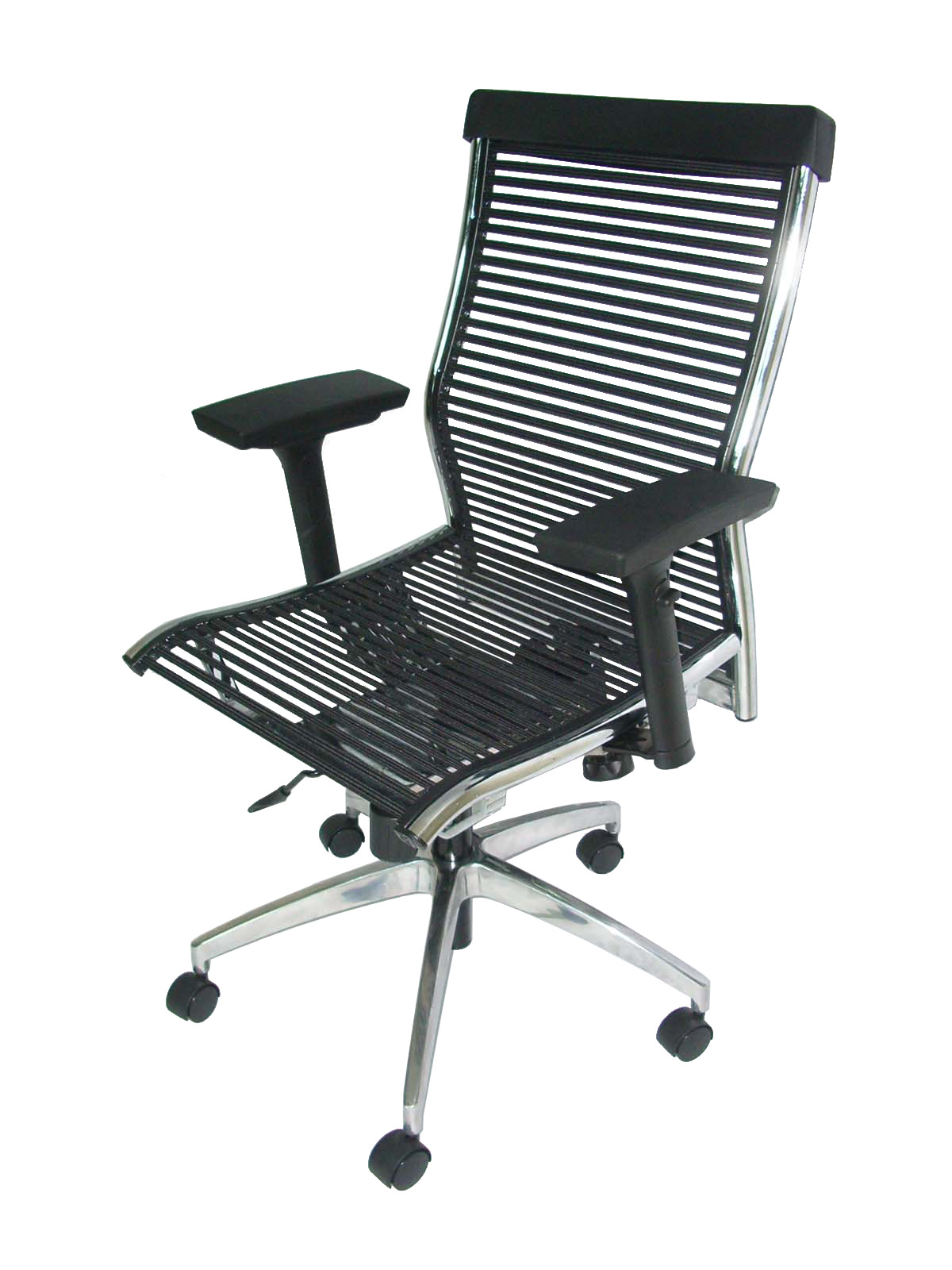
A bungee office chair

A bungee chair is a chair that has bungee cords or bands incorporated in its construction. While the chair’s legs and other components are usually made with traditional materials such as plastic or metal, the seating and back portions of the chair are made with bungee.

== Features ==
Bungee chairs are noted for their distinctive style and form. The open spaces between each bungee band tend to give the chair a unique sense of breathability and "bounce". The chair's bungee bands can be either rounded or flattened, and the number of bands on each make of bungee chair may vary.

== Types ==
Types of bungee chairs include office chairs, lounge chairs and folding chairs. A relatively obscure form of chair a decade ago, the bungee chair is now common in many retail locations.

== See also ==
- Acapulco Chair
