= Rotec Panther =

American ultralight aircraft

Panther

General information
- Type: Ultralight aircraft
- National origin: United States
- Manufacturer: Rotec Engineering
- Status: Production completed

History
- Introduction date: 1984

The Rotec Panther is an American ultralight aircraft that was designed and produced by Rotec Engineering, introduced in 1984. The aircraft was supplied as a kit for amateur construction.

== Design and development ==
The aircraft was originally designed as a homebuilt aircraft, but was later lightened and adapted to comply with the US FAR 103 Ultralight Vehicles rules, including the category's maximum empty weight of 254 lb (115 kg). In its ultralight version the aircraft has a standard empty weight of 250 lb (113 kg) when equipped with a lightweight engine and an abbreviated cockpit fairing. It features a strut-braced high-wing, a single-seat, enclosed cockpit, conventional landing gear and a single engine in pusher configuration.

The aircraft is made from aluminum tubing, with the flying surfaces covered in Dacron sailcloth. The cockpit fairing is made from fiberglass. Its 34 ft (10.4 m) span wing is supported by "V" lift struts and jury struts and features elliptical winglets. The controls are conventional and feature full-span ailerons. The landing gear has bungee suspension and optional main wheel fairings.

== Variants ==
Homebuilt version
Panther with full cockpit fairing and an empty weight that exceeds the maximum for the US ultralight category.
Ultralight version
Panther with small cockpit pod and low sides to save weight. When equipped with the Rotax 277 single cylinder, two-stroke engine of 28 hp (21 kW) can qualify for the US ultralight category.
Two seat version
Panther with a second seat in tandem.

== Specifications (Panther ultralight) ==
Data from Cliche

General characteristics

- Crew: one
- Wingspan: 34 ft (10 m)
- Empty weight: 250 lb (113 kg)
- Gross weight: 475 lb (215 kg)
- Fuel capacity: 3.5 U.S. gallons (13 L; 2.9 imp gal)
- Powerplant: 1 × Rotax 277 single cylinder, two-stroke aircraft engine, 28 hp (21 kW)

Performance

- Maximum speed: 60 mph (97 km/h, 52 kn)
- Cruise speed: 58 mph (93 km/h, 50 kn)
- Stall speed: 22 mph (35 km/h, 19 kn)
- Range: 172 mi (277 km, 149 nmi)
- Service ceiling: 10,000 ft (3,000 m)
- g limits: +4/-2
- Maximum glide ratio: 9:1
- Rate of climb: 400 ft/min (2.0 m/s)

== See also ==
Aircraft of comparable role, configuration, and era

- Birdman Chinook
