= Cordillera Mountains =

Cordillera Mountains may refer to:

- American Cordillera, North and South America
- Arctic Cordillera, northeastern Canada
- Andes in South-America (Cordillera Oriental, Cordillera Occidental, and Chile's Cordillera de la Costa)
- Cordillera Central (Luzon) in the Philippines
