= Robertson B1-RD =

American ultralight aircraft

B1-RD
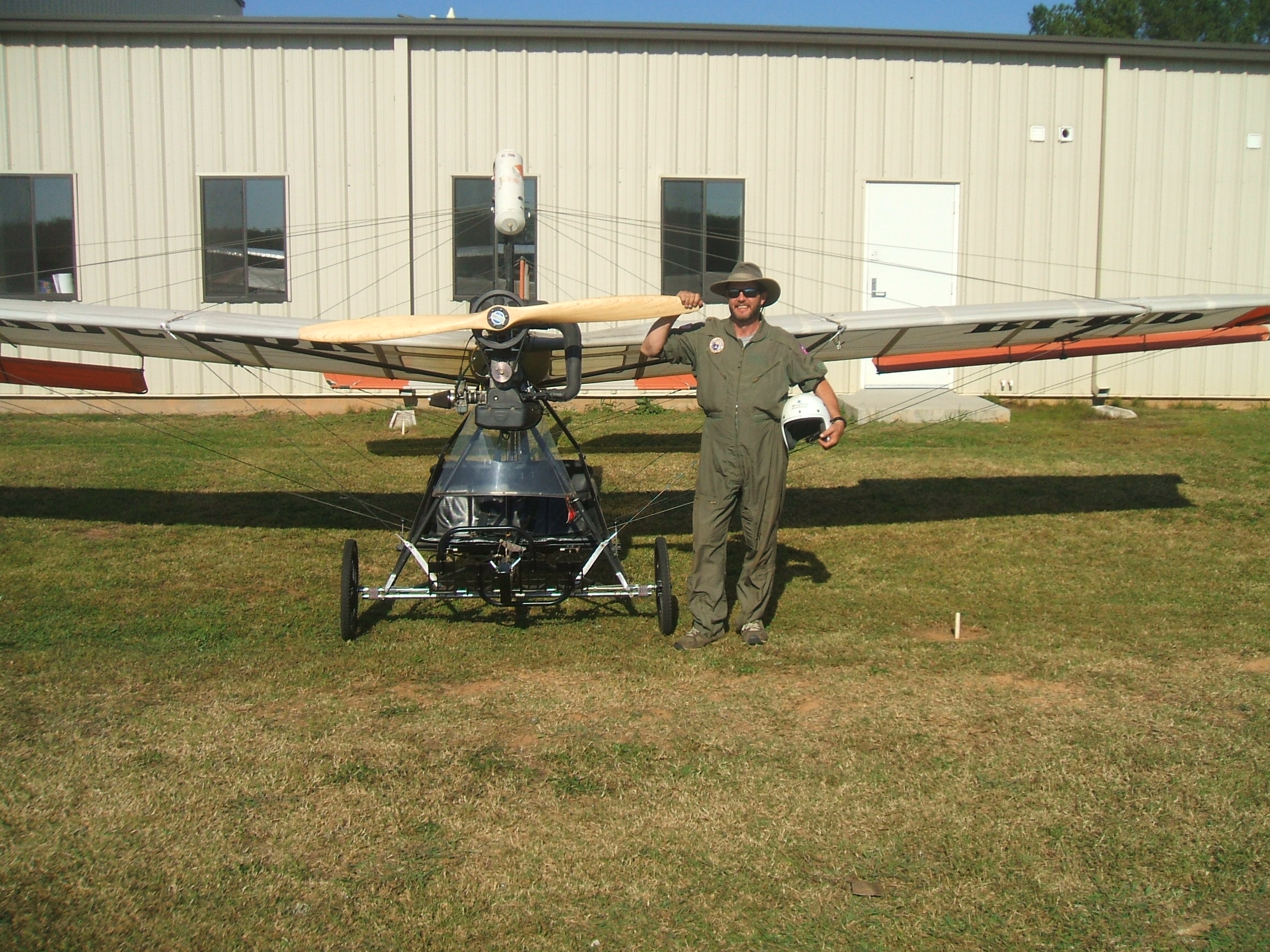

General information
- Type: Ultralight aircraft
- National origin: United States
- Manufacturer: Robertson Aircraft Corporation
- Designer: Glen Bashforth and Bruce Bashforth
- Status: Production completed

History
- Manufactured: June 1982-1984
- Introduction date: June 1982

The Robertson B1-RD is an American ultralight aircraft that was designed by Glen Bashforth and Bruce Bashforth and produced by the Robertson Aircraft Corporation. The aircraft was supplied as a kit for amateur construction with production starting in June 1982.

== Design and development ==
The aircraft was designed to comply with the US FAR 103 Ultralight Vehicles rules, including the category's maximum empty weight of 254 lb (115 kg). The B1-RD has a standard empty weight of 220 lb (100 kg). It has a cable-braced high-wing, single-seat, open cockpit, single engine in tractor engine configuration, and is equipped with conventional landing gear.

The aircraft is made from bolted together aluminum tubing with the wings and tail surfaces covered in Dacron sailcloth. Its 32 ft (9.8 m) span wing is cable-braced to a top surface inverted "V" kingpost. The wing is a single-surface airfoil with a double-surface wing covering optional. The controls are conventional three-axis, including Junkers-style flaperons. The main fuselage structure is an aluminum keel tube that runs from the tail, mounts the wings and then the engine at the front. The original standard engines were the 30 hp (22 kW) Cuyuna 430R and the 20 hp (15 kW) Cuyuna 215. The landing gear has bungee-suspension on all three wheels and the tailwheel is steerable.

Production of the B1-RD was curtailed circa 1984 due to liability concerns.

== Variants ==
In addition to the standard single-seat model, a two-seat version of the B1-RD was also marketed.

== Specifications (B1-RD) ==
Data from Cliche

General characteristics

- Crew: one
- Wingspan: 32 ft 0 in (9.75 m)
- Wing area: 162 sq ft (15.1 m^{2})
- Empty weight: 220 lb (100 kg)
- Gross weight: 500 lb (227 kg)
- Fuel capacity: 4 U.S. gallons (15 L; 3.3 imp gal)
- Powerplant: 1 × Cuyuna 430R two-cylinder, two-stroke aircraft engine, 30 hp (22 kW)

Performance

- Maximum speed: 50 mph (80 km/h, 43 kn)
- Cruise speed: 38 mph (61 km/h, 33 kn)
- Stall speed: 15 mph (24 km/h, 13 kn)
- Never exceed speed: 75 mph (121 km/h, 65 kn)
- Range: 125 mi (201 km, 109 nmi)
- Service ceiling: 14,000 ft (4,300 m)
- g limits: +3/-2
- Maximum glide ratio: 8.5:1
- Rate of climb: 850 ft/min (4.3 m/s)
- Rate of sink: 300 ft/min (1.5 m/s)
