= Airmass Sunburst =

American ultralight aircraft

Sunburst

General information
- Type: Ultralight aircraft
- National origin: United States
- Manufacturer: Airmass, Inc.; Personal Planes, Inc.; Double Star Engineering & Manufacturing, Inc.; Sterner Ultracraft.
- Designer: John Massey
- Status: Production completed

The Airmass Sunburst is an American ultralight aircraft that was designed by John Massey and produced in the early 1980s by Airmass, Inc. of Stillwell, Kansas, Personal Planes, Inc. of Norwalk, Ohio, Double Star Engineering & Manufacturing, Inc. of Texas and Sterner Ultracraft based in Sterling Heights, Michigan. The aircraft was supplied as a kit for amateur construction.

== Design and development ==
The aircraft was designed to comply with the US FAR 103 Ultralight Vehicles rules, including the category's maximum empty weight of 254 lb (115 kg). The aircraft has a standard empty weight of 253 lb (115 kg). It features a cable-braced high-wing, an inverted V-tail, a single-seat, open cockpit, tricycle landing gear and a single engine in pusher configuration.

The airframe is made from bolted-together aluminum tubing (mostly anodized). (On the Sunburst C, the wing spars and mixer assembly use 6061-TS stock, not anodized, with thicknesses of 0.058-inch and 0.049-inch.) Its 36 ft (11.0 m) span wing is supported by cables (on the Sunburst C: 3/32-inch and 1/8-inch plastic-coated, stainless steel cable) attached to an inverted "V" kingpost. (The Sunburst C's upper flying wires are not plastic-coated.) Sunbrust C fasteners are AN-aircraft grade standard hardware, with assorted plastic caps, plugs, saddles, and spacers.

Wing and tail of the Sunburst C were originally surfaced with 3.9-ounce stabilized Dacron fabric. The control system is three-axis, with roll controlled by spoilers, using a side stick and pitch and yaw controlled by ruddervators. The pilot is accommodated on an open (fiberglas bucket) seat, without a windshield.

The landing gear features a steerable nose wheel and suspension on all three wheels (two large, one small, fiber-spoked wheels). The aircraft originally came without brakes, and was configured to allow the pilot to use his feet to hold the aircraft stationary on the ground under the engine's static thrust.

The 2-cycle Cuyuna 430 engine of 30 hp (22 kW) - with recoil starter, forced-air cooling, and dual capacitive-discharge ignition - is mounted under the wing. It drives the pusher propeller through an extension shaft. The Sunburst C was supplied with a 54"x27" laminated, 2-ply birch-wood propeller.

A study by the University of Kansas, for NASA, found a Sunburst's Cuyuna UL-430RR engine to have thrust ranging from 10 pounds at ground idle to 208 pounds maximum in flight. In static testing, the report said: "...fuel consumption ranged from about 1.0 Ibs/Hr at idle to 18 Ibs/Hr at 2600 RPM and, from there, increased to 35 Ibs/Hr at 2810 RPM."

Construction time from the factory-supplied assembly kit was estimated at 30 hours. The aircraft can be disassembled and stored in a bag suitable for car-top ground transportation.

== Operational history ==
A number of Sunbursts suffered structural failures that resulted in fatal accidents (reportedly involving cable breakages killing four pilots). The cause was traced to cable attachment brackets that were made with rough holes that over time in service sawed through the cable thimbles and caused the flight cables to break. This was addressed by replacing the brackets.

In service, the propeller extension shaft suffered from vibration issues that caused failures of the engine output shaft. This was addressed by the use of a vibration dampening shaft coupler made from rubber.

In 1982, designer Massey piloted one of his Sunburst ultralights across the English Channel, as part of the 1982 London-Paris ultralight race.

Starting in January, 1983, the University of Kansas, sponsored by NASA, initiated several different analytic studies of various aspects of an Airmass Sunburst Model 'C', with the reports published by NASA in the public domain.

== Production history ==
=== Airmass ===
The Sunburst and two-seat Sunburst II were designed by John Massey, and originally produced by Airmass, Inc. in the Kansas City suburb of Stillwell, Kansas. Following a series of fatal crashes, the craft was modified. A Sunburst Model 'C' was also produced by Airmass, and studied extensively in 1983 by the University of Kansas for NASA.

=== Personal Planes, Inc. ===
The design was acquired by Personal Planes, Inc. (owned by James Bender and Robert Blackman), the operator of the Norwalk-Huron County Airport in Norwalk, Ohio. The design was marketed as the Sunburst V. In April, 1983, the company's chief pilot, Robert Burger, was killed in the crash of his ultralight, and by July, 1983, the company had announced plans to dissolve the business.

=== Double Star Engineering & Manufacturing, Inc. ===
In the autumn of 1983, the design was acquired by Double Star Engineering & Manufacturing, Inc., of Texas, and marketed as the Lone Star (single-seat) and Double Star (two-seat).

=== Sterner Ultracraft ===
In the spring of 1984, Double Star merged with Sterner Ultracraft, of Sterling Heights, Michigan (owner: Bob Sterner), who resumed production of the two Double Star company models, and a third, the Star Fire (along with Sterner's own unrelated Sky Walker design). By early 1985, Sterner Ultracraft had ceased operation.

== Variants ==
- Sunburst (original aircraft, as described above)
- Sunburst C (referenced as test subject in series of NASA-sponsored research tests by University of Kansas)
- Sunburst II (two-seater)
- Sunburst V (improved model, with early post-fatality fixes, as produced by Personal Planes, Inc.)
- Lone Star (version produced by Double Star Manufacturing & Engineering, Inc., and Sterner Ultracraft)
- Double Star (two-seat version produced by Double Star Manufacturing & Engineering, Inc., and Sterner Ultracraft)

== Specifications (Sunburst) ==
Data from Cliche and the Virtual Ultralight Museum

General characteristics

- Crew: one
- Length: 16 ft (4.9 m)
- Wingspan: 36 ft (11 m)
- Height: 9 ft (2.7 m)
- Wing area: 159 sq ft (14.8 m^{2})
- Empty weight: 253 lb (115 kg)
- Gross weight: 525 lb (238 kg)
- Fuel capacity: 5 U.S. gallons (19 L; 4.2 imp gal)
- Powerplant: 1 × Cuyuna 430 two cylinder, two-stroke aircraft engine, 30 hp (22 kW)

Performance

- Cruise speed: 35 mph (56 km/h, 30 kn)
- Stall speed: 25 mph (40 km/h, 22 kn)
- Range: 100 mi (160 km, 87 nmi)
- Maximum glide ratio: 10:1 at 40 mph (64 km/h)
- Rate of climb: 800 ft/min (4.1 m/s)
- Wing loading: 3.30 lb/sq ft (16.1 kg/m^{2})
