= Bofinger chair =

Chair designed by Helmut Bätzner in 1964

- Designer: Helmut Bätzner
- Date: 1964/66
- Materials: Fiberglass-reinforced polyester resin
- Style / tradition: Modern classic
- Sold by: Bofinger (Germany)
- Height: 75 cm (30 in); Seat height: 44 cm (17 in)
- Width: 53 centimetres (21 in)

The Bofinger Chair, also named BA 1171, was designed by architect and designer Helmut Bätzner in 1964.

== Background ==
In close co-operation with Bofinger company, situated in Ilsfeld in Baden-Württemberg/Germany, under the owner and managing director Rudolf Baresel-Bofinger, the Bofinger stacking chair was developed into the first one-piece plastic chair worldwide in fibreglass- reinforced polyester to be mass-produced in one single pressing process over a steel mould. The material was dyed all the way through before being processed and available in a range of colours, including white, yellow, black, red, blue, green, brown, and orange.

In a long trial series, the characteristic shape of the chair was found in regard to seating shape, maximum stability by the smallest quantity of material used, required elasticity, stacking capability, and industrial mass-production. The pressing process in the heated steel mould, with a weight of approximately 11 tons, lasted under five minutes and was required as a finishing treatment, with only simple scraping around the edges to remove excess polyester.

== Recognition ==
In 1966, the Bofinger Chair made its debut at the Cologne furniture fair. The same year it received the 'Rosenthal-Studio' Award in the presence of Chancellor Ludwig Erhard, Philipp Rosenthal and Walter Gropius. The Bofinger Chair became a design icon of its time. In 1971, on the occasion of an art happening in Berlin, twelve well-known artists - among those Joseph Beuys, Sigmar Polke, Günther Uecker, Wolf Vostell, and Stefan Wewerka – transformed the Bofinger stacking chair into an art object.

Museums, such as the Victoria & Albert Museum in London, the Centre Pompidou in Paris, and the Vitra Design Museum in Weil am Rhein, included the Bofinger Chair in their collection. The Bofinger Chair is regarded as one of the most significant classics in the history of modern furniture design.

== See also ==
- Acapulco Chair
