= P38 =

P38 or P-38 may refer to:

== Biology and medicine ==
- Multisynthetase complex auxiliary component p38
- p38 mitogen-activated protein kinases
- RPP38, ribonuclease P protein subunit p38

== Military ==
- HMS P38 (1917), a P-class sloop of the Royal Navy
- HMS P38 (1941), a submarine of the Royal Navy
- Lockheed P-38 Lightning, an American fighter aircraft
- P-38 can opener, issued by the United States Armed Forces
- Walther P38, a pistol

== Other uses ==
- Mitchell Wing P-38, an American ultralight aircraft
- Papyrus 38, a biblical manuscript
- Phosphorus-38, an isotope of phosphorus
- Range Rover (P38A), a SUV
- Porax-38, a starfighter from the Star Wars fictional universe
