= Chandelle Mk IV =

American ultralight aircraft

Mark IV

General information
- Type: Ultralight aircraft
- National origin: United States
- Manufacturer: Chandelle Aircraft
- Designer: Nile Downer
- Status: Production completed

History
- Introduction date: 1984

The Chandelle Mk IV is an American ultralight aircraft that was designed by Nile Downer and produced by Chandelle Aircraft. The aircraft was supplied as a kit for amateur construction.

== Design and development ==
The aircraft was designed to comply with the US FAR 103 Ultralight Vehicles rules, including the category's maximum empty weight of 254 lb (115 kg). The aircraft has a standard empty weight of 243 lb (110 kg). It features a strut-braced high-wing, a single-seat, open cockpit, tricycle landing gear and a single engine in pusher configuration.

The aircraft is made from bolted-together aluminum tubing, with the wings and tail surfaces covered in Dacron sailcloth. Its tapered planform, single-surface, 30.5 ft (9.3 m) span wing is supported by both lift struts and jury struts. The wing features 3/4 span ailerons. The pilot is accommodated in an open seat without a windshield. The tail surfaces are mounted on tubes that travel beside and below the pusher engine and propeller. The tricycle landing gear features main gear suspension.

The Mark IV appeared just before the collapse of the US ultralight market in 1984 and so few were produced or sold.

== Specifications (Mk IV) ==
Data from Cliche

General characteristics

- Crew: one
- Length: 17 ft (5.2 m)
- Wingspan: 30 ft 6 in (9.30 m)
- Height: 8 ft 7 in (2.62 m)
- Wing area: 153 sq ft (14.2 m^{2})
- Empty weight: 243 lb (110 kg)
- Gross weight: 500 lb (227 kg)
- Fuel capacity: 5 U.S. gallons (19 L; 4.2 imp gal)
- Powerplant: 1 × Cuyuna UL II-02 twin cylinder, two-stroke engine, 30 hp (22 kW)
- Propellers: 2-bladed wooden

Performance

- Maximum speed: 59 mph (95 km/h, 51 kn)
- Cruise speed: 45 mph (72 km/h, 39 kn)
- Stall speed: 23 mph (37 km/h, 20 kn)
- Never exceed speed: 75 mph (121 km/h, 65 kn)
- Rate of climb: 700 ft/min (3.6 m/s)
