= Pterodactyl Ascender =

American ultralight aircraft

Pterodactyl series
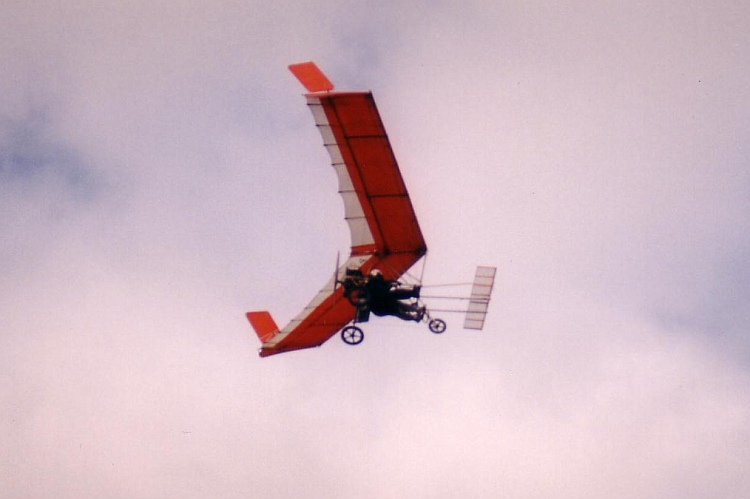
- Pterodactyl Ascender II+2

General information
- Type: ultralight personal, trainer aircraft
- National origin: USA
- Manufacturer: Pterodactyl Limited
- Designer: Jack McCornack
- Number built: 1396

History
- Manufactured: 1979–1984
- Introduction date: 1979
- First flight: 1977
- Developed from: Manta Fledge IIB hang glider

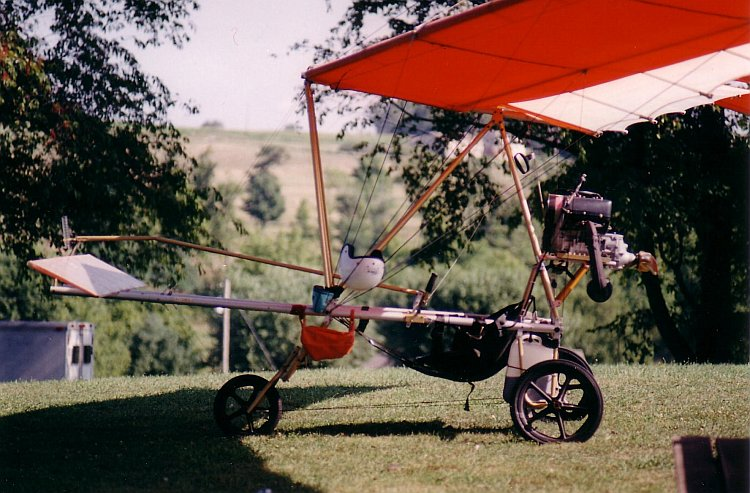
An Ascender II+2 two seater. The powerplant is a Rotax 503 50 hp (37 kW) two stroke.

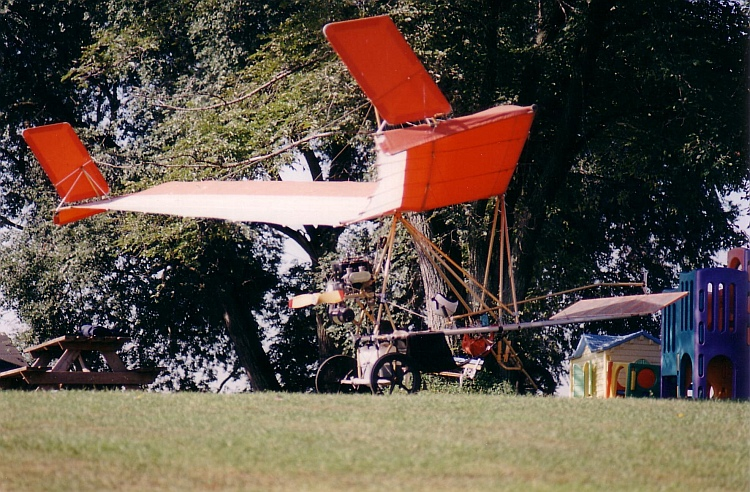
Pterodactyl Ascender II+2

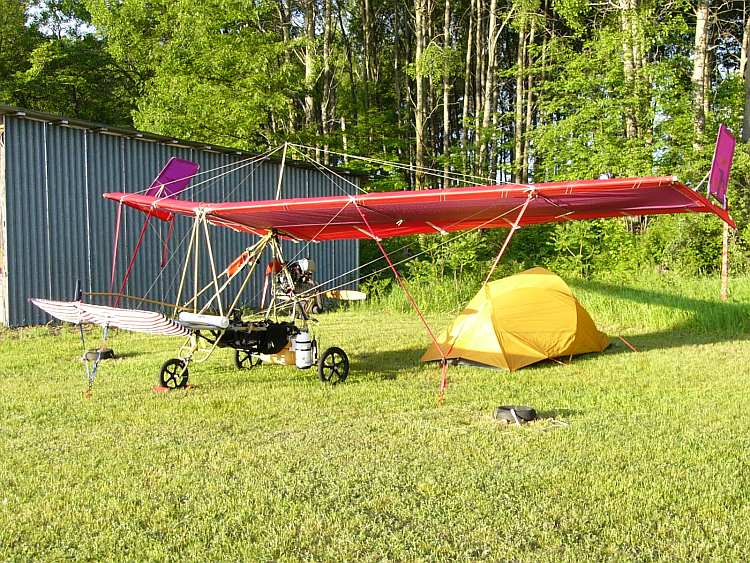
Fly camping with a DFE Ascender III-C two seater.

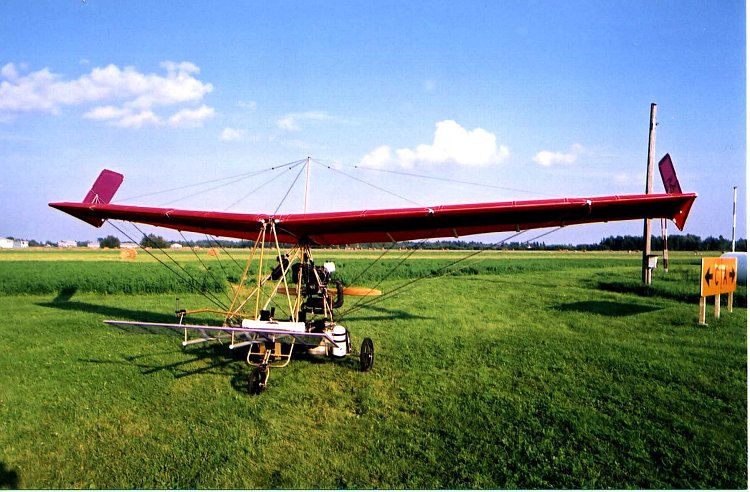
Newly completed DFE Ascender III-C prior to first flight, 2004

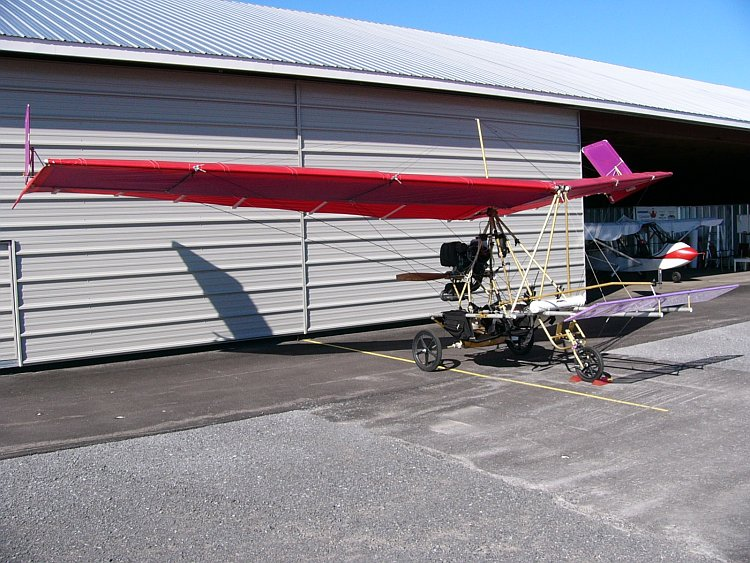
DFE Ascender III-C in front of its hangar. The aircraft in the background is a Quad City Challenger II.

The Pterodactyl Ascender is a family of U.S. designed and built ultralight aircraft that were sold in kit form between 1979 and 1984 under Pterodactyl Limited and is currently being sold by DFE Ultralights.

With a total production of 1,396 aircraft between 1979 and 1984 plus limited production today as the DFE Ascender III series, the aircraft has been one of the most influential designs in ultralight aviation.

== Design and development ==
The Pterodactyl designs have their roots in the Manta Fledge hang gliders of the 1970s. The Fledge was designed by Klaus Hill and produced by Manta Products in a series that ran from the Fledge I to the IV, with numerous sub models designated by letters. The Fledge series were of a "rigid-wing" type, as opposed to the predominantly "flex-wing" hang glider designs then common. These designs all featured weight-shift pitch control and tip-rudders for yaw and roll control. The tip rudders were controlled by control-bar sliders which deployed one tip rudder at a time to create a yaw. The glider's swept wing then translated the yaw into a matched rolling motion. The Fledge series were considered to be high performance hang gliders during their production run in the 1970s.

California inventor Jack McCornack took the Fledge IIB wing and designed a tubular assembly that replaced the Fledge's hang glider seat with a reclined pilot seat, wheeled landing gear and engine mount for a pusher powerplant. The aircraft used a mouth-controlled throttle, as both hands were used on the tip rudder twist grips which were retained from the Fledge. The aircraft was tailless. Power was supplied by a two-stroke Xenoah engine of 16 horsepower driving a 36-inch propeller. This new design, named the Pterodactyl Fledgling, was first flown in 1977. It is also referred to variously as the Pterodactyl Fledge and Pfledge.

The aircraft was first publicly displayed at an ultralight fly-in at Gilroy, California in 1978. McCornack formed Pterodactyl Limited to produce an improved version of the design, designated the Fledge X powered by the Xenoah 242 16 hp (12 kW) engine.

In 1979 McCornack and his flying partner, Keith Nicely, flew two improved Fledglings from their base in Monterey, California, to Oshkosh, Wisconsin, where they made a positive impression on the large gathering of pilots at the EAA annual convention there. At the convention they were invited by Mother Earth News magazine to fly the aircraft on to the Atlantic coast on pure ethanol supplied by the magazine. The flight from coast to coast was one of the longest trips of the period and garnered much attention for the start-up company.

Limited production of the version flown to Oshkosh started in the fall of 1979. The model was called the Pterodactyl Pfledge OR (Oshkosh Replica) and was powered by a Sachs SA-340 336 cc direct drive two-stroke engine.

Construction of all Pterodactyl aircraft was predominantly of anodized 6061-T6 aluminum tubing, braced with swaged steel cables supported by a king post and with a sewn Dacron sail for wing covering. Fittings to join the tubing were either extruded or made from sheet and bolted together.

The company was moved in 1980 from Monterey to a new 7,200-square-foot (670 m^{2}) facility co-located with the Seventh-day Adventist Monterey Bay Academy at Watsonville, California, and series production of the Pfledge was commenced. The new location was ideal as it included access to the Monterey Bay Academy Airport. The design went through a series of evolutionary improvements, mostly involving the powerplants installed and these resulted in a number of different models.

Pterodactyl production commenced in 1979 and was completed in 1984, when the company was sold to a group of partners under the name "Freedom Fliers" and moved to Rowlett, Texas. The company quickly went out of business, and few aircraft were completed. McCornack was never paid for the sale of the company. A total of 1,396 aircraft were built by Pterodactyl.

=== DFE Ultralights ===
In 1991 one of McCornack's original dealers from 1978, Dave Froble, started producing parts to keep his own fleet of Pterodactyls flying. He located and purchased the old stock of Manta Products airframe parts and produced CAD drawings for the complete parts.

In 1992 Froble started making parts available and later offered kits for complete aircraft in three models under the company name DFE Ultralights (Dave Froble Enterprises). These were very similar to the original Pfledge and Ascender series and were named Ascender III, with letters to designate the various models.

DFE Ultralights has produced a small number of complete kits and offers spare parts to support the fleet of existing aircraft with parts to keep them flying.

== Operational history ==
In the USA the single seat Pterodactyl models are flown as ultralights under FAR 103, whereas the two seat models are usually registered as experimental amateur-builts.

In Canada all Pterodactyls are classified as Basic Ultra-lights.

Pterodactyls have been flown on many long flights. John D. (Jack) Peterson, Jr. completed a flight in a Pfledge from Long Beach, California to Hilton Head, South Carolina over a period of 29 days between July 9 and August 6, 1979, with ground support. He flew the 3,200-mile (5,100 km) distance by flying distances of a maximum of 120 miles (194 km) in a single flight. This feat was the first time that an ultralight airplane had been flown across the US from coast to coast. Peterson's aircraft is on display in the Smithsonian Museum's Steven F. Udvar-Hazy Center.

McCornack and Nicely's 1979 flight from Monterey, California, to Oshkosh, Wisconsin, and on to the Atlantic coast was the second transcontinental flight by this aircraft type and was done mostly without ground support.

== Variants ==
Pfledge
The first Pfledges (also referred to as Fledges, and Fledglings) were tailless flying wings powered by a two-stroke Xenoah engine driving a 36-inch propeller. Some were also powered by a 10 hp (7 kW) 136 cc Chrysler two stroke engine.

Pfledge X
The Pfledge X featured a Xenoah 242 powerplant that produced 16 hp (12 kW).

Pfledge OR
The "Oshkosh Replica" was the production version of the two aircraft that were flown coast to coast in 1979. It was powered by a German Sachs SA-340 direct drive engine with a 336 cc displacement. This model sold for USD2,850 in 1980.

Pfledge 430D
The Pfledge 430D was announced late in 1979. This model featured a Cuyuna 430D engine which McCornack helped design. The engine was a two cylinder, two stroke engine with a displacement of 429 cc and a power output of 30 hp (22 kW). It weighed 64 lb (29 kg). The "D" indicated that the engine was direct drive and not connected to the propeller through a reduction drive system.

The Pfledge 430D also replaced the twist grips with a conventional stick for roll control, originally developed by Paul Yarnell, while pitch remained via weight shift.

The Pfledge 430D cost USD3600 in 1980.

NFL
Before the introduction of its FAR 103 ultralight regulations in 1982 the FAA did not regulate ultralights as long as they were foot-launchable.

The demand from conventional aircraft pilots for a version of the Pfledge that had aerodynamic pitch control instead of weight-shift led McCornack to add an elevator to the back of the aircraft, mounted on twin booms behind the pusher propeller. Because this design was "Not Foot Launchable" it was called the NFL (pronounced "Niffle"). The design was not a production success and few were built, but the NFL paved the way for the Ptraveler and Ascender to follow.

Ptraveler
McCornack had first installed a canard elevator on a Pfledge in 1978, but did not create a production model until 1980. The canard was operated by a side-mounted control stick. Foreward-and-aft movement of the stick moved the canard and sideways movement controlled the tip-rudders. The canard was constructed with tubular spars, aluminum ribs and covered in standard aircraft fabric.

In the Early 1980s a Pterodactyl pilot named Jeff Ballas attended the Sun-N-Fun fly-in and was impressed with the mylar covering on the Lazair. He bought a roll of mylar and some tape, went home and re-covered his canard with the clear mylar. This experiment was a success. The handling of an Ascender with the lightweight mylar was much lighter and increased the nimble feeling of the aircraft.

The new model carried the name "Ptraveler", continuing the use of the silent letter "P" in Pterodactyl designs.

The new model was powered by the Cuyuna 430D direct drive engine and was introduced in 1980 at a price of USD3900.

Ascender
The Cuyuna 430D powerplant was greatly improved by the addition of a 2:1 belt reduction drive, allowing larger propellers of 54 inches diameter to be used. This produced more thrust and less noise. The modified powerplant was called the Cuyuna 430R.

Fitting the new powerplant into the Ptraveler drastically improved the aircraft's take-off and climb performance. The new model was named the "Ascender" for its improved climb rate and also in tribute to the Curtiss-Wright XP-55 Ascender, an early canard fighter design. In 1981 a complete kit cost USD4200.

Ascender II
The Ascender II was an improved Ascender with evolutionary changes incorporated. It had an improved muffler, re-located throttle and fiberglass spring rod main landing gear suspension.

Psounder
The Pterodactyl Psounder was a one-of-a kind Ascender II that was modified for an atmospheric research project at Colorado State University.

Ptug
The Ptug was a special hang glider towing version of the Ascender II that was modified with a special rigid bridle to ensure that the tow rope stayed clear of the propeller.

Ptiger
By adding a fiberglass tub in place of the basic Ascender II+ airframe, along with clipping the wing by 4 feet (1 m) to a 29-foot (9 m) span, the result was a new model named the "Ptiger". With the Cuyuna 430R the aircraft was capable of 75 mph (121 km/h) in level flight.

Under the rules of the time it could not be foot-launched and Pterodactyl advised purchasers to register their Ptigers as experimental amateur-built aircraft With the advent of FAR 103 and the alternate worksheet, the Ptiger conformed and became a legal Ultralight.

Ascender II+
The Ascender II+ was introduced in early 1982 and was aimed at the physically larger pilot. This redesigned model incorporated a wider 20-1/2 inch hang cage. All earlier models had a 15 3/4-inch-wide (400 mm) hang cage. It also had stronger upright struts and wing with 1-3/4 inch spars of 0.049 inch thickness, whereas all earlier models used 1-1/2 inch spars of 0.049 inch thickness and heavier 1/8 inch outer bottom cables.

The Ascender II+ sold for USD5260 in 1983.

Ascender II+2
The Ascender II+, with its additional structural strength lent itself to the creation of a two-seat trainer version. This was designed by adding an off-center "sidecar" frame to hold the second seat and was named the "Ascender II+2". There was no dual control installation, as both pilots had access to the single side-stick control.

The II+2 was first marketed in the middle of 1982 at a price of USD5560.

Light Flyer
The final aircraft design and produced by Pterodactyl was based on the Easy Riser wing and was a tribute to the Wright Flyer. The Light Flyer introduced practical improvements over the original Wright brothers design, such as wheeled landing gear instead of fixed skids, allowing taxiing. The aircraft was introduced in 1984 at a price of USD5400, but only about five were sold.

DFE Ascender III-A
The Ascender III-A is similar to the original Pterodactyl Pfledge. It lacks a canard and pitch control is by weight shift, although it incorporates some refinements, such as nose wheel steering. The 2003 price was USD6800.

DFE Ascender III-B
The Ascender III-B is similar to the Pterodactyl Ascender II with the addition of nose wheel steering and in 2003 sold for USD7900.

DFE Ascender III-C
The Ascender III-C is equivalent to the Pterodactyl Ascender II+ with the heavy-duty style airframe. It sold for USD8100 in 2003.

Like the Ascender II+, the Ascender III-C can be fitted with a sidecar to become a two-seat trainer version.

DFE Ascender III-T
The Ascender III-T is similar to the Pterodactyl Ascender II Ptug hang glider tug aircraft and incorporates a bridle to fit around the propeller to attach the tow rope to.

== Specifications (1979 model Pterodactyl Pfledge) ==
General characteristics

- Crew: one pilot
- Capacity: 225 lb (102 kg) useful load
- Length: 11 ft 6 in (3.5 m)
- Wingspan: 33 ft 0 in (10.15 m)
- Height: 10 ft 6 in (3.2 m)
- Wing area: 162 sq ft (15.3 m^{2})
- Empty weight: 125 lb (56.7 kg)
- Max takeoff weight: 350 lb (159 kg)
- Powerplant: 1 × Xenoah 242 two stroke , 16 hp (12 kW)

Performance

- Maximum speed: 50 mph (80 km/h, 43 kn)
- Cruise speed: 45 mph (73 km/h, 39 kn)
- Stall speed: 17 mph (28 km/h, 15 kn)
- Never exceed speed: 50 mph (80 km/h, 43 kn)
- Range: 56 mi (91 km, 49 nmi)
- Rate of climb: 300 ft/min (1.5 m/s)
- Wing loading: 2.16 lb/sq ft (10.4 kg/m^{2})
- Power/mass: 21.9 lb/hp (0.075 kW/kg)

== See also ==
Aircraft of comparable role, configuration, and era

- AmEagle American Eaglet
- AmeriPlanes Mitchell Wing A-10
- Chotia Weedhopper
- Eipper Quicksilver
- International Ultralite Banchee
- Manta Foxbat
- Moyes Dragonfly - also used for towing hang gliders
- Pinaire Ultra-Aire
- UFM Easy Riser
- Ultraflight Lazair
- Wings of Freedom Flitplane
- Zenair Zipper
