= Airborne Avenger =

Ultralight aircraft

Avenger
- An Avenger in flight

General information
- Type: Ultralight aircraft
- National origin: United States
- Manufacturer: Airborne Wing Design
- Status: Production completed

The Airborne Avenger is an American ultralight aircraft that was designed and produced by Airborne Wing Design in the early 1980s. The aircraft was supplied as a kit for amateur construction.

== Design and development ==
With three-axis controls, the Avenger was intended to appeal to conventional light aircraft pilots and was designed to comply with the US FAR 103 Ultralight Vehicles rules, including the category's maximum empty weight of 254 lb (115 kg). The Avenger's standard empty weight is 252 lb (114 kg). It has a strut-braced high-wing, single-seat, open cockpit, single pusher engine configuration, and is equipped with tricycle landing gear using nosewheel steering.

The aircraft is made from bolted-together aluminium tubing, with the wings and tail covered in Dacron sailcloth. The fuselage consists of a single aluminium keel tube that runs from the tail surfaces to the nose wheel. The cockpit is an open seat bolted to the main keel tube. Its 31 ft (9.4 m) span wing has an 80% double surface and features half-span ailerons. The wing is supported by dual parallel lift struts with jury struts. The tricycle landing gear has pneumatic shock suspension and the nosewheel is steerable. There is also a small tail caster as the aircraft sits on its tail with no occupant in the pilot's seat. The landing gear has notably high ground clearance for rough field operations and the engine, mounted on the wing trailing edge, drives a propeller that is protected by the low-mounted tailboom. The standard engine supplied was the Cuyuna 430 of 30 hp (22 kW).

Available as either a kit for home construction or as a complete aircraft, the Avenger was introduced in the early 1980s when the market was becoming saturated with ultralight designs; as a result, the company quickly went out of business and production ended.

== Specifications ==
Data from Cliche and Jane's

General characteristics

- Crew: one
- Length: 17 ft 0 in (5.18 m)
- Wingspan: 31 ft 0 in (9.45 m)
- Wing area: 135 sq ft (12.5 m^{2})
- Aspect ratio: 7:12
- Empty weight: 252 lb (114 kg)
- Max takeoff weight: 552 lb (250 kg)
- Fuel capacity: 5 U.S. gallons (19 L; 4.2 imp gal)
- Powerplant: 1 × Cuyuna 430 two-cylinder piston snowmobile engine, 30 hp (22 kW)
- Propellers: 2-bladed wooden

Performance

- Maximum speed: 60 mph (97 km/h, 52 kn)
- Cruise speed: 45 mph (72 km/h, 39 kn)
- Stall speed: 16 mph (26 km/h, 14 kn)
- Never exceed speed: 70 mph (110 km/h, 61 kn)
- Rate of climb: 700 ft/min (3.6 m/s)
- Wing loading: 4.09 lb/sq ft (19.95 kg/m^{2})
