= Rotec Rally =

Rally
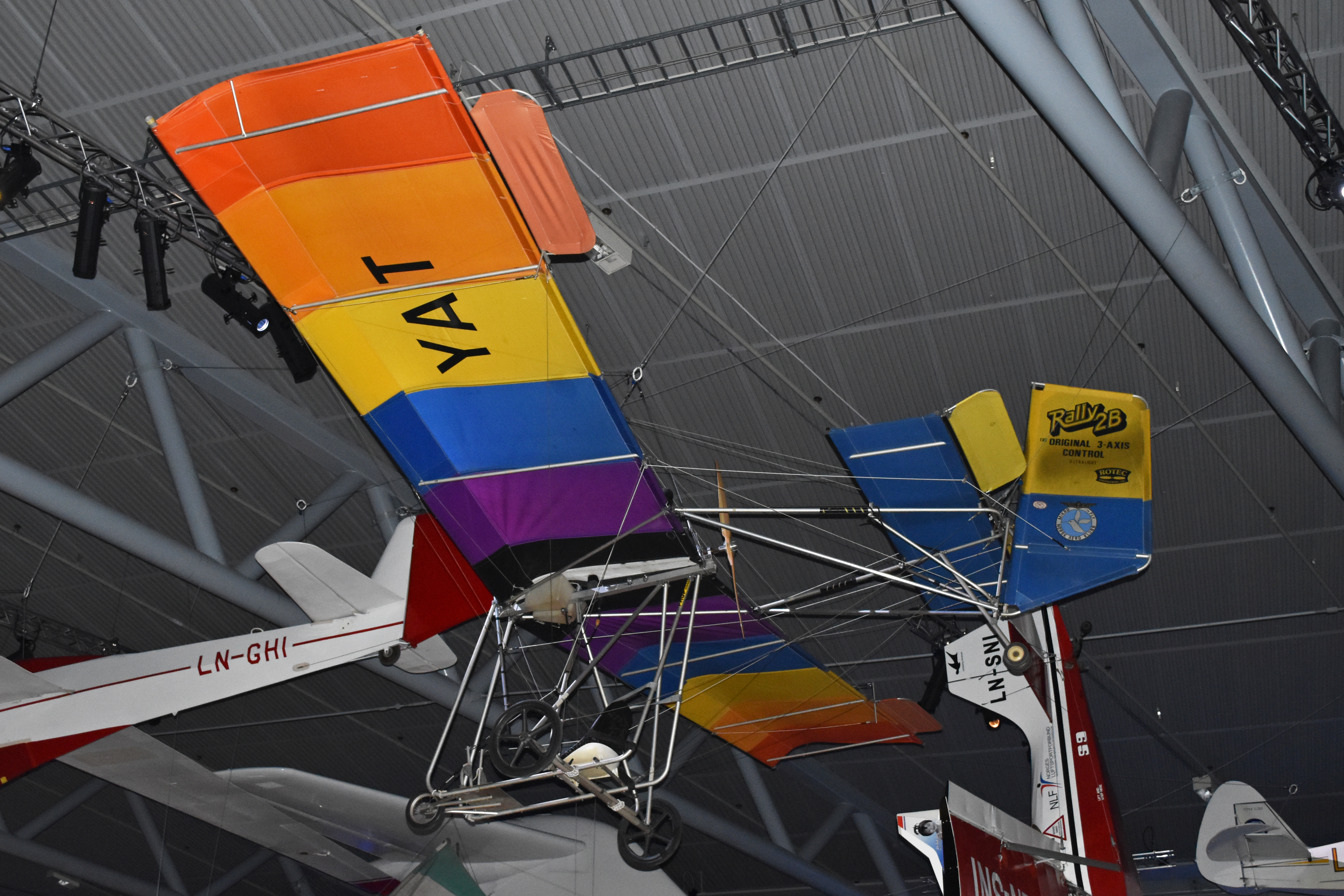

General information
- Type: Ultralight aircraft
- National origin: United States
- Manufacturer: Rotec Engineering
- Designer: Bill Adaska
- Status: Production completed
- Number built: more than 2000

History
- Introduction date: 1977

The Rotec Rally is a family of American ultralight aircraft that was designed by Bill Adaska in 1977 and produced by Rotec Engineering of Duncanville, Texas. Adaska had been an aeronautical engineer at Bell Helicopter and the French helicopter manufacturer, Aerospatiale, prior to starting Rotec. The aircraft was supplied as a kit for amateur construction.

== Design and development ==
The earliest Rallys were derived from hang gliders and comply with the US FAR 103 Ultralight Vehicles rules, including the category's maximum empty weight of 254 lb (115 kg). The Rally 2, for instance, has a standard empty weight of 145 lb (66 kg). The series all feature a cable-braced high-wing, a single-seat, open cockpit, conventional landing gear and a single engine in pusher configuration. The series was highly successful due to its low price and solid engineering.

The aircraft is made from aluminum tubing, with the flying surfaces covered in Dacron sailcloth. The wing is cable braced from a single kingpost mounted on top of the wing. The tailwheel is sprung.

The first Rallys were simple powered hang gliders and grew in sophistication as the model numbers increased. More than 2000 Rallys were delivered.

== Operational history ==
In reviewing the Rally, All-Aero said:

The Rotec [Rally] was really just a cheap copy of the Quicksilver MX. For example the rudder, elevator, and spoileron cables were just rope. To attach these to the control systems Adaska used plastic hooks, and you literally tied a knot in the rope to attach the hook! Plastic fittings were used on the elevator, rudder, and spoilerons. These would crack and break when exposed to UV and cold. With all this said the craft did fly, was quite forgiving, and easy to repair, and with some changes is a safe, fun, affordable flying machine.

== Variants ==
Rally 1
Early powered hang glider model introduced in 1977.
Rally 2
Improved powered hang glider model with weight shift control for pitch and roll with a seat-cable controlled rudder introduced in 1979. Standard engine is the Solo 210 of 20 hp (15 kW). It has a 145 lb (66 kg) empty weight and a cruise speed of 23 mph (37 km/h).
Rally 2B
Development of the Rally 2, with a conventional three-axis control system, including wing-mounted ailerons. In production models after 1981 the ailerons were replaced with spoilers for roll control. The control stick on the Rally 2B is hinged from the top, which simplified control runs to the high wing. Standard engine supplied was the Cuyuna 430 two-stroke.
Rally 3
Two seat version of the Rally 2B, introduced in 1981.
Rally Sport
Structurally strengthened version of the Rally 2B for aerobatics, with a 248 lb (112 kg) empty weight, 27 ft (8.2 m) wingspan and glide ratio of 8:1. Introduced in January 1983.

== Aircraft on display ==
- Southern Museum of Flight - Rally 2B
- Texas Air Museum - Stinson Chapter - Rally 2B

== Specifications (Rally 2B) ==
Data from Cliche

General characteristics

- Crew: one
- Wingspan: 31 ft (9.4 m)
- Wing area: 155 sq ft (14.4 m^{2})
- Empty weight: 218 lb (99 kg)
- Gross weight: 466 lb (211 kg)
- Fuel capacity: 2.9 U.S. gallons (11 L; 2.4 imp gal)
- Powerplant: 1 × Cuyuna 430 twin cylinder, two-stroke aircraft engine, 35 hp (26 kW)

Performance

- Cruise speed: 40 mph (64 km/h, 35 kn)
- Stall speed: 19 mph (31 km/h, 17 kn)
- Range: 78 mi (126 km, 68 nmi)
- g limits: +3.8/-1.0
- Maximum glide ratio: 7:1
- Rate of climb: 680 ft/min (3.5 m/s)
