= Mitchell Wing P-38 =

Homebuilt ultralight aircraft

P-38

General information
- Type: Ultralight aircraft
- National origin: United States
- Manufacturer: Mitchell Aircraft Corporation
- Designer: Jim Mead
- Status: Production completed

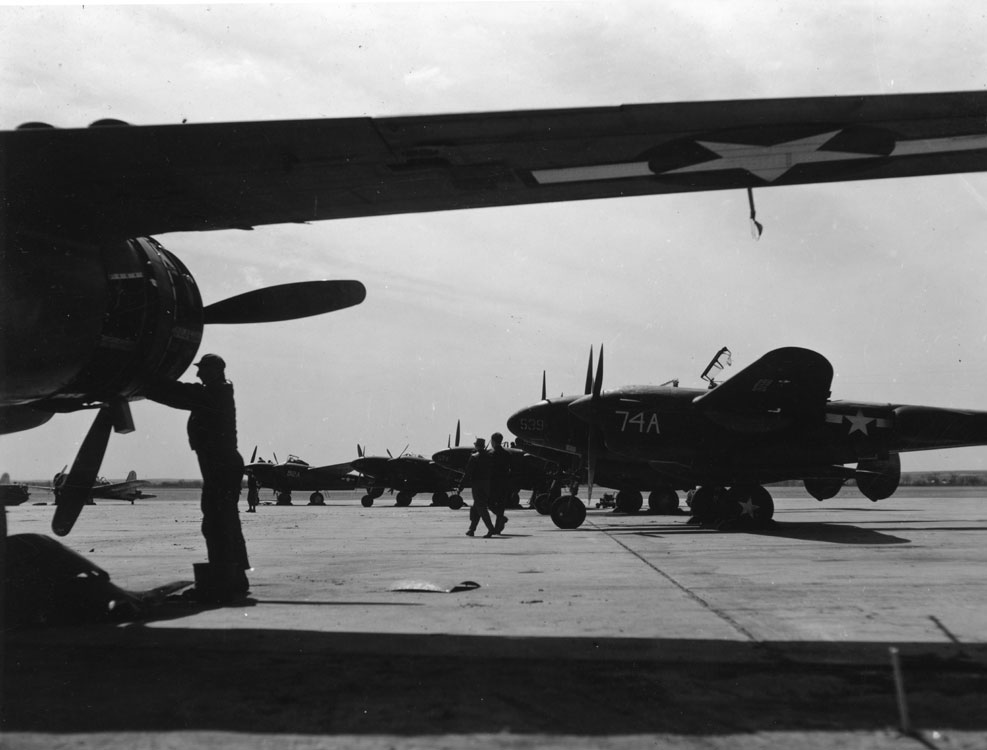

The Mitchell Wing P-38, also called the Lightning, is an American ultralight aircraft that was designed by Jim Mead and produced by Mitchell Aircraft Corporation. The aircraft was supplied as a kit for amateur construction.

== Design and development ==
The aircraft was designed to comply with the US FAR 103 Ultralight Vehicles rules, including the category's maximum empty weight of 254 lb (115 kg). The aircraft has a standard empty weight of 220 lb (100 kg), although some sources claim an empty weight of 305 lb (138 kg), putting it out of category. It features a strut-braced low-wing, a double tail, a single-seat, open cockpit, tricycle landing gear and a single engine in pusher configuration. The aircraft is named after the Second World War vintage Lockheed P-38 Lightning, with which it shares its dual tail layout.

The aircraft is made from aluminum tubing, with the wing leading edge made from birch plywood, supported by foam and wooden wing ribs. The wings and tail surfaces are covered in doped aircraft fabric. Its 28 ft (8.5 m) span wing employs a NACA 23015 airfoil and features flaperons. The wing is supported by lift struts that are mounted to a central inverted "V" kingpost. The landing gear has bungee cord suspension and the nose wheel is steerable. The Cuyuna 430R powerplant is mounted behind the pilot with the propeller above the twin tail booms

== Specifications (P-38) ==
Data from Cliche and the Virtual Ultralight Museum

General characteristics

- Crew: one
- Length: 17 ft (5.2 m)
- Wingspan: 28 ft (8.5 m)
- Height: 5 ft (1.5 m)
- Wing area: 120 sq ft (11 m^{2})
- Empty weight: 220 lb (100 kg)
- Gross weight: 700 lb (318 kg)
- Fuel capacity: 5 U.S. gallons (19 L; 4.2 imp gal)
- Powerplant: 1 × Cuyuna 430R twin cylinder, two-stroke aircraft engine, 35 hp (26 kW)

Performance

- Maximum speed: 65 mph (105 km/h, 56 kn)
- Cruise speed: 55 mph (89 km/h, 48 kn)
- Stall speed: 32 mph (51 km/h, 28 kn)
- Range: 110 mi (180 km, 96 nmi)
- Service ceiling: 12,000 ft (3,700 m)
- Maximum glide ratio: 7:1
- Rate of climb: 500 ft/min (2.5 m/s)
- Rate of sink: 400 ft/min (2.0 m/s)
- Wing loading: 5.8 lb/sq ft (28 kg/m^{2})
