= Manta Foxbat =

American ultralight aircraft

Foxbat

General information
- Type: Ultralight aircraft
- National origin: United States
- Manufacturer: Manta Products Inc
- Designer: Bill Armour
- Status: Production completed

The Manta Foxbat is an American ultralight aircraft that was designed by Bill Armour and produced by Manta Products Inc of Oakland, California. The aircraft was supplied as a kit for amateur construction.

== Design and development ==
The Foxbat was designed to comply with the US FAR 103 Ultralight Vehicles rules, including the category's maximum empty weight of 254 lb (115 kg). The aircraft has a standard empty weight of 200 lb (91 kg). It features a cable-braced high-wing, a single-seat, open cockpit, tricycle landing gear and a single engine in pusher configuration.

The aircraft is made from bolted-together aluminum tubing, with the wing covered in Dacron sailcloth. Its 32.5 ft (9.9 m) span wing is supported by cables strung from an inverted V style kingpost. The wing is derived from the Manta Fledge hang glider wing. The control system is unconventional and uses a hang glider style control bar for weight shift control of pitch and roll, augmented with wing tip rudders for yaw, activated by hand controls on the control bar. The fuselage is an open frame structure that is attached to the wing via a flexible single point mount, to allow weight shift control. The pilot is accommodated on a sling seat. The landing gear is of tricycle configuration, with a steerable nose wheel.

The Foxbat wing can be folded for ground transport and storage.

== Variants ==
Fledge III
Initial model, developed from the Manta Fledge hang glider
FX-3
Model powered by Cuyuna 430 of 30 hp (22 kW) or a Zenoah G-25 of 20 hp (15 kW)
Foxbat
Model powered by a Kawasaki 440 of 38 hp (28 kW)

== Specifications (FX-3) ==
Data from Cliche and the Virtual Ultralight Museum

General characteristics

- Crew: one
- Length: 8 ft (2.4 m)
- Wingspan: 32 ft 6 in (9.91 m)
- Wing area: 157 sq ft (14.6 m^{2})
- Empty weight: 190 lb (86 kg)
- Gross weight: 425 lb (193 kg)
- Fuel capacity: 5 U.S. gallons (19 L; 4.2 imp gal)
- Powerplant: 1 × Cuyuna 430 , 30 hp (22 kW)
- Propellers: 2-bladed wooden

Performance

- Cruise speed: 35 mph (56 km/h, 30 kn)
- Stall speed: 22 mph (35 km/h, 19 kn)
- Range: 100 mi (160 km, 87 nmi)
- Endurance: 2.75
- Maximum glide ratio: 12:1
- Rate of climb: 400 ft/min (2.0 m/s)
- Wing loading: 2.7 lb/sq ft (13 kg/m^{2})

== See also ==
Aircraft of comparable role, configuration, and era

- Pterodactyl Ascender
