= Vintage Ultralight SR-1 Hornet =

American homebuilt aircraft

SR-1 Hornet

General information
- Type: Homebuilt aircraft
- National origin: United States
- Manufacturer: Vintage Ultralight and Lightplane Association
- Status: Plans no longer available (2021)
- Number built: At least two

History
- Introduction date: Early 1980s

The Vintage Ultralight SR-1 Hornet is an American homebuilt aircraft produced by the Vintage Ultralight and Lightplane Association of Marietta, Georgia, introduced in the early 1980s. The aircraft was supplied in the form of plans for amateur construction, although plans are no longer available.

== Design and development ==
The aircraft was designed to comply with the US FAR 103 Ultralight Vehicles rules, including the category's maximum empty weight of 254 lb (115 kg). The aircraft has a standard empty weight of 245 lb (111 kg).

The SR-1 Hornet features a strut-braced and cable-braced biplane layout, a single-seat open cockpit, fixed conventional landing gear with a steerable tail wheel, and a single engine in pusher configuration.

The aircraft is made from bolted-together aluminum tubing, with its flying surfaces covered in doped aircraft fabric. Its 33.00 ft (10.1 m) span wing has a wing area of 220.0 sq ft (20.44 m^{2}). The Hornet has the largest wing area and lightest wing loading of any ultralight of its period. The acceptable power range is 30 to 35 hp (22 to 26 kW) and the standard engine used is the 35 hp (26 kW) Cuyuna 430 powerplant. The engine is mounted between four tubes that support the tail surfaces.

The SR-1 Hornet has a typical empty weight of 245 lb (111 kg) and a gross weight of 600 lb (270 kg), giving a useful load of 355 lb (161 kg). With full fuel of 5 U.S. gallons (19 L; 4.2 imp gal) the payload for the pilot and baggage is 325 lb (147 kg).

The standard day, sea level, no wind, take off and landing roll with a 35 hp (26 kW) engine is 75 ft (23 m).

The designer estimated the construction time from the supplied plans as 250 hours.

== Operational history ==
The Hornet was widely sold in the United States in the 1980s.

In the United States ultralights are not required to be registered, and in April 2014 no examples were in fact registered in the United States with the Federal Aviation Administration, although a total of two had been registered at one time.

== Specifications (SR-1 Hornet) ==
Data from AeroCrafter and the Virtual Ultralight Museum

General characteristics

- Crew: one
- Wingspan: 33 ft 0 in (10.06 m)
- Wing area: 220.0 sq ft (20.44 m^{2})
- Empty weight: 245 lb (111 kg)
- Gross weight: 600 lb (272 kg)
- Fuel capacity: 5 U.S. gallons (19 L; 4.2 imp gal)
- Powerplant: 1 × Cuyuna 430 twin cylinder, air-cooled, two stroke aircraft engine, 35 hp (26 kW)
- Propellers: 2-bladed wooden fixed pitch

Performance

- Maximum speed: 63 mph (101 km/h, 55 kn)
- Cruise speed: 50 mph (80 km/h, 43 kn)
- Stall speed: 16 mph (26 km/h, 14 kn)
- Rate of climb: 800 ft/min (4.1 m/s)
- Wing loading: 2.7 lb/sq ft (13 kg/m^{2})
