= Pinaire Ultra-Aire =

American ultralight aircraft

Ultra-Aire

General information
- Type: Ultralight aircraft
- National origin: United States
- Manufacturer: Pinaire Engineering
- Status: Production completed

The Pinaire Ultra-Aire is an American ultralight aircraft that was designed and produced by Pinaire Engineering. The aircraft was supplied as a kit for amateur construction.

== Design and development ==
The aircraft was designed to comply with the US FAR 103 Ultralight Vehicles rules, including the category's maximum empty weight of 254 lb (115 kg). The aircraft has a standard empty weight of 252 lb (114 kg). It features a cable-braced high-wing, canard elevator, a single-seat, open cockpit, tricycle landing gear and a single engine in pusher configuration.

The aircraft is made from bolted-together aluminum tubing, with its flying surfaces covered in Dacron sailcloth. Its compact single-surface 26 ft (7.9 m) span wing is supported by cables attached to a simple tube kingpost. The pilot is accommodated on a suspended sling seat. The control system is two-axis with pitch controlled by a canard elevator attached to the side-stick. Roll and yaw are controlled by wing tip rudders also controlled by the side-stick. The landing gear features a steerable nose wheel, also controlled by the side-stick. The standard engine supplied with the kit was the Cuyuna UL II-02 twin cylinder, two-stroke powerplant of 35 hp (26 kW).

The aircraft was carefully tested using sandbag loading to +6 and -4 g without failure. Reviewer Andre Cliche describes the design as "well engineered". The Ultra-Aire can be quickly dismantled for ground transportation or storage.

== Specifications (Ultra-Aire) ==
Data from Cliche and the Virtual Ultralight Museum

General characteristics

- Crew: one
- Length: 14 ft 2 in (4.32 m)
- Wingspan: 26 ft (7.9 m)
- Height: 6 ft 11 in (2.11 m)
- Wing area: 130 sq ft (12 m^{2})
- Empty weight: 252 lb (114 kg)
- Gross weight: 552 lb (250 kg)
- Fuel capacity: 5 U.S. gallons (19 L; 4.2 imp gal)
- Powerplant: 1 × Cuyuna UL II-02 twin cylinder two-stroke, 35 hp (26 kW)

Performance

- Maximum speed: 63 mph (101 km/h, 55 kn)
- Cruise speed: 40 mph (64 km/h, 35 kn)
- Stall speed: 22 mph (35 km/h, 19 kn)
- g limits: +6/-7
- Maximum glide ratio: 8:1
- Rate of climb: 600 ft/min (3.0 m/s)

== See also ==
Aircraft of comparable role, configuration, and era

- Pterodactyl Ascender
