= Cuyuna 430 =

Cuyuna 340 & 430
- Type: Two-stroke aeroengine
- National origin: United States
- Manufacturer: Cuyuna Development Company
- First run: 1979
- Major applications: Pterodactyl Ascender

The Cuyuna 430 and Cuyuna 340 are a family of two-stroke, twin-cylinder piston snowmobile engines that were redesigned to serve as ultralight aircraft powerplants.

== Development ==
While developing the Pterodactyl Pfledge flying wing ultralight in the late 1970s, designer Jack McCornack experimented with a number of possible engines. Early flights used a German-made Sachs engine, but the high exchange rate and long lead times for this engine convinced him to try other options.

McCornack settled on a snowmobile engine produced by the Cuyuna Development Company as having the best potential. In 1979 he modified the engine with a crankcase extension, an additional main bearing, lowered the compression ratio using an additional head gasket and substituted a smaller 32 mm (1.26 in) Mikuni carburetor, amongst other modifications. The original snowmobile engine produced 40 hp (30 kW). Lowering the compression ratio not only de-rated the engine, but also made pull-starting easier and allowed it to run on lower-octane regular auto fuel. The resulting engine worked well, was de-rated to produce 30 hp (22 kW) at 5,500 rpm and proved reliable in service.

Citing liability concerns over producing a two-stroke engine for human-carrying aircraft applications, Cuyuna declined to produce the modified engine. Instead, Cuyuna decided that the resulting engine was different enough from the base snowmobile engine that they would supply assembled and test-run shortblocks as parts to McCornack's company, Pterodactyl Limited, who would then complete the engines and be the manufacturer, allowing Cuyuna to continue producing snowmobile engines.

After two years of poor sales of snowmobiles, due to a dearth of snow and no lawsuits against Pterodactyl Limited regarding the engine, Cuyuna agreed to build the engines themselves.

The 430 was also produced in a reduced 2.362 in (60.0 mm) bore version called the 340. The modification reduced its displacement to 339 cc and output to 25 hp (19 kW) at 5500 rpm. The standard 430 has a bore of 2.658 in (67.5 mm).

== Variants ==
340D
Direct drive version, 25 hp (19 kW) at 5500 rpm, recoil starter.
340R
Reduction drive version using a belt drive system, 25 hp (19 kW) at 5500 rpm, recoil starter
430D
Direct drive version, 30 hp (22 kW) at 5500 rpm, recoil starter.
430F
Reduction drive version using a 3:1 gearbox system, dual carburetors, producing 45 hp (34 kW).
430R
Reduction drive version using a belt drive system, 30 hp (22 kW) at 5500 rpm, recoil starter
UL II
35 hp (26 kW) version

== Applications ==
- Advanced Aviation Cobra
- Advanced Aviation Husky
- Airborne Avenger
- Airmass Sunburst
- American Aerolights Eagle
- Chandelle Mk IV
- Eastern Ultralights Snoop
- Fletcher Hercules
- Goldwing Ltd Goldwing
- Goodwin Tri-Moto
- Hovey Delta Bird
- International Ultralite Banchee
- Kolb Ultrastar
- LEAF Trike

Malibu Grand Prix Virage open wheel kart w/ CVT belt drive

- Manta FX-3
- Meadowlark Ultralight Meadowlark
- Mitchell Wing P-38
- Pinaire Ultra-Aire
- Pterodactyl Ascender
- RagWing RW4 Midwing Sport
- Robertson B1-RD
- Rotec Rally 2B
- Star Flight Tristar
- Swallow Aeroplane Company Swallow B
- Ultra-Fab Sundowner
- Vintage Ultralight SR-1 Hornet
- Waspair HM 81 Tomcat

== Specifications (430D) ==
Data from Cuyuna & McCornack

=== General characteristics ===
- Type: Direct drive two-stroke piston aircraft engine
- Bore: 2.658 in (68 mm)
- Stroke: 2.362 in (60 mm)
- Displacement: 428 cc (26.11 cubic inches)
- Dry weight: 65 lb (29 kg)
- Designer: McCornack/Cuyuna

=== Components ===
- Fuel type: Regular auto fuel
- Oil system: 40:1 premixed fuel and oil
- Cooling system: fan forced air

=== Performance ===
- Power output: 30 hp (22 kW)
- Compression ratio: 12.5:1
- Power-to-weight ratio: 0.46 hp/lb (0.76 kW/kg)
