= Rotec Engineering =

American aircraft manufacturer

- Company type: Privately held company
- Industry: Aerospace
- Founded: 1977
- Founder: William Adaska
- Defunct: after 1984
- Fate: Out of business
- Headquarters: Duncanville, Texas, United States
- Products: Kit aircraft

Rotec Engineering was an American aircraft manufacturer, founded in 1977 by William Adaska and located in Duncanville, Texas. Adaska had worked as an aeronautical engineer for Bell Helicopter and the French helicopter manufacturer, Aérospatiale prior to starting Rotec.

Rotec Engineering specialized in the design and manufacture of ultralight aircraft in the form of kits for amateur construction and ready-to-fly aircraft under the US FAR 103 Ultralight Vehicles rules.

The company's most successful line was the Rotec Rally that was designed by Adaska as a motor glider in 1977 and praised by reviewers for its sound engineering and low price. The Rally series was produced in several models in large numbers, including the Rally 2 in 1979, 2B, the Rally 3 two place in 1981 and the aerobatic Rally Sport in January 1983. The design was continually improved through the early 1980s. The Rally line established the company one of the most successful ultralight manufacturing concerns of that period. The company offered a "buy five get one free" plan, whereby purchasers could order five aircraft, four for their friends and get their own aircraft at no cost.

The follow-on Rotec Panther was initially aimed at the US Experimental - Amateur-built category, but later lightened by installing a smaller cockpit fairing to give it an empty weight of 250 lb (113 kg), allowing it to be flown as a US FAR 103 ultralight.

The company seems to have gone out of business after the 1984 introduction of the Panther.

== Aircraft ==
Summary of aircraft built by Rotec Engineering
Model name	First flight	Number built	Type
Rotec Rally	early 1980s		Single seat ultralight aircraft
Rotec Panther	1984		Single seat kit aircraft
