= Meadowlark Ultralight Meadowlark =

American ultralight aircraft

Meadowlark

General information
- Type: Ultralight aircraft
- National origin: United States
- Manufacturer: Meadowlark Ultralight Corporation
- Designer: Jim Higgs
- Status: Production completed

History
- Introduction date: 1982

The Meadowlark Ultralight Meadowlark is an American ultralight aircraft that was designed by Jim Higgs and produced by the Meadowlark Ultralight Corporation. The Meadowlark was supplied only as a factory completed aircraft.

== Design and development ==
The aircraft was designed to comply with the US FAR 103 Ultralight Vehicles rules, including the category's maximum empty weight of 254 lb (115 kg). The aircraft has a standard empty weight of 251 lb (114 kg). It features a strut-braced high-wing, a single-seat, open cockpit, tricycle landing gear and a single engine in tractor configuration.

The aircraft fuselage is made from aluminum tubing. Its 35 ft (10.7 m) span wing is constructed in a similar manner to the Ultraflight Lazair's wing. It is built from D-cell spar and leading edge, with foam ribs bonded to the spar. The wing is then covered with transparent Mylar film for covering. The wing incorporates a quick-folding mechanism that allows it to be folded back along the fuselage for ground transport or for storage. The pilot is accommodated on an open seat without a windshield. The landing gear features suspension on all wheels and a steerable nosewheel. The Cuyuna 430R engine of 30 hp (22 kW) is mounted in front of the wing, above the pilot.

Due to its introduction just before the collapse of the US ultralight industry in 1984, the design was not a commercial success and only a small number were completed and sold.

== Specifications (Meadowlark) ==
Data from Cliche and the Virtual Ultralight Museum

General characteristics

- Crew: one
- Length: 19 ft (5.8 m)
- Wingspan: 35 ft (11 m)
- Height: 7 ft 4 in (2.24 m)
- Wing area: 136 sq ft (12.6 m^{2})
- Empty weight: 251 lb (114 kg)
- Gross weight: 550 lb (249 kg)
- Fuel capacity: 3.7 U.S. gallons (14 L; 3.1 imp gal)
- Powerplant: 1 × Cuyuna 430R twin cylinder, two-stroke aircraft engine, 30 hp (22 kW)

Performance

- Maximum speed: 55 mph (89 km/h, 48 kn)
- Cruise speed: 35 mph (56 km/h, 30 kn)
- Stall speed: 22 mph (35 km/h, 19 kn)
- Range: 90 mi (140 km, 78 nmi)
- g limits: +3.8/-1.5
- Maximum glide ratio: 8:1 at 30 mph (48 km/h)
- Rate of climb: 1,000 ft/min (5.1 m/s)
- Rate of sink: 400 ft/min (2.0 m/s)
- Wing loading: 4.04 lb/sq ft (19.7 kg/m^{2})
