= UFM Easy Riser =

American ultralight aircraft and glider

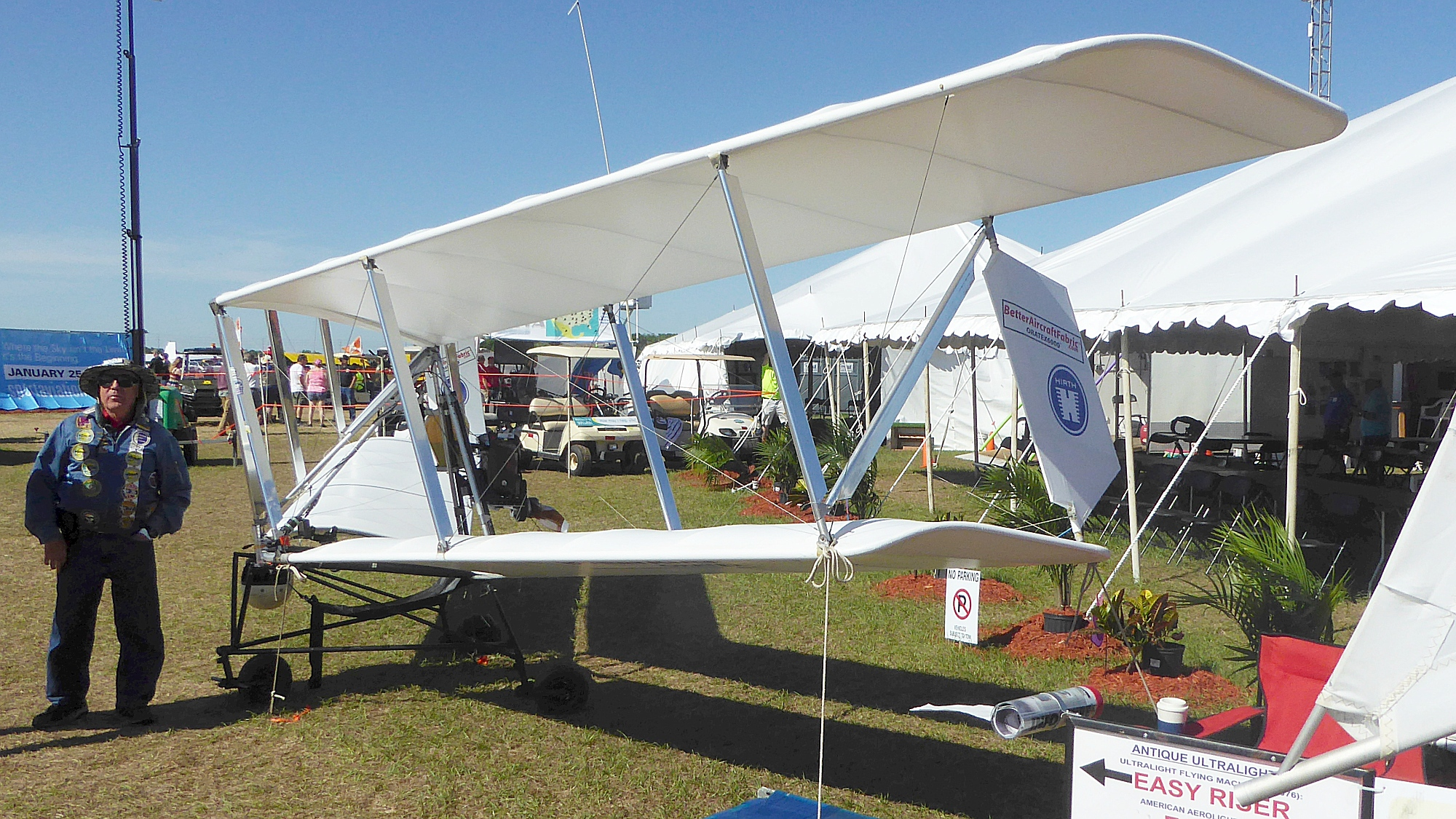

General information
- Type: Hang glider & Ultralight aircraft
- National origin: United States
- Manufacturer: Ultralight Flying Machines
- Designer: Larry Mauro & John Moody
- Status: In limited production (hang glider version, 2002)

History
- First flight: 1975 (powered ultralight)
- Variants: Mauro Solar Riser; Pterodactyl Light Flyer

The UFM Easy Riser is an American swept wing biplane hang glider that was first powered in 1975, becoming the first modern ultralight aircraft. The Easy Riser was still in production as an unpowered glider in 2002 by Ultralight Flying Machines.

== Design and development ==
The Easy Riser was developed by Larry Mauro from the earlier Kiceniuk Icarus II biplane hang glider. An engine was installed by John Moody in 1975 so the glider could be launched from flat terrain.

Early powered versions consisted simply of a motor added to the foot-launched hang glider version with control by a combination of weight shift for pitch and tip rudders for roll and yaw, with the tip rudders used together as air brakes. Because many pilots could not run fast enough to achieve take-off, wheeled tricycle gear was added. The aircraft exhibited poor pitch stability, so a horizontal stabilizer and elevator were added. Finally, on later versions, the tip rudders were replaced with a tail-mounted rudder.

The Easy Riser is constructed with an aluminium structure and stamped ribs, covered in doped aircraft fabric covering, Mylar or other coverings. The pilot sits on a fabric sling seat. Engines used include the 11 hp (8 kW) McCulloch MAC-101, 15 hp (11 kW) Hirth F-36 and Solo 210.

Easy Risers were produced in large numbers until the ultralight market downturn of the early 1980s when the type was taken out of production. Later, the unpowered glider version was put back into limited production.

In 1979, Larry Mauro installed solar cells and an electric motor on a stock Easy Riser and the resulting Mauro Solar Riser become the first solar powered aircraft to carry a person aloft.

== Aircraft on display ==
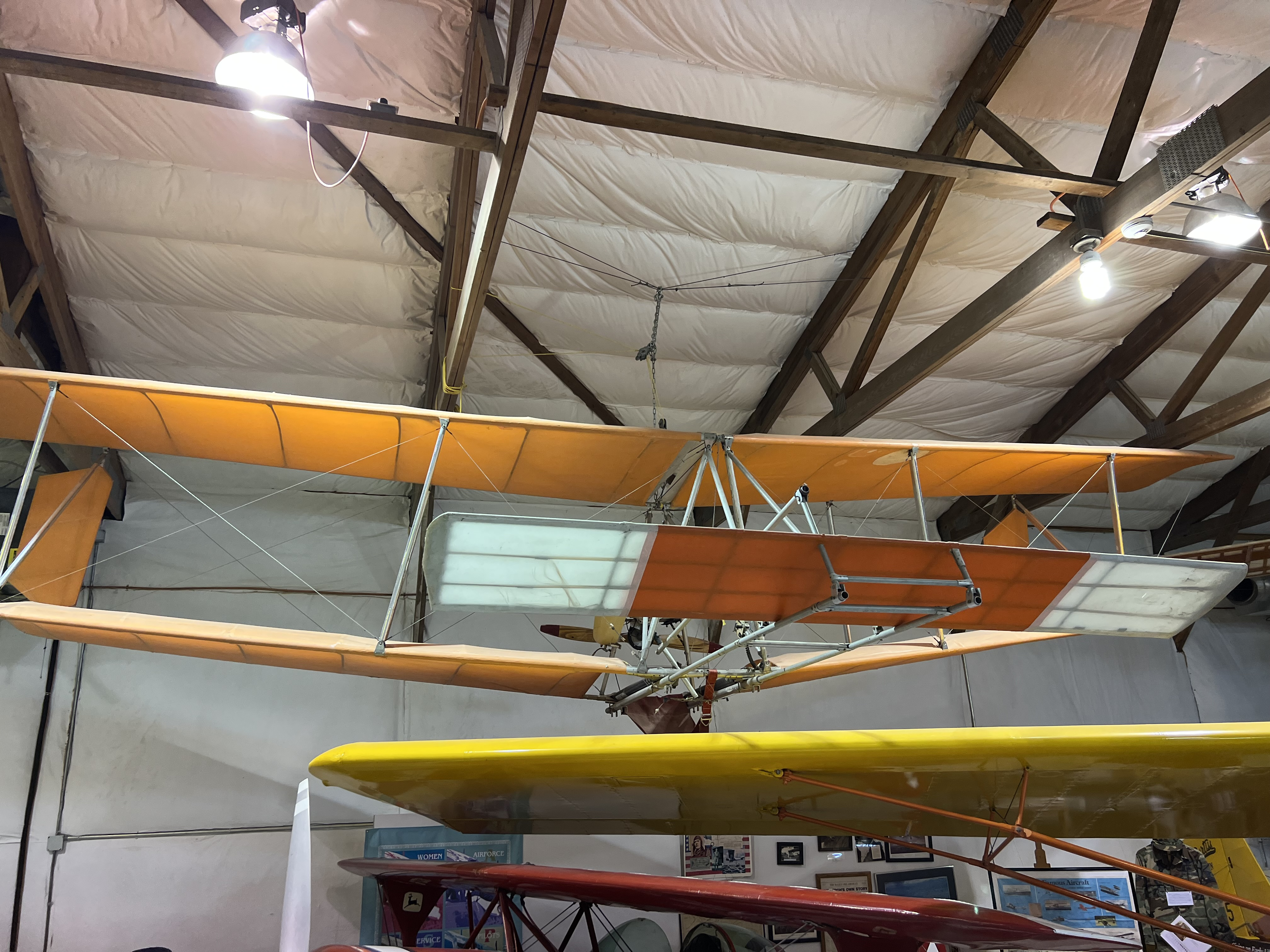
Easy Rider ultralight at the Iowa Aviation Museum. This aircraft was modified with a canard.

- Canadian Air & Space Museum - Easy Riser used by Bill Lishman in projects to teach birds to migrate
- EAA AirVenture Museum - two Easy Risers and the Solar Riser.
- Iowa Aviation Museum - one 1975 Easy Rider ultralight
- US Southwest Soaring Museum - Easy Riser

== Specifications (Easy Riser ultralight) ==
Data from EAA

General characteristics

- Crew: one
- Length: 9 ft 0 in (2.74 m)
- Wingspan: 30 ft 0 in (9.14 m)
- Height: 4 ft (1.2 m)
- Wing area: 170 sq ft (16 m^{2})
- Empty weight: 120 lb (54 kg)
- Gross weight: 320 lb (145 kg)
- Powerplant: 1 × McCulloch MAC-101 two-stroke, single cylinder engine, 11 hp (8.2 kW)
- Propellers: 2-bladed wooden, 4 ft 6 in (1.37 m) diameter

Performance

- Maximum speed: 40 mph (64 km/h, 35 kn)
- Cruise speed: 25 mph (40 km/h, 22 kn)
- Stall speed: 20 mph (32 km/h, 17 kn)
- Range: 100 mi (160 km, 87 nmi)
- Service ceiling: 9,000 ft (2,700 m)
- Rate of climb: 300 ft/min (1.5 m/s)
- Wing loading: 1.88 lb/sq ft (9.2 kg/m^{2})

== See also ==
Aircraft of comparable role, configuration, and era

- Eipper Quicksilver
- Pterodactyl Ascender
