= International Ultralight Banchee =

Banchee

General information
- Type: Ultralight aircraft
- National origin: United States
- Manufacturer: International Ultralight Aviation
- Designer: Brian Jensen, Gil Kinzie and Nick Nichols
- Status: Production completed

The International Ultralight Banchee (also called the Banshee) is an American ultralight aircraft designed by Brian Jensen, Gil Kinzie and Nick Nichols and produced by International Ultralight Aviation. The aircraft was supplied as a kit for amateur construction.

== Design and development ==
The aircraft closely resembles the Pterodactyl Ptraveler, and, like the Pterodactyl, was designed to comply with the US FAR 103 Ultralight Vehicles rules, including the category's maximum empty weight of 254 lb (115 kg). The Banchee has a standard empty weight of 251 lb (114 kg). It features a cable-braced high-wing, single-seat, open cockpit, single pusher engine configuration, and is equipped with tricycle landing gear.

The aircraft is made from bolted-together aluminum tubing, with the wing covered with Dacron sailcloth. Its 34 ft (10.4 m) span wing is cable-braced from an inverted "V" kingpost, has 4° of dihedral and 15° of sweepback. The three-axis control system is unconventional, with pitch controlled by an all-flying canard, yaw by wingtip rudders and roll by spoilerons, all actuated by a single side-stick, the aircraft lacking rudder pedals. The cockpit is an open sling seat without a windshield. The tricycle landing gear features suspension on all wheels. The Cuyuna 430R engine is mounted behind the pilot and can produce 35 hp (26 kW) at 6250 rpm.

A ballistic parachute was available as an option, as was an electric starter; the company claimed that the Banchee could be rigged in 35 minutes.

== Accidents and incidents ==
On 21 May 1983 during a demonstration flight at St. George, Utah a Banchee suffered a cable swaging failure at an altitude of 50 to 60 ft (15 to 18 m) that resulted in one fatality. The US National Transportation Safety Board cited the probable causes as improper maintenance and quality assurance on the part of the manufacturer. The company went out of business shortly after the accident.

== Specifications (Banchee) ==
Data from Cliche

General characteristics

- Crew: one
- Wingspan: 34 ft 0 in (10.36 m)
- Wing area: 170 sq ft (16 m^{2})
- Aspect ratio: 6.8:1
- Empty weight: 251 lb (114 kg)
- Gross weight: 600 lb (272 kg)
- Fuel capacity: 5 U.S. gallons (19 L; 4.2 imp gal)
- Powerplant: 1 × Cuyuna 430R twin cylinder, two-stroke engine with a 2:1 belt reduction drive, 35 hp (26 kW)
- Propellers: 2-bladed wooden, 4 ft 6 in (1.37 m) diameter

Performance

- Maximum speed: 55 mph (89 km/h, 48 kn)
- Cruise speed: 50 mph (80 km/h, 43 kn)
- Stall speed: 24 mph (39 km/h, 21 kn)
- Never exceed speed: 65 mph (105 km/h, 56 kn)
- Range: 120 mi (190 km, 100 nmi)
- Service ceiling: 14,500 ft (4,400 m)
- g limits: +6/-3 (ultimate load limit)
- Maximum glide ratio: 12:1
- Rate of climb: 1,000 ft/min (5.1 m/s)
- Rate of sink: 350 ft/min (1.8 m/s)
- Wing loading: 3.5 lb/sq ft (17 kg/m^{2})
