= American Cordillera =

Series of mountain ranges in the western Americas

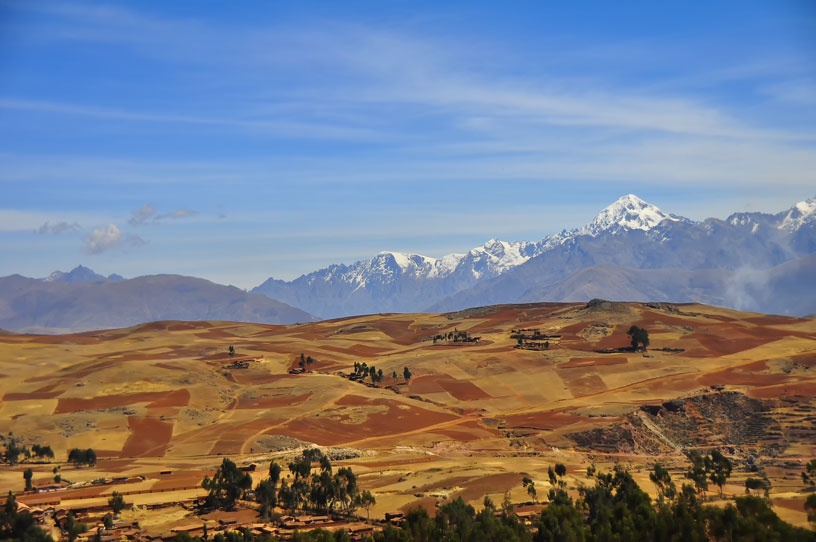
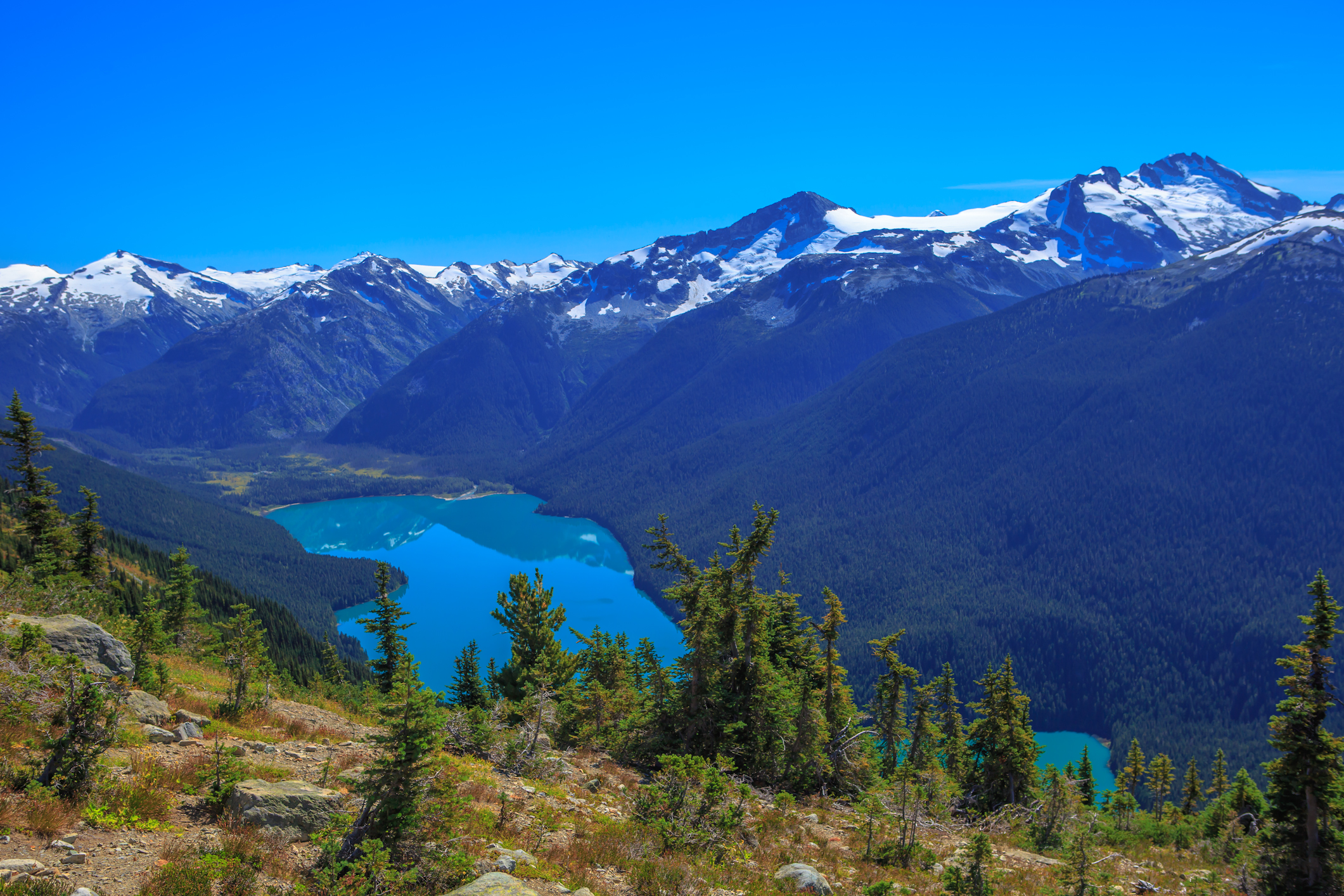
- Andes in Peru Coast Mountains in British Columbia, Canada

Highest point
- Peak: Aconcagua, Las Heras Department, Mendoza, Argentina
- Elevation: 6,961 m (22,838 ft)

Geography
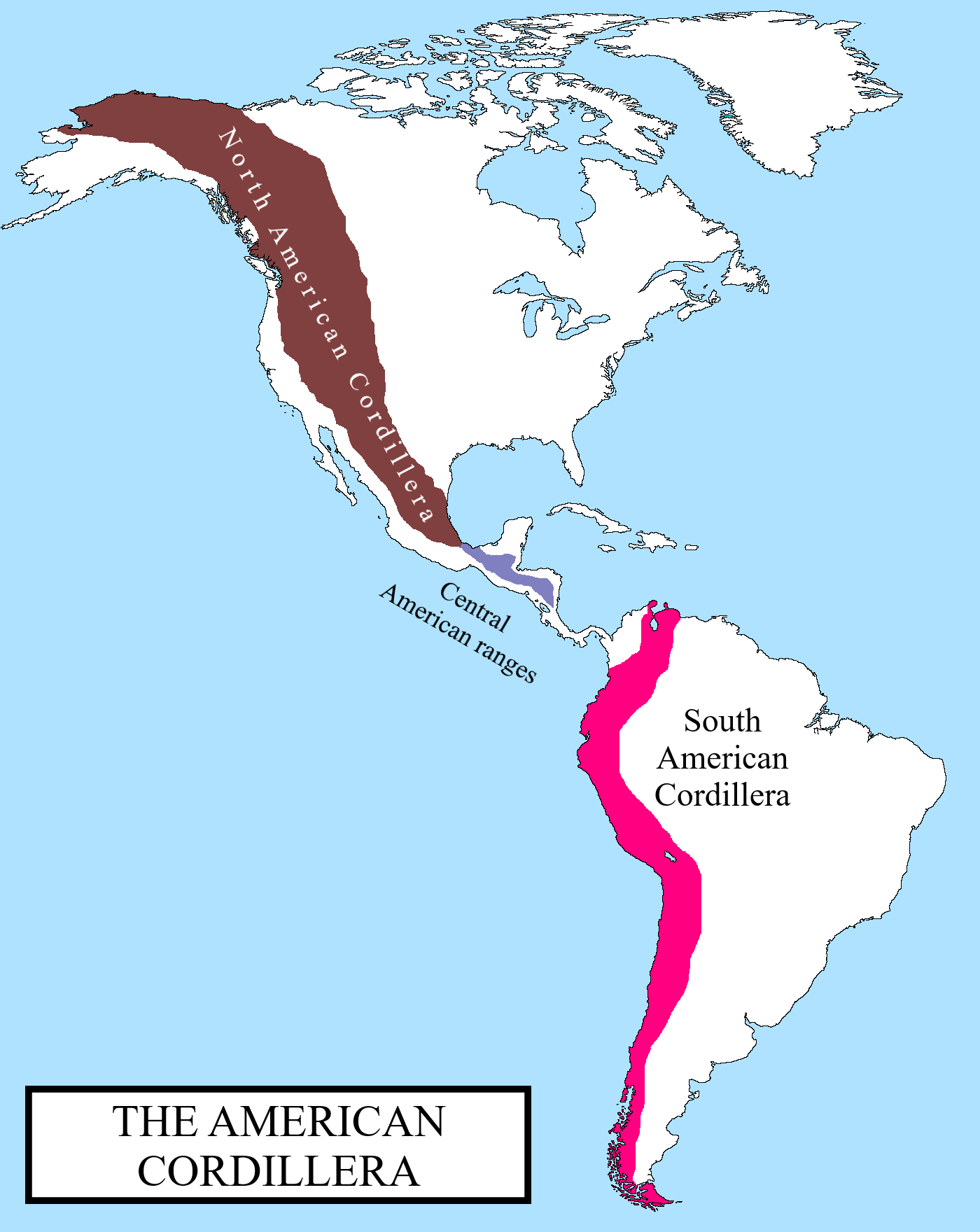
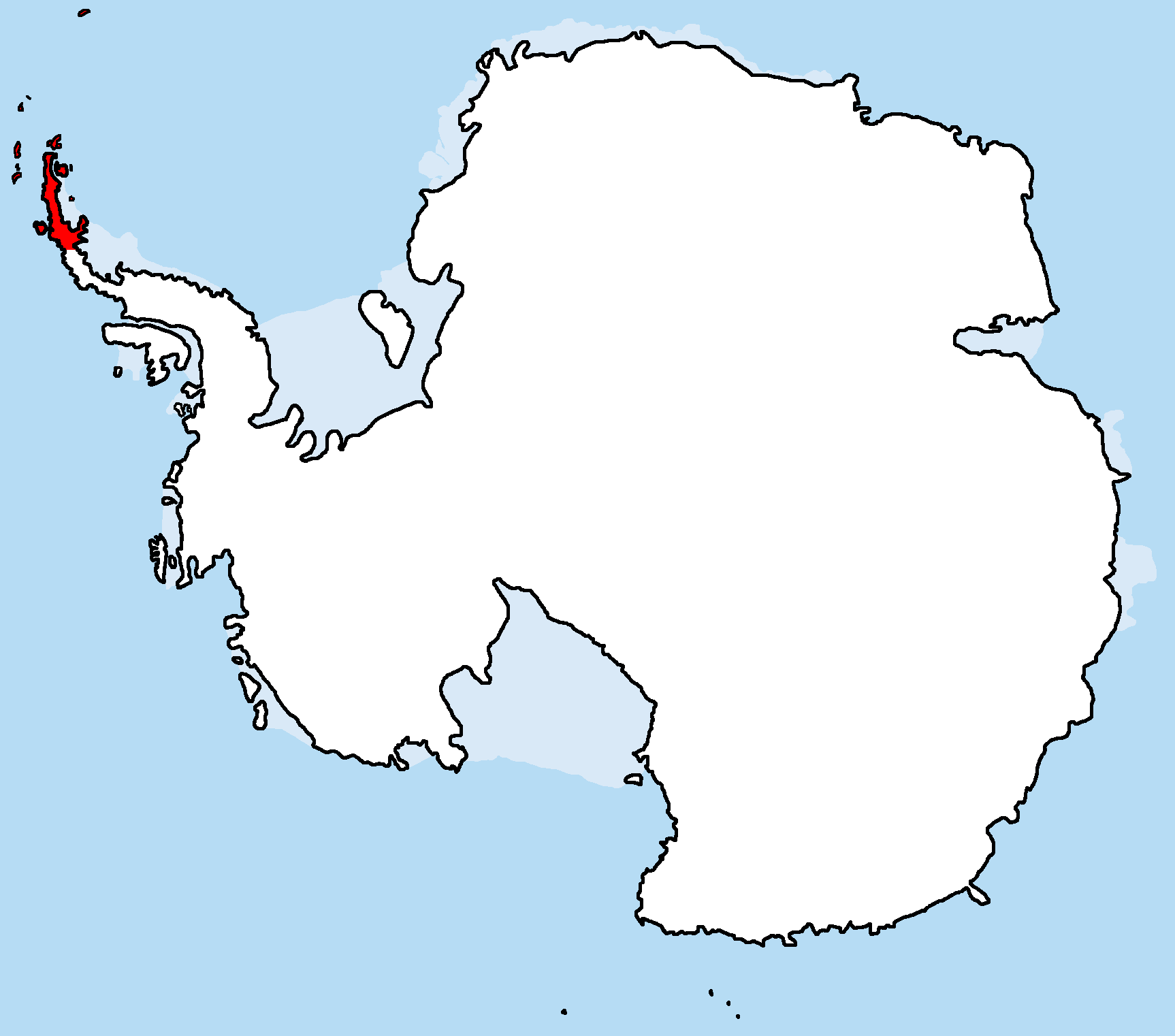
- Map of the Americas, showcasing the North American Cordillera in maroon, the mountains of Central America in lavender, and the South American Cordillera in pink. Map of Antarctica, showcasing the extension of the American Cordillera into Graham Land in the northwest.
- Countries: United States; Canada; Mexico; Guatemala; El Salvador; Honduras; Nicaragua; Costa Rica; Panama; Colombia; Venezuela; Ecuador; Peru; Bolivia; Argentina; Chile

The American Cordillera (/ˌkɔːrdəlˈjɛrə/ KOR-dəl-YERR-ə) is a chain of mountain ranges (cordilleras) consisting of an almost continuous sequence of mountain ranges that form the western "backbone" of the Americas. It is also the backbone of the volcanic arc that forms the eastern half of the Pacific Ring of Fire. Aconcagua is the highest peak.

== Description ==
=== North America ===
The overlapping and parallel ranges begin in the north with the Alaska Range and Brooks Range in Alaska, and run through the Yukon into British Columbia. The main belt of the Rocky Mountains along with the parallel Columbia Mountains and Coast Ranges of mountains and islands continue through British Columbia and Vancouver Island. In the United States, the Cordillera branches include the Rockies, the Sierra Nevada, the Cascades, and various small Pacific coastal ranges. In Mexico, the Cordillera continues through the Sierra Madre Occidental and Sierra Madre Oriental, as well as the backbone mountains of the Baja California peninsula.

The Cordillera carries on through the mountain ranges of Central America in Guatemala, Honduras, Nicaragua, Costa Rica, and Panama, and becomes the Andes Mountains of South America.

=== South America and Antarctica ===
The Cordillera, having extended through Central America, continues through South America and even to the Antarctic. In South America, the Cordillera is known as the Andes Mountains. The Andes, with their parallel chains and the island chains off the coast of Chile, extend through Colombia, Venezuela, Ecuador, Peru, Bolivia, Argentina, and Chile to the southernmost tip of South America at Tierra del Fuego. The Cordillera continues along the Scotia Arc before reaching the mountains of the Antarctic Peninsula.
