= 1982 London-Paris ultralight race =

Light aircraft event over English channel

The 1982 London-Paris ultralight race was a competition for ultralight aircraft and microlight aircraft to fly between London, England and Paris, France, across the English Channel. It was the pivotal event in the European ultralight/microlight aircraft movement that brought ultralight/microlight aviation in Europe into serious public recognition.

== History and development ==
=== Prehistory ===
In 1909, a competition for the first airplane to cross the English Channel resulted in victory for Louis Bleriot in his small Bleriot XI monoplane, flying from the French coast to the English coast - one of the most historic flights in aviation history (along with 1903 "first flight" of the Wright Brothers, and the 1927 transatlantic flight of Charles Lindbergh), and a pivotal event for the early development of airplanes.

=== Development ===
In 1982, during the rise of the ultralight airplane movement, a race was held to repeat the event - though going the opposite direction, and farther: flying from London, England to Paris, France - crossing the English Channel in the process.

The race was organized by New York City-based Fenwick Aviation (which planned a similar event for the autumn of 1983, between New York and Washington, D.C.).

Besides speed, the rules of the race were structured to reward precise navigation and landing, and minimal fuel consumption.

== Event and outcomes ==
=== Race ===
There were 76 entrants (68 of whom departed from Biggin Hill Aerodrome, near London. At Lydd, England, near the Channel, 66 landed for refueling. Of those, 64 departed Lydd. Finally, 61 landed at Le Toquet, and 59 flew all the way to Pontoise, a few miles from the race end in downtown Paris.

Nearly all of the pilots had never flown over the Channel before. However, despite the risk of overwater flights in early ultralights, none of the aircraft fell into the sea during the Channel crossing, and there were no injuries.

=== Victors ===
- Three-axis-control aircraft: Jacques Antoine Breuvart (Vector 610)
- Weight-shift-control aircraft: Francois Thovex (Daniss Sabre 23)

=== Other notables ===
Nine Huntair Pathfinder I airplanes participated in the 1982 London-Paris. All of them finished, seven of them finishing in the first ten places. Further, a Pathfinder (pilot: Gerry Breen) was joint winner of the speed award.

A small number of Butterfly II motorized ultralight gliders, built by SABENA, and sponsored by R.T.B.F. (Belgian national radio & television), participated in the race. RTBF reporter René Thierry piloted the aircraft to second place in its category.

=== Impact ===
The event generated intense media interest, initially portraying the flight as a replay of the comic movie Those Magnificent Men in Their Flying Machines, but gradually responding to the general success and safety of the flights. Industry historians note it as the point at which Europe's ultralight/microlight movement gained substantial respect and attention.
