= Acapulco Chair =

Mexican chair design

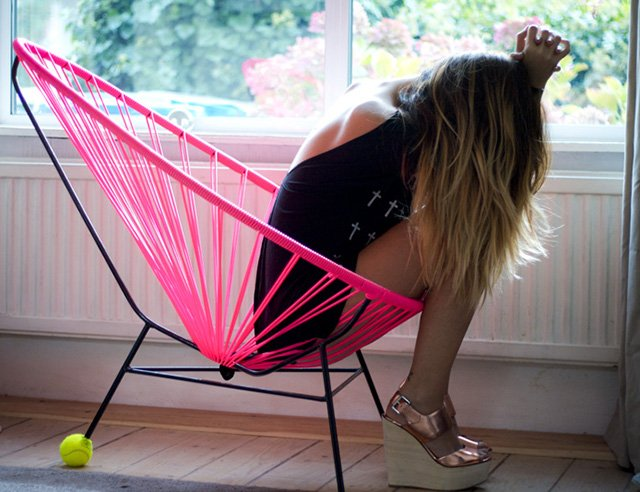
Acapulco Chair, Mexican pink colour

The Acapulco Chair is a chair design popularized in the coastal town of Acapulco, Mexico in the 1950s. Although various versions attribute its creation to figures such as Don José Cortés and J. Amador Saldívar García, there is no official documentation that confirms with certainty who its original inventor was.

At the end of the decade, the Pacifico Acapulco Resort incorporated the chair into its furniture and it was from then on that it would begin to become popular, until it became an icon of Mexican design, as it is recognized today.

This design does not have copyright, since its inventor is unknown.

There is no official manufacturer nor original plans. Thanks to this, many versions have been derived from the Acapulco chair (armchairs, rocking chairs, etc.).

The Acapulco Chair has been exhibited numerous times in museums : Museum of Modern Art in New York, The Metropolitan Gallery in Japan and Centre Pompidou in Paris.

== Gallery ==
Silla Acapulco en el mundo

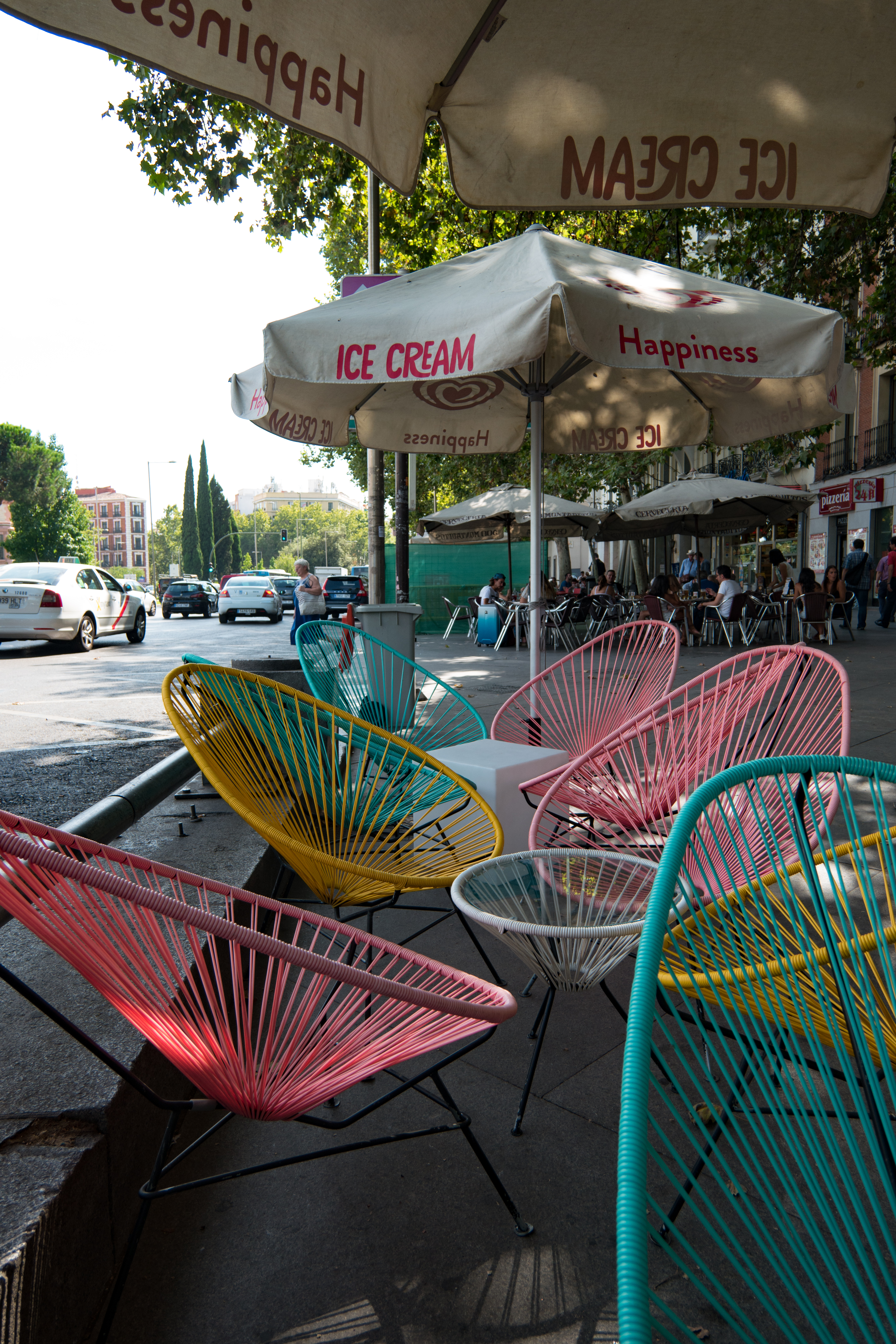
Madrid, Spain

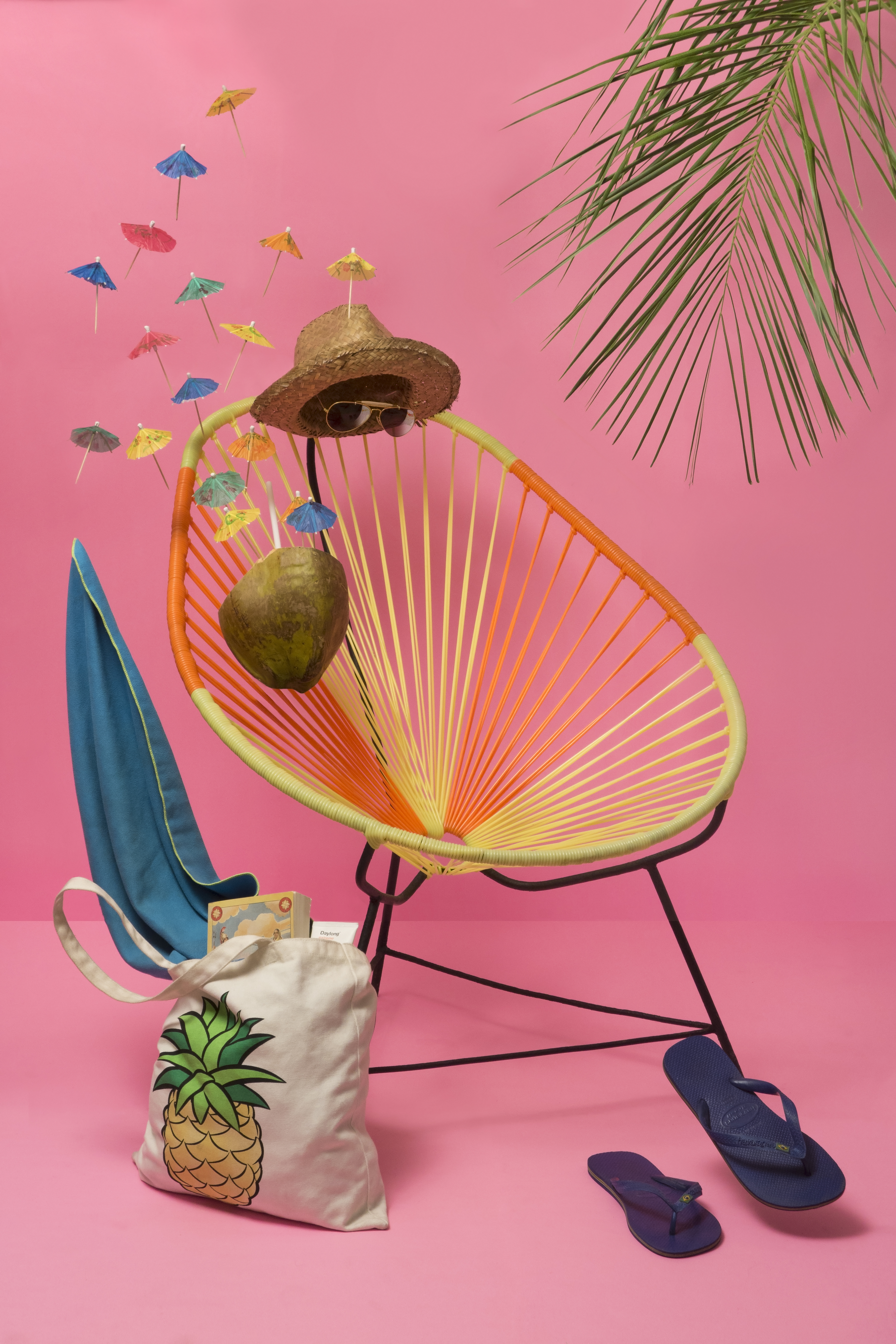
Vacational scene

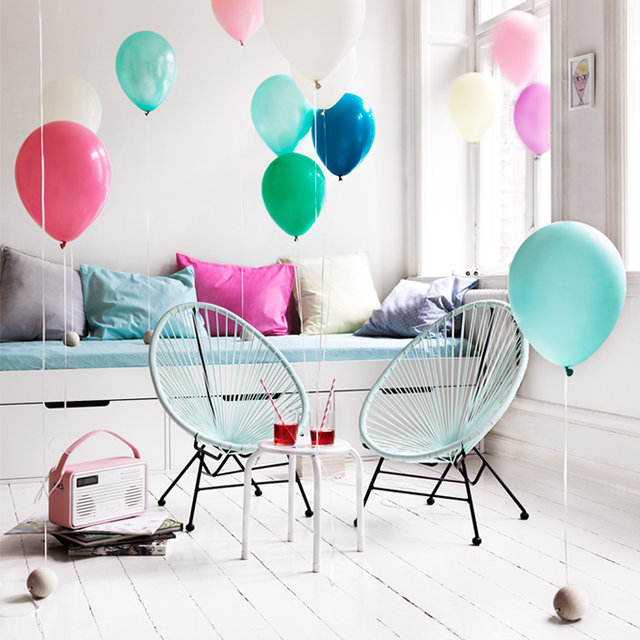
Kid chairs

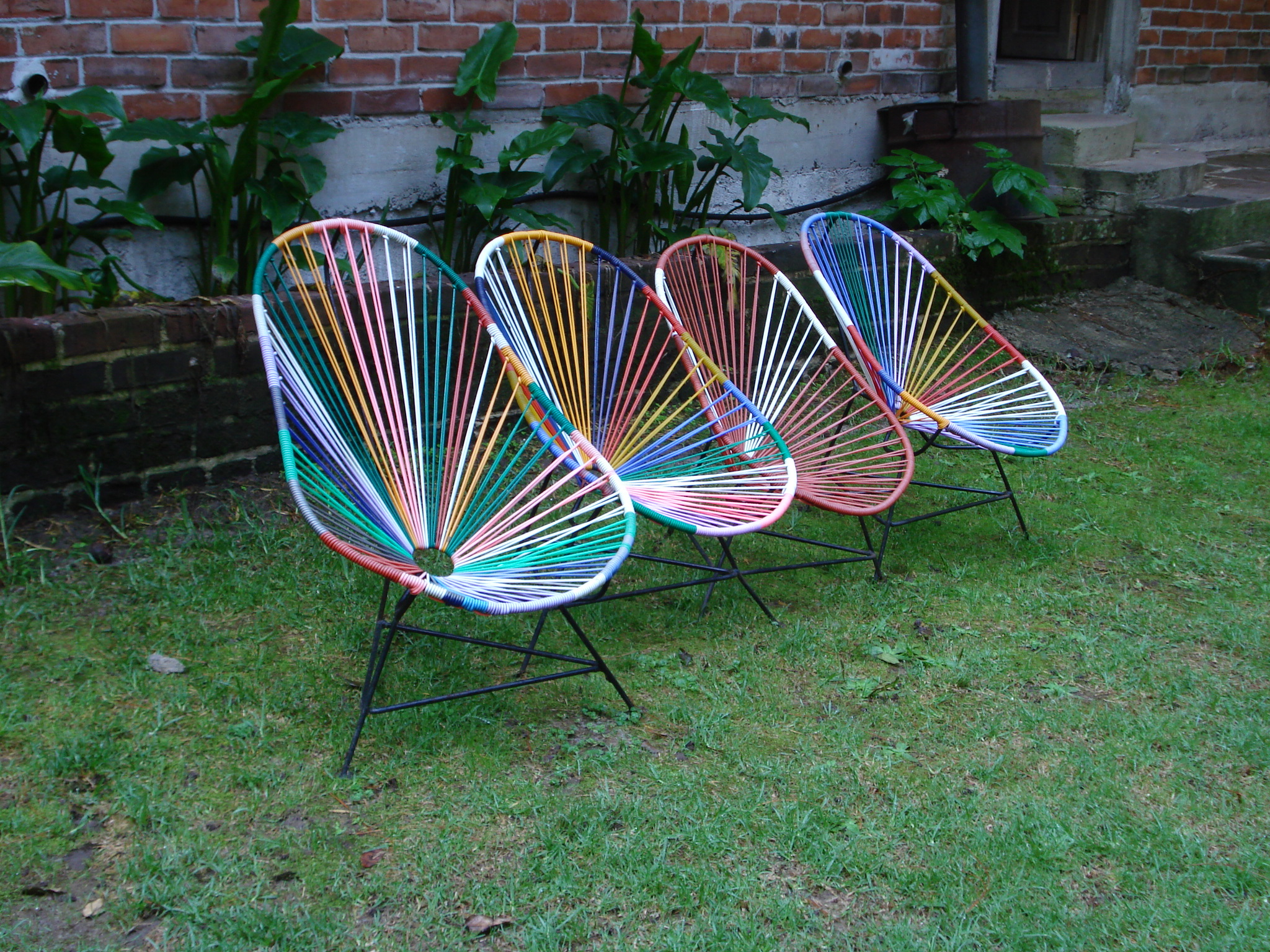
Chairs in Netherlands
