= Mexican pink =

Color

Color coordinates
- Hex triplet: #E4007C
- sRGB^{B} (r, g, b): (228, 0, 124)
- HSV (h, s, v): (327°, 100%, 89%)
- CIELCh_{uv} (L, C, h): (49, 124, 352°)
- ISCC–NBS descriptor: Vivid purplish red
- B: Normalized to [0–255] (byte)

Mexican Pink
#E4007C

Mexican pink (Spanish: rosa mexicano) is a purplish pink tone of the color rose, vivid and saturated, similar to the colors called fuchsia or magenta. It has been compared with the color of the bracts of ornamental climbing plant called bougainvillea, that is, Trinity and Santa Rita bougainvillea. Its origin is that this color is used in traditional clothing such as serapes and is used in the craft art and fine art of traditional Mexican culture.

This bright vivid tone of hot pink is widely seen in Mexican culture today, although the dictionary of the Spanish Royal Academy does not register the name as yet. In Mexico it is considered an element of national identity and a symbol of Mexican charisma.

== History ==
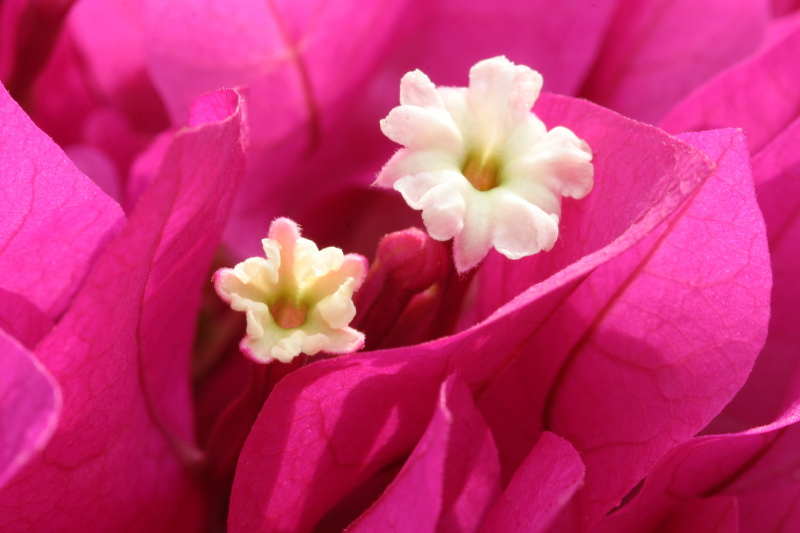
Bracts and Flowers of Bougainvillea sp.

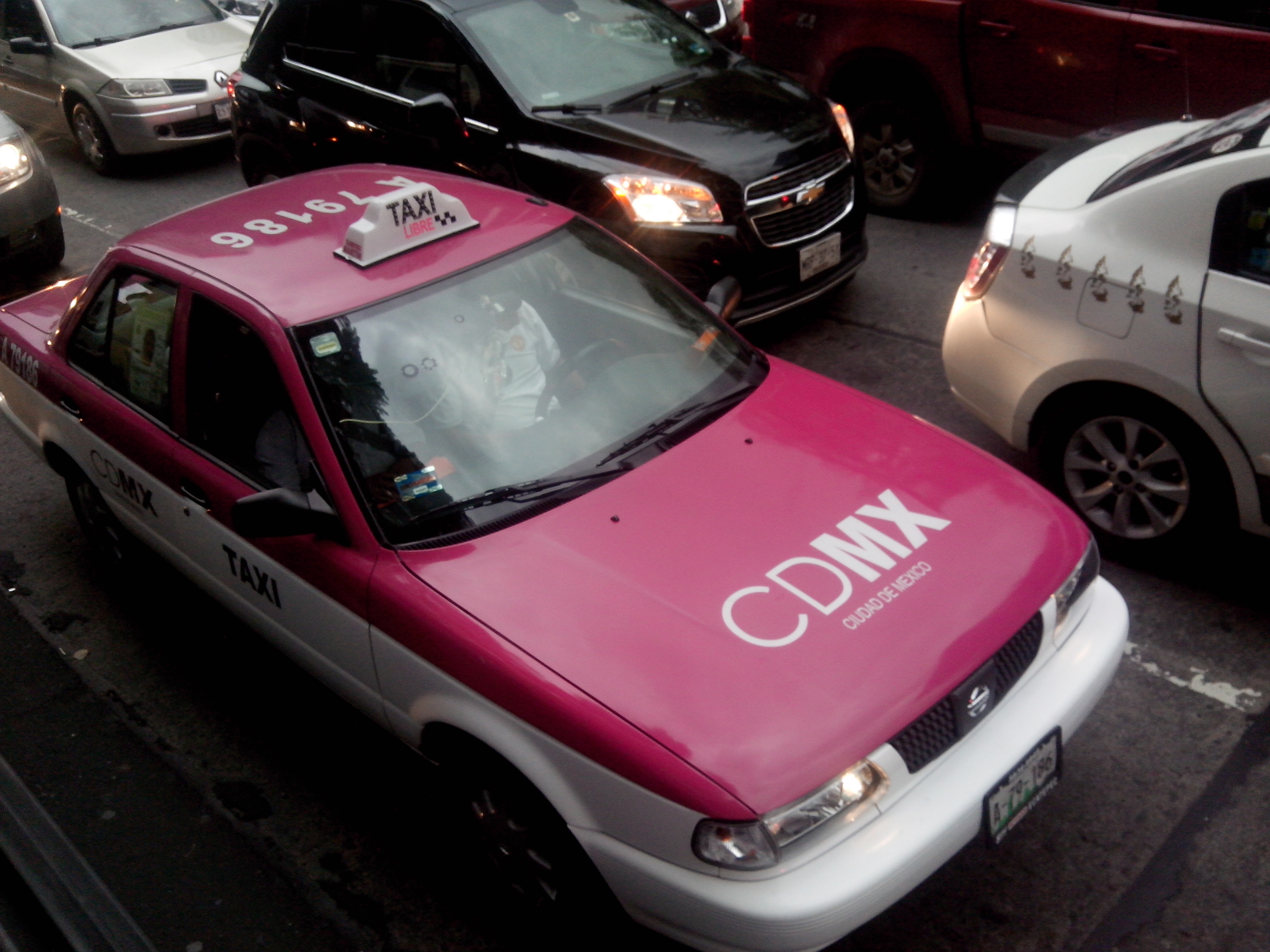
Taxi in Mexico City with the Mexican pink and white design in use since 2014

Mexican pink became known as such through the efforts of the journalist, painter, cartoonist and fashion designer Ramón Valdiosera. In the mid-1940s, Valdiosera made a long research trip across Mexico where he made contact with different ethnic groups and collected suits and dresses typical of different regions. Interested in traditional Mexican clothing being adapted to contemporary fashion, on his return to Mexico City he set up a sewing workshop and there devoted himself to move the fabrics, colors and traditional styles to sophisticated forms of fashion at that time.

The color frequently appears in the work of Luis Barragan, one of Mexico's best-known architects. It was also used in the 2023 movie Barbie.
