= Bungee cord =

Elastic cord used for fastening or shock absorption

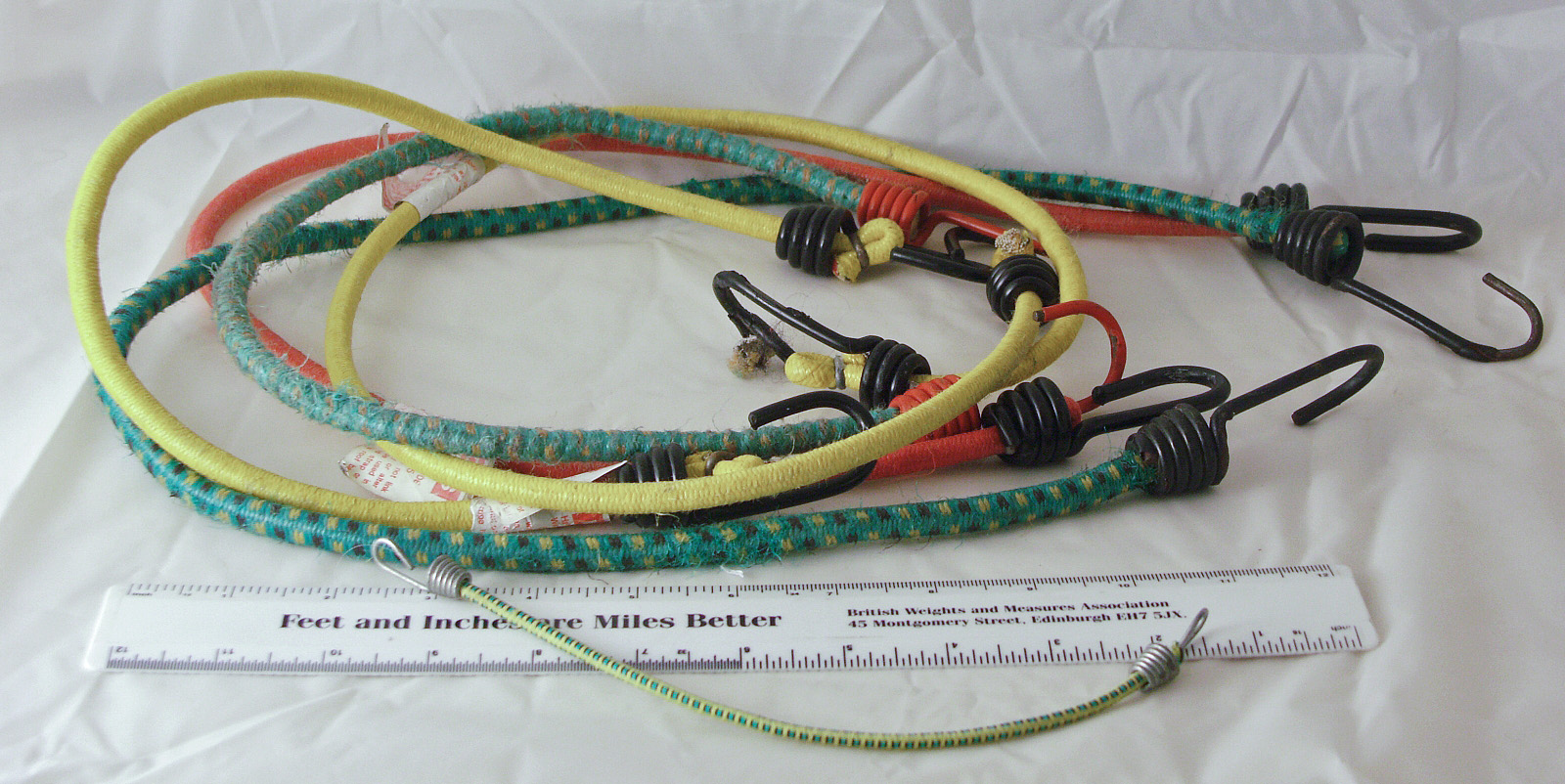
Bungee cords with metal hooks

A bungee cord (also spelled bungie or bungy; sometimes called a shock cord or occy strap) is a stretchable cord made of one or more rubber strands inside a woven cotton or polypropylene cover. When the cord is stretched, the cover tightens around the core, allowing it to extend and return to its original length. Some versions, such as those used in bungee jumping, are made entirely of elastic strands. Bungee cords are often used to fasten or secure objects and to absorb shock.

== Uses ==
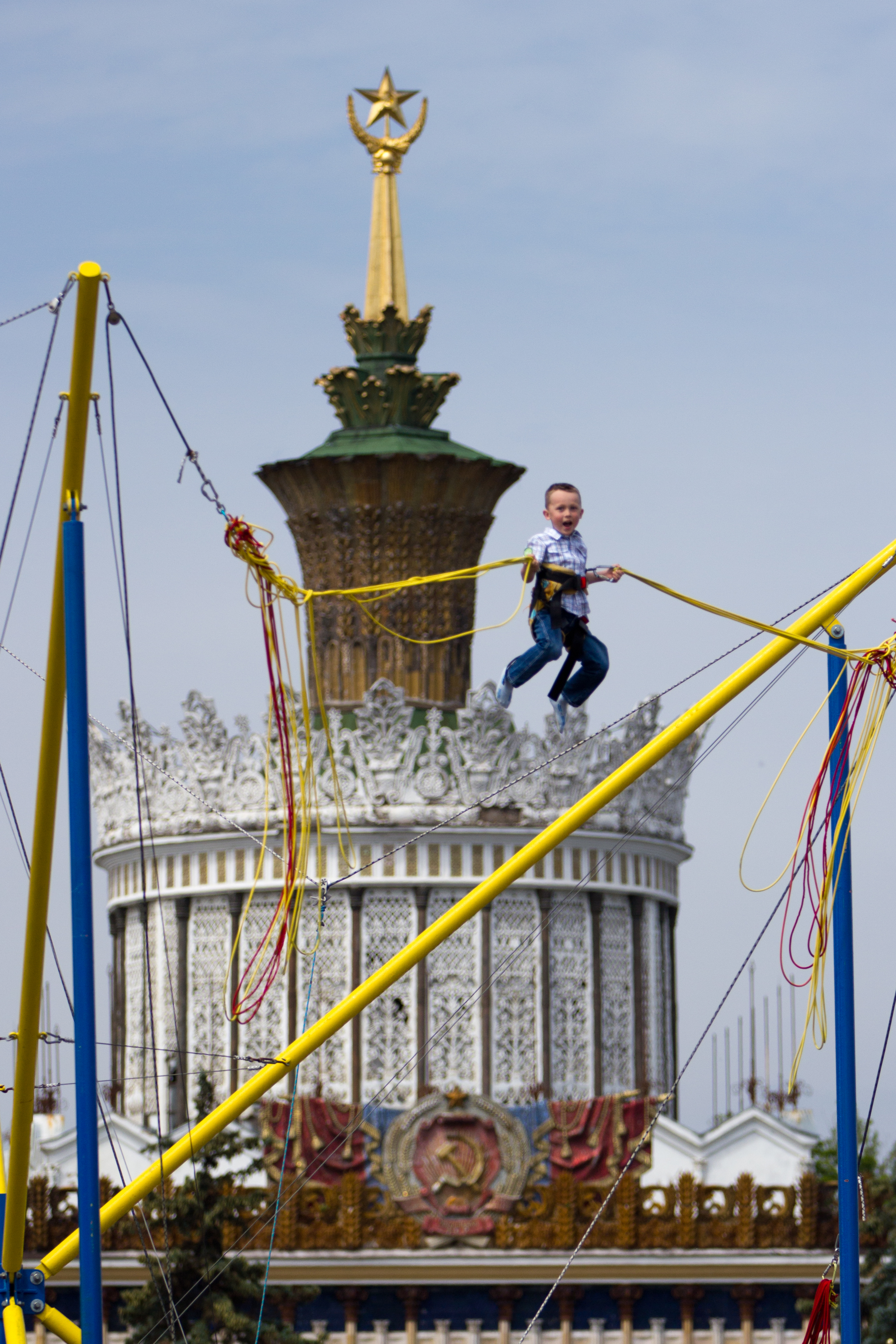
A child on a bungee cord ride in Moscow, Russia

Early aircraft used bungee cords for light suspension in landing gear, and some small homebuilt planes still use them where low weight is important. They were also once used in parachuting to help open older parachute containers after the ripcord was pulled.

Today, bungee cords are sold as everyday fastening tools. In Australia, they are called octopus straps or occy straps. These may be single cords or several hooked cords joined by a ring to secure items such as luggage on a car roof rack or on the bed of a pickup truck. Similar cords are made as nets for securing irregular loads.

Bungee cords are also used in furniture design, such as bungee chairs, and in other applications that need flexible tension.

== Safety ==
Bungee cords can cause serious eye or facial injuries if they snap back. Medical studies warn of the risk of vision loss and advise using safer fasteners when possible.

== Etymology ==
The origin of the word "bungee" is uncertain. The Oxford English Dictionary records its first use in 1938 for launching gliders with an elastic cord.
