= Freebird (disambiguation) =

"Freebird", or "Free Bird", is a 1974 song by Lynyrd Skynyrd.

Freebird may also refer to:

- Freebird (2008 film), a British comedy film by Jon Ivay
- Freebird (2021 film), a Canadian 2D animated short film
- Freebird, 1999 play by Jon Ivay, the source for the film
- Free Bird Innovations, an American aircraft manufacturer
  - Freebird I, an American single-seat kit aircraft
  - Freebird II, an American two-seat kit aircraft
- Freebird Airlines, Turkish holiday charter airline
- Freebird Records, Dutch independent record label
- Dorna Free Bird, an Iranian light-sport aircraft

== See also ==
- Freebirds (disambiguation)
- Free as a Bird (disambiguation)
- Vogelfrei (disambiguation)
