= Litesport =

Litesport may refer to:

- Freebird LiteSport II, an American ultralight aircraft design
- Freebird LiteSport Ultra, an American ultralight aircraft design
- Moyes Litesport, an Australian hang glider design
