= Summit Steel Breeze =

American powered parachute

Steel Breeze

General information
- Type: Powered parachute
- National origin: United States
- Manufacturer: Summit Aerosports
- Status: In production

The Summit Steel Breeze is an American powered parachute, designed and produced by Summit Aerosports of Yale, Michigan. The aircraft is supplied as a kit for amateur construction or as a complete ready-to-fly aircraft.

== Design and development ==
The Steel Breeze is intended as a light-sport aircraft compliant design. It features a parachute-style high-wing, two seats in tandem accommodation, tricycle landing gear and a single engine in pusher configuration. Engines available include the 50 hp (37 kW) Rotax 503, the 64 hp (48 kW) liquid-cooled Rotax 582, the 70 hp (52 kW) Hirth 3503 two-strokes and the four-stroke 60 hp (45 kW) HKS 700E.

The Steel Breeze's airframe is built from 1.5 in (38 mm) TIG-welded, powder coated 4130 steel tubing. The standard rectangular Mustang S-500 canopy has an area of 500 sq ft (46 m^{2}) and is attached at four points to increase stability. The Mustang S-500 allows a gross weight of 850 lb (386 kg). Optional canopies include the rectangular Mustang S-550 which allows a gross weight of 950 lb (431 kg) and the elliptical Thunderbolt E-340 which allows a gross weight of 900 lb (408 kg). In-flight steering is accomplished via foot pedals that actuate the canopy brakes, creating roll and yaw. On the ground the aircraft has nosewheel steering controlled by a butterfly steering wheel and the main landing gear incorporates bungee suspension.

As of August 2012, the design does not appear on the Federal Aviation Administration's list of approved special light-sport aircraft.

== Specifications (Steel Breeze) ==
Data from Kitplanes and Summit Aerosports

General characteristics

- Crew: one
- Capacity: one passenger
- Length: 10 ft 3 in (3.12 m)
- Wing area: 500 sq ft (46 m^{2})
- Empty weight: 323 lb (147 kg)
- Gross weight: 850 lb (386 kg) with Mustang S-500 wing
- Fuel capacity: 14 U.S. gallons (53 L; 12 imp gal)
- Powerplant: 1 × Rotax 503 twin cylinder, two-stroke, air-cooled aircraft engine, 50 hp (37 kW)
- Propellers: 3-bladed GSC Systems ground adjustable Tech 3 propeller, 5 ft 4 in (1.63 m) diameter

Performance

- Cruise speed: 25 mph (40 km/h, 22 kn)
- Maximum glide ratio: 4:1
- Rate of climb: 400 ft/min (2.0 m/s)
- Wing loading: 1.7 lb/sq ft (8.3 kg/m^{2})
