= Wladimir Talanczuk =

Ukrainian- born aeronautical engineer

- Born: Ukraine, USSR
- Education: Institute for Aviation Specialists, Poland
- Engineering career
- Institutions: AeroKlub Wrocław; Birdman Enterprises
- Projects: Birdman WT-11 Chinook
- Significant advance: Ultralight aircraft Hang gliders

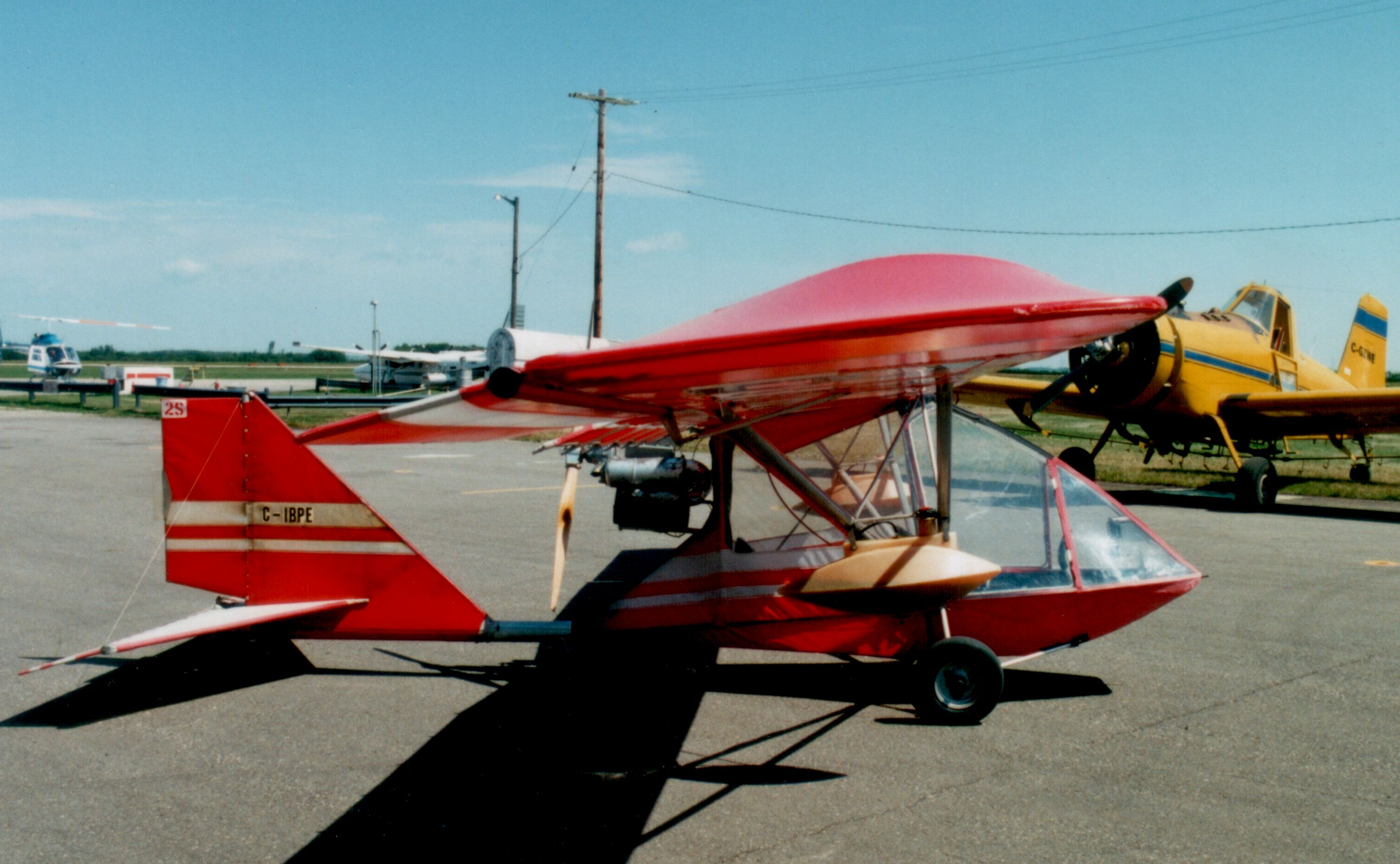
Birdman Chinook 2S

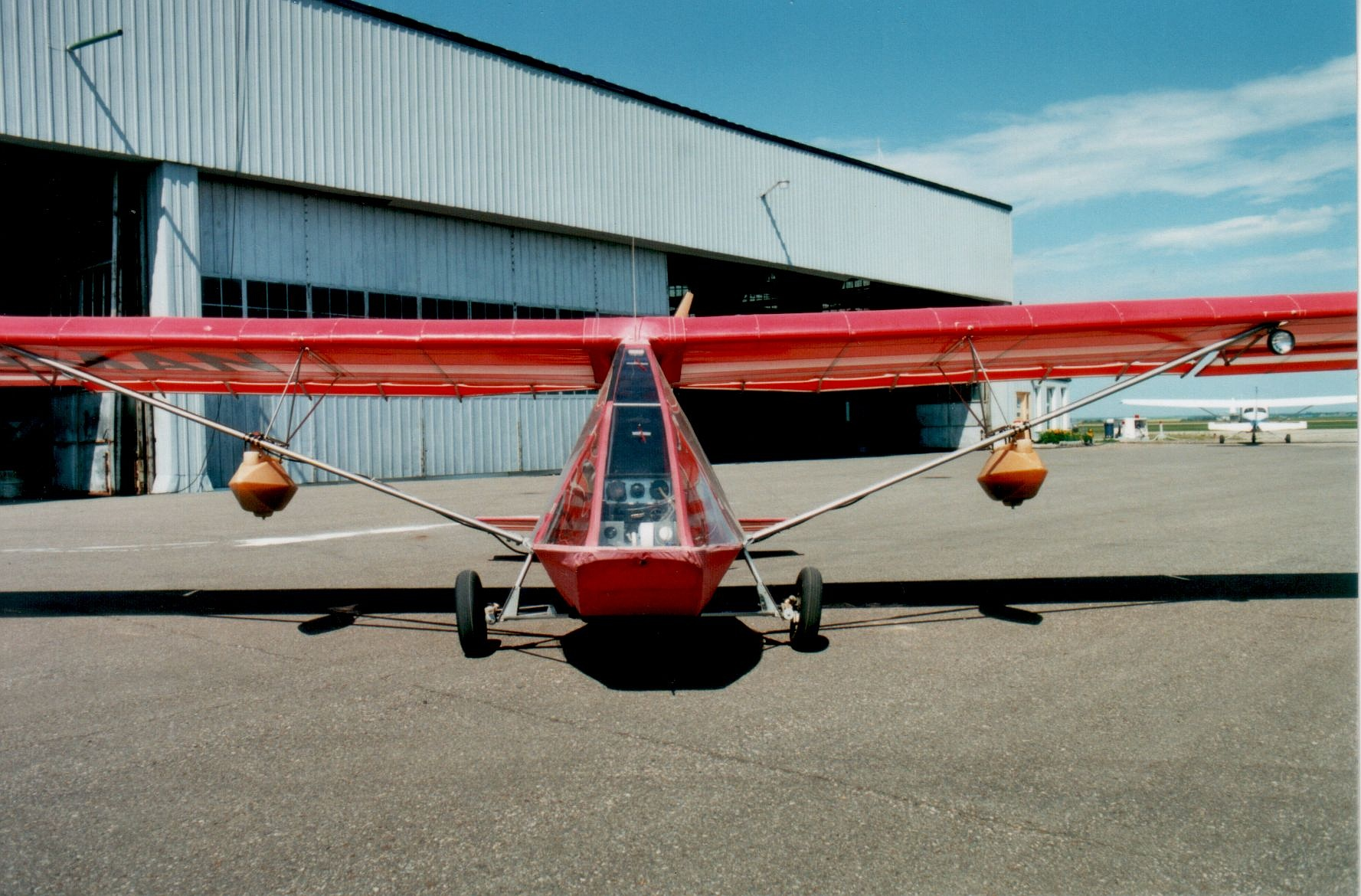
Birdman Chinook 2S

Wladimir Talanczuk (also known by his anglicized name Vladimir Talanczuk) is a Ukrainian- born aeronautical engineer known for his hang glider and ultralight aircraft designs.

== Career ==
Talanczuk graduated from the Polish Institute for Aviation Specialists in 1970 as an aeronautical engineer and immediately embarked upon a career as a designer of hang gliders and light aircraft. He worked with Tadensca Dobczynski, the Polish amateur aircraft builder, assisting in the design and construction of more than thirty Dobczynski designs.

Talanczuk qualified as a light aircraft pilot, logging 1200 hours of flight time. In 1972 he began to seriously devote his time to hang gliding. While working for the AeroKlub Wrocław he designed his Mars series of hang gliders, including the WT-6 Mars-S, WT-7 Mars-2S and WT-8 Mars-Agat. Throughout 1979 he was a member of the Polish National Hang Gliding Team and competed in the World Hang Gliding Championships at Grenoble, France, flying a Mars hang glider of his own design. The hang glider he flew at that event was at that time the largest wingspan hang glider flown.

Talanczuk also served as a consultant to the Polish National Aero Club in the fields of accident investigation and analysis. He designed several light aircraft and completed a single-seat gyroplane during his time in Poland.

He emigrated to Canada in 1981 and began working for hang glider and ultralight aircraft manufacturer Birdman Enterprises, of Edmonton, Alberta shortly after his arrival, filling the position of Chief Engineer and Designer.

Talanczuk's first project at Birdman was the design of a new ultralight aircraft to replace the Birdman Atlas in production. The company's stated design goals for the aircraft were: good flying characteristics, simplicity of construction and maximization of aesthetics.

Designer Talanczuk stated his own additional project intentions:

An Ultralight is not only a fun machine, it should also be usable for utility purposes -- training, fishing trips, crop-spraying and even for freight carrying. But an Ultralight should be affordable by many people, so it shouldn't become expensive. The wings, for example, can't be complicated. They should be easy to build and fix.

Talanczuk chose an airfoil that was created by Dr Dave Marsden at the University of Alberta, the UA 80/1. The aircraft was his eleventh design and was designated the WT-11 Chinook, although in 1987 the company redesignated it 1S (for 1 seat) to conform to their own nomenclature.

Birdman President Terry Jones assessed the results of the WT-11 design in a press release, saying:

To judge from the final product, Talanczuk has achieved his aims in the Birdman WT 11 CHINOOK. It is a good-looking and compact machine that exhibits gentle but crisp flying characteristics; is strong yet simple in construction and offer a variety of applications from weekend flying to bushplane practicality. With a low initial purchase price and excellent fuel economy, the machine is also inexpensive to own and operate. In all, it's a perfect little aviation package.

The WT-11 received both critical acclaim and commercial success. The single seat WT-11 was followed by Talanczuk's two-seat trainer version which Birdman designated as the Chinook 2S (2 seater). A total of over 700 WT-11s and 2S Chinooks were completed before Birdman Enterprises went out of business in late 1987.

Talanczuk's Chinook design was resurrected in 1989, when it was redesigned by Aircraft Sales and Parts President Brent Holomis as the ASAP Chinook 2 Plus, an Advanced Ultralight Aeroplane that remains in production today.

== Aircraft ==
Summary of aircraft designed by Wladimir Talanczuk
Model name	First flight	Number built	Type
WT-1			
WT-2			
WT-3			
WT-4			
WT-5			
WT-6 Mars-S			Single-place hang glider
WT-7 Mars-2S			Single-place hang glider
WT-8 Mars-Agat		8 built by 1979	Single-place hang glider
WT-9			
WT-10			
Chinook WT-11	1982	700 WT-11 and 2S	Single-place ultralight aircraft
Chinook 2S	1984	700 WT-11 and 2S	Two-place ultralight aircraft
