= Birdman Project 102 =

Canadian single-seat motor glider, 1982

Project 102

General information
- Type: Ultralight motor glider
- National origin: Canada
- Manufacturer: Birdman Enterprises
- Designer: Dr David Marsden
- Status: Experimental
- Number built: 1

History
- First flight: 1982

The Birdman Project 102, also known as Windsoar, was an experimental high wing, single engine, pod-and-boom, conventional landing gear-equipped, ultralight motor glider originally intended for production by Birdman Enterprises.

== Development ==
Project 102 was intended to result in a production lightweight motor glider and was designed in 1981 by David Marsden from the University of Alberta with assistance from Birdman Enterprises' designer Vladimir Talanczuk. The production aircraft was tentatively named the Birdman Windsoar.

The Project 102 aircraft was built from aluminum and foam. The all-metal wing was cantilever, stressed to +6/-6 g and featured full-span reflexing ailerons that could be raised to increase cruise performance, as well as winglets. The wing centre was covered with aircraft fabric. The cockpit included a windshield, with the sides left open, although a full enclosure was intended to be optional. The conventional low tail was mounted on a long aluminum tail boom.

The single engine was in pusher configuration and was planned for 10 to 25 hp (7 to 19 kW).

The Windsoar was planned to be delivered to buyers as an assembly kit that would take about 100–200 hours to complete. The major structural assembly would be completed at the factory and the builder would have been required to complete the bolting and riveting, as well as installing the fabric.

Project 102 was supposed to fly in the summer of 1982, with kit production commencing the following autumn and winter and customer deliveries in the spring of 1983. The aircraft never entered production.

== Specifications (Project 102) ==
General characteristics

- Crew: one
- Length: 19 ft 6 in (5.94 m)
- Wingspan: 37 ft 6 in (11.43 m)
- Empty weight: 200 lb (91 kg)
- Powerplant: 1 × two stroke , 10 hp (7.5 kW) to 25 hp (19 kW)

Performance

- Maximum speed: 90 mph (140 km/h, 78 kn)
- Stall speed: 20 mph (32 km/h, 17 kn)
- g limits: +6/-6
