= Paup P-Craft =

American ultralight aircraft

P-Craft

General information
- Type: Ultralight aircraft
- National origin: United States
- Manufacturer: Paup Aircraft
- Designer: D. Paup
- Status: Production completed

History
- Introduction date: 1982

The Paup P-Craft is an American ultralight aircraft that was designed by D. Paup and produced by Paup Aircraft, introduced in 1982. The aircraft was supplied as a kit for amateur construction.

== Design and development ==
The P-Craft was designed to comply with the US FAR 103 Ultralight Vehicles rules, including the category's maximum empty weight of 254 lb (115 kg). The aircraft has a standard empty weight of 165 lb (75 kg). It features a strut-braced high-wing, a single-seat, open cockpit, conventional landing gear and a single engine in pusher configuration.

The aircraft is made from aluminum tubing, with the aft fuselage welded steel tubing. Its tapered 32.5 ft (9.9 m) span wing has no wing-mounted control surfaces. The wing is covered in doped aircraft fabric. Pitch is controlled conventionally, while yaw is controlled by the rudder, actuated by sideways movement of the control stick. The high degree of wing dihedral produces rolling motion from yaw coupling. The landing gear is bungee-suspended and the tailwheel is steerable. The single cylinder, two-stroke Cuyuna 215 20 hp (15 kW) engine is mounted behind the open pilot's seat, with the propeller rotating in between the top and bottom tail structural members.

== Specifications (P-Craft) ==
Data from Cliche and the Virtual Ultralight Museum

General characteristics

- Crew: one
- Wingspan: 32 ft 6 in (9.91 m)
- Wing area: 132 sq ft (12.3 m^{2})
- Empty weight: 165 lb (75 kg)
- Gross weight: 402 lb (182 kg)
- Powerplant: 1 × Cuyuna 215 single cylinder two-stroke engine, 20 hp (15 kW)

Performance

- Cruise speed: 40 mph (64 km/h, 35 kn)
- Stall speed: 22 mph (35 km/h, 19 kn)
- Rate of climb: 300 ft/min (1.5 m/s)
- Wing loading: 3.05 lb/sq ft (14.9 kg/m^{2})
