= Free as a Bird (disambiguation) =

"Free as a Bird" is a 1995 single by the Beatles.

Free as a Bird may also refer to:

- Free as a Bird (album), an album by Supertramp
  - "Free as a Bird" (Supertramp song), the title track from the album
- Vogelfrei, a concept in Germanic law that translates to "free as a bird"
- "Free as a Bird", a song by Emeli Sandé from the album Real Life

== See also ==
- Freebird (disambiguation)
- Vogelfrei (disambiguation)
