= Birdman Enterprises =

Canadian aircraft manufacturer

- Industry: Aerospace
- Founded: 1973
- Defunct: 1987
- Fate: Out of business
- Successor: Aircraft Sales and Parts (ASAP)
- Headquarters: Edmonton, Alberta, Canada
- Key people: Terry Jones, CEO; Graham R. Lee, Production Mgr
- Products: Hang gliders Chinook ultralight
- Subsidiaries: Canadian Ultralight Manufacturing

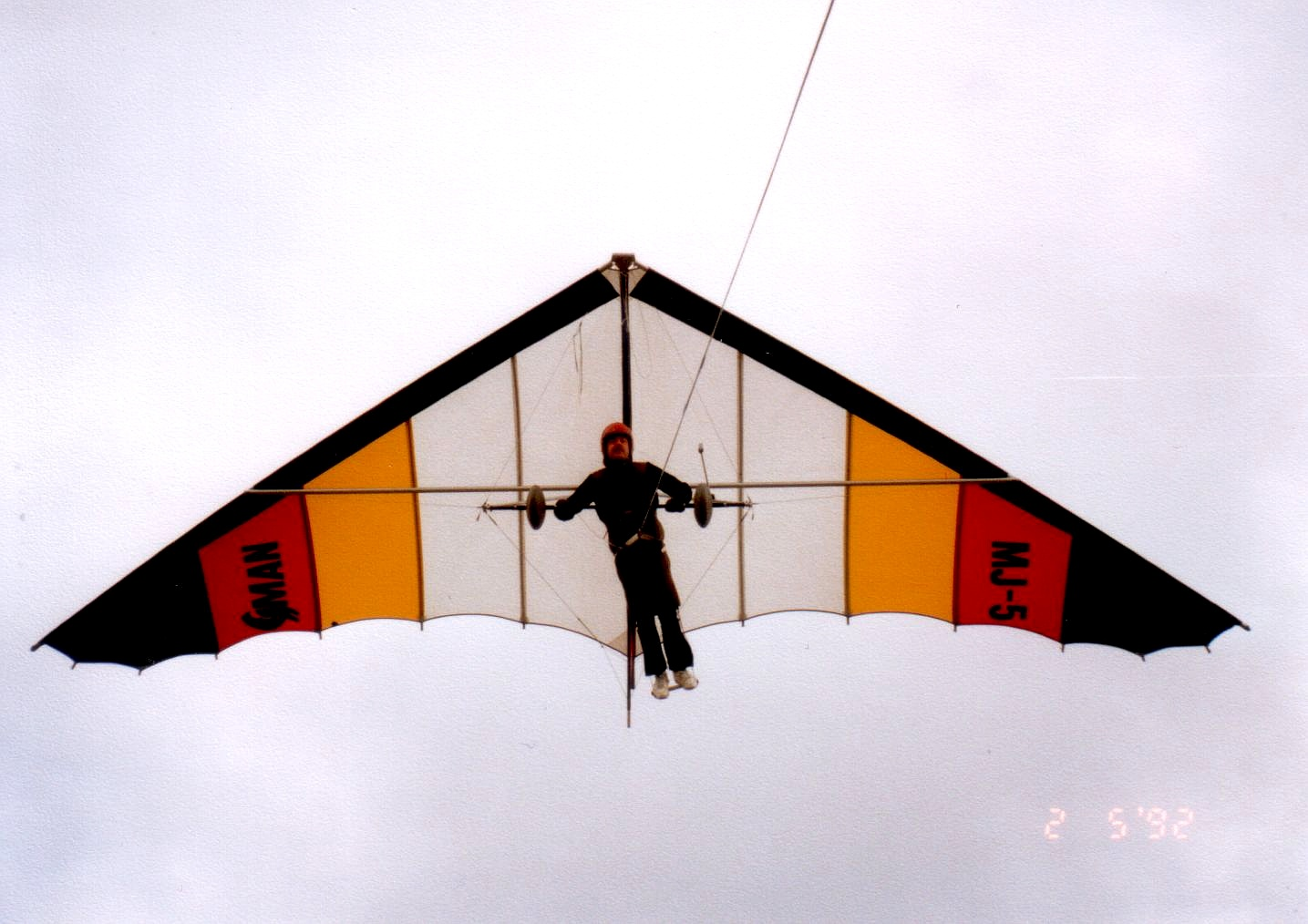
Birdman MJ-5 hang glider

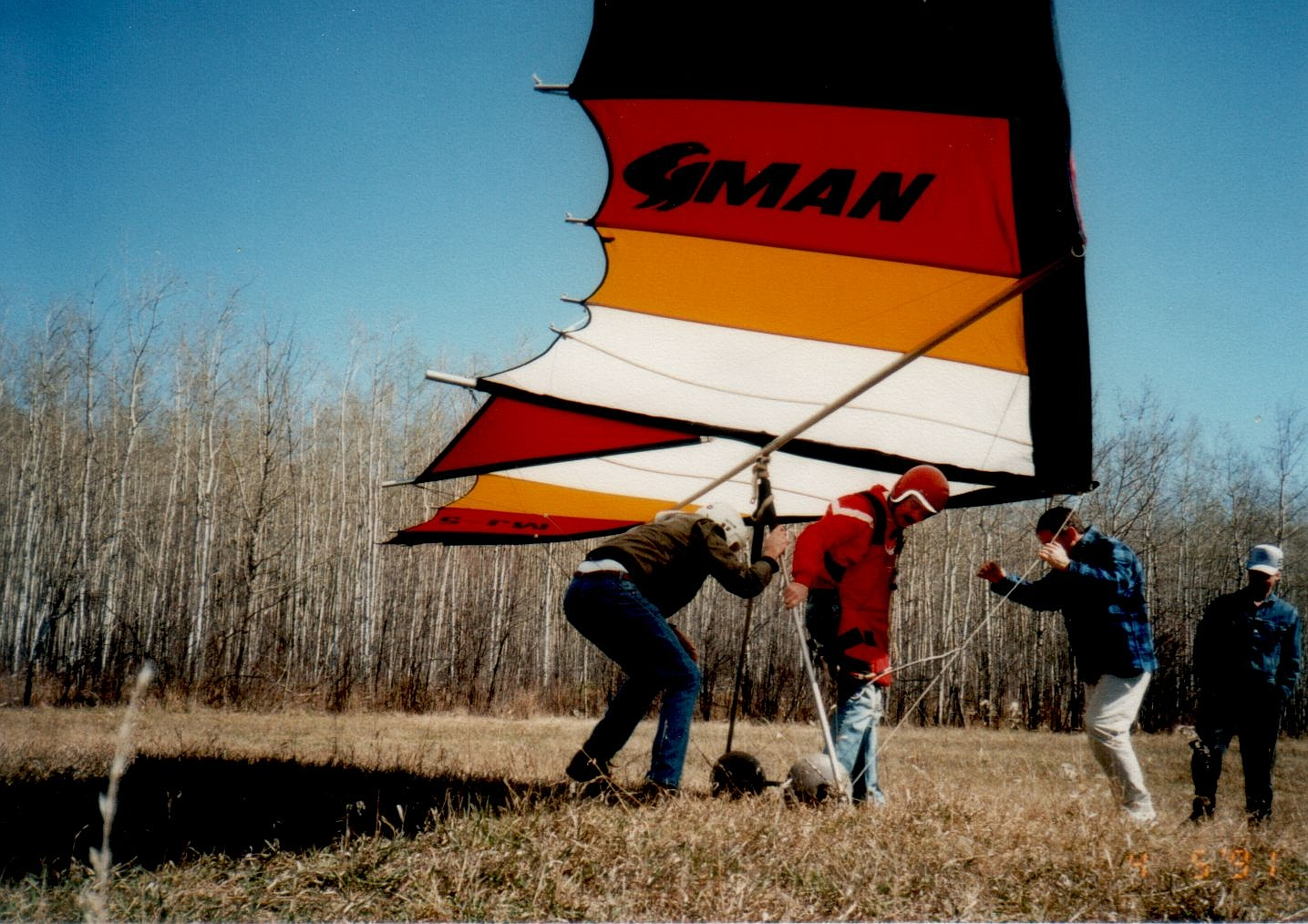
Birdman MJ-5 hang glider

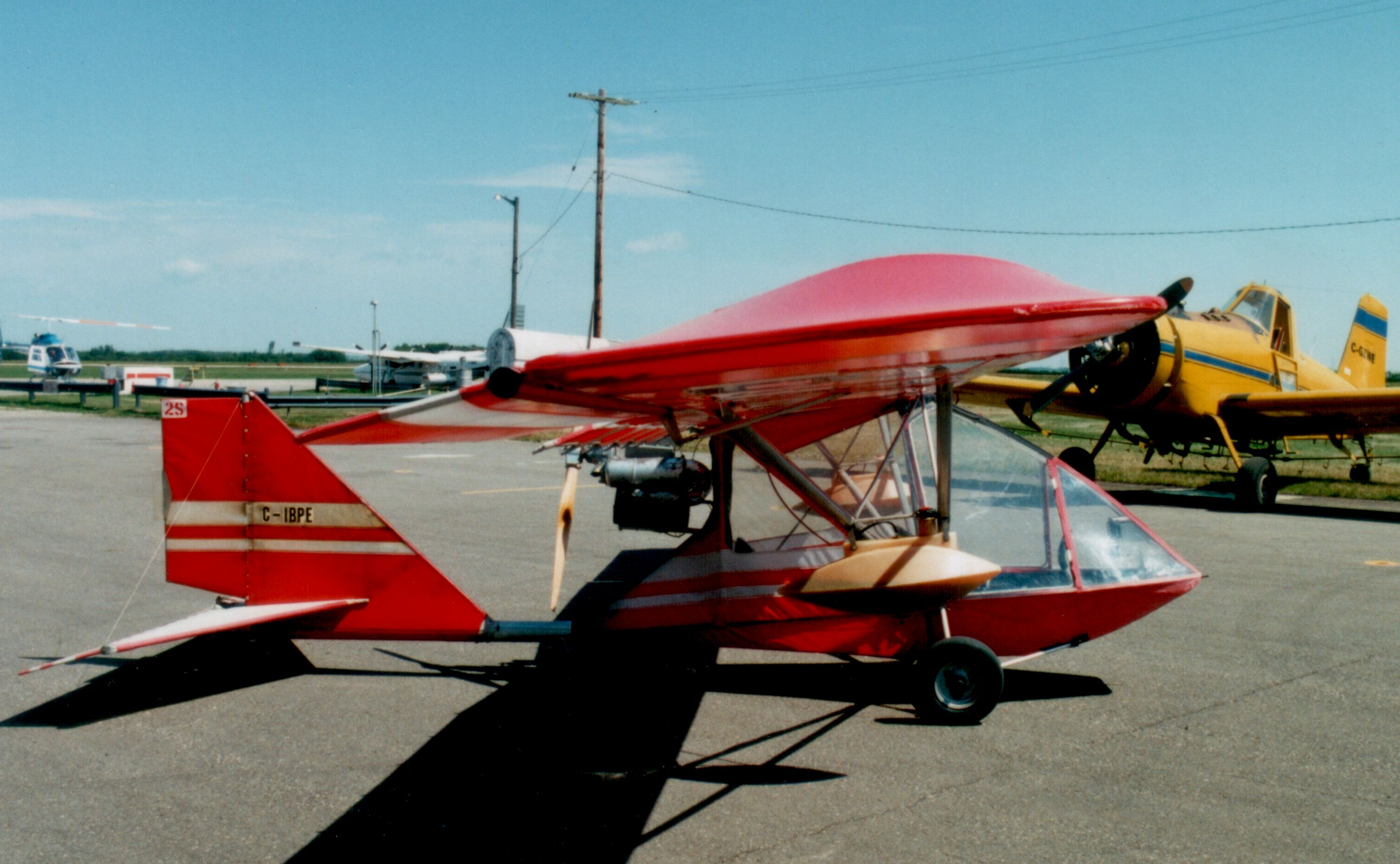
Birdman Chinook 2S

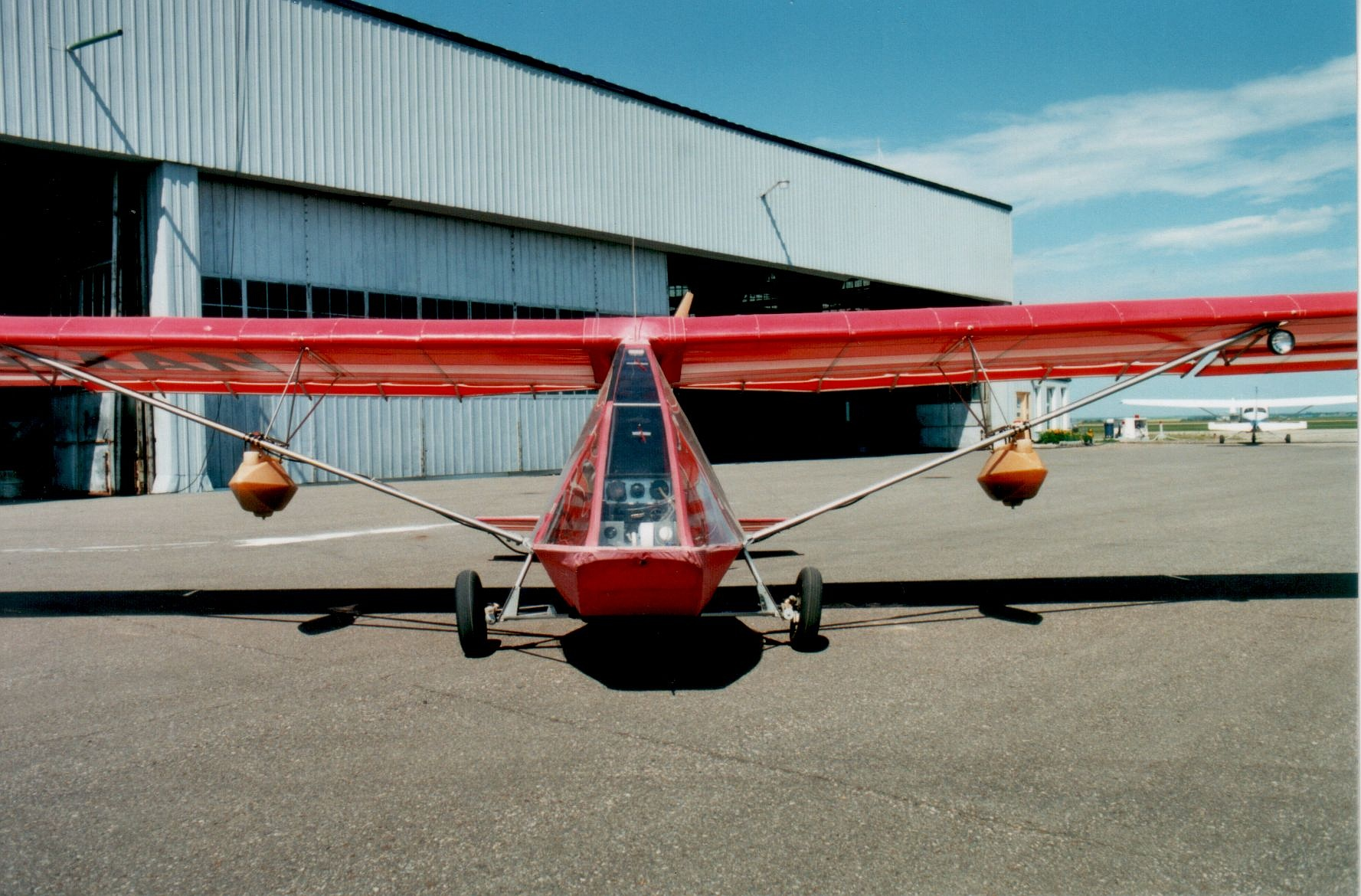
Birdman Chinook 2S

Birdman Enterprises Limited was a Canadian aircraft manufacturer that commenced business in 1973 and became well known for its line of hang gliders and later its ultralight aircraft until its demise in late 1987.

A redesigned version of the company's Chinook ultralight design was later placed back in production by Aircraft Sales and Parts of Vernon, British Columbia in 1989 as a kit aircraft.

== History ==
The founder of Birdman Enterprises, Terry Jones, first learned to fly in 1970 from Bill Moyes, the originator of the modern sport of hang gliding. In 1973 Jones started designing and building his own gliders in Edmonton, Alberta. He named the company after the nickname that he had personally acquired as a hang glider pilot, "Birdman Jones".

The Birdman MJ-4, MJ-5 and MJ-6 were very successful designs and sold in large numbers. Next the company developed a power package for self-launching hang gliders and started marketing it in 1979 as the Altair.

In 1980 the company introduced its first ultralight aircraft design, the Birdman Atlas, which was based on the Eipper Quicksilver. Operational experience resulted in a greatly improved Atlas model for 1981. The redesigned aircraft provided more lift, engine thrust and a better rate of climb. A total of more than 500 were produced.

In 1981, the company hired experienced Ukrainian hang glider designer Vladimir Talanczuk, who had recently immigrated to Canada. He was assigned the task of designing a "clean-sheet" ultralight aircraft for mass-production as a kit. Talanczuk's eleventh design, the WT-11, became the Birdman WT-11 Chinook (later redesignated the Birdman Chinook 1S), first flying on 12 December 1982 and entering production the following year.

As a result of its focus on ultralight aircraft, including a new factory in St. Paul, Alberta that became known as Canadian Ultralight Manufacturing, Birdman ceased production of hang gliders in 1983. With the WT-11 single-seat ultralight in production, Talanczuk produced the design for the planned Chinook two-seat trainer, which was designated as the Chinook 2S (2 seater). The 2S entered production in 1984.

China Daily newspaper carried a story on 9 November 1985 announcing that the government of the People's Republic of China had signed a ten-year contract with Birdman Enterprises to construct 5,000 aircraft in China for sale worldwide. This was announced as part of China's strategy to diversify military production into civil aircraft as part of the nation's modernization program.

Between starting Chinook production in 1983 and going out of business in late 1987, Birdman produced approximately 700 WT-11 and 2S Chinooks.

== Successor ==
In 1988 one of the owners of a Chinook 2S, Brent Holomis, decided to start producing Chinook parts to support the existing fleet of aircraft. Once parts were available from his new company Aircraft Sales and Parts (ASAP), Holomis next embarked on a redesign of the Chinook 2S and by 1989 the ASAP Chinook Plus 2 was available in kit form. The Chinook Plus 2 remains in production.

== Aircraft ==
Summary of aircraft built by Birdman Enterprises
Model name	First flight	Number built	Type
Falcon I & II			hang glider
XC			Single-place hang glider
MJ-4			Single-place hang glider
MJ-5			Single-place hang glider
MJ-6			Single-place hang glider
Altair	1979		Hang glider power package
Atlas	1980	more than 500	Single-place ultralight aircraft
Project 102	1982	1	Single-place ultralight motor glider
Chinook WT-11	1982	700 WT-11 and 2S	Single-place ultralight aircraft
Chinook 2S	1984	700 WT-11 and 2S	Two-place ultralight aircraft
