= Rutan Solitaire =

American motorglider

Solitaire
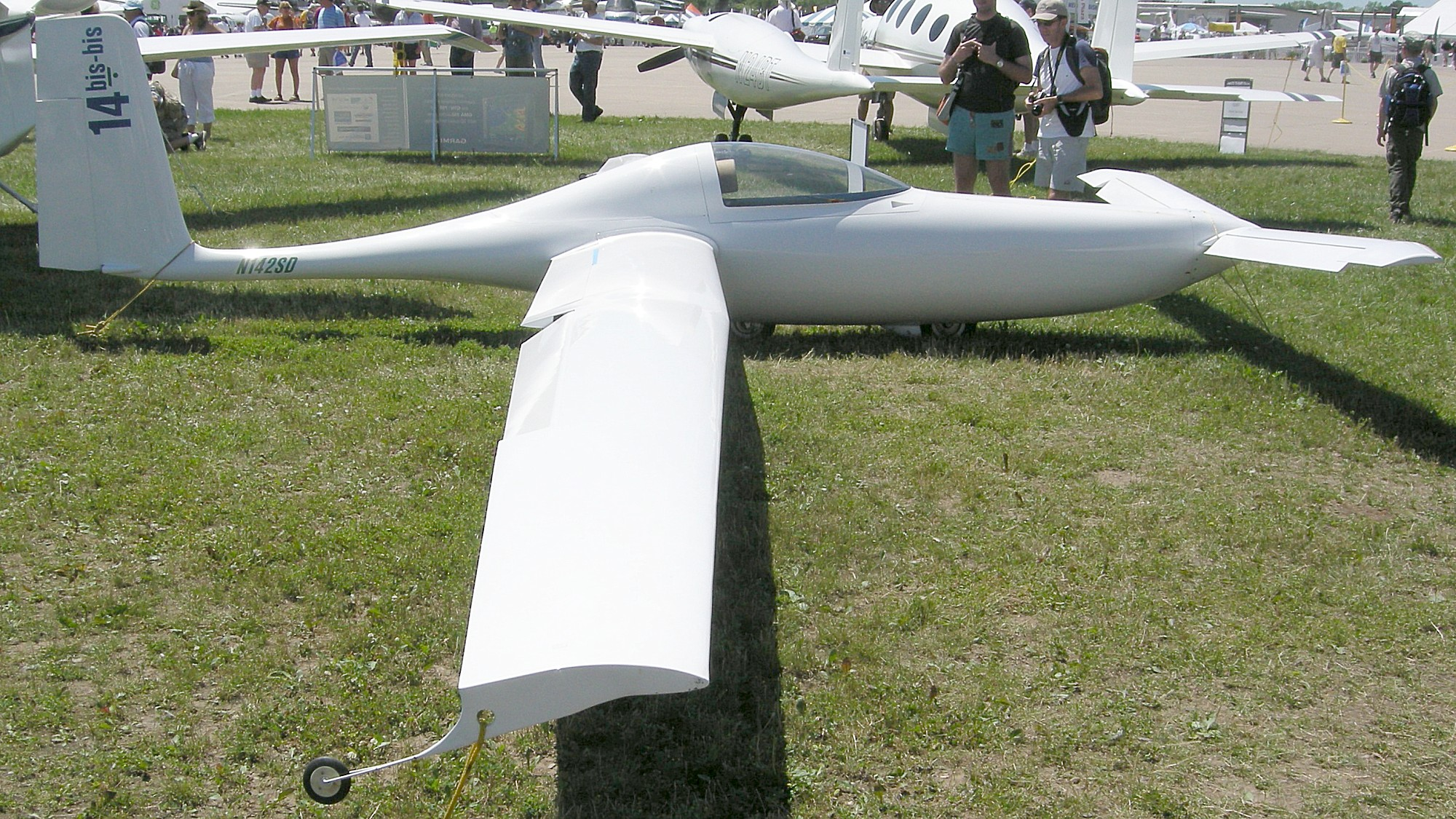

General information
- Type: Kit-built motor glider
- National origin: United States
- Manufacturer: Rutan Aircraft Factory
- Designer: Burt Rutan
- Status: Production completed

History
- Introduction date: 1982
- First flight: 1982

The Rutan Model 77 Solitaire is an American, single seat, canard, mid-wing motor glider that was developed by Burt Rutan in response to the 1982 Sailplane Homebuilders Association Design Contest for a homebuilt glider. It first flew in 1982. The Solitaire was declared the winner of the contest and its unusual layout attracted a great deal of attention. For a time in the 1980s the aircraft was available as plans and as a kit.

== Design and development ==
Like many Rutan designs, the Solitaire uses a canard layout, with a lifting foreplane with elevators for pitch control at the nose, and a rudder at the rear of a tail boom. The pilot sits under a bubble canopy and the electro-hydraulically retractable gasoline engine occupies the space between the pilot's feet and the canard. The aircraft is constructed from fiberglass on Nomex honeycomb and urethane foam.

The 41.75 ft (12.7 m) wing has a built-in mid-span twist to offset the effects of the canard's downwash, with the inboard 7.4 ft (2.3 m) having 2 degrees less twist than the outboard portion of the wing. The wing is equipped with very effective trailing edge spoilers, consisting of a flap that deploys down while also protruding its leading edge upward into the airflow.

The canard configuration is designed so that the forward surface stalls before the main wing, making the aircraft unstallable, and also unspinnable. This does not mean, however, that the aircraft cannot be maneuvered into a flight regime where a high rate of descent is achieved.

When it was in production, the kit included all the hardware to assemble the prefabricated fiberglass parts. The fuselage halves came with Nomex honeycomb cores and a special film adhesive to bond the halves together. The main wing spars supplied used S-glass roving spar caps that had been molded in metal molds. The kits also included many molded parts, including the seat pan, canopy pre-mounted in its frame, turtledeck, fuselage bulkheads, wing root fairings, wheel fairings, wingtips and the foam cores used in the wings and the canard.

The initial engine was the 22 hp (16 kW) Zenoah G-25, but this was changed to a Robin engine and then later the 20 hp (15 kW) Cuyuna 215. The KFM 107e 22 hp (16 kW) engine has also been used.

== Operational history ==
Within two months of the aircraft's introduction in 1982, 50 to 60 sets of plans had been sold. In March 2011 there were seven Solitaires registered in the United States, including one in the EAA AirVenture Museum.

== Aircraft on display ==
- EAA AirVenture Museum

== Specifications (Solitaire) ==
Data from Sailplane Directory, Soaring and EAA

General characteristics

- Crew: one
- Wingspan: 41 ft 8 in (12.70 m)
- Wing area: 102.44 sq ft (9.517 m^{2})
- Aspect ratio: 10.78
- Airfoil: Roncz 517 (root), Roncz 515 (tip), Roncz 1052 (canard)
- Empty weight: 380 lb (172 kg)
- Gross weight: 620 lb (281 kg)
- Fuel capacity: 5 US gallons (19 litres)
- Powerplant: 1 × Cuyuna 215 , 20 hp (15 kW)
- Propellers: 2-bladed fixed pitch

Performance

- Maximum glide ratio: 32:1
- Rate of sink: 150 ft/min (0.76 m/s)
- Wing loading: 6.05 lb/sq ft (29.5 kg/m^{2})

== See also ==
- List of gliders
