= 2si 215 =

- Type: Two-stroke aircraft engine
- National origin: United States
- Manufacturer: 2si

The 2si 215 is a family of single-cylinder, fan-cooled, two-stroke, single ignition, aircraft engines that were designed for ultralight aircraft.

The basic engine was originally designed and produced by JLO-Motorenwerke of Germany and was later acquired by the AMW Cuyuna Engine Company of Beaufort, South Carolina and marketed under the Cuyuna brand name. Later the engine was marketed by Cuyuna under the Two Stroke International (2si) brand. Cuyuna no longer markets engines for aircraft use although the 215 is still in production as an industrial and multi-fuel engine.

== Development ==
The 215 is a conventional single-cylinder engine that weighs 39 lb (18 kg) in its 215R aircraft version. The engine features single breaker and points ignition, with single capacitor discharge ignition used on the current models. It also incorporates piston porting, tuned exhaust system, single carburetor, fan cooling, fuel pump, a cast iron cylinder liner, ball, needle and roller bearings throughout. The 215R aircraft version was offered with an optional belt reduction system and the modern industrial versions have an optional gearbox with ratios of 2.04, 2.65 and 3.06. Starting is a recoil starter with a custom electric starter available as an option.

== Variants ==
215D
Gasoline aircraft engine with direct drive. Single carburetor, 20 hp (15 kW) at 6000 rpm, weight 42 lb (19 kg), out of production.
215F
Gasoline industrial engine. Single carburetor, 20 hp (15 kW) at 6000 rpm, still in production.
215MF
Multi-fuel industrial engine. Single carburetor, 7 to 12 hp (5 to 9 kW) at 6500 rpm, weight 53 lb (24 kg), still in production.
215R
Gasoline aircraft engine with belt reduction drive. single carburetor, 20 hp (15 kW) at 6000 rpm, weight 39 lb (18 kg), out of production.

== Applications ==
- Advanced Aviation Husky
- Birdman Atlas 215 XC
- Birdman Atlas 215 3-A
- Carlson Sparrow
- Eipper Quicksilver
- Paup P-Craft
- Robertson B1-RD
- Rutan Solitaire
- Striplin Silver Cloud
- Wood Sky Pup

== Specifications (215D aircraft engine) ==
Data from Cuyuna & 2si

=== General characteristics ===
- Type: Single-cylinder, two-stroke aircraft engine
- Bore: 2.658 in (67.5 mm)
- Stroke: 2.362 in (60.0 mm)
- Displacement: 214 cc (13.06 cu in)
- Length: 11.75 in (298.4 mm)
- Width: 7.0 in (177.8 mm)
- Height: 14.0 in (355.6 mm)
- Dry weight: 42 lb (19 kg)

=== Components ===
- Valvetrain: piston porting
- Fuel type: Regular auto fuel
- Oil system: premixed oil and fuel at 50:1
- Cooling system: fan cooled
- Reduction gear: optional belt reduction

=== Performance ===
- Power output: 20 hp (15 kW) at 6000 rpm
- Compression ratio: 12.5:1

== See also ==
- List of aircraft engines
- Hirth F33
- KFM 107
- Rotax 277
