= Birdman Atlas =

Atlas

General information
- Type: Ultralight aircraft
- National origin: Canada
- Manufacturer: Birdman Enterprises
- Designer: Bob Lovejoy
- Status: Production completed
- Number built: more than 500

History
- Introduction date: 1980
- Developed from: Eipper Quicksilver

The Birdman Atlas is a single-seat, high wing, single engine in pusher configuration, ultralight aircraft that was based upon the Eipper Quicksilver design.

== Development ==
The Atlas was introduced to the marketplace in 1980. Production was curtailed in about 1983 as the company concentrated on producing the newer Birdman WT-11 Chinook instead.

The Atlas was a development of the Quicksilver and as such incorporated many of the Quicksilver's features, such as a 6061-T6 aluminum-framed, single-surface Dacron-covered, wire-braced high wing, with the ground wires suspended from a kingpost. The fuselage structure was also built from 6061-T6 aluminum tube.

The early Atlas XC variants used weight shift for control supplemented with a rudder, whereas the later 3-A versions (for 3-Axis) utilized a conventional control system with elevator and rudder, and spoilers for roll control.

== Variants ==
Atlas 215 XC
Foot-launchable single place ultralight powered by a 20 hp (15 kW) 215 cc single cylinder Cuyuna 215 engine. Control system is weight shift, plus rudder. Landing gear includes a shimmy-damped, shock-absorbing tailwheel unit. Available in kit form.
Atlas 250 XC
Foot-launchable single place ultralight powered by a 25 hp (19 kW) 250 cc twin cylinder Rotax engine. Control system is weight shift, plus rudder. Landing gear includes a shimmy-damped, shock-absorbing tailwheel unit. Available in kit form.
Atlas 215 3-A
Non-foot-launchable single place ultralight powered by a 20 hp (15 kW) 215 cc single cylinder Cuyuna 215 engine. Conventional three-axis control system utilizing spoilers for roll-control. Seat is adjustable fore and aft for balance. Due to company concerns about rigging requirements it was only supplied as a completed aircraft.
Atlas 250 3-A
Non-foot-launchable single place ultralight powered by a 25 hp (19 kW) 250 cc twin cylinder Rotax engine. Conventional three-axis control system utilizing spoilers for roll-control. Due to company concerns about rigging requirements it was only supplied as a completed aircraft.

== Specifications (Atlas 215 3-A) ==
Data from Janes All the Worlds Aircraft 1982-83

General characteristics

- Crew: one
- Length: 14 ft 0 in (4.27 m)
- Wingspan: 32 ft 0 in (9.75 m)
- Wing area: 160 sq ft (15 m^{2})
- Aspect ratio: 6.4
- Empty weight: 208 lb (94 kg)
- Max takeoff weight: 475 lb (215 kg)
- Fuel capacity: 2.8 US gallons (13 litres)
- Powerplant: 1 × Cuyuna 215 two stroke snowmobile engine, 20 hp (15 kW)
- Propellers: 2-bladed pusher propeller

Performance

- Maximum speed: 46 mph (74 km/h, 40 kn)
- Cruise speed: 41 mph (66 km/h, 36 kn)
- Stall speed: 20 mph (32 km/h, 17 kn)
- Range: 85 mi (137 km, 74 nmi)
- Endurance: 3 hours 6 minutes
- Rate of climb: 350 ft/min (1.8 m/s) at 2400 feet (732 m) with 150 lb (68 kg) pilot
- Wing loading: 3.1 lb/sq ft (15 kg/m^{2})

== See also ==
Aircraft of comparable role, configuration, and era

- Eipper Quicksilver
