= Freebird II =

American light sport aircraft

FreeBird II

General information
- Type: Light Sport Aircraft
- National origin: United States
- Manufacturer: Freebird Airplane Company
- Status: In production (2016)

History
- Introduction date: 1996
- Variant: Freebird I

The Freebird II is a family of American side-by-side two-seat, high wing, tricycle gear, pusher configuration single engined kit aircraft originally designed for construction by amateur builders by the Freebird Airplane Company of Marshville, North Carolina, and later Pro Sport Aviation of Wingate, North Carolina.

The Freebird II was produced until late 2014 by Free Bird Innovations of Detroit Lakes, Minnesota, as the LiteSport Classic.

== Development ==
The Freebird I was introduced at Sun 'n Fun 1996, and was intended to meet the requirements of the US FAR 103 Ultralight Vehicles category under the two-seat trainer exemption, although it is now offered in the US Light Sport Aircraft or amateur-built categories.

The Freebird II is constructed from bolted aluminum tubing, covered with doped aircraft fabric. The aircraft features conventional three-axis controls, including a trim system. The tricycle landing gear is steered by differential braking and a castering nosewheel. The company estimated that an average builder would take 120 hours to build the aircraft from the assembly kit.

The standard engine recommended is the two-stroke 50 hp (37 kW) Rotax 503 and with this engine the standard empty weight is 385 lb (175 kg). The 64 hp (48 kW) Rotax 582 is also used.

The Freebird II's wings can be folded in five minutes by one person and the aircraft can then be trailered or stored. Options available included full cabin doors, flaperons, brakes, wheel pants and a custom-fitted trailer.

== Variants ==
Freebird II
Initial version, two seats in side-by-side configuration, 28 ft (8.5 m) wingspan, 50 hp (37 kW) Rotax 503, built by Freebird Airplane Company.
Sportlite SS
Improved version, two seats in side-by-side configuration, 28 ft (8.5 m) wingspan, 50 hp (37 kW) Rotax 503, built by Free Bird Innovations.
Sportlite 2
Improved version, two seats in side-by-side configuration, 26 ft (7.9 m) wingspan, 50 hp (37 kW) Rotax 503, built by Free Bird Innovations.
LiteSport II
Improved version, two seats in tandem configuration, 26 ft (7.9 m) wingspan, 50 hp (37 kW) Rotax 503, built by Free Bird Innovations. 352 examples had been completed and flown by 2011.
LiteSport Classic
Current production version, two seats in side-by-side configuration, 28 ft (8.5 m) wingspan, 50 hp (37 kW) Rotax 503 or 64 hp (48 kW) Rotax 582, built by Free Bird Innovations. 102 examples had been completed and flown by 2011.

== Specifications (Freebird II) ==
Data from Cliche

General characteristics

- Crew: one
- Capacity: one passenger
- Length: 17.8 ft (5.4 m)
- Wingspan: 28 ft (8.5 m)
- Height: 5 ft 5 in (1.65 m)
- Wing area: 132 sq ft (12.3 m^{2})
- Empty weight: 385 lb (175 kg)
- Gross weight: 970 lb (440 kg)
- Powerplant: 1 × Rotax 503 two-stroke aircraft engine, 50 hp (37 kW)
- Propellers: 2-bladed ground adjustable, 5 ft 8 in (1.73 m) diameter

Performance

- Maximum speed: 85 mph (137 km/h, 74 kn)
- Cruise speed: 70 mph (110 km/h, 61 kn)
- Stall speed: 32 mph (51 km/h, 28 kn)
- g limits: +6/-3 design structural limit
- Rate of climb: 800 ft/min (4.1 m/s)
- Wing loading: 7.3 lb/sq ft (36 kg/m^{2})

== See also ==
Aircraft of comparable role, configuration, and era

- Birdman Chinook
- ISON Airbike
- Quad City Challenger
- Spectrum Beaver
