= Freebirds =

Freebirds may refer to:

- The Fabulous Freebirds, a professional wrestling stable
- Free Birds, a 2013 American animated buddy comedy film

== See also ==
- Free Bird, a song by the American rock band Lynyrd Skynyrd
