= GSC Systems =

Canadian aircraft components manufacturer

- Industry: Aerospace
- Headquarters: Vernon, British Columbia, Canada
- Products: Aircraft propellers
- Website: www.ultralightprops.com

GSC Systems, founded in 1984, is a Canadian manufacturer of wooden propellers for homebuilt and ultralight aircraft. The company headquarters is located in Vernon, British Columbia.

The company was originally part of Aircraft Sales and Parts, but was sold off to an employee in 2000. Originally producing fixed pitch wooden propellers, the company expanded into ground adjustable designs and more recently introducing the GSC-GTA, a mechanical, inflight-adjustable propeller. Their propeller blades are all made from eastern maple hardwood.

Originally called GSC Systems International Ltd., the company is now officially GSC Systems (2004) Ltd.

== Applications ==
- Sundog One-Seater
- Sundog Two-Seater

== See also ==
- List of aircraft propeller manufacturers
