= Freebird I =

American ultralight airplane

FreeBird I

General information
- Type: Ultralight aircraft
- National origin: United States
- Manufacturer: Freebird Airplane Company
- Status: In production (2016)

History
- Introduction date: 1998
- Developed from: Freebird II

The Freebird I is an American single-seat, high wing, tricycle gear, single engined pusher configuration ultralight kit aircraft designed for construction by amateur builders by the Freebird Airplane Company of Marshville, North Carolina and later also produced by Pro Sport Aviation of Wingate, North Carolina.

The original Freebird I design was further refined and developed and was produced until late 2014 by Free Bird Innovations of Detroit Lakes, Minnesota as the LiteSport Ultra.

== Development ==
The Freebird I was developed from the two-seater Freebird II that had been introduced at Sun 'n Fun 1996. The single seater was introduced in 1998 and retains the configuration and many features of the two seater, but with a revised, narrower fuselage. The aircraft was intended to meet the requirements of the US FAR 103 Ultralight Vehicles category, including that category's maximum 254 lb (115 kg) empty weight.

The Freebird I is constructed from bolted aluminum tubing, covered with doped aircraft fabric. The aircraft features conventional three-axis controls, including a trim system. The tricycle landing gear is steered by differential braking and a castering nosewheel. The company estimated that an average builder would take 120 hours to build the aircraft from the assembly kit.

The standard engine recommended is the two-stroke 40 hp (30 kW) Rotax 447 and with this engine the standard empty weight is 252 lb (114 kg).

The Freebird I's wings can be folded in five minutes by one person and the aircraft can then be trailered or stored. Options available included full cabin doors, flaperons, brakes, wheel pants and a custom-fitted trailer.

The original Freebird I has been replaced in the company line by the improved LiteSport Ultra. A new variant, the Freebird 103, using the same wing with a redesigned fuselage, was under development in 2009.

== Variants ==
Freebird I
Original model introduced in 1998, single seat ultralight with 40 hp (30 kW) Rotax 447 and standard empty weight of 252 lb (114 kg), built by Freebird Airplane Company and Pro Sport Aviation.
Sportlite 103
Improved model single seat ultralight with 40 hp (30 kW) Rotax 447 and standard empty weight of 250 lb (113 kg), built by and Pro Sport Aviation and Free Bird Innovations. This single seat model can be converted into a two-seater and has an acceptable power range of 22 to 52 hp (16 to 39 kW). When it was in production it was available as a quick-build kit, fully assembled or as plans. The plans were extensive and included a 200 page construction manual, templates, covering instructions and a complete materials list. In 2001 the plans were US$185 and the manufacturer estimated that it would take 250 hours to build the aircraft from the plans. To help plans builders the manufacturer allowed builders to order any parts that they wanted without buying the complete kit.
LiteSport Ultra
Improved current production model, single seat kit aircraft with 40 hp (30 kW) Rotax 447 and standard empty weight of 280 lb (127 kg), built by Free Bird Innovations. 357 had been completed and flown by 2011
Freebird 103
Model originally projected for introduction in 2011 as a single seat US FAR 103 ultralight aircraft with a design empty weight under 254 lb (115 kg). The 103 intended to use the LiteSport Ultra wing mated to a newly CAD designed fuselage frame to save weight and was to be built by Free Bird Innovations. The project was set back when the lead project engineer, Eric Grina, was killed in a car accident in October 2011.

== Specifications (Freebird I) ==
Data from Cliche

General characteristics

- Crew: one
- Empty weight: 252 lb (114 kg)
- Gross weight: 637 lb (289 kg)
- Powerplant: 1 × Rotax 447 two-stroke aircraft engine, 40 hp (30 kW)
- Propellers: 2-bladed ground adjustable

Performance

- Maximum speed: 63 mph (101 km/h, 55 kn)
- Cruise speed: 60 mph (97 km/h, 52 kn)
- Rate of climb: 800 ft/min (4.1 m/s)

== See also ==
Aircraft of comparable role, configuration, and era

- Avid Champion
- Beaujon Enduro
- Birdman Chinook
- Chotia Gypsy
- Fisher FP-202 Koala
- Fisher FP-606 Sky Baby
- ISON Airbike
- Spectrum Beaver
