= Vogelfrei (disambiguation) =

Vogelfrei is a German-language legal status that literally means "free as a bird".

Vogelfrei may also refer to:

== Music ==
- Vogelfrei (album), by Takanashi Kiara
- "Vogelfrei", song from Ballast der Republik
- Vogelfrei, recording by Gunter Hampel

== Other uses ==
- Vogelfrei (film), by Jānis Kalējs
- Vogelfrei: Frühe Gedichte 1935–1940, poetry collection of Alfred Marnau

== See also ==
- "Vogelfrei II", track from Junk (Shinjuku Filth album)
- Free as a Bird (disambiguation)
