= Free Bird Innovations =

American aircraft manufacturer

Free Bird Innovations, Inc.
- Company type: Privately held company
- Industry: Aerospace
- Founded: circa 2003
- Headquarters: Detroit Lakes, Minnesota, United States
- Key people: Engineer: Eric Grina
- Products: Kit aircraft
- Website: www.fly-fbi.com

Free Bird Innovations, Inc. is an American aircraft manufacturer based in Detroit Lakes, Minnesota and formed in about 2003. The company specializes in the design and manufacture of ultralight aircraft in the form of plans and kits for amateur construction and ready-to-fly aircraft in the US FAR 103 Ultralight Vehicles category.

== History ==
The two-seat Freebird II was introduced by the Freebird Airplane Company of Marshville, North Carolina at Sun 'n Fun in 1996. Two years later they brought out the single-seat Freebird I before going out of business. By 2000 both designs were being built by Pro Sport Aviation of Wingate, North Carolina, who also built a derivative single-seater, the Pro Sport Sportlite 103.

Free Bird Innovations took over the Freebird I and II designs and by 2004 was producing three derivative models, the single-seat Free Bird Sportlite 103 kit aircraft for the US FAR 103 ultralight category and the Free Bird Sportlite SS and Free Bird Sportlite 2 two-seaters. In 2007, they were building three further developed models, the single-seat Free Bird LiteSport Ultra and the two-seat Free Bird LiteSport II and Free Bird LiteSport Classic and continued those models through 2011. The LiteSport II model had been dropped by 2012.

Despite the LiteSport model name, none of the company's aircraft were ever listed by the US Federal Aviation Administration as light-sport aircraft.

The company had been developing a new model, the Freebird 103, originally projected for introduction in 2011, as a single seat US FAR 103 ultralight aircraft with a design empty weight under 254 lb (115 kg). The project received a setback when the lead project engineer, Eric Grina, was killed in a car accident in October 2011.

== Aircraft ==
Summary of aircraft built by Free Bird Innovations and its predecessors
Model name	First flight	Number built	Type
Freebird II	1996		Single-seat ultralight aircraft produced by Freebird Airplane Company & Pro Sport Aviation
Freebird I	1998		Two-seat ultralight aircraft produced by Freebird Airplane Company & Pro Sport Aviation
Free Bird Sportlite 103	by 2004		Single-seat ultralight aircraft produced by Free Bird Innovations
Free Bird Sportlite SS	by 2004		Two-seat ultralight aircraft produced by Free Bird Innovations
Free Bird Sportlite 2	by 2004		Two-seat ultralight aircraft produced by Free Bird Innovations
Free Bird LiteSport Ultra	by 2007	357 (2011)	Single-seat ultralight aircraft produced by Free Bird Innovations
Free Bird LiteSport II	by 2007	352 (2011)	Two-seat ultralight aircraft produced by Free Bird Innovations
Free Bird LiteSport Classic	by 2007	102 (2011)	Two-seat ultralight aircraft produced by Free Bird Innovations
Free Bird 103	2011	One	Single-seat ultralight aircraft planned but never produced by Free Bird Innovations
