= Aircraft Sales and Parts =

U.S. kit aircraft and parts manufacturer

- Industry: Aerospace
- Founded: 1988
- Founder: Brent Holomis
- Headquarters: Sealy, Texas, United States
- Products: Homebuilt aircraft, Ultralight aircraft, aircraft parts
- Owner: John and Kim Couch
- Subsidiaries: Summit Powered Parachutes; Steel Breeze Powered Parachute; ppccanopies.com; ulparts.com
- Website: aeroplanemanufactory.com

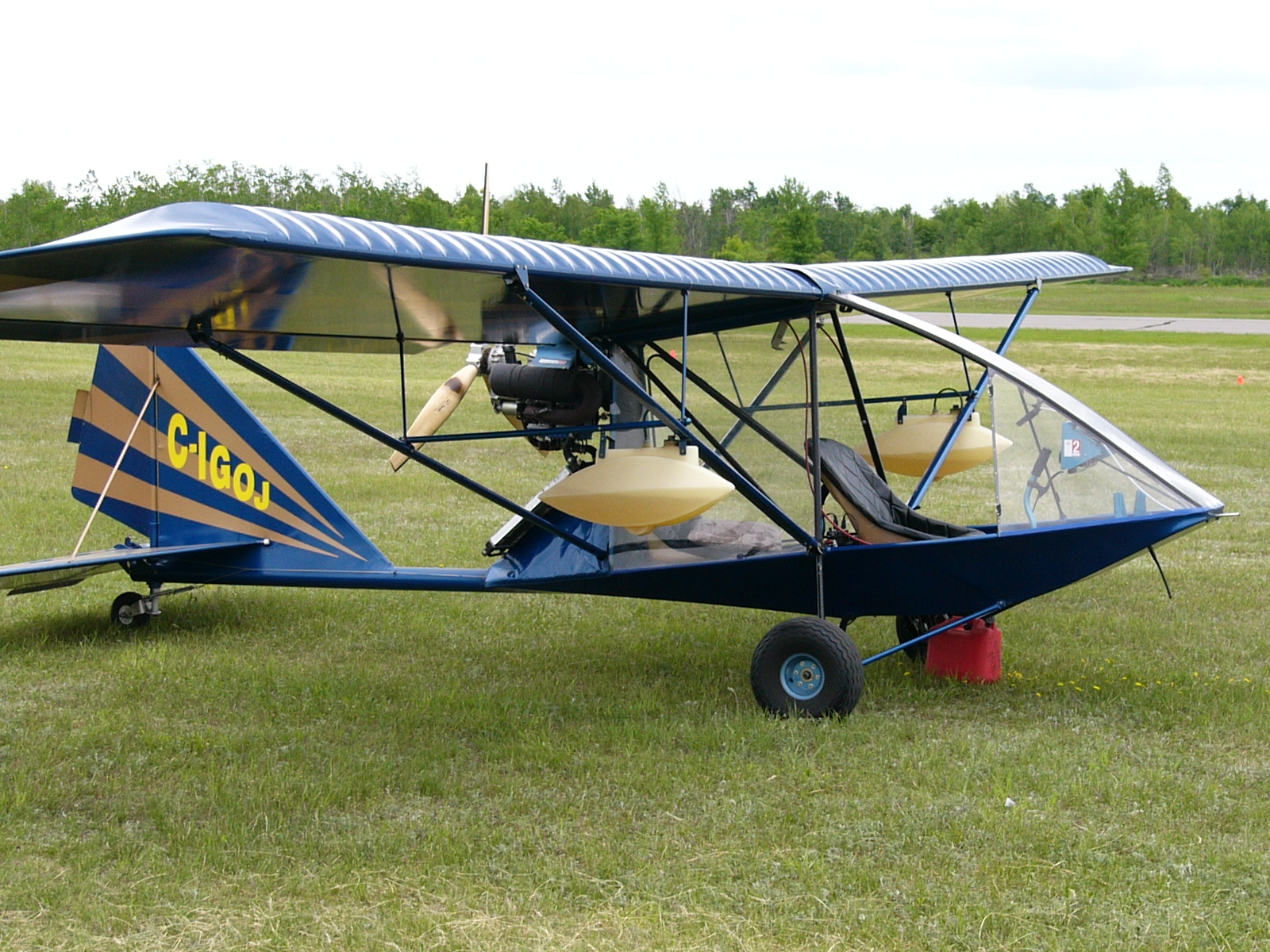
ASAP Chinook Plus 2

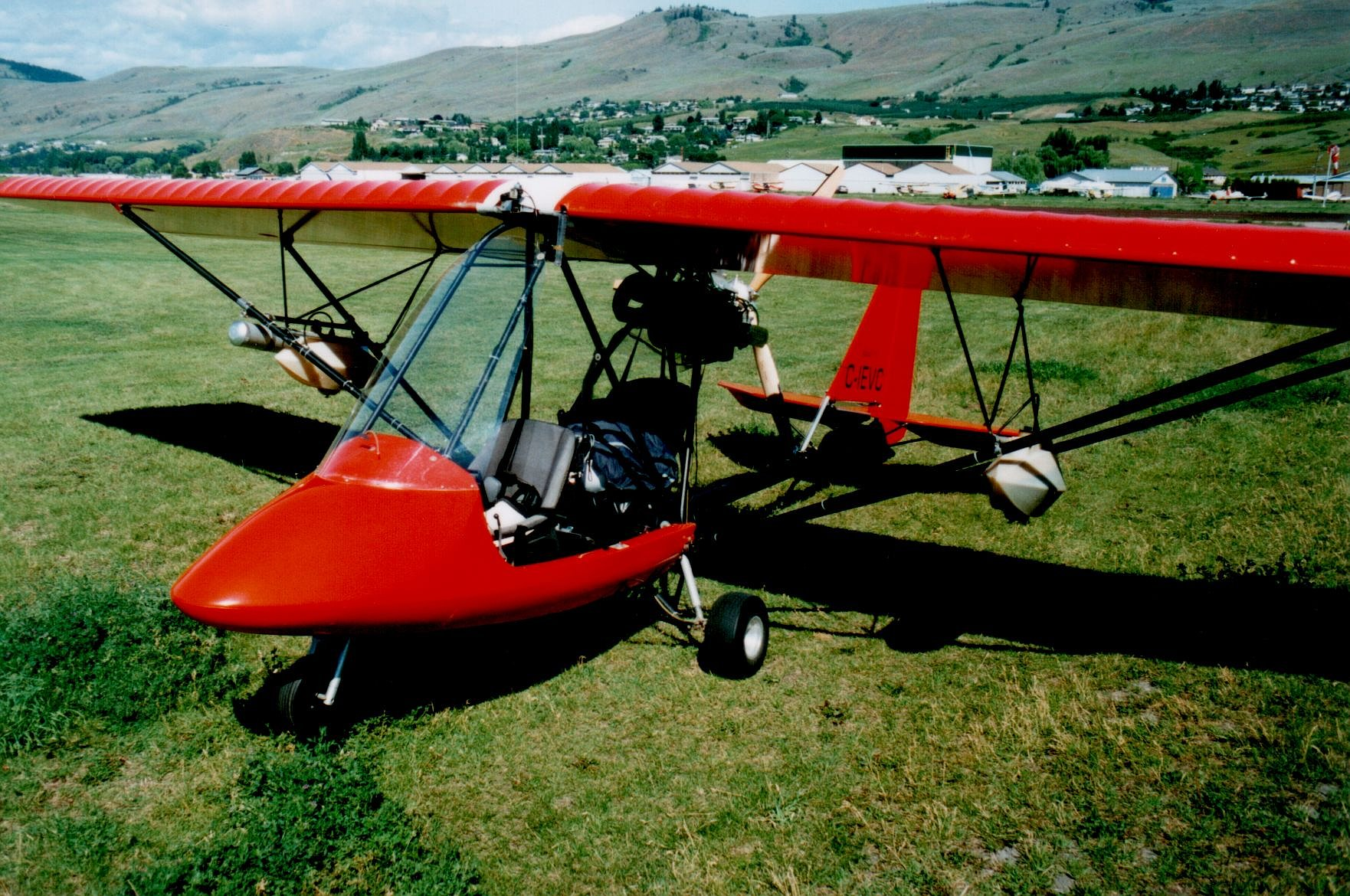
ASAP Beaver RX-550

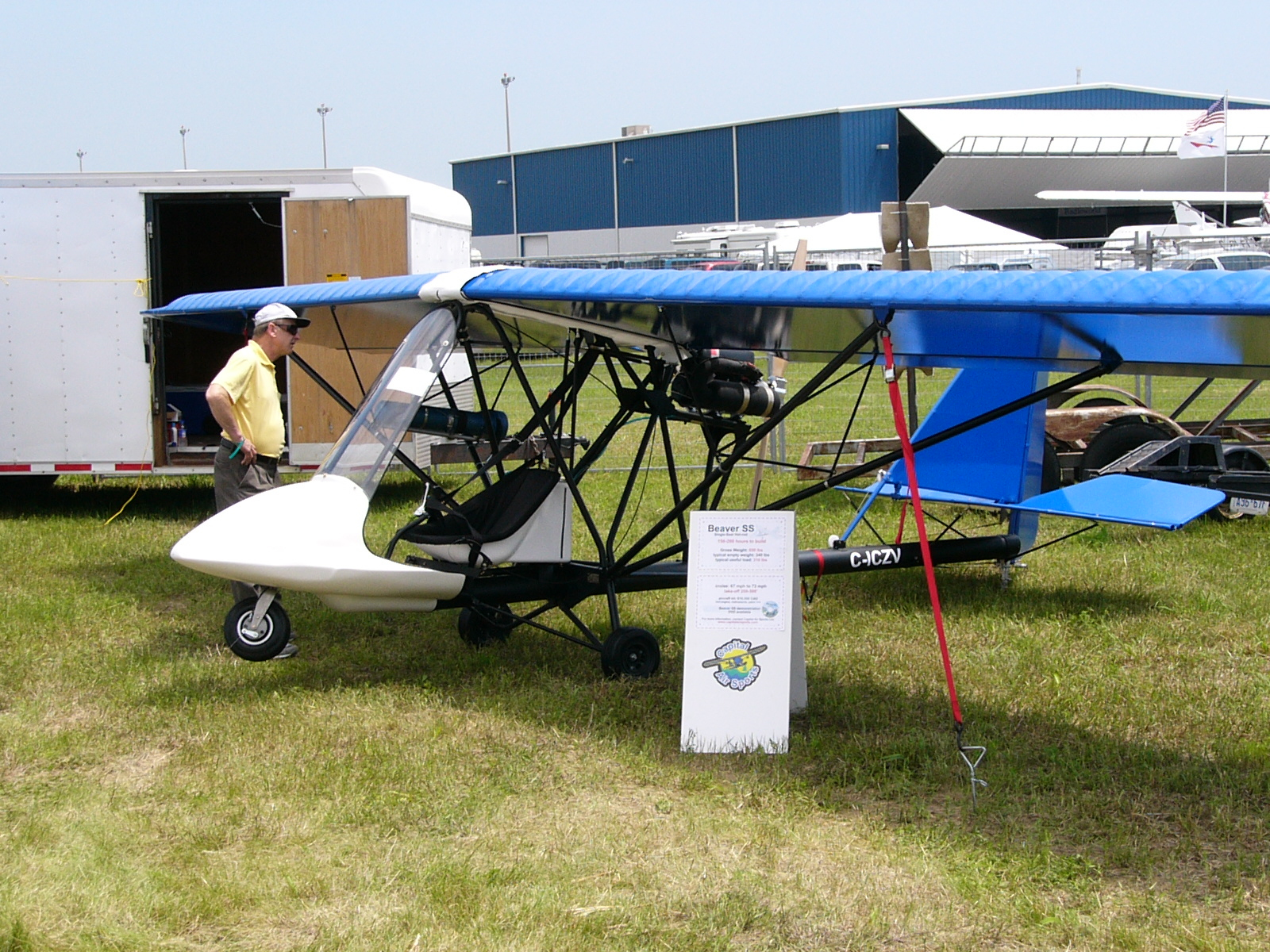
ASAP Beaver SS at the Canadian Aviation Expo

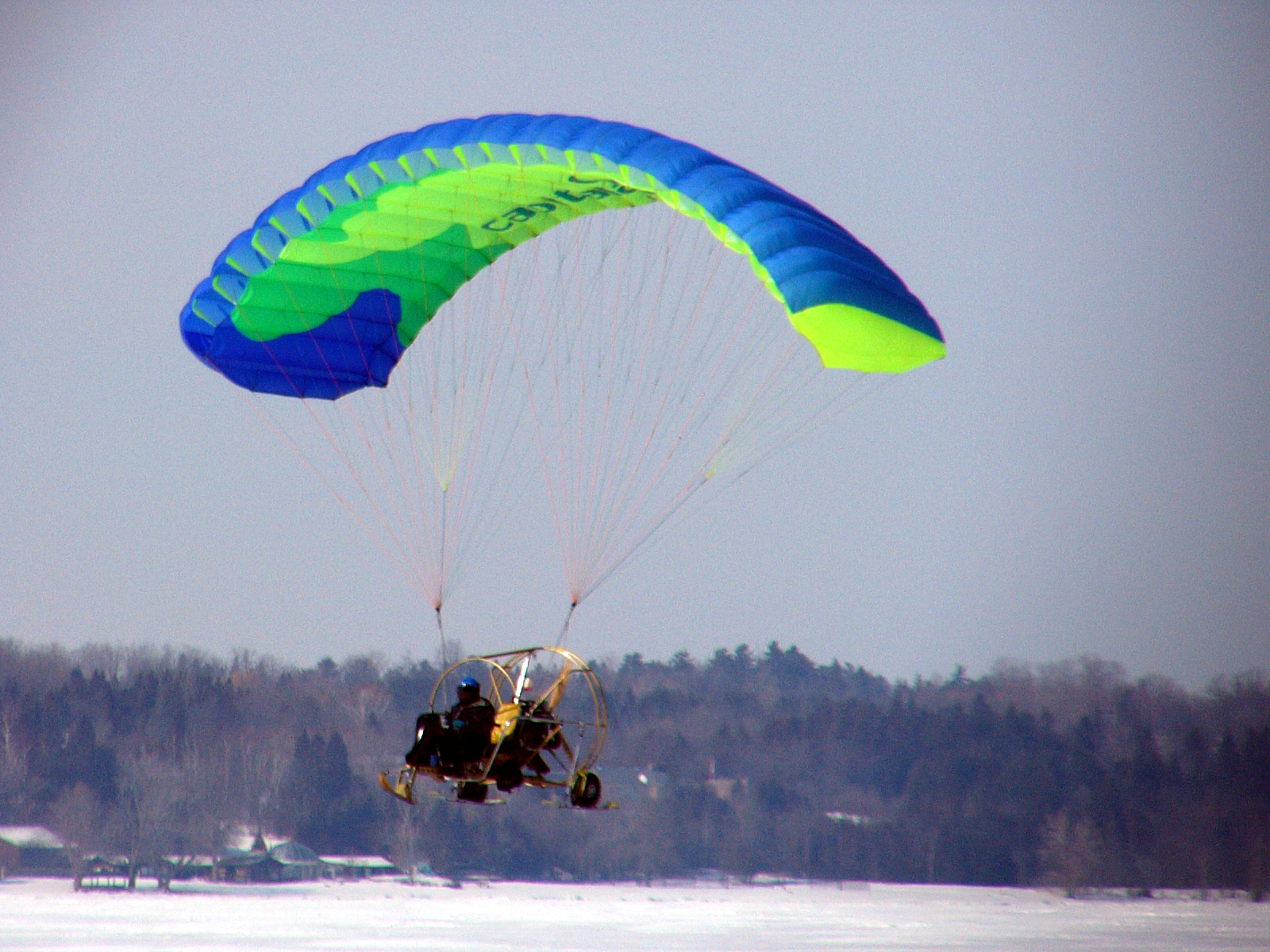
Summit II powered parachute

Aircraft Sales and Parts (ASAP) is an American kit aircraft and parts manufacturer, founded in Vernon, British Columbia and moved to Sealy, Texas in 2013 and renamed the Aeroplane Manufactory. In 2023 the Aeroplane Manufactory sold its inventory and aircraft production rights to Legacy AIR1.

ASAP produced a line of single and two place ultralight kit aircraft, powered parachutes and parts though the parent company and also through its divisions Summit Powered Parachutes, Steel Breeze Powered Parachutes, ppccanopies.com and ulparts.com.

== History ==
The company was founded by Brent Holomis in 1988. Holomis owned a Birdman Chinook WT2S two-seat ultralight and when Birdman Enterprises went out of business in late 1987 it left Chinook owners without a source of parts.

Initially the company was started to provide Chinook parts, but Holomis proceeded to redesign the Chinook with assistance from Dr David Marsden at the University of Alberta, who had been involved in the first Chinook design. In 1989 ASAP unveiled the improved ASAP Chinook Plus 2. With the acquisition of Canadian Ultralight Manufacturing in St Paul, Alberta who had manufactured the earlier Chinook WT11 and WT2S, the Chinook Plus 2 was placed into production.

In 1992 Spectrum Aircraft of Surrey, British Columbia, the manufacturer of the Spectrum Beaver aircraft line, went out of business and the following year ASAP began making parts for the existing RX-28, RX-35 and RX-550 Beaver fleet. In 1996, after a similar development program to the Chinook Plus 2, ASAP introduced an improved two-seat Beaver, designated the RX-550 Plus. In 2000 ASAP introduced the Beaver SS (single seat) to replace the RX-28 and RX-35 single seat Beavers that had gone out of production with Spectrum's 1992 demise.

ASAP at one time owned GSC Propellers who made a line of wooden blade, aluminum hub, ground adjustable propellers for the ultralight aircraft market. Founded in 1984 GSC Propellers initially operated from the ASAP Vernon facility. The company was sold in 2000 and, while still located in Vernon, changed its name to GSC Systems in 2004.

In the late 1990s ASAP decided to develop a line of aluminum-framed powered parachutes. These were developed and manufactured in-house at ASAP, but marketed by a separate division, Summit Powered Parachutes International. The models presently consist of the two place Summit 2 and the single-seat Summit SS. The company is now called Summit Aerosports Inc and is located in Yale, Michigan.

ASAP also designed two welded steel tube-frame powered parachute models especially for the US market. These are manufactured by ASAP and marketed by another corporate division, Steel Breeze Powered Parachutes. This division offers two models, the Summit Steel Breeze two-place and the United States ultralight category FAR 103 Ultralight Vehicles compliant Summit 103 Mini Steel Breeze. As of 2012 Steel Breeze was a line marketed by Summit Aerosports Inc of Yale, Michigan.

The corporate division, www.ppccanopies.com (now called ASAP Canopies based in Yale, Michigan) sells powered parachute and powered paraglider canopies, while www.ulparts.com provides engines and ultralight parts. ASAP itself provides parts for the legacy Birdman Chinook and Spectrum Beaver aircraft fleets.

In 2013 the company was sold to John and Kim Couch, moved to Sealy, Texas and renamed the Aeroplane Manufactory LLC. Initially producing just parts, by May 2016 the company had commenced Chinook Plus 2 kit production.

In 2023 Aeroplane Manufactory LLC was sold to Legacy AIR1.

== Aircraft ==
Summary of aircraft built by ASAP
Model name	First flight	Number built	Type
Chinook Plus 2	1989		Two-place fixed wing ultralight
Beaver RX-550 Plus	1996		Two-place fixed wing ultralight
Beaver SS	2000	10 (2007)	Single-place fixed wing ultralight
Summit 2	2000		Two-place powered parachute
Summit SS			Single-place powered parachute
Steel Breeze Two Place			Two-place powered parachute
103 Mini Steel Breeze			Single-place powered parachute
