= Birdman Chinook =

Canadian ultralight aircraft

Chinook
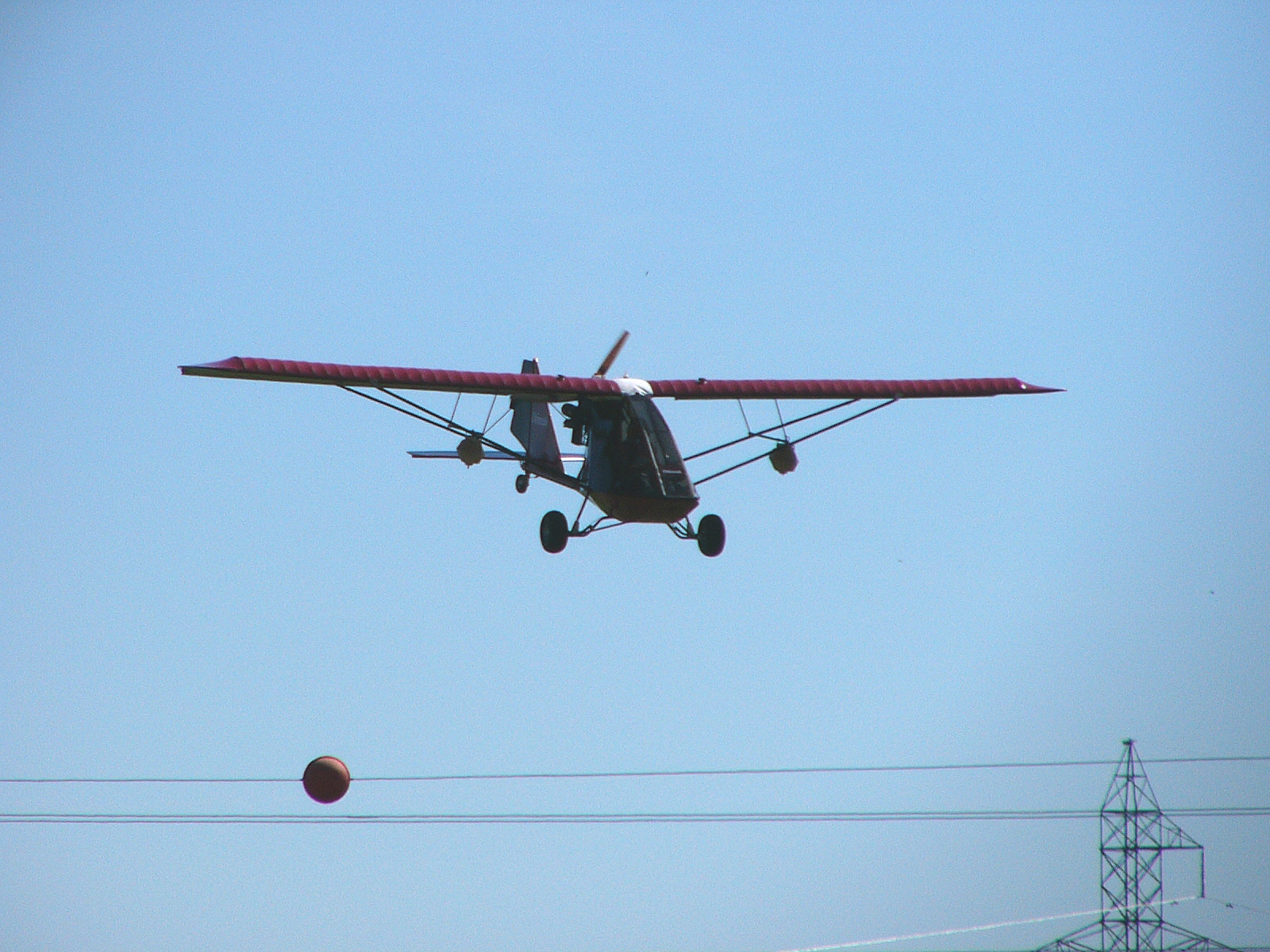
- ASAP Chinook Plus 2

General information
- Type: Ultralight aircraft
- National origin: Canada
- Manufacturer: Aircraft Sales and Parts
- Designer: Vladimir Talanczuk
- Status: Kits in production
- Number built: 1100 (2011)

History
- Manufactured: 1983-1987; 1989-2013; 2016-present
- Introduction date: 1983
- First flight: 12 December 1982

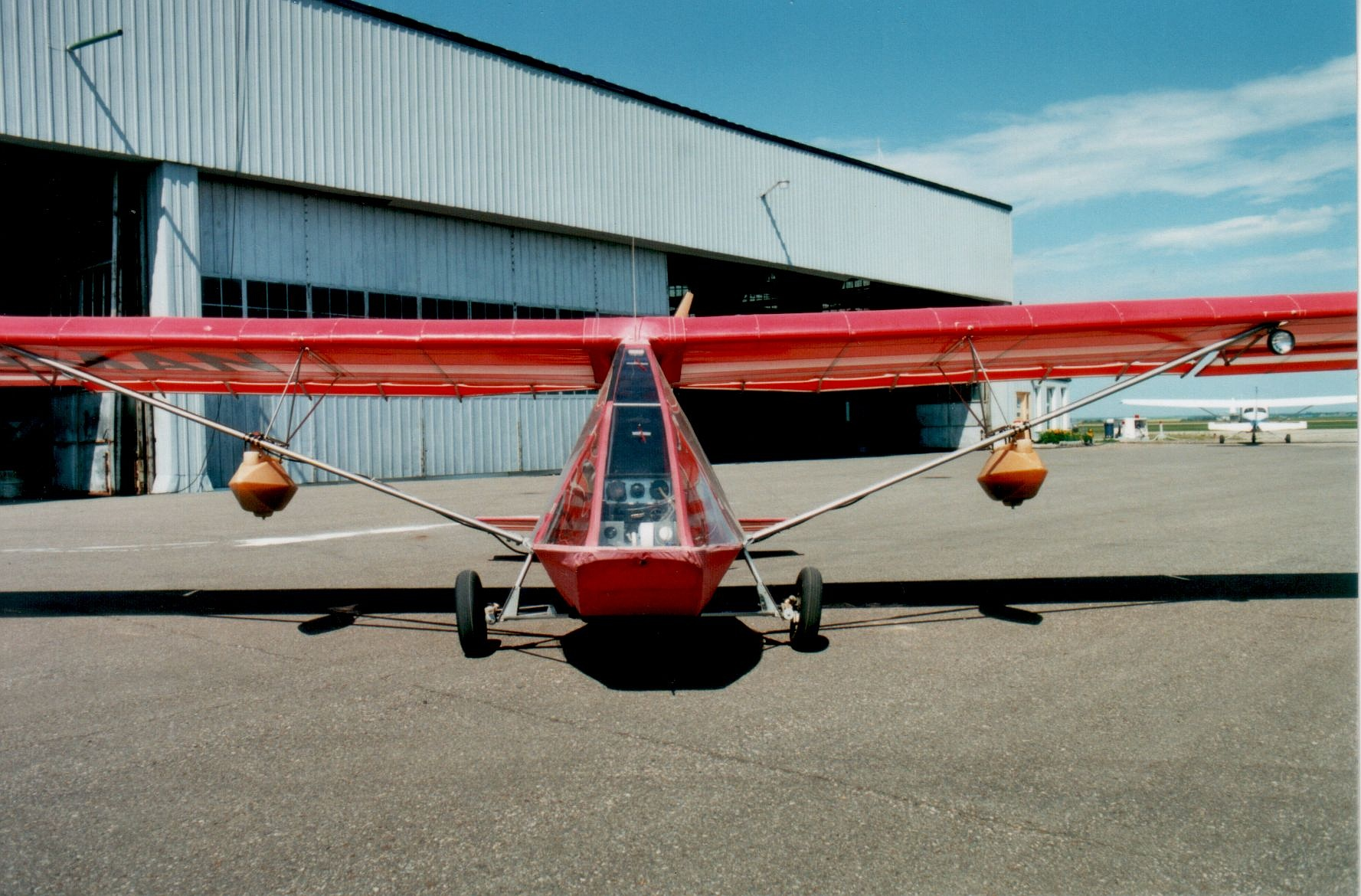
Birdman Chinook 2S showing the pentagonal cockpit cross-section

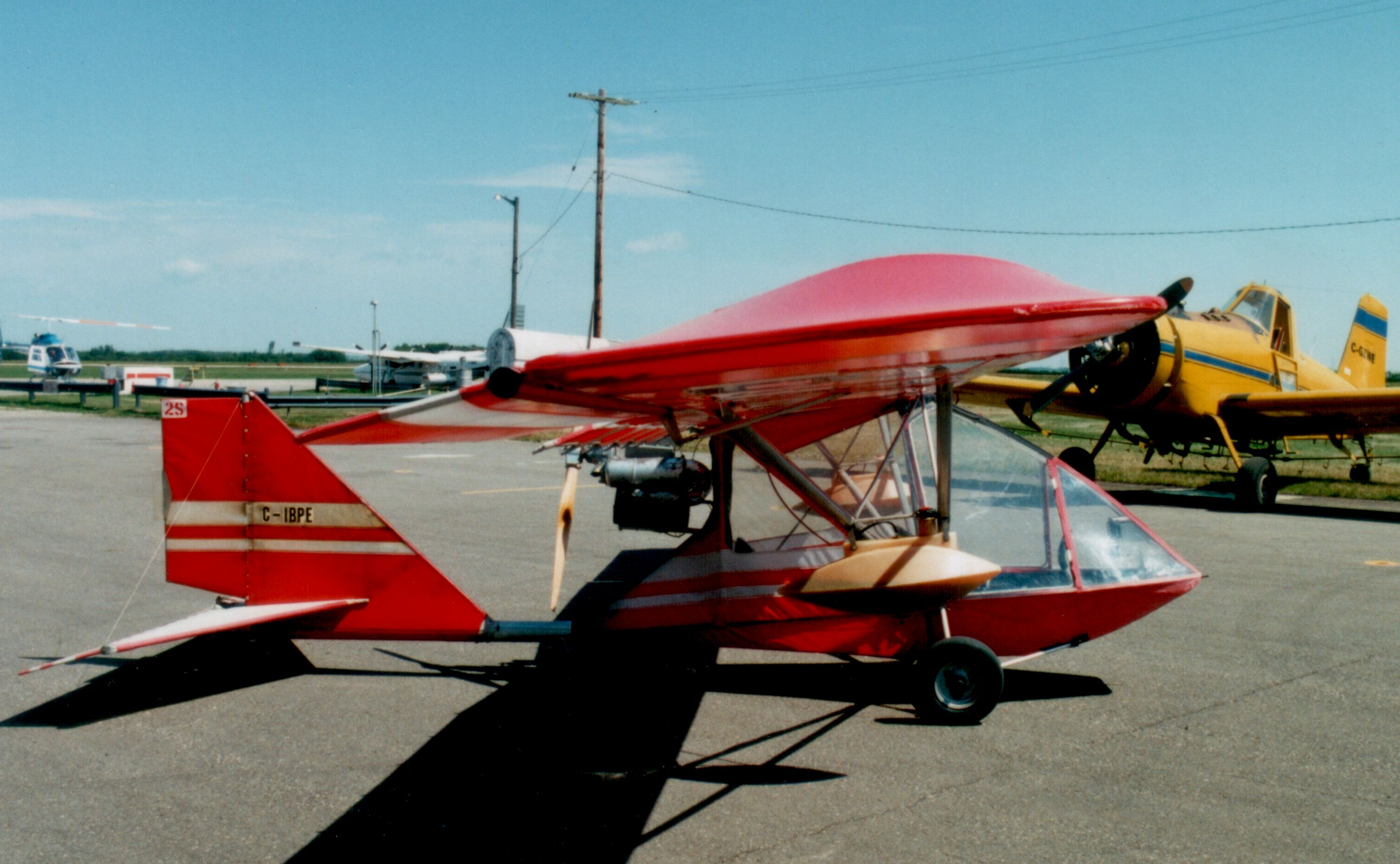
Birdman Chinook 2S

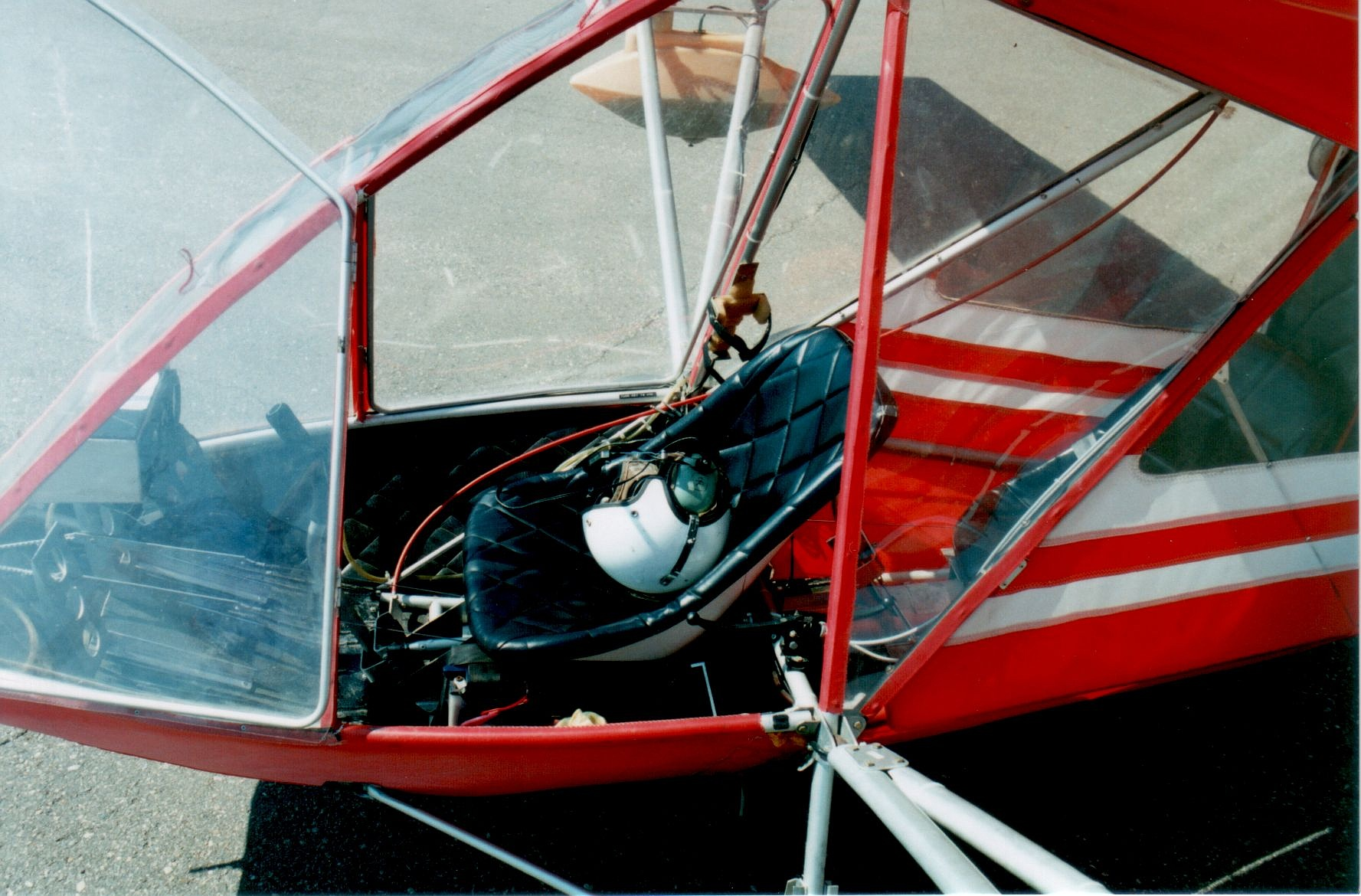
Birdman Chinook 2S cockpit

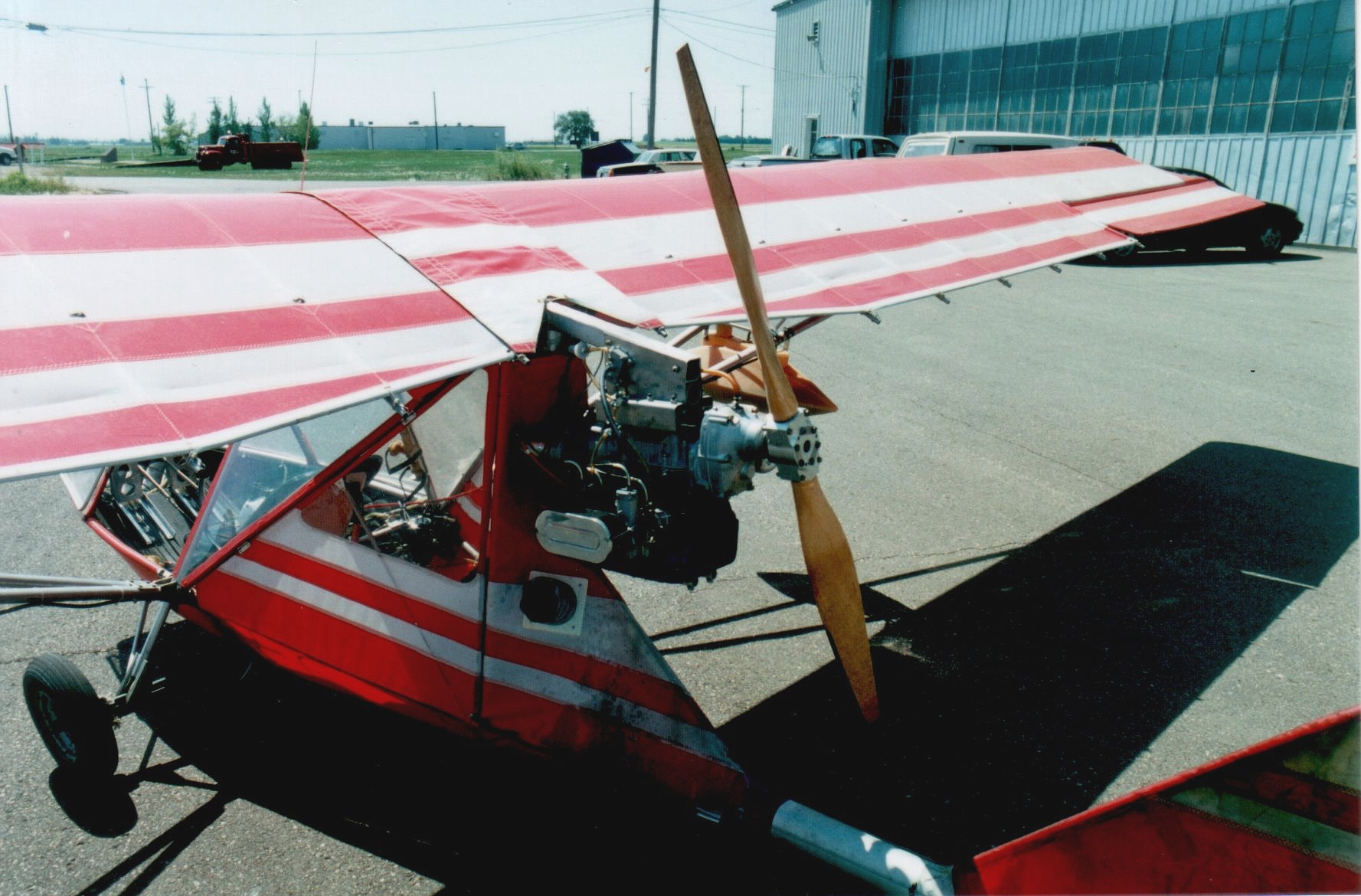
Birdman Chinook 2S Rotax 503 engine installation

The Birdman Chinook is a family of single and two-place, pusher configuration, high-wing ultralight aircraft that was first flown on 12 December 1982 and produced by Birdman Enterprises of Edmonton, Alberta, Canada, starting in 1983.

The Chinook design has evolved through several models over time, and has been produced by two companies. Over 850 in total have been completed and flown, and kits remain in production in the 21st century.

== Design and development ==
=== Chinook WT-11 ===
==== Design goals ====
The first Chinook model introduced was the single-seat WT-11, which entered the market in 1983. The WT-11 was the eleventh aircraft designed by Ukrainian-born aeronautical engineer Vladimir Talanczuk, a graduate of the Polish Institute for Aviation Specialists. The airfoil was developed by Dr Dave Marsden at the University of Alberta and is designated as the UA 80/1.

The company design goals for the WT-11 were:

- Good flying characteristics
- Simplicity of construction
- Maximization of aesthetics

Designer Talanczuk stated his own design intentions:

An Ultralight is not only a fun machine, it should also be usable for utility purposes —— training, fishing trips, crop-spraying and even for freight carrying. But an Ultralight should be affordable by many people, so it shouldn't become expensive. The wings, for example, can't be complicated. They should be easy to build and fix.

The WT-11 was designed to comply with the then-new US FAR 103 Ultralight Vehicles category, including the maximum 254 lb (115 kg) empty weight. With the 28 hp (21 kW) Rotax 277 single cylinder, two stroke powerplant the aircraft has a factory standard empty weight of 250 lb (113 kg). The 35 hp (26 kW) Rotax 377 engine became quickly available as an option to give the aircraft more power on floats.

In 1987, the WT-11 was redesignated as the Chinook 1S (1 Seat) by the company to align its nomenclature with the later two-seat Chinook 2S model.

==== Construction ====
Talanczuk's design is a high-wing, enclosed cabin monoplane with a high aspect ratio wing of 8.75:1, giving a large wingspan of 35 feet (11 m). This gives the WT-11 a very low span-loading as well as a light wing loading. The glide ratio is 10:1 at 35 mph (56 km/h) and minimum sink is 350 fpm (1.78 m/s) at 32 mph (51 km/h). Chinooks have been soared power-off for long duration flights. The low-drag airframe and high aspect ratio wings gave remarkably good performance on the 28 hp (21 kW) Rotax 277 engine and the aircraft can cruise at 50 mph (80 km/h) burning 1.5 US gallons per hour (5.7 litres/h) of automotive fuel, giving a range of 200 miles (320 km) on 5 US gal (19 L) of fuel.

The aircraft is constructed entirely from 6061-T6 aluminium tubing, bolted together with aircraft-grade AN hardware and covered with 3.9 oz/yd^{2} (132 g/m^{2}) Dacron. The covering includes zippers to facilitate inspection. The structure was static load tested to +6/-3 g. The fuselage is built on a 4 in (10 cm) central "spinal" tube that supports the cockpit and the tail surfaces. The cockpit is of a unique pentagonal cross-section that provides a very wide 38 in (97 cm) cabin at hip level. The upper cockpit tubing curves down to the aircraft's nose at a ratio of 3:1 to provide a compromise between internal cockpit space and streamlining and gives the Chinook its distinctive profile.

The landing gear is of conventional configuration, with bungee suspension, giving good rough field capabilities. The enclosed cabin includes a cargo area that is located on the aircraft's center of gravity, eliminating trim changes as the load varies.

The wing is a two-spar design, supported by a "V" strut and jury struts. The wing has internal lift and drag bracing wires. The ailerons were originally designed to be "gapless", with the wing's Dacron covering extending over the ailerons. This is sometimes referred to as wing warping, but it differs from that employed on pioneer aircraft. In 1986, the company abandoned the "gapless" aileron design and moved to a more conventional separate aileron. Conversion kits for the existing aircraft fleet were made available. The WT-11's wings are removable by two people in 15 minutes. The tail surfaces use a similar sealed-gap system, utilizing seamless transitions from the fixed fin and horizontal stabilizer to the movable rudder and elevator.

The factory claimed that construction time from the assembly kit was 100 hours for a first time builder. The price for a WT-11 in 1984 was Can$7995 (US$6395).

==== Test flying ====
Test flying the WT-11 was carried out following the first flight on 12 December 1982 at Wizard Lake, Alberta, by company chief test pilot Dennis Maland.

Initial results showed that with the 28 hp (21 kW) Rotax 277 engine the aircraft would sustain level flight at low throttle settings and would cruise comfortably at 50 mph (80 km/h). The stall speed was noted as 23-25 mph (37–41 km/h). Maland rated the rudder and elevators as "very responsive" and the ailerons as "less sensitive but good", with roll rates from 45 to 45 degrees of 3.5 seconds at cruise speed.

Cross wind testing showed the aircraft was controllable in winds of 20 mph (32 km/h) at 45 degrees and 15 mph (24 km/h) at 90 degrees. The aircraft was flown in 35 mph (56 km/h) surface winds safely. Take-off roll was recorded as 100–200 feet (31–62 m) and distance to clear a 50 ft (15 m) obstacle was 200–300 feet (62–93 m) at 2,500 ft (762 m) above sea level.

Extensive stall and spin testing was carried out at Wizard Lake on 28 December 1982. Straight-ahead and turning power-off stalls resulted in a stable mush condition. Power-on stalls from 30 degrees nose up resulted in a +15 degree nose up stable mush, with no wing drop tendency. A near-vertical pitch resulted in a clean stall, with a smooth pitch forward and recovery to level flight with no wing drop tendency.

Spin testing entered from level flight, snap rolls and turning stalls failed to produce a spin condition as the WT-11 just mushed to level flight. These tests resulted in the company billing the aircraft as "Won't Spin".

The remaining flight testing established the service ceiling as 15,000 ft (4,572 m) and the absolute ceiling as 18,400 ft (5,608 m). Many dives to the V_{NE} of 85 mph (137 km/h) were completed without deformation, flutter or instability. Outside loops, rolls, snap rolls, stall turns, tail slides and inverted flight were all completed as test procedures, although the company recommended against customers conducting these manoeuvres.

==== Floats ====
The WT-11 was tested on fiberglass floats, mounted close to the fuselage. Company testing showed take-off distances of about 300 feet (100 m) on the water and no need for additional vertical surfaces to be added.

=== Chinook 2S ===
Building on the success of the single-seat Chinook, Birdman introduced the two place Chinook 2S (2 seater) in 1984, and it quickly gained popularity as an ultralight trainer and also as a recreational aircraft. The 2S combined the WT-11's ease of handling, docile stall characteristics and spin-proofness with the reliable Rotax 447 42 hp (31 kW) and later the Rotax 503 50 hp (37 kW) engine. One flight review writer noted, "The stall was the most benign that I have even seen in any airplane. At full back stick, it just mushes downward slowly with the nose level, at about 200-400 rpm. Releasing the stick returns the Chinook to flying with little altitude loss."

The construction of the 2S is similar to the WT-11, with the wingspan increased by 2.0 ft (61 cm) and the same fuselage as the WT-11, with the second seat where the WT-11's baggage area is located. The fuel tank was relocated from the fuselage to both wing struts as aerodynamically shaped plastic tanks, where they are visible in flight and the fuel level can be quickly determined. Some WT-11s have had these strut tanks installed as well.

In assessing the handling of the 2S, one reviewer wrote:

Pitch proved to be neutrally stable – it just stayed where it was put. The ailerons were the same. In a bank, the Chinook was just happy to stay at that bank angle, neither rolling itself out nor overbanking. The yaw axis was interesting – it remained slightly stable with feet on the pedals, but with feet off and the rudder removed from the fin effect as it floated, the aircraft was unstable. In this mode, it slowly diverged from the direction desired, but was easy to control with the feet where they belong on the pedals. Clearly this is an aircraft that requires attention in flight, but I found that the overall effect is that it feels sprightly, not unstable.

The two models of the Chinook built by Birdman were only in production for five years before the company went out of business in late 1987, but close to 700 aircraft were delivered in that time. The kits were made at the Canadian Ultralight Manufacturing facility in St Paul, Alberta.

=== Chinook Plus 2 ===
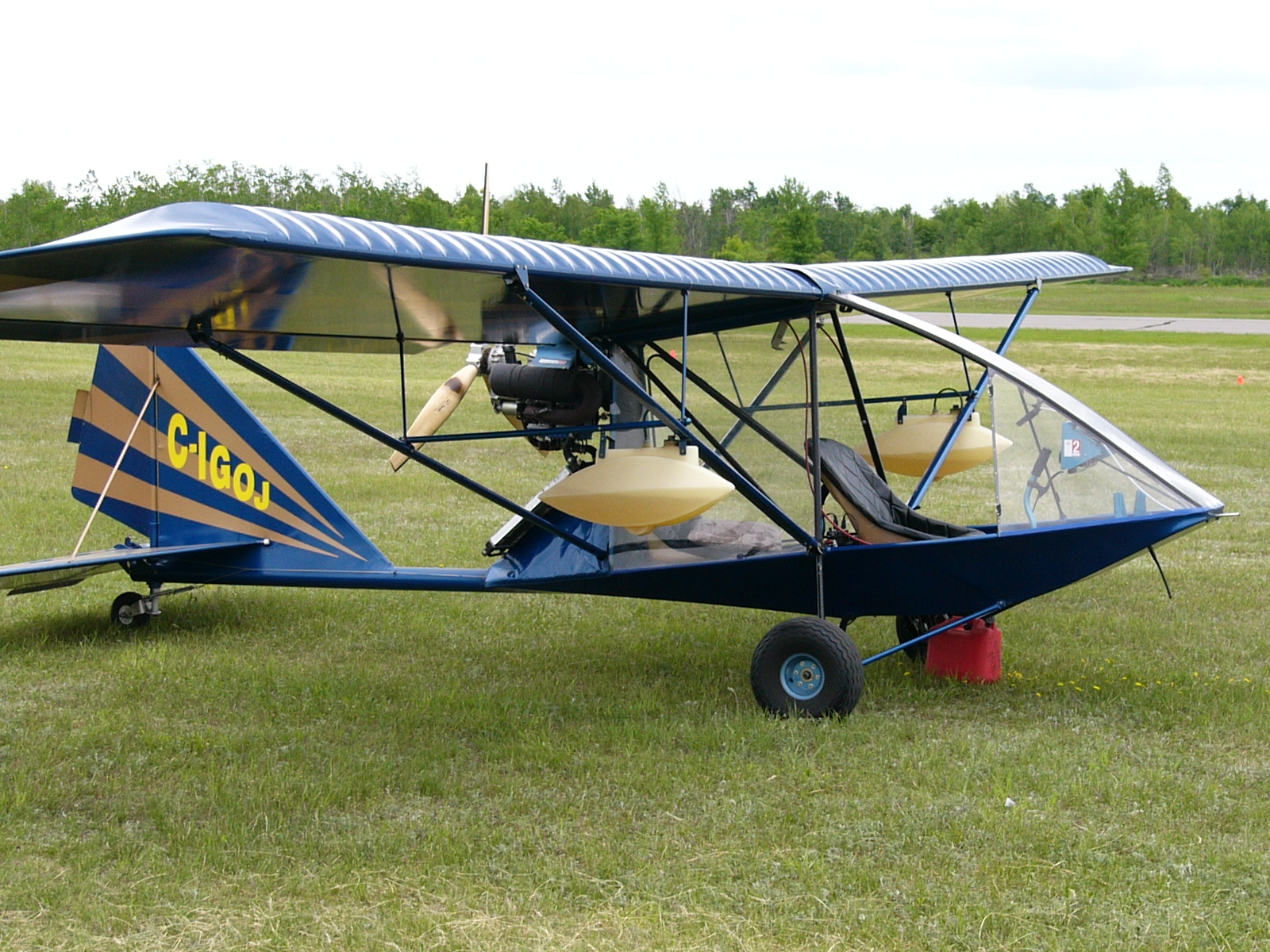
ASAP Chinook Plus 2

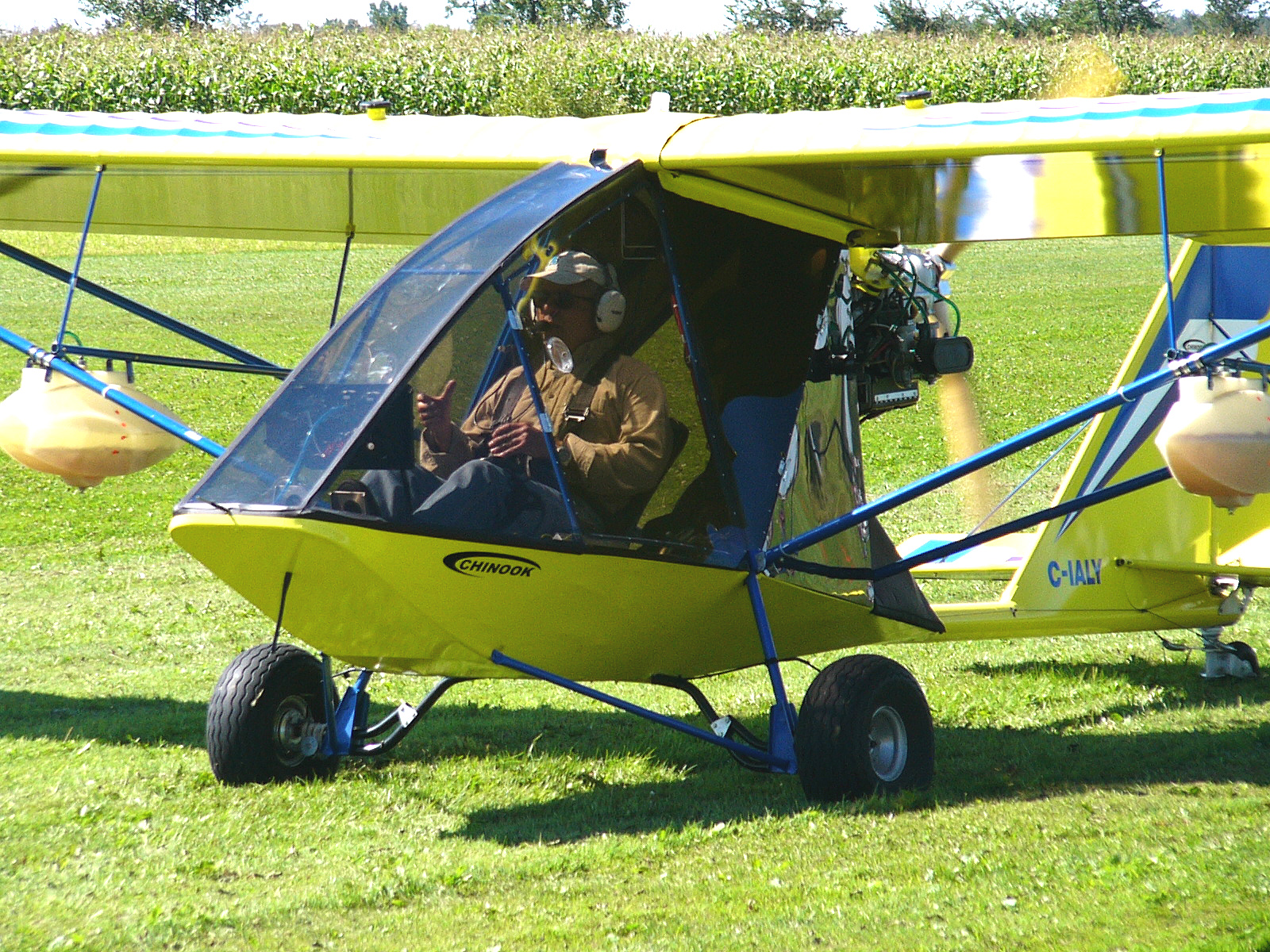
ASAP Chinook Plus 2

One of the owners of a Chinook 2S at the time Birdman Enterprises went out of business was Brent Holomis. Seeing the opportunity to step in and provide parts for the fleet he founded Aircraft Sales and Parts (ASAP) in 1988, in Vernon, British Columbia. Initially ASAP concentrated on supplying parts, but with assistance from the University of Alberta, Holomis redesigned the aircraft. The new model, a two-seater introduced in 1989 was designated the Chinook Plus 2 and incorporated an all new wing of reduced span (32 ft (10 m) versus the 2S's 37 ft (11 m)) and lower aspect ratio with a greater number of ribs and covered with Ceconite in place of untreated Dacron. The wing features flaperons. The new model has a completely new landing gear and many other improvements over the 2S and was built by Canadian Ultralight Manufacturing, which ASAP acquired. The Plus 2 retains the strut-mounted fuel tanks introduced on the 2S.

The Chinook Plus 2 is available in kit form with a large number of engine options, including the 50 hp (37 kW) Rotax 503, the four-stroke 60 hp (45 kW) HKS 700E, the 64 hp (48 kW) Rotax 582 and the 80 hp (60 kW) Rotax 912. The heavier engines, particularly the Rotax 912, have been noted as changing the aircraft's handling characteristics and making the aircraft less stable in pitch and yaw.

The Chinook Plus 2 [with the 912 engine] is definitely not a beginner's airplane and [ASAP factory demonstration pilot] Larry [Williams] reports that students take quite a bit of extra time to adapt to its handling. The plane is very responsive to control inputs and exhibits close to neutral static stability in roll. The pitch and yaw axes both exhibit notable negative static stability and the aircraft likes to diverge from straight and level flight in both pitch and yaw. It isn't hard to control, and many aerobatic planes are similarly unstable, but it is an airplane that needs to be flown positively at all times and so would make a less than ideal trainer or plane for a low time pilot.

With the four-stroke HKS 700E engine, the Plus 2 has a top speed af 90 mph (145 km/h) and a high cruise of 80 mph (129 km/h), with a 65 mph (105 km/h) economy cruise, burning only about 2 US gal (8 L) per hour, giving a five-hour endurance with standard tanks. Solo power off stalls are 35 mph (56 km/h) and are "mild and uneventful". The aircraft has a very low power off sink rate of about 350 fpm (1.78 m/s).

The Plus 2 initially had a gross weight of 900 lb (408 kg), but this was progressively increased to its present 1,050 lb (476 kg).

Reviewer Dan Johnson, writing in EAA Sport Pilot & Light Sport Aircraft Magazine in January 2008, described the Chinook Plus 2 with the HKS 700E engine:

Though the Chinook's wide cockpit gives it a pudgy appearance from some vantage points, the design slips through the air quite well. It has light and powerful ailerons, which makes it easy to guide through the air. In general, the plane's handling is quite pleasant despite, or perhaps because of, its unorthodox shape.

The factory claimed that a first time builder can complete the Chinook Plus 2 in 220 hours of labour.

== Under Aeroplane Manufactory Management ==
The rights to the Chinook Plus 2 were sold to a US company, the Aeroplane Manufactory in 2013, which put the design back into production in 2016. Aeroplane Manufactory ("AM") is the trade name for the Early Aeroplane Manufactory LLC, a Texas limited liability company founded in 2003 and was based at Gloster Aerodrome (1XA7), near Houston, Texas. AM was owned and operated by John A. Couch and Kim S. Evans-Couch who also own and operate Gloster Aerodrome, LP. In the fall of 2013, AM purchased all of the assets of Aircraft Sales and Parts Ltd. based in Vernon, British Columbia and its affiliate, Canadian Ultralight Manufacturing Ltd. based in St. Paul, Alberta, together ("ASAP"). ASAP produced the Beaver and Chinook lines of light aircraft kits in Canada for over 25 years until its owners decided to retire from the business and liquidate the companies.

In November 2013, AM received consolidated shipments of parts, materials, equipment, tooling, jigs, inventory, machines, intellectual property, and records from two locations in Canada. These shipments comprised five eighteen-wheeler truckloads of assets. AM repurposed a large hangar at Gloster Aerodrome to accommodate the received assets from ASAP. The repurposing process took several months to complete.

The unpacking, counting, and computerization of existing inventory extended over additional months, with the installation and operationalization of machinery taking even longer. In early November 2014, upon completion of the facility and machinery setup, Glenn and Kurt Holomis from St. Paul visited Gloster Aerodrome to train the Couches on fabrication and assembly techniques.

As with many small businesses facing learning curves, the Couches worked to provide quality products at competitive prices, building upon the Holomis' established reputation. The company subsequently produced Chinook Plus 2 parts and developed full kits for the Chinook DR and Chinook SJ models.

=== Chinook DR ===
The Chinook DR was a variant of the Chinook Plus 2, featuring a Dan Reynolds designed (DR) Landing Gear System. It was equipped with standard 5-gallon strut tanks and a metalized fuselage. The aircraft could be modified to include optional in-wing 10-gallon aluminum tanks.

The Chinook DR aircraft kit was offered in two versions: one compatible with the 2-stroke Rotax 582UL engine, and another designed for the 4-stroke Rotax 912UL engine. The kit provided components necessary for aircraft assembly, excluding the engine, engine accessories, propeller, and paint.

This aircraft was noted for its short takeoff and landing (STOL) capabilities.

=== Chinook SJ ===
The Chinook SJ was a significantly modified version of the Chinook DR. It featured an extended body tube and an enlarged rear fuselage, which allowed for a larger door and increased passenger or flight instructor space. The front cabin was taller than previous Chinook models and included lighter, larger aluminum seats.

Modifications to the Chinook SJ included:

- Increased surface area for flaperons, elevator, and rudder
- Strengthened wings, jury struts, and lift struts to increase useful load
- A larger tailwheel compared to other Chinook models
- Two 10-gallon internal aluminum wing tanks as standard, with the option to install both strut and in-wing tanks per customer request
- Optional dihedral for improved stability in low-speed flight regimes

The Chinook SJ aircraft kit was available in two versions: one compatible with the 2-stroke Rotax 582UL engine, and another designed for the 4-stroke Rotax 912UL engine. The kit provided components necessary for aircraft assembly, excluding the engine, engine accessories, propeller, and paint.

This model was designed to withstand the demands of flight training and extreme bush flying conditions.

== Under Legacy AIR1 Management ==
In August 2023, the Aeroplane Manufactory, including all inventory and product rights, was sold to fellow Texas-based company Legacy AIR1 (Formerly Legacy Light Sport Group (LSG)). They are modernizing and upgrading the aircraft kit with factory and custom-designed parts at their facility in Plainview, TX at the Hale County Airport. The most recent update from the company states: "Since taking over the company, we have made significant progress in setting up our new manufacturing facility in Plainview, Texas. All of the necessary equipment, tools, and existing inventory have been moved to our two hangars, and we have nearly completed the process of organizing, inventorying, and labeling everything."

"While we have been making great strides, we also understand that producing a high-quality aircraft kit takes time. When the Couch family purchased the rights to the Chinook in 2013, it took them nearly three years to deliver their first aircraft. We are pleased to report that we are ahead of that schedule, but we also want to ensure that we deliver a product that meets our high standards and exceeds your expectations."

== Operational history ==
The Chinook WT-11 design won Reserve Grand Champion at AirVenture in 1983 and again in 1984.

In August 1983, test pilot Dennis Maland flew a WT-11 with the standard Rotax 277 engine to a height of 18,500 ft (5,639 m).

In November 1984, Jack Hughes flew a WT-11 across the width of Australia from Orange, New South Wales, to Perth, Western Australia, in 14 days and 49 flying hours, a distance of 2,050 nmi (3,800 km).

In 1993, a 64 hp (48 kW) Rotax 582-powered Chinook Plus 2 on skis and Full Lotus Floats was used by the National Geographic Society in filming a television special about marine mammals in the Canadian Arctic.

In 2018, Dan Reynolds, designer of the "DR" gear option for the Chinook DR line of aircraft broke the world record for shortest landing in the LSA class at the Valdez, Alaska STOL Competition. In 2020, the Yukon bush pilot came in second place, and with the shortest landing at the 2020 Lone Star STOL competition in Gainesville, Texas.

== Variants ==
Chinook WT-11-277
Single seat, powered by a 28 hp (21 kW) Rotax 277, produced by Birdman Enterprises 1983-1986.
Chinook WT-11-377
Single seat, powered by a 35 hp (26 kW) Rotax 377, produced by Birdman Enterprises 1984-1986.
Chinook 1S
Later designation for the WT-11, to align is nomenclature with the 2S. Single seat, powered by a 28 hp (21 kW) Rotax 277 or optionally a 35 hp (26 kW) Rotax 377, produced by Birdman Enterprises 1987.
Chinook 2S
Two seat, powered by a 42 hp (31 kW) Rotax 447 or 50 hp (37 kW) Rotax 503, produced by Birdman Enterprises 1984-1987.
Chinook Plus 2
Two seat, powered by a 50 hp (37 kW) Rotax 503, 60 hp (45 kW) HKS 700E, 64 hp (48 kW) Rotax 582 or 80 hp (60 kW) Rotax 912, produced by ASAP 1989-2013 and the parts were continued in production by Aeroplane Manufactory from 2016-2023.

Chinook DR

Factory-modified Chinook Plus 2 with the DR Landing Gear System, produced by Aeroplane Manufactory from 2016-2023. Production will resume in 2024 or 2025 under Legacy AIR1

Chinook SJ

Two seat, powered by a 2 stroke (Rotax 582UL) or 4 stroke (Rotax 912UL) Production will resume in 2024 under Legacy AIR1

== Specifications (Chinook WT-11) ==
Data from Jones

General characteristics

- Crew: one
- Capacity: one passenger
- Length: 17 ft 6 in (5.34 m)
- Wingspan: 35 ft 0 in (10.68 m)
- Height: 5 ft 10 in (1.78 m)
- Wing area: 140 sq ft (13.0 m^{2})
- Airfoil: University of Alberta UA 80/1
- Empty weight: 250 lb (113 kg)
- Max takeoff weight: 625 lb (283 kg)
- Powerplant: 1 × Rotax 277 , 28 hp (21 kW)
- Propellers: 4 ft 6 in (1.37 m) diameter

Performance

- Maximum speed: 60 mph (97 km/h, 52 kn)
- Cruise speed: 50 mph (81 km/h, 43 kn)
- Stall speed: 24 mph (39 km/h, 21 kn)
- Never exceed speed: 85 mph (138 km/h, 74 kn)
- Range: 200 mi (324 km, 170 nmi)
- Service ceiling: 15,000 ft (4,575 m)
- Rate of climb: 700 ft/min (3.6 m/s)
- Wing loading: 4.5 lb/sq ft (21.8 kg/m^{2})
- Power/mass: 22.3 lb/hp (0.07 kW/kg)
- Load factors: +6/-3 g

== See also ==
Aircraft of comparable role, configuration, and era

- CGS Hawk
- InterPlane Skyboy
- Lockwood Drifter
- Quad City Challenger
- Spectrum Beaver
