= Advanced Aeromarine Buccaneer =

American amphibious flying boat

Buccaneer
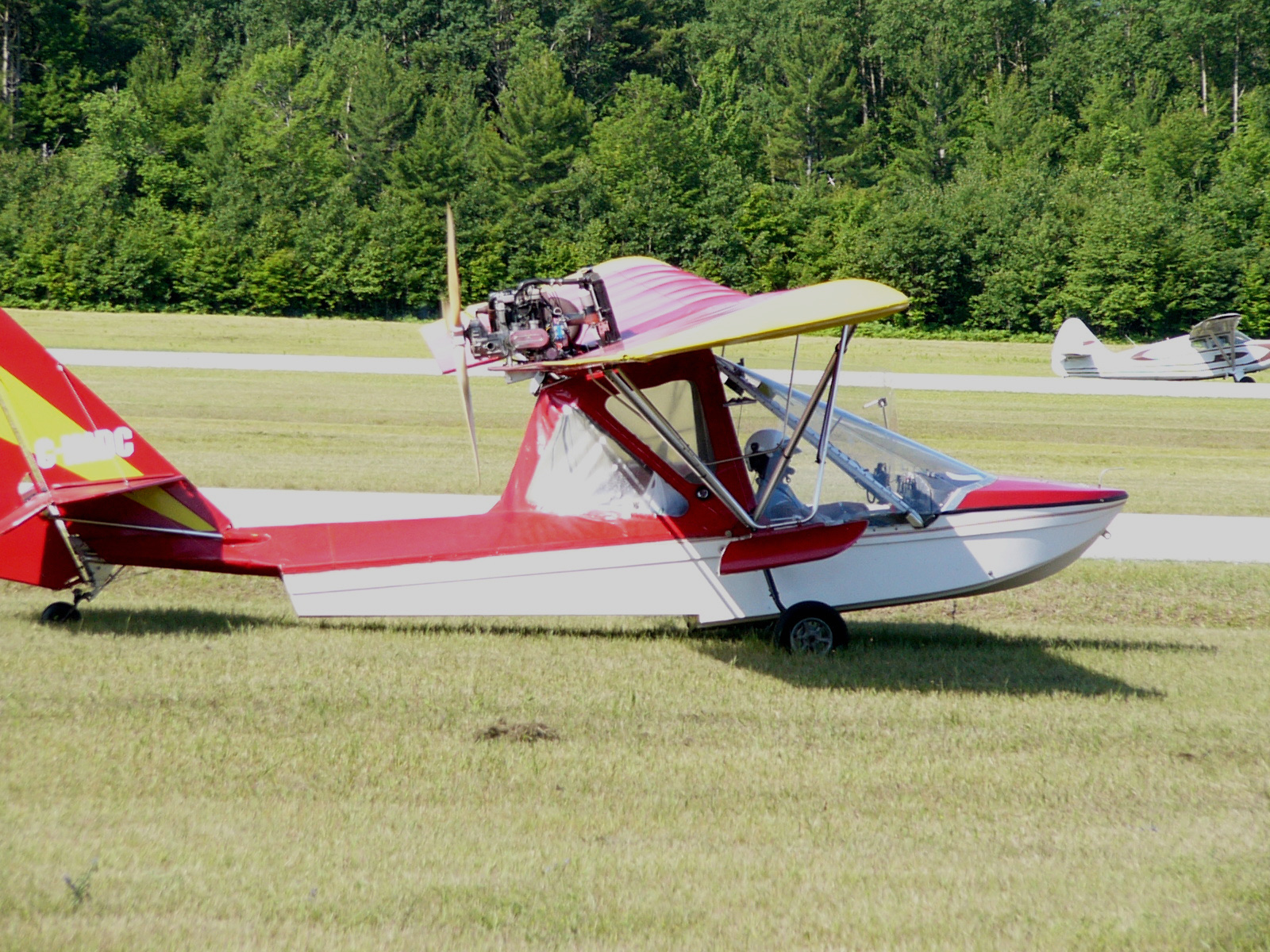
- Buccaneer II

General information
- Type: Ultralight flying boat
- Manufacturer: HighCraft AeroMarine; Advanced Aeromarine; Keuthan Aircraft; Arnet Pereyra Inc
- Status: no longer in production

History
- Introduction date: 1984 (Buccaneer XA)
- First flight: 1984
- Retired: 1998
- Variants: Arnet Pereyra Sabre II

The Buccaneer (also known in some of its many incarnations as the Mallard) is a one- or two-seat ultralight high-wing amphibious flying boat of pusher configuration marketed as a kit aircraft.

The aircraft was manufactured by a number of U.S. firms in slightly different forms, including Arnet Pereyra Inc, HighCraft AeroMarine, Advanced Aviation and Keuthan Aircraft.

== Development ==
The original single-seat model Buccaneer XA was introduced in 1984 and qualified for the US FAR 103 Ultralight Vehicle category. The aircraft was commercial success and sold well until being replaced by the Buccaneer SX in 1988. The SX remained available on the market until general production ended in 1998, although in 2001 the model was still available as a special order from Aero Adventure Aviation. The SX was replaced by the improved derivative Aero Adventure Aventura UL and HP single seaters.

The Buccaneer II was a two-seat side-by-side configuration model introduced in 1988 and intended as an ultralight trainer. This model was replaced by the Aero Adventure Aventura II, which is an improved model developed from the Buccaneer II.

== Design ==
The original XA model is constructed from bolted together anodized aluminum tubing, with a fiberglass hull. The wire-braced wing is supported by a king post and is of aluminum structure, covered with pre-sewn Dacron covers. The wing features 2/3 span ailerons and no flaps. The tail wheel is retractable via a cable control, while the main landing gear is removed by the pilot in flight and stowed in the cockpit for landing on water after a land take-off.

The model SX was introduced to provide incremental design improvements over the XA. Primarily the SX eliminated the cable-bracing and replaced it with V-struts featuring jury struts. The wings feature full-span ailerons. The fuselage was completely redesigned and features a new hull shape that can better handle higher wave conditions. The landing gear can be pivoted up for water landings, rather than removed.

The Buccaneer II is similar to the SX, but with a wider hull to accommodate two seats, in side-by-side configuration. The ailerons are 2/3 span. The landing gear is repositioned by a lever control and moves the tailwheel in concert with the main wheels. The main gear includes mechanical brakes.

== Operational use ==
The original model XA remains popular on the used aircraft market and aircraft for sale command high prices. Long operational use and the rigours of land and water operation have resulted in weak points in the design being identified as many older aircraft have suffered from bent wing trailing edges, wing root tube brackets, flying wire shackles and tail boom tubes. Cracked aft vertical stabilizer tubes and main bulkheads are also common. All of these deficiencies can be repaired in used aircraft.

== Variants ==
Buccaneer XA
Single seat, wired-braced Part 103 ultralight flying boat. Engines available were the 28 hp (21 kW) Rotax 277 and the 35 hp (26 kW) Rotax 377.
Buccaneer SX
Single seat, strut-braced flying boat. Engines available were the 40 hp (30 kW) Rotax 447 and the 50 hp (37 kW) Rotax 503.
Buccaneer II
Two seat, strut-braced flying boat. Engines available were the 64 hp (48 kW) Rotax 582 and the 80 hp (60 kW) Rotax 912.
Mallard M2-A
Extensively modified Buccaneer, with the wing lowered. Was sold as a modification package and as a complete kit.

== Specifications (Buccaneer XA) ==
General characteristics

- Wingspan: 33 ft 6 in (10.21 m)
- Wing area: 162 sq ft (15.1 m^{2})
- Empty weight: 325 lb (147 kg)
- Gross weight: 1,235 lb (560 kg)
- Powerplant: 1 × Rotax 277 2-stroke air-cooled piston engine, 27 hp (20 kW)

Performance

- Maximum speed: 75 mph (121 km/h, 65 kn)

== See also ==
Related development

- Advanced Aeromarine Carrera
- Aero Adventure Aventura
