= Worldwide Ultralite =

American aircraft manufacturer

Worldwide Ultralite Industries
- Company type: Privately held company
- Industry: Aerospace
- Founded: 1980s
- Defunct: 1990s
- Headquarters: United States
- Products: Kit aircraft

Worldwide Ultralite Industries was an American aircraft manufacturer. The company specialized in the design and manufacture of ultralight aircraft in the form of kits for amateur construction and ready-to-fly aircraft in the US FAR 103 Ultralight Vehicles rules. Formed in the early 1980s, the company was out of business by the 1990s.

The company produced three simple ultralight designs, the Worldwide Ultralite Clipper, the Worldwide Ultralite Skyraider S/S and the Worldwide Ultralite Spitfire, which was derived from the Phantom X1. After the demise of Worldwide Ultralite, the Spitfire design was produced by Don Ecker and later Air Magic Ultralights of Houston, Texas

Worldwide Ultralite was noted for its marketing of the aircraft at trade shows, such as EAA AirVenture. They employed scantily-clad models to attract attention to the aircraft, a tactic not normally employed at aircraft trade shows.

== Aircraft ==
Summary of aircraft built by
Model name	First flight	Number built	Type
Worldwide Ultralite Clipper	early 1980s		Single seat ultralight aircraft
Worldwide Ultralite Skyraider S/S	early 1980s		Single seat ultralight aircraft
Worldwide Ultralite Spitfire	1980s		Single seat ultralight aircraft
