= Advanced Aeromarine Carrera =

Ultralight aircraft

Carrera

General information
- Type: Homebuilt ultralight aircraft
- Manufacturer: Advanced Aeromarine; Advanced Aviation; Arnet Pereyra Inc

History
- First flight: 1990s
- Variant: Arnet Pereyra Sabre II

The Carrera is a two-seat ultralight aircraft marketed for home building. Designed by Advanced Aeromarine, it has also been marketed by Advanced Aviation and Arnet Pereyra Inc. It is a high-wing taildragger aircraft of pusher configuration with side-by-side seating. It is of fabric-covered tubular construction.

The aircraft was later marketed by Keuthan Aircraft as the Sabre and developed into the two-place Sabre II.

== Specifications (Carrera 180) ==
Data from

General characteristics

- Crew: 1
- Capacity: 2
- Length: 22 ft 2 in (6.76 m)
- Wingspan: 31 ft 3 in (9.52 m)
- Height: 6 ft 10 in (2.08 m)
- Wing area: 152 sq ft (14.12 m^{2})
- Empty weight: 410 lb (186 kg)
- Gross weight: 950 lb (431 kg)
- Powerplant: 1 × Rotax 582 , 65 hp (48.5 kW)

Performance

- Maximum speed: 75 mph (121 km/h, 65 kn)
- Cruise speed: 63 mph (101 km/h, 55 kn)
- Stall speed: 31 mph (50 km/h, 27 kn)
- Service ceiling: 12,000 ft (3,658 m)
- Rate of climb: 650 ft/min (3.0 m/s)

== See also ==
Related development

- Keuthan Sabre
