= Sky Raider =

Sky Raider or Skyraider may refer to:

== Aircraft ==
- Douglas A-1 Skyraider, a 1945 American attack aircraft
- Flying K Sky Raider, a 1996 American ultralight aircraft
- Worldwide Ultralite Skyraider S/S, a 1980s American ultralight aircraft
- L3Harris OA-1K Skyraider II, a 2025 American attack aircraft

== Entertainment ==
- Sky Raider, a 1978 arcade game by Atari, Inc., see List of Atari, Inc. games (1972–1984)

== See also ==
- Sky Raiders, a 1941 film
