= Advanced Aeromarine =

American aircraft manufacturer

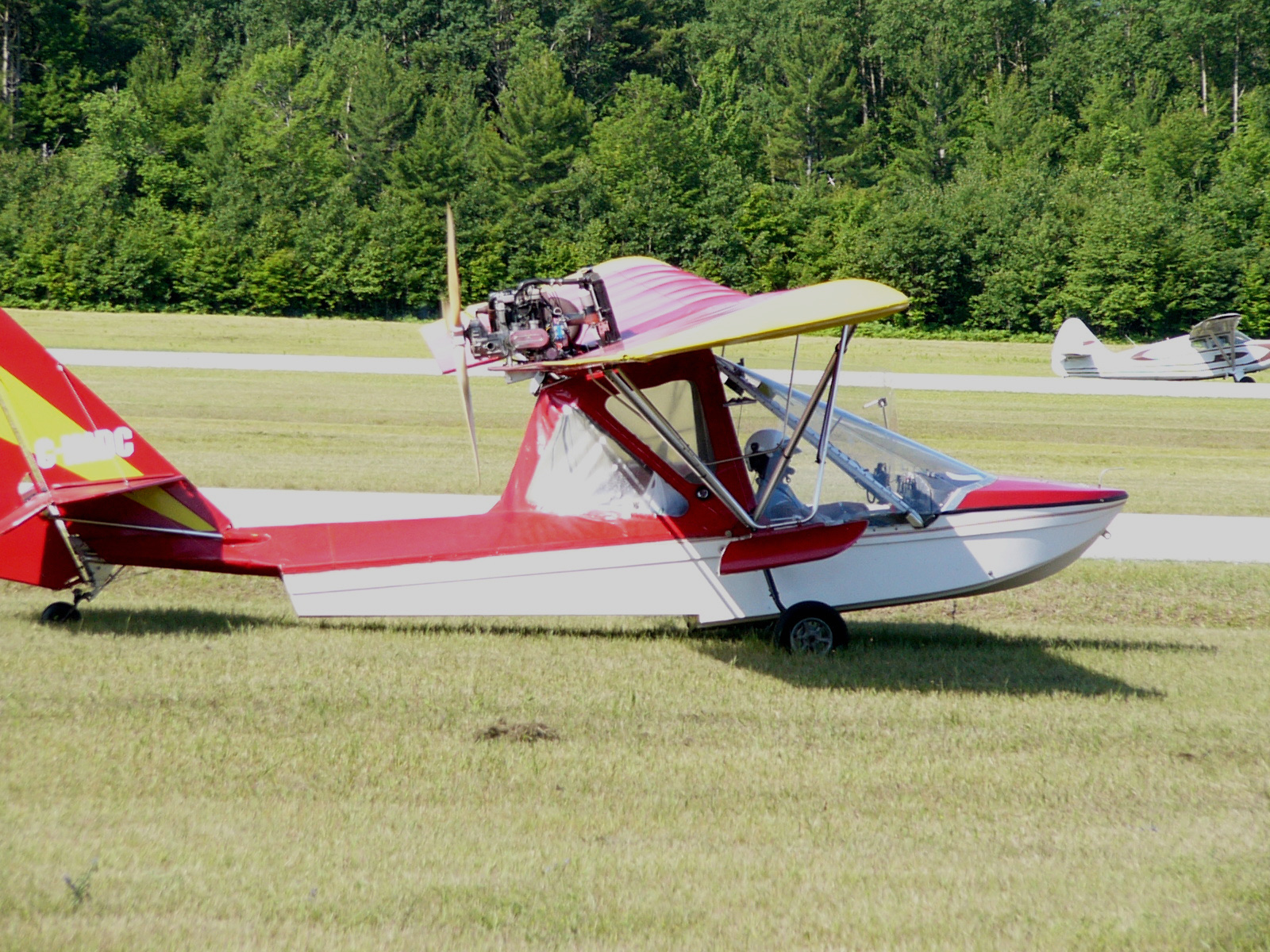
Buccaneer II

Advanced Aeromarine (later HighCraft AeroMarine) was an aircraft manufacturer based in Ocoee, Florida. It built light aircraft, amphibious aircraft and sailplanes, developing a number of successful designs that have been produced by a number of different firms over the years.

Aeromarine designs were licensed to Advanced Aviation for some time before being acquired by Keuthan Aircraft.

== List of aircraft ==
- Advanced Aeromarine Buccaneer, 1980s single-engine two-seat amphibious ultralight. High-wing pusher configuration
- Advanced Aeromarine Carrera, 1990s single-engine two-seat ultralight. High-wing pusher configuration
- Advanced Aeromarine Sierra, 1990s sailplane. Pod and boom configuration
- Advanced Aeromarine Mallard
