= BB Microlight =

- Company type: Privately held company
- Industry: Aerospace
- Products: Ultralight trikes
- Website: www.trike.hu

BB Microlight is a Hungarian aircraft manufacturer based in Baja, Hungary. The company specializes in the design and manufacture of ultralight trikes and wings for trikes.

The company's aircraft have won many championships including the European Champion, Britain, 1994; the World Champion, South Africa, 1996; the First World Air Games Champion, Turkey, 1997; World Cup Championships, Hungary, 1998; World Champion, Hungary 1999; World Champion Team, Hungary 1999; as well as seven other medals earned at International Championships.

BB Microlight works closely with their US distributor, Manta Aircraft, to develop products. In the US their carriages are usually fitted with Manta RST wings in place of the BB supplied wings used in European sales. BB Microlight builds the BB-01 Bence, BB-02 Serpa and the BB-03 Trya trike wings.

Much of the company design work is done in consultation with Hungarian competition pilots with the aim of producing competition aircraft.

== Aircraft ==
Summary of aircraft built by BB Microlight
Model name	First flight	Number built	Type
BB Microlight BB-two seater			Two seat ultralight trike
BB Microlight BB-one seater			single seat ultralight trike
BB Microlight 103			single seat ultralight trike
