= Worldwide Ultralite Spitfire =

American ultralight aircraft

Spitfire

General information
- Type: Ultralight aircraft
- National origin: United States
- Manufacturer: Worldwide Ultralite; Don Ecker; Air Magic Ultralights
- Designer: Fred Bell
- Status: Production completed
- Number built: 514 (Spitfire, 1998); 68 (Spitfire II, 1998)

History
- Developed from: Bell Sidewinder; Phantom X1

The Worldwide Ultralite Spitfire is an American ultralight aircraft that was designed by Fred Bell and manufactured by Worldwide Ultralite Industries and later by Don Ecker and Air Magic Ultralights of Houston, Texas. The aircraft was supplied as a kit for amateur construction.

== Design and development ==
The Spitfire is a derivative of the Phantom X1 that was created by former Phantom Aeronautics employee Fred Bell, who also designed the Bell Sidewinder. The Spitfire was designed to comply with the US FAR 103 Ultralight Vehicles rules, including the category's maximum empty weight of 254 lb (115 kg). The aircraft has a standard empty weight of 253 lb (115 kg). It features a strut-braced high-wing, a single-seat, open cockpit, tricycle landing gear and a single engine in tractor configuration.

The aircraft is made from bolted-together aluminum tubing, with the flying surfaces covered in Dacron sailcloth. The Spitfire differs from the X1 in having flaps, struts in place of cable-bracing, a centre stick and a cog-belt reduction drive. Its 30 ft (9.1 m) span wing is supported by "V" struts and jury struts. The pilot is accommodated on an open seat, partially enclosed by a fibreglass fairing with a windshield. The standard engine initially provided was the Kawasaki 440 snowmobile powerplant of 36 hp (27 kW).

The design pushes the empty weight limits set by FAR 103 and thus has to be built carefully and cannot be fitted with options if it is to be legally flown in this category.

A two-seat version in side-by-side configuration was also produced by Air Magic Ultralights. Powered by a Rotax 503 two-stroke powerplant of 50 hp (37 kW), it has a gross weight of 800 lb (363 kg).

== Variants ==
Spitfire
Single seat version powered by a 40 hp (30 kW) Rotax 447 engine. It was offered in Ultralight and Super Sport configurations, with the latter having a larger engine, more instruments, sprung steel landing gear, an auxiliary fuel tank and wheel pants.
Spitfire II
Two seats in side-by-side configuration version powered by a 50 hp (37 kW) Rotax 503 engine. It was offered in an Elite configuration that included bucket seats, a larger engine and a 10 U.S. gallons (38 L; 8.3 imp gal) fuel tank.

== Specifications (Spitfire) ==
Data from Cliche and the Virtual Ultralight Museum

General characteristics

- Crew: one
- Length: 18 ft 4 in (5.59 m)
- Wingspan: 30 ft 0 in (9.14 m)
- Height: 7 ft 8 in (2.34 m)
- Wing area: 152 sq ft (14.1 m^{2})
- Empty weight: 253 lb (115 kg)
- Gross weight: 550 lb (249 kg)
- Fuel capacity: 5 U.S. gallons (19 L; 4.2 imp gal)
- Powerplant: 1 × Kawasaki 440 twin cylinder, two-stroke snowmobile engine, with a cog-belt reduction drive, 36 hp (27 kW)

Performance

- Maximum speed: 63 mph (101 km/h, 55 kn)
- Cruise speed: 55 mph (89 km/h, 48 kn)
- Stall speed: 20 mph (32 km/h, 17 kn)
- Range: 100 mi (160 km, 87 nmi)
- g limits: +9/-6
- Maximum glide ratio: 8:1
- Rate of climb: 600 ft/min (3.0 m/s)
- Wing loading: 3.61 lb/sq ft (17.6 kg/m^{2})

== See also ==
Related development

- Bell Sidewinder
