= Star Streak =

Star Streak may refer to:

- StarStreak, a variant of the CFM Shadow, a British ultralight aircraft
- Starstreak, a British short-range man-portable air-defence system
