= Sport Flight Talon =

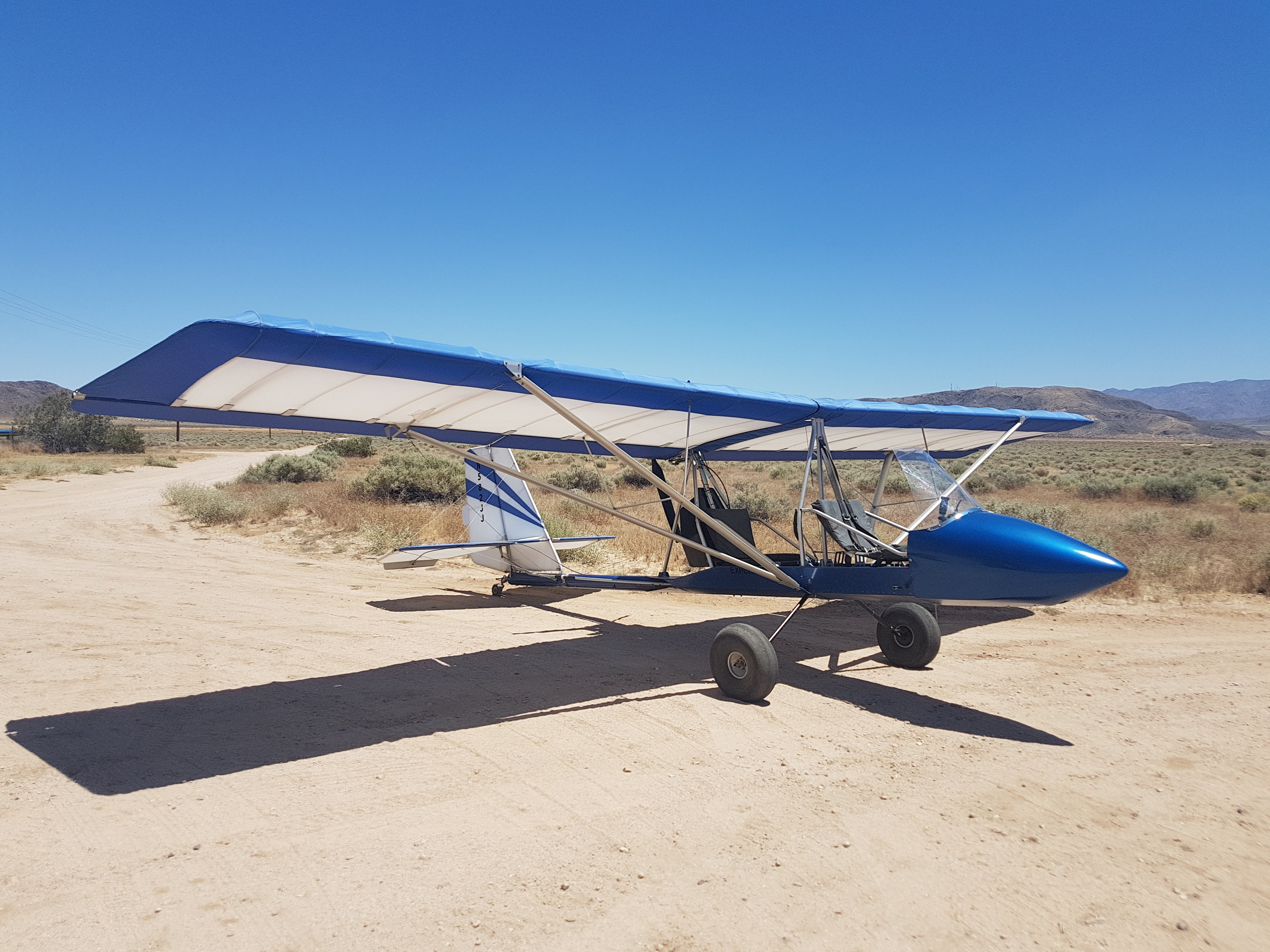
- Talon XP

General information
- Type: Kit aircraft
- National origin: United States
- Manufacturer: Sport Flight Aviation
- Status: Production completed

History
- Introduction date: 1989
- Developed from: Maxair Drifter
- Variant: Advanced Aviation Explorer

The Sport Flight Talon is a high-wing, pusher configuration single-engine, conventional landing gear homebuilt aircraft or ultralight aircraft, that was produced by Sport Flight Aviation of Sandy, Oregon in kit form for amateur construction.

The aircraft is no longer offered on the company website and seems to be out of production.

== Design and development ==
The Talon was developed from the Maxair Drifter and introduced into the market in 1989. The aircraft shares the Drifter's main fuselage tube, used as the aircraft's spine. The rudder pedals attach to the front of the tube, the seat and wing support structure to the center and the tail to the rear of the tube. The main improvements over the original Drifter include strut-braced wings with jury struts, flaps, streamlined baggage area, optional enclosed cockpit, wheel pants and brakes. The addition of many options and extras over the basic Drifter design means that the Talon cannot be constructed in the US FAR 103 Ultralight Vehicles category, due to exceeding the maximum 254 lb (115 kg) category empty weight and must instead be registered as a homebuilt aircraft in the USA. In other countries, such as Canada, the Talon fits the ultralight or microlight aircraft category.

The aircraft's structure is made from 6061-T6 aluminum, with the main landing gear struts of 4130 steel. The aluminum frame wing is covered in pre-sewn Dacron envelopes. Construction time from the kit is reported as 120 hours.

The basic Talon design has been developed into a series of single and tandem two seaters, with varying powerplants.

== Variants ==
Talon Magnum
Single seat model, power range 40 to 70 hp (30 to 52 kW), standard engine HKS 700E of 60 hp (45 kW). Optional engines include the 40 hp (30 kW) Rotax 447, the 50 hp (37 kW) Rotax 503 and the 64 hp (48 kW) Rotax 582. Twenty had been constructed by December 2007.
Talon XP
Two-seats-in-tandem model, power range 40 to 80 hp (30 to 60 kW), standard engine HKS 700E of 60 hp (45 kW). Optional engines include the 40 hp (30 kW) Rotax 447, the 50 hp (37 kW) Rotax 503 and the 64 hp (48 kW) Rotax 582. This model has an increased wingspan of 28.5 ft (8.69 m). Seventy had been constructed by December 2007.
Talon Super Magnum
Single model, standard engine Rotax 582 of 64 hp (48 kW), with the 40 hp (30 kW) Rotax 447 or the 50 hp (37 kW) Rotax 503 optional. This model is the XP model with the rear seat area converted into additional baggage space. It has an increased wingspan of 28.5 ft (8.69 m). Fits the FAI microlight class.
Talon Typhoon
Single seat aerobatic model.

== Specifications (Talon XP) ==
Data from Talon XP Preliminary Assembly Manual

General characteristics

- Crew: one
- Capacity: one passenger
- Length: 21 ft 7 in (6.58 m)
- Wingspan: 28 ft 10 in (8.79 m)
- Wing area: 146 sq ft (13.6 m^{2})
- Empty weight: 555 lb (252 kg)
- Gross weight: 1,000 lb (454 kg)
- Fuel capacity: 10.5 US Gallons (39.5 litres)
- Powerplant: 1 × Rotax 582UL two stroke aircraft engine, 64 hp (48 kW)
- Propellers: 3-bladed ground adjustable

Performance

- Cruise speed: 65 mph (105 km/h, 56 kn)
- Stall speed: 37 mph (60 km/h, 32 kn)
- Never exceed speed: 90 mph (140 km/h, 78 kn)
- Range: 130 mi (210 km, 110 nmi)
- Rate of climb: 900 ft/min (4.6 m/s)
