= Cosmik Chaser =

British ultralight trike

Chaser

General information
- Type: Ultralight trike
- National origin: United Kingdom
- Manufacturer: Cosmik Aviation
- Designer: Nigel Beale
- Status: In production (2011)

History
- Introduction date: 1990s

The Cosmik Chaser is a British ultralight trike that was designed by Nigel Beale and is produced by Cosmik Aviation of Southam. The aircraft is supplied as a complete ready-to-fly-aircraft.

== Design and development ==
The Chaser was a competition trike that won dozens of international matches in the 1990s and then went out of production, as UK regulations changed. It was reintroduced circa 2010 as regulations were again altered, as a made-to-order and unadvertised product of the company.

The aircraft also complies with the American FAR 103 Ultralight Vehicles rules, including the category's maximum empty weight of 254 lb (115 kg).

The Chaser features a cable-braced hang glider-style high-wing, weight-shift controls, a single-seat open cockpit, tricycle landing gear and a single engine in pusher configuration.

The aircraft is made from bolted-together aluminum tubing, with its wing covered in Dacron sailcloth. Its 8.1 m (26.6 ft) span wing is supported by a single tube-type kingpost and uses an "A" frame weight-shift control bar. The powerplant is a twin cylinder, air-cooled, two-stroke, 40 hp (30 kW) Rotax 447 engine. The aircraft has an empty weight of 98 kg (216 lb) and the fuel tank holds 23 litres (5.1 imp gal; 6.1 US gal).

An updated model, called the Superchaser, was proposed.

== Specifications (Chaser) ==
Data from Bayerl

General characteristics

- Crew: one
- Wingspan: 8.1 m (26 ft 7 in)
- Wing area: 10.0 m^{2} (108 sq ft)
- Empty weight: 98 kg (216 lb)
- Fuel capacity: 23 litres (5.1 imp gal; 6.1 US gal)
- Powerplant: 1 × Rotax 447 twin cylinder, air-cooled, two stroke aircraft engine, 30 kW (40 hp)
- Propellers: 2-bladed wooden

Performance

- Maximum speed: 120 km/h (75 mph, 65 kn)
- Cruise speed: 96 km/h (60 mph, 52 kn)
- Stall speed: 55 km/h (34 mph, 30 kn)
- Rate of climb: 5.1 m/s (1,000 ft/min)
