= Ultracraft Calypso =

Belgian homebuilt ultralight aircraft

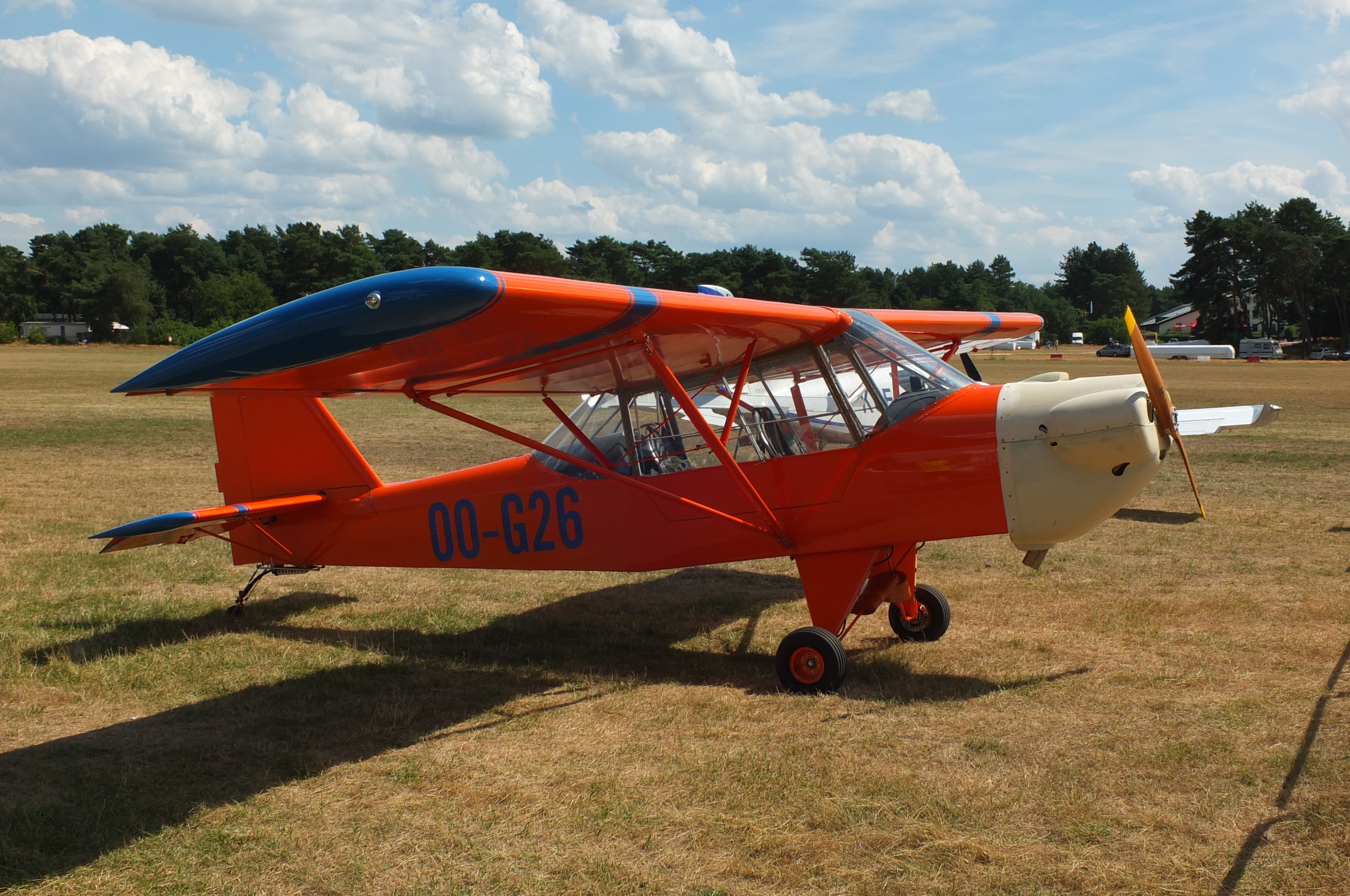
- Calypso 2A

General information
- Type: Homebuilt aircraft
- National origin: Belgium
- Manufacturer: Ultracraft
- Status: In production (2014)

History
- Introduction date: 1990s

The Ultracraft Calypso is a family of Belgian homebuilt aircraft designed and produced by Ultracraft of Heusden-Zolder, introduced in the 1990s. The aircraft is supplied as a complete ready-to-fly aircraft or as a kit for amateur construction.

== Design and development ==
The Calypso line all feature a strut-braced high wing, fixed conventional landing gear with optional wheel pants and a single engine in tractor configuration.

The single-seat Calypso 1 is made from a combination of wood and metal with its flying surfaces covered in doped aircraft fabric and a fibreglass cowling. Its 8.84 m (29.0 ft) span wing has a wing area of 11.6 m^{2} (125 sq ft) and is supported by "V" struts and jury struts. The cabin width is 61 cm (24 in). The acceptable power range is 40 to 65 hp (30 to 48 kW) and the standard engines used are the 40 hp (30 kW) Rotax 447 or the 50 hp (37 kW) Rotax 503 two-stroke powerplants.

The Calypso 1A has a typical empty weight of 155 kg (342 lb) and a gross weight of 285 kg (628 lb), giving a useful load of 130 kg (290 lb). With full fuel of 40 litres (8.8 imp gal; 11 US gal) the payload for the pilot and baggage is 103 kg (227 lb).

The standard day, sea level, no wind, takeoff with a 40 hp (30 kW) engine is 61 m (200 ft) and the landing roll is 46 m (151 ft).

The manufacturer estimates the construction time for the Calypso 1A from the supplied kit to be 300 hours.

== Operational history ==
By 1998 the company reported that 12 kits had been sold and five Calypso 1s were completed and flying.

== Variants ==
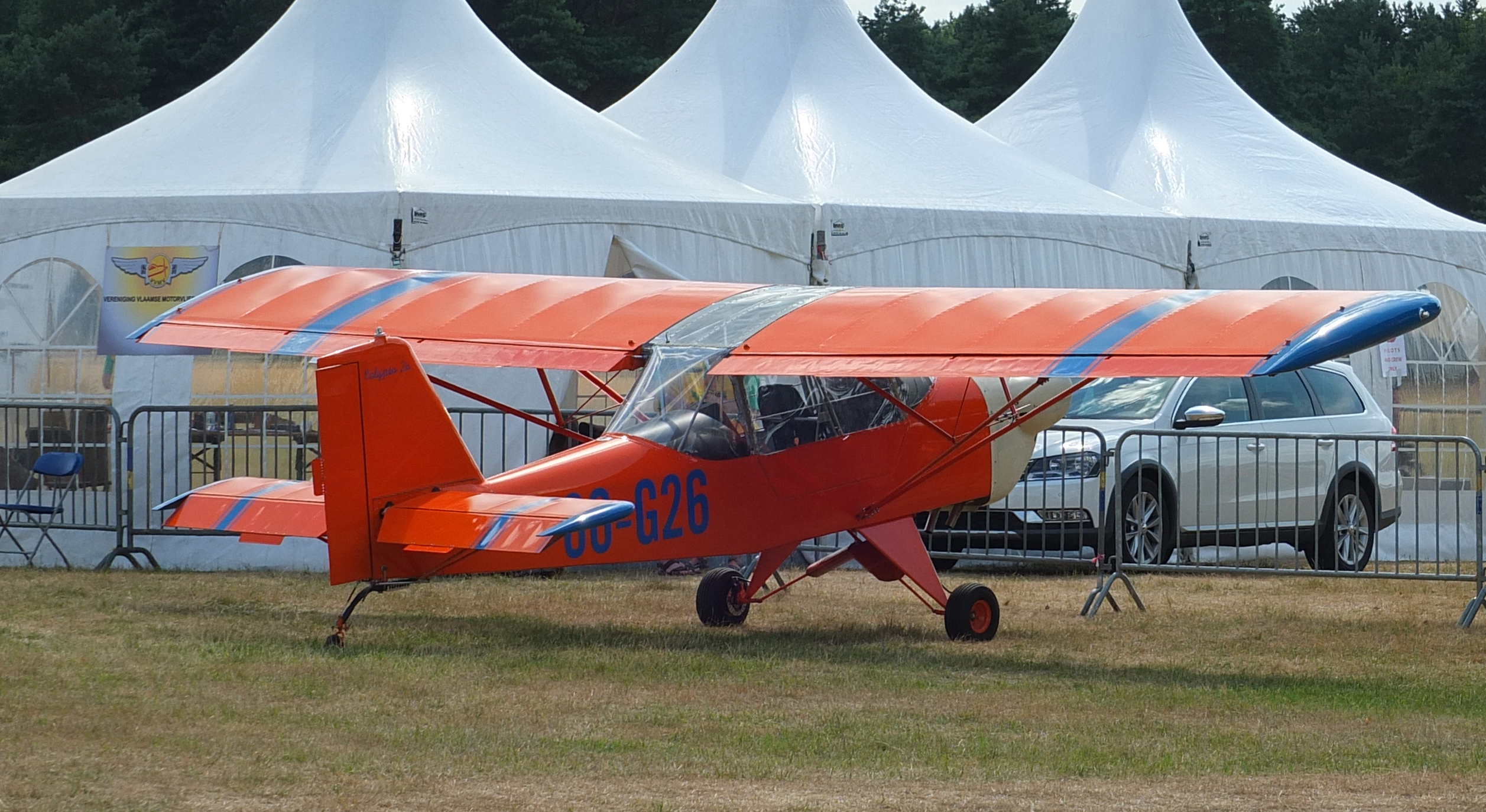
Calypso 2A

Calypso 1A
Initial version, single-seat with 40 to 65 hp (30 to 48 kW) engine.
Calypso 1B
Single-seat version with Citroën Visa automotive conversion engine or 65 hp (48 kW) Rotax 582 two-stroke, liquid-cooled powerplant.
Calypso 2A
Two-seat version with a wingspan of 9.05 m (29.7 ft) and a wing area of 15 m^{2} (160 sq ft), powered by a 65 hp (48 kW) Rotax 582 aircraft engine or a BMW automotive conversion engine. The 2A was designed to comply with the Fédération Aéronautique Internationale microlight category, including the category's maximum gross weight of 450 kg (992 lb). The aircraft has a maximum gross weight of 450 kg (992 lb).
Calypso 2B
Two-seat version with a wingspan of 8.05 m (26.4 ft) and a wing area of 13.4 m^{2} (144 sq ft), powered by an 85 hp (63 kW) Jabiru 2200 aircraft engine or a BMW automotive conversion engine. The 2B was designed to comply with the Fédération Aéronautique Internationale microlight category, including the category's maximum gross weight of 450 kg (992 lb). The aircraft has a maximum gross weight of 450 kg (992 lb).

== Specifications (Calypso 1A) ==
Data from Ultracraft

General characteristics

- Crew: one
- Capacity: one passenger
- Length: 5.5 m (18 ft 1 in)
- Wingspan: 8.65 m (28 ft 5 in)
- Wing area: 11.6 m^{2} (125 sq ft)
- Empty weight: 155 kg (342 lb)
- Gross weight: 285 kg (628 lb)
- Fuel capacity: 40 litres (8.8 imp gal; 11 US gal)
- Powerplant: 1 × Rotax 447 twin cylinder, air-cooled, two stroke aircraft engine, 30 kW (40 hp)
- Propellers: 2-bladed wooden, fixed pitch

Performance

- Cruise speed: 120 km/h (75 mph, 65 kn)
- Stall speed: 58 km/h (36 mph, 31 kn)
- Never exceed speed: 155 km/h (96 mph, 84 kn)
- g limits: +4/-2
- Maximum glide ratio: 11:1
- Rate of climb: 6 m/s (1,200 ft/min)
- Wing loading: 25 kg/m^{2} (5.1 lb/sq ft)
