= Aero Adventure Pegasus =

Type of aircraft

Pegasus

General information
- Type: Light utility aircraft
- National origin: United States
- Manufacturer: Aero Adventure Aviation

The Aero Adventure Pegasus is a small civil utility aircraft currently under development in the United States for sale as a kitplane. Of conventional monoplane configuration and composite construction, the Pegasus will seat its pilot and passenger in tandem and be available with a choice of two different wings, a longer wing for extended range, and a shorter wing for increased maneuverability.

== Specifications (as designed, long wing) ==
General characteristics

- Crew: 1
- Capacity: 1 passenger
- Length: 20 ft 0 in (6.09 m)
- Wingspan: 23 ft 0 in (7.01 m)
- Height: 8 ft 0 in (2.44 m)
- Wing area: 62 sq ft (5.8 m^{2})
- Empty weight: 400 lb (181 kg)
- Gross weight: 2,756 lb (1,250 kg)
- Powerplant: 1 × Rotax 914 4-cylinder air-cooled horizontally-opposed piston engine, 115 hp (86 kW)

Performance

- Maximum speed: 248 kn (285 mph, 459 km/h)
- Range: 1,900 nmi (2,200 mi, 3,500 km)
- Service ceiling: 20,000 ft (6,100 m)
- Rate of climb: 800.6 ft/min (4.067 m/s)
