= Freewing Scorpion =

Scorpion

General information
- Type: Reconnaissance UAV
- National origin: United States
- Manufacturer: Freewing

The Freewing Scorpion is a reconnaissance UAV of the United States, developed in the early 21st century by Freewing Aerial Robotics Corpation, associated with the University of Maryland, College Park. Working with well-known small-aircraft designer Burt Rutan, Freewing designed a series of piston-powered short-takeoff-and-landing UAVs, based on a design where the fuselage pivots relative to the wing surfaces. The "freewing" design also allows the UAV to operate as a stable observation platform during turbulent conditions.

The Scorpion will be offered for a US Army short-range UAV requirement, and is being proposed by Matra of France for use on French navy frigates and patrol boats. The Matra version is named "Marvel" and will carry a Matra-designed electro-optical day-night camera system initially, but the French navy has expressed interest in extending the payload to include communications relay, electronic warfare, and antisubmarine warfare equipment. Freewing is also offering the similar but smaller "Scorpiette", with a payload of up to 6.8 kilograms (15 pounds) for commercial, third-world militaries, and law enforcement organizations.

== Specifications (Scorpion 100) ==
General characteristics

- Crew: Unmanned
- Capacity: 50 lb (23 kg) payload
- Length: 11 ft 10 in (3.60 m)
- Wingspan: 16 ft 0 in (4.9 m)
- Powerplant: 1 × Rotax 447 , 52 hp (39 kW)

Performance

- Maximum speed: 146 mph (235 km/h, 127 kn)
- Endurance: 5 hours
- Service ceiling: 15,000 ft (4,600 m)
