= Advanced Aviation Cobra =

American ultralight aircraft

Cobra

General information
- Type: Homebuilt ultralight aircraft
- Manufacturer: Advanced Aviation

History
- First flight: 1980s
- Developed from: Eipper Quicksilver

The Advanced Aviation Cobra was a U.S. ultralight aircraft of extremely minimalist design marketed for homebuilding, developed from the Advanced Aviation Husky. The pilot is seated in an open framework suspended beneath a fabric-covered wing on which the engine (adapted from a snowmobile) and pusher propeller are also mounted. Early Cobras (Model A) had spoilers for roll control, while the Model B had traditional full three-axis control using ailerons. A two-seat training version, known as the King Cobra was also available.

== Specifications (Model B) ==
Data from Cliche

General characteristics

- Crew: one
- Wingspan: 35 ft (11 m)
- Wing area: 152 sq ft (14.1 m^{2})
- Empty weight: 235 lb (107 kg)
- Gross weight: 525 lb (238 kg)
- Fuel capacity: 4.8 U.S. gallons (18 L; 4.0 imp gal)
- Powerplant: 1 × Cuyuna 430R twin cylinder, two-stroke engine with reduction drive, 30 hp (22 kW)

Performance

- Maximum speed: 65 mph (105 km/h, 56 kn)
- Cruise speed: 55 mph (89 km/h, 48 kn)
- Stall speed: 24 mph (39 km/h, 21 kn)
- Range: 130 mi (210 km, 110 nmi)
- Service ceiling: 9,900 ft (3,000 m)
- Maximum glide ratio: 9:1
- Rate of climb: 1,000 ft/min (5.1 m/s)
