= Advanced Aviation =

American ultralight aircraft kit manufacturer

Advanced Aviation was a manufacturer of ultralight aircraft in kit form based in Orlando, Florida. It marketed designs by HighCraft AeroMarine under licence.

== Aircraft types ==
Advanced Aviation Husky
(1970s) single-engine single-seat weight shift ultralight aircraft. High-wing pusher configuration
Advanced Aviation Coyote
(1970s) single-engine single-seat weight shift ultralight aircraft. High-wing pusher configuration
Advanced Aviation Buccaneer
(1980s) single-engine two-seat ultralight amphibious aircraft. High-wing pusher configuration
Advanced Aviation Carrera
(1990s) single-engine two-seat ultralight aircraft. High-wing pusher configuration
Advanced Aviation Cobra
(1980s) single-engine single-seat ultralight aircraft. High-wing pusher configuration
Advanced Aviation Explorer
(1990s) single-engine two-seat ultralight aircraft. High-wing pusher configuration
Advanced Aviation King Cobra
(1990s) single-engine two-seat ultralight aircraft. High-wing pusher configuration
Advanced Aviation Zephyr
(1990s) single-engine two-seat ultralight aircraft. High-wing pusher configuration
