= Aviate Raptor =

South African ultralight trike aircraft

Raptor

General information
- Type: Ultralight trike
- National origin: South Africa
- Manufacturer: Aviate Products
- Designer: Manfred Springer
- Status: Production completed
- Number built: 50 (2000)

History
- Introduction date: 1992

The Aviate Raptor is a South African two-seat ultralight trike that was designed by Manfred Springer and produced by Aviate Products of Booysens. The aircraft was introduced in 1992 and supplied as a kit for amateur construction.

== Design and development ==
The Raptor was designed to comply with the Fédération Aéronautique Internationale microlight category, including the category's maximum gross weight of 450 kg (992 lb). It also carries South African government certification. The aircraft has a maximum gross weight of 450 kg (992 lb). It features a cable-braced hang glider-style high-wing, weight-shift controls, a two-seats-in-tandem open cockpit, tricycle landing gear and a single engine in pusher configuration.

The aircraft is made from steel tubing, with its double-surface Raptor 17 XP wing covered in Dacron sailcloth. Its 10.5 m (34.4 ft) span wing incorporates 34 stiffening battens, is supported by a single tube-type kingpost and uses an "A" frame control bar. The basic aircraft offered a standard 30 kW (40 hp) Rotax 447 twin cylinder, two stroke, air-cooled, single ignition engine, while the Raptor 912 model came equipped with the 60 kW (80 hp) Rotax 912UL four cylinder, four-stroke air- and liquid-cooled, dual ignition engine. The 48 kW (64 hp) Rotax 582 was also a factory option. The aircraft was supplied as a kit that requires 20 to 30 hours to assemble.

Factory standard equipment included two bucket seats, side skirts with integral saddle bags and a nose wheel fender. In 2000 the carriage cost US$3500 and the Raptor 17 XP wing cost $4500. The aircraft's carriage was designed so that it would also accept French Cosmos ULM wings. Fifty examples had been delivered by 2000.

== Variants ==
Raptor
Basic model introduced in 1996 with 30 kW (40 hp) Rotax 447 or 48 kW (64 hp) Rotax 582 engine
Raptor 912
Model introduced in 2000, equipped with the 60 kW (80 hp) Rotax 912UL engine and came standard from the factory with many optional extras

== Specifications (version) ==
Data from Bertrand

General characteristics

- Crew: one
- Capacity: one passenger
- Wingspan: 10.5 m (34 ft 5 in)
- Wing area: 17.0 m^{2} (183 sq ft)
- Empty weight: 163 kg (359 lb)
- Gross weight: 450 kg (992 lb)
- Fuel capacity: 50 litres (11 imp gal; 13 US gal)
- Powerplant: 1 × Rotax 582 twin cylinder, two-stroke, liquid-cooled, aircraft engine, 48 kW (64 hp)

Performance

- Maximum speed: 116 km/h (72 mph, 63 kn)
- Cruise speed: 80 km/h (50 mph, 43 kn)
- Stall speed: 51 km/h (32 mph, 28 kn)
- Rate of climb: 4.1 m/s (810 ft/min)
