= Concept Prowler =

American ultralight trike aircraft

Prowler

General information
- Type: Ultralight trike
- National origin: United States
- Manufacturer: Concept Aviation
- Status: Production completed

The Concept Prowler is an American ultralight trike that was designed and produced by Concept Aviation of Knoxville, Tennessee.

== Design and development ==
The aircraft was designed to comply with the US FAR 103 Ultralight Vehicles rules, including the category's maximum empty weight of 254 lb (115 kg). The aircraft has a standard empty weight of 248 lb (112 kg). It features a cable-braced hang glider-style high-wing, weight-shift controls, a single-seat, open cockpit, tricycle landing gear and a single engine in pusher configuration.

The Prowler's design goals included maximum cruise speed and to achieve this a wing of small area was selected. This results in an ultralight with a cruise speed of 57 mph (92 km/h), at the expense of a stall speed of 28 mph (45 km/h), the fastest stall speed permitted by FAR 103 category rules.

The aircraft is made from bolted-together aluminum tubing, with its double-surface wing covered in Dacron sailcloth. Its 110 sq ft (10 m^{2}) area wing is supported by a single tube-type kingpost and uses an "A" frame control bar. The standard engines supplied was the 40 hp (30 kW) Rotax 447 twin cylinder, two-stroke, air-cooled, single ignition aircraft engine. A cockpit fairing and wheel pants were factory options.

== Specifications (Prowler) ==
Data from Cliche

General characteristics

- Crew: one
- Wing area: 110 sq ft (10 m^{2})
- Empty weight: 248 lb (112 kg)
- Fuel capacity: 5 U.S. gallons (19 L; 4.2 imp gal)
- Powerplant: 1 × Rotax 447 twin cylinder, two-stroke, air-cooled, single ignition aircraft engine, 40 hp (30 kW)

Performance

- Cruise speed: 57 mph (92 km/h, 50 kn)
- Stall speed: 28 mph (45 km/h, 24 kn)
- Rate of climb: 1,050 ft/min (5.3 m/s)
