= Bell Sidewinder =

American ultralight aircraft

Sidewinder

General information
- Type: Ultralight aircraft
- National origin: United States
- Designer: Fred Bell
- Status: Production completed

History
- Developed from: Phantom X1

The Bell Sidewinder is an American ultralight aircraft, supplied as a kit for amateur construction.

== Design and development ==
The Sidewinder is a copy of the Phantom X1 that was built by former Phantom Aeronautics employee Fred Bell. It was designed to comply with the US FAR 103 Ultralight Vehicles rules, including the category's maximum empty weight of 254 lb (115 kg). The aircraft has a standard empty weight of 250 lb (113 kg). It features a cable-braced high-wing, a single-seat, open cockpit, tricycle landing gear and a single engine in tractor configuration.

The aircraft is made from bolted-together aluminum tubing, with the flying surfaces covered in Dacron sailcloth. The Sidewinder differs from the X1 in having flaps. Its 30 ft (9.1 m) span wing is cable-braced from an inverted "V" kingpost mounted on top of the wing. The landing gear has suspension on all wheels and features a steerable nosewheel, plus main wheel brakes. The pilot is accommodated on an open seat, partially enclosed by a fibreglass fairing with a windshield. The standard engine provided was the Kawasaki TA 440A snowmobile powerplant of 37 hp (28 kW).

== Specifications (Sidewinder) ==
Data from Cliche

General characteristics

- Crew: one
- Length: 16 ft 6 in (5.03 m)
- Wingspan: 30 ft 0 in (9.14 m)
- Height: 7 ft 10 in (2.39 m)
- Wing area: 154 sq ft (14.3 m^{2})
- Empty weight: 250 lb (113 kg)
- Gross weight: 500 lb (227 kg)
- Fuel capacity: 5 U.S. gallons (19 L; 4.2 imp gal)
- Powerplant: 1 × Kawasaki TA 440A Twin cylinder, two-stroke snowmobile engine, with a 2.3:1 belt reduction drive, 37 hp (28 kW)
- Propellers: 2-bladed wooden, 4 ft 2 in (1.27 m) diameter

Performance

- Maximum speed: 60 mph (97 km/h, 52 kn)
- Cruise speed: 50 mph (80 km/h, 43 kn)
- Stall speed: 26 mph (42 km/h, 23 kn)
- Never exceed speed: 100 mph (160 km/h, 87 kn)
- Service ceiling: 14,500 ft (4,400 m)
- g limits: +6/-4 (calculated)
- Maximum glide ratio: 7:1
- Rate of climb: 800 ft/min (4.1 m/s)
- Rate of sink: 490 ft/min (2.5 m/s)
- Wing loading: 3.25 lb/sq ft (15.9 kg/m^{2})

== See also ==
Related development

- Worldwide Ultralite Spitfire
