= LiteWing Aircraft =

American aircraft manufacturer

- Company type: Privately held company
- Industry: Aerospace
- Fate: Out of business circa 2000
- Headquarters: Caryville, Tennessee, United States
- Products: Kit aircraft, ultralight trikes

LiteWing Aircraft was an American aircraft manufacturer based in Caryville, Tennessee. The company specialized in the design and manufacture of ultralight trikes in the form of kits for amateur construction and ready-to-fly aircraft under the US FAR 103 Ultralight Vehicles rules.

The company seems to have gone out of business about 2000.

The company built two models, the LiteWing for the US homebuilt category and The Lite Trike for the ultralight category. The latter was noted for its exceptional low empty weight of 180 lb (82 kg) and its very minimalist design.

== Aircraft ==
Summary of aircraft built by LiteWing Aircraft
Model name	First flight	Number built	Type
LiteWing Aircraft LiteWing		20 (2000)	Single seat ultralight trike
LiteWing Aircraft LiteTrike		20 (2000)	Single seat ultralight trike
