= Advanced Aviation Husky =

Family of American ultralight aircraft

Advanced Aviation Husky and Coyote

General information
- Type: Ultralight aircraft
- National origin: United States
- Manufacturer: Advanced Aviation
- Status: Production completed

History
- Introduction date: 1978
- Developed from: Eipper Quicksilver
- Variant: Advanced Aviation Cobra

The Advanced Aviation Husky, Hi-Nuski and Coyote are a family of American ultralight aircraft that was designed and produced by Advanced Aviation. The aircraft was supplied as a kit for amateur construction and introduced in 1978.

== Design and development ==
The Husky predates the US FAR 103 Ultralight Vehicles rules, but complies with them, including the category's maximum empty weight of 254 lb (115 kg). The aircraft has a standard empty weight of 198 lb (90 kg). It features a cable-braced high-wing, a single-seat, open cockpit, tricycle landing gear and a single engine in pusher configuration. The aircraft is described as a "RipSilver", an unlicensed clone of the Eipper Quicksilver, which it closely resembles.

The Husky is made from aluminum tubing, with the wings and tail surfaces covered in Dacron sailcloth. Its 33.5 ft (10.2 m) span wing is cable braced from a single kingpost. The pilot is accommodated with a sling seat, suspended from the wing. The control system is unconventional with pitch controlled by weight shift, while roll is controlled by wing-mounted spoilers controlled by cables attached to the pilot's seat and actuated by weight shift. The tail surfaces are fixed.

The Husky was later developed into the Advanced Aviation Cobra.

== Variants ==
Husky
Version with a Cuyuna 430D direct drive engine of 30 hp (22 kW). Also called the Hi-Nusky.
Coyote
Version with a Cuyuna 215 reduction drive engine of 20 hp (15 kW).

== Specifications (Husky) ==
Data from Cliche and the Virtual Ultralight Museum

General characteristics

- Crew: One
- Length: 16 ft 9 in (5.11 m)
- Wingspan: 33 ft 6 in (10.21 m)
- Height: 9 ft 9 in (2.97 m)
- Wing area: 166 sq ft (15.4 m^{2})
- Empty weight: 198 lb (90 kg)
- Gross weight: 468 lb (212 kg)
- Fuel capacity: 4.8 U.S. gallons (18 L; 4.0 imp gal)
- Powerplant: 1 × Cuyuna 430D twin cylinder, two stroke aircraft engine, 30 hp (22 kW)

Performance

- Maximum speed: 53 mph (85 km/h, 46 kn)
- Cruise speed: 45 mph (72 km/h, 39 kn)
- Stall speed: 24 mph (39 km/h, 21 kn)
- Never exceed speed: 60 mph (97 km/h, 52 kn)
- Maximum glide ratio: 6:1
- Rate of climb: 800 ft/min (4.1 m/s)
