= BB Microlight 103 =

103

General information
- Type: Ultralight trike
- National origin: Hungary
- Manufacturer: BB Microlight
- Status: In production (2013)

The BB Microlight 103 is a Hungarian ultralight trike, designed and produced by BB Microlight of Baja, Hungary. The aircraft is supplied as a complete ready-to-fly-aircraft.

== Design and development ==
The aircraft was designed to comply with the US FAR 103 Ultralight Vehicles rules, including the category's maximum empty weight of 254 lb (115 kg). The aircraft has a standard empty weight of 249 lb (113 kg). It features a cable-braced hang glider-style high-wing, weight-shift controls, a single-seat open cockpit, tricycle landing gear with wheel pants and a single engine in pusher configuration.

The aircraft is made from bolted-together aluminum tubing, with its wing covered in Dacron sailcloth. Its 7.9 m (25.9 ft) span wing is supported by a single tube-type kingpost and uses an "A" frame weight-shift control bar. The powerplant is a twin cylinder, air-cooled, two-stroke, dual-ignition 40 hp (30 kW) Rotax 447 engine. The aircraft has an empty weight of 113 kg (249 lb) and a gross weight of 294 kg (648 lb), giving a useful load of 181 kg (399 lb). With full fuel of 30 litres (6.6 imp gal; 7.9 US gal) the payload is 159 kg (351 lb).

The carriage comes with brakes, full suspension and a cockpit fairing, but is also available in nanotrike form without the fairings.

A number of different wings can be fitted to the basic carriage, including the BB Microlight BB-03 Trya and the US-made 40% double surface Manta RST. The Manta RST comes in four sizes, graded by wing area: 12.5 m^{2} (135 sq ft), 15.5 m^{2} (167 sq ft), 17 m^{2} (180 sq ft) and 19 m^{2} (200 sq ft).

In the United States the aircraft is imported by Manta Aircraft and fitted with the Manta RST wing.

== Specifications (103 with Manta RST 12.5 wing) ==
Data from Bayerl

General characteristics

- Crew: one
- Wingspan: 7.9 m (25 ft 11 in)
- Wing area: 12.5 m^{2} (135 sq ft)
- Empty weight: 113 kg (249 lb)
- Gross weight: 294 kg (648 lb)
- Fuel capacity: 30 litres (6.6 imp gal; 7.9 US gal)
- Powerplant: 1 × Rotax 447 twin cylinder, air-cooled, two stroke aircraft engine, 30 kW (40 hp)
- Propellers: 2-bladed wooden

Performance

- Maximum speed: 100 km/h (62 mph, 54 kn)
- Cruise speed: 84 km/h (52 mph, 45 kn)
- Stall speed: 42 km/h (26 mph, 23 kn)
- Wing loading: 23.5 kg/m^{2} (4.8 lb/sq ft)
