= LiteWing Aircraft LiteTrike =

American ulgtralight trike

LiteTrike

General information
- Type: Ultralight trike
- National origin: United States
- Manufacturer: LiteWing Aircraft
- Status: Production completed
- Number built: 20 (February 2000)

The LiteWing Aircraft LiteTrike, also called The Lite Trike, is an American ultralight trike that was designed and produced by LiteWing Aircraft of Caryville, Tennessee in the late 1990s. The aircraft was supplied fully assembled.

== Design and development ==
The aircraft was designed to comply with the US FAR 103 Ultralight Vehicles rules, including the category's maximum empty weight of 254 lb (115 kg). The aircraft has a standard empty weight of 180 lb (82 kg). It features a very minimalist design, a cable-braced hang glider-style high-wing, weight-shift controls, a single-seat, open cockpit, tricycle landing gear and a single engine in pusher configuration.

The aircraft is made from bolted-together aluminum tubing, with its single or double-surface wing covered in Dacron sailcloth. Its 34 ft (10.4 m) span wing is supported by a single tube-type kingpost and uses an "A" frame control bar. The engine factory supplied was the 22 hp (16 kW) Zenoah G-25 single cylinder, two-stroke powerplant although the carriage can support engines up to the 40 hp (30 kW) Rotax 447. Although the standard model did not include a cockpit fairing, one was an available factory option.

The LiteTrike was designed to use any hang glider wing that the owner might have and to facilitate this the manufacturer provided strengthening kits with keel sleeves and thicker flying wires. When equipped with the Rotax 447 engine a stronger wing is required and the factory also supplied purpose-designed trike wings for this role.

Twenty examples had been flown by February 2000.

== Specifications (LiteTrike) ==
Data from Cliche and Kitplanes

General characteristics

- Crew: one
- Length: 8 ft (2.4 m)
- Wingspan: 34 ft (10 m)
- Height: 7 ft (2.1 m)
- Wing area: 200 sq ft (19 m^{2})
- Empty weight: 180 lb (82 kg)
- Gross weight: 440 lb (200 kg)
- Fuel capacity: 5 U.S. gallons (19 L; 4.2 imp gal)
- Powerplant: 1 × Zenoah G-25 single cylinder, two-stroke aircraft engine, 22 hp (16 kW)
- Propellers: 2-bladed wooden

Performance

- Cruise speed: 30 mph (48 km/h, 26 kn)
- Stall speed: 15 mph (24 km/h, 13 kn)
- Range: 90 mi (140 km, 78 nmi)
- Service ceiling: 10,000 ft (3,000 m)
- Rate of climb: 400 ft/min (2.0 m/s)
