= Cloudbaser Trikes Cloudbaser =

General information
- Type: Ultralight trike
- Manufacturer: Cloudbaser Trikes
- Status: Production completed

The Cloudbaser Trikes Cloudbaser is a flying wing ultralight trike that was designed and produced by Cloudbaser Trikes. The aircraft was supplied as a kit and was also available as plans for amateur construction.

Production has been completed and new aircraft are no longer available.

== Design and development ==
The aircraft was designed to comply with the US FAR 103 Ultralight Vehicles rules, including the category's maximum empty weight of 254 lb (115 kg). The Cloudbaser has a standard empty weight of 185 lb (84 kg). It features a cable-braced hang glider-style high-wing, weight-shift controls, a single-seat, open cockpit, tricycle landing gear and a single engine in pusher configuration.

The aircraft is made from bolted-together aluminum tubing, with its single surface wing covered in Dacron sailcloth. Its 185 sq ft (17.2 m^{2}) area wing is supported by a single tube-type kingpost and uses an "A" frame control bar. Because of the light weight of the aircraft, standard hang glider wings can be used. The landing gear features a steerable nose wheel. The standard recommended engine is the Rotax 447 twin cylinder, two-stroke single ignition powerplant of 40 hp (30 kW).

The Cloudbaser was designed for minimalism and also portability. The use of a single surface wing makes it easier to fold up and transport on a car-top rack. Set up time is reported to be 30 minutes.

A two-seat version was also marketed by the company.

== Specifications (single seater) ==
Data from Cliche

General characteristics

- Crew: one
- Wing area: 185 sq ft (17.2 m^{2})
- Empty weight: 185 lb (84 kg)
- Gross weight: 575 lb (261 kg)
- Fuel capacity: 5 U.S. gallons (19 L; 4.2 imp gal)
- Powerplant: 1 × Rotax 447 twin cylinder, two-stroke single ignition aircraft engine, with 2.5:1 reduction gearbox, 40 hp (30 kW)

Performance

- Cruise speed: 50 mph (80 km/h, 43 kn)
- Stall speed: 28 mph (45 km/h, 24 kn)
- Rate of climb: 1,100 ft/min (5.6 m/s)
