= Worldwide Ultralite Clipper =

American ultralight aircraft

Clipper

General information
- Type: Ultralight aircraft
- National origin: United States
- Manufacturer: Worldwide Ultralite Industries
- Status: Production completed

The Worldwide Ultralite Clipper is an American ultralight aircraft that was designed and produced by Worldwide Ultralite Industries of Katy, Texas in the early 1980s. The aircraft was supplied as a kit for amateur construction.

With a strut-braced parasol-wing, conventional landing gear, single engine in tractor configuration and its single-seat, open cockpit configuration, the Clipper resembles a small conventional light aircraft and was designed to appeal to private pilots looking for an ultralight aircraft.

== Design and development ==
The aircraft was designed to comply with the US FAR 103 Ultralight Vehicles rules, including the category's maximum empty weight of 254 lb (115 kg). The aircraft has a standard empty weight of 252 lb (114 kg).

The aircraft is made from bolted-together aluminum tubing, covered in Dacron sailcloth. Its 30 ft (9.1 m) span wing has flaps and is supported by parallel lift struts and jury struts. The airframe was proof tested to +9/-6g ultimate load. The conventional landing gear features balloon tires and a steerable tailwheel. The standard powerplant supplied by the factory was the 40 hp (30 kW) Rotax 447, single ignition, two cylinder, two-stroke aircraft engine.

The company was noted for its marketing of the aircraft at trade shows, such as EAA AirVenture. They employed scantily-clad models to attract attention to the aircraft, something not normally seen at aircraft trade shows.

== Specifications (Clipper) ==
Data from Cliche

General characteristics

- Crew: one
- Length: 17.3 ft (5.3 m)
- Wingspan: 30 ft (9.1 m)
- Height: 7.5 ft (2.3 m)
- Wing area: 154 sq ft (14.3 m^{2})
- Empty weight: 252 lb (114 kg)
- Gross weight: 580 lb (263 kg)
- Fuel capacity: 5 U.S. gallons (19 L; 4.2 imp gal)
- Powerplant: 1 × Rotax 447 single ignition, two cylinder, two-stroke aircraft engine, with 2.5:1 reduction drive, 40 hp (30 kW)

Performance

- Maximum speed: 63 mph (101 km/h, 55 kn)
- Cruise speed: 60 mph (97 km/h, 52 kn)
- Stall speed: 20 mph (32 km/h, 17 kn)
- Never exceed speed: 100 mph (160 km/h, 87 kn)
- Range: 130 mi (210 km, 110 nmi)
- Service ceiling: 14,000 ft (4,300 m)
- g limits: +9/-6 ultimate load
- Rate of climb: 500 ft/min (2.5 m/s)
