= Mariner Aircraft Mariner =

American ultralight flying boat

General information
- Type: Ultralight aircraft
- National origin: United States
- Manufacturer: Mariner Aircraft
- Designer: Larry Seifert
- Status: Production completed

History
- Introduction date: 1989

The Mariner Aircraft Mariner is an American ultralight amphibious flying boat that was designed by Larry Seifert and produced by Mariner Aircraft, starting in 1989. The aircraft was supplied as a kit for amateur construction.

== Design and development ==
The aircraft was designed to comply with the US FAR 103 Ultralight Vehicles rules, including the category's maximum empty weight of 254 lb (115 kg) plus floats. In its monoplane single seat version the aircraft has a standard empty weight of 304 lb (138 kg). Many were registered as amateur-builts rather than ultralights. It features a multiple wing arrangement, a single-seat, open cockpit, re-positionable conventional landing gear and a single engine in pusher configuration.

The aircraft is made from sheet aluminum, aluminum tubing and aircraft fabric, with a plywood hull. The aircraft was sold in three different models. The first is a biplane design, with a pusher engine mounted between the wings. Engines used include the 40 hp (30 kW) Rotax 447, 50 hp (37 kW) Rotax 503 and 64 hp (48 kW) Rotax 582 and 73 hp (54 kW) Subaru EA-81. The top wing of the biplane was removed and the lower wing increased in span to create a low-wing monoplane version, available in single and two seat versions. The final model mounts the top wing only in parasol wing configuration and features two seats in tandem.

The company went out of business in the early 1990s after only a few years of production.

== Variants ==
Mariner biplane
Original single seat biplane model
Mariner monoplane
Second model with an increased span lower wing and the top wing removed. Available in single and two-seat models.
Mariner parasol
Third model with the top wing retained and the lower wing removed and two seats in tandem.

== Specifications (Mariner monoplane) ==
Data from Cliche

General characteristics

- Crew: one
- Wingspan: 32 ft (9.8 m)
- Wing area: 141 sq ft (13.1 m^{2})
- Empty weight: 304 lb (138 kg)
- Gross weight: 650 lb (295 kg)
- Fuel capacity: 10 U.S. gallons (38 L; 8.3 imp gal)
- Powerplant: 1 × Rotax 447 twin cylinder, two-stroke, single ignition aircraft engine, 40 hp (30 kW)
- Propellers: 2-bladed wooden

Performance

- Cruise speed: 55 mph (89 km/h, 48 kn)
- Stall speed: 27 mph (43 km/h, 23 kn)
- Range: 75 mi (121 km, 65 nmi)
- Service ceiling: 12,000 ft (3,700 m)
- g limits: +6/-4
- Rate of climb: 800 ft/min (4.1 m/s)
