= Hy-Tek Hurricane 103 =

General information
- Type: Ultralight aircraft
- National origin: United States
- Manufacturer: Hy-Tek Hurricane
- Designer: Mihaly Kun
- Status: Out of production

History
- Introduction date: 1991
- Developed from: Phantom X1

The Hy-Tek Hurricane 103 is a family of single-engined, high wing tricycle gear-equipped aircraft that were available in kit form from Hy-Tek Hurricane of Aurora, Oregon.

The Hurricane 103 and Ultra 103 designs are intended to have empty weights under 254 lb (115 kg) and fit into the US FAR 103 ultralight category. The remaining designs are heavier and fit into the US Experimental - Amateur-built category.

== Development ==
The Hurricane was originally developed as a clone of the Phantom X1 design by Jack Britton in the late 1980s and marketed under the name Avenger. Following Britton's death the design was acquired by Donnie Eccker who marketed it as the Hurricane. The aircraft was introduced to the market in 1991 and benefited from the end of production of the Phantom that same year. As a result of the timing, the quality of the kits produced and the low price, the aircraft quickly achieved market success.

In 1996 the rights to the design along with the tooling were sold to Hy-Tek. The aircraft is no longer in production.

== Design ==
As a copy of the Phantom X1, the Hurricane family shares its construction. The wings, tail and fuselage are constructed of anodized aluminum tubing, bolted together. The wings and tail surfaces are covered with Dacron envelopes. The wings are supported by cable-bracing from an inverted V-kingpost. The cockpit fairing, or pod, is made from fibreglass. The aircraft features tricycle landing gear. The engine is mounted on the front of the main tube, the tail being mounted on the far end of the same tube.

The kit takes 80-100 hrs to assemble.

== Variants ==
Hurricane 103
Named for its FAR 103 Ultralight Vehicles compliant empty weight of 252 lb (114 kg), wingspan of 28.0 ft (8.53 m), semi-symmetrical airfoil, standard engine is the 40 hp (30 kW) Rotax 447.
Ultra 103
Named for its FAR 103 Ultralight Vehicles compliant empty weight of 250 lb (113 kg), wingspan of 28.0 ft (8.53 m), flat bottomed high-lift airfoil, standard engine is the 40 hp (30 kW) Rotax 447.
Hurricane HP Clipwing
Two foot shorter wingspan of 26.0 ft (7.92 m), empty weight of 275 lb (125 kg) puts it in the US Experimental-Amateur-built category, semi-symmetrical airfoil, tested to +8/-6 g, standard engine is the 50 hp (37 kW) Rotax 503.
Hurricane Hauler
Wingspan of 28.0 ft (8.53 m), empty weight of 285 lb (129 kg) puts it in the US Experimental-Amateur-built category, wider cockpit for larger pilots, tested to +8/-6 g, standard engine is the 50 hp (37 kW) Rotax 503, with the 64 hp (48 kW) Rotax 582 and 60 hp (45 kW) HKS 700E four stroke as options.
Hurricane II
Two seats in side-by-side seating configuration, with dual controls and dual throttles, sold as an ultralight trainer. The wing is wire-braced from a kingpost. Empty weight of 300 lb (136 kg), wingspan of 30.0 ft (9.14 m) and wing area of 152 sq ft, covered in pre-sewn Dacron envelopes. The wing is fitted with flaps and the elevator features a trim system. The standard engine is the 50 hp (37 kW) Rotax 503.

== Specifications (Hurricane 103) ==
Data from Cliche, Kitplanes and Purdy

General characteristics

- Crew: one
- Length: 17 ft 0 in (5.18 m)
- Wingspan: 28 ft 0 in (8.53 m)
- Height: 8 ft 2 in (2.49 m)
- Wing area: 143 sq ft (13.3 m^{2})
- Airfoil: semi-symmetrical
- Empty weight: 252 lb (114 kg)
- Gross weight: 525 lb (238 kg)
- Powerplant: 1 × Rotax 447 twin cylinder, two stroke aircraft engine, 40 hp (30 kW)
- Propellers: 2-bladed ground adjustable

Performance

- Maximum speed: 100 mph (160 km/h, 87 kn)
- Cruise speed: 65 mph (105 km/h, 56 kn)
- Stall speed: 27 mph (43 km/h, 23 kn)
- Range: 80 mi (130 km, 70 nmi)
- Service ceiling: 12,500 ft (3,800 m)
- Rate of climb: 800 ft/min (4.1 m/s)
- Wing loading: 3.67 lb/sq ft (17.9 kg/m^{2})

Avionics

- none

== See also ==
Aircraft of comparable role, configuration, and era

- Flightstar
