= BB Microlight BB-two seater =

BB-two seater

General information
- Type: Ultralight trike
- National origin: Hungary
- Manufacturer: BB Microlight
- Status: In production (2013)

The BB Microlight BB-two seater is a Hungarian ultralight trike, designed and produced by BB Microlight of Baja, Hungary. The aircraft is supplied as a kit for amateur construction or as a complete ready-to-fly-aircraft.

== Design and development ==
The aircraft was designed to comply with the Fédération Aéronautique Internationale microlight category, including the category's maximum gross weight of 450 kg (992 lb). It is marketed in the United States in the Light-sport Aircraft category as an ELSA by Manta Aircraft.

The aircraft features a cable-braced hang glider-style high-wing, weight-shift controls, a two-seats-in-tandem open cockpit, tricycle landing gear with wheel pants and a single engine in pusher configuration.

The aircraft is made from bolted-together aluminum tubing, with its double surface wing covered in Dacron sailcloth. Its 8.1 m (26.6 ft) span wing is supported by a single tube-type kingpost and uses an "A" frame weight-shift control bar. The standard powerplant is a twin cylinder, air-cooled, two-stroke, dual-ignition 50 hp (37 kW) Rotax 503 engine, with the liquid-cooled 64 hp (48 kW) Rotax 582 and the two cylinder, air-cooled, four-stroke, dual-ignition 60 hp (45 kW) HKS 700E engines optional.

The aircraft has an empty weight of 91 kg (201 lb) without the engine fitted and a gross weight of 375 kg (827 lb). Full fuel is 26 litres (5.7 imp gal; 6.9 US gal).

A number of different wings can be fitted to the basic carriage, including the US-made 40% double surface Manta RST and the 80% double surface Manta Orca 12 RST. The Manta RST comes in four sizes, graded by wing area: 12.5 m^{2} (135 sq ft), 15.5 m^{2} (167 sq ft), 17 m^{2} (180 sq ft) and 19 m^{2} (200 sq ft). The Hungarian-made 16 m^{2} (170 sq ft) BB Microlight BB-02 Serpa or the 14 m^{2} (150 sq ft) BB Microlight BB-01 Bence are also available.

== Specifications (BB-two seater with Serpa wing) ==
Data from Bayerl

General characteristics

- Crew: one
- Capacity: one passenger
- Wingspan: 8.1 m (26 ft 7 in)
- Wing area: 16 m^{2} (170 sq ft)
- Empty weight: 91 kg (201 lb) excluding engine
- Gross weight: 375 kg (827 lb)
- Fuel capacity: 26 litres (5.7 imp gal; 6.9 US gal)
- Powerplant: 1 × Rotax 503 twin cylinder, air-cooled, two stroke aircraft engine, 37 kW (50 hp)
- Propellers: 3-bladed composite

Performance

- Maximum speed: 120 km/h (75 mph, 65 kn)
- Cruise speed: 85 km/h (53 mph, 46 kn)
- Stall speed: 40 km/h (25 mph, 22 kn)
- Wing loading: 23.4 kg/m^{2} (4.8 lb/sq ft)
