= Two Wings Mariner UL =

Mariner

General information
- Type: Amphibious biplane
- National origin: United States
- Manufacturer: Two Wings Aviation

The Two Wings Mariner is an American amphibious biplane designed for amateur construction by Two Wings Aviation of Forest Lake, Minnesota.

The Mariner is a metal and fabric constructed amphibious biplane with a 39.6 hp (30 kW) Rotax 447 pusher engine and a retractable tail-dragger landing gear. The aircraft has a single-seat open cockpit with an option to build as a two-seater. The aircraft can be built with a range of small engines including the Rotax 447 and Rotax 582.

== Variants ==
Mariner UL
Ultralight variant for amateur construction.
Mariner EXP
The Mariner EXP is a variant with a 60 hp (45 kW) Subaru engine.

== Specifications ==
Data from

General characteristics

- Crew: 1
- Length: 18 ft 9 in (5.72 m)
- Wingspan: 28 ft 6 in (8.69 m)
- Empty weight: 304 lb (138 kg)
- Gross weight: 950 lb (431 kg)
- Powerplant: 1 × Rotax 447 , 39.6 hp (29.5 kW)
- Propellers: 3-bladed

Performance

- Maximum speed: 62 mph (100 km/h, 54 kn)
- Cruise speed: 55 mph (89 km/h, 48 kn)
- Stall speed: 30 mph (48 km/h, 26 kn)
- Range: 75 mi (120 km, 65 nmi)
- Rate of climb: 800 ft/min (4.1 m/s)
