= GibboGear Butterfly =

American ultralight trike aircraft

Butterfly

General information
- Type: Ultralight trike
- National origin: United States
- Manufacturer: GibboGear
- Designer: Mark Gibson
- Status: Production completed

The GibboGear Butterfly is an American single-seat, flying wing ultralight trike that was designed by Mark Gibson and produced by his company, GibboGear of Winter Haven, Florida. The aircraft was supplied as a kit for amateur construction.

== Design and development ==
The aircraft was designed for the Fédération Aéronautique Internationale microlight class, with the intention of reversing the trend of its period, which saw heavier, more expensive trikes that stall faster and were harder to fly, thus requiring more flight training. The Butterfly addresses these issues by being a simple design and by employing a single surface wing with a large 240 sq ft (22 m^{2}) area. Similarly the carriage is simple and lacks options, to reduce cost and weight. The resulting aircraft has a low landing speed of 20 mph (32 km/h) at the cost of a low cruise speed of 25 mph (40 km/h).

The Butterfly features a cable-braced hang glider-style high-wing, weight-shift controls, a single-seat, open cockpit, tricycle landing gear and a single engine in pusher configuration. The aircraft's single surface wing is made from bolted-together aluminum tubing, covered in Dacron sailcloth. The wing is supported by a single tube-type kingpost and uses an "A" frame control bar. When the aircraft was in production the wing was also available from the factory as a kit, as well as fully assembled. The landing gear uses tubular suspension and the nose wheel is steerable. The engines that were factory-supplied included the twin-cylinder, two-stroke air-cooled 40 hp (30 kW) Rotax 447 and 50 hp (37 kW) Rotax 503.

== Specifications (Butterfly) ==
Data from Cliche and Bertrand

General characteristics

- Crew: one
- Wingspan: 32 ft 10 in (10 m)
- Wing area: 240 sq ft (22 m^{2})
- Empty weight: 290 lb (132 kg)
- Gross weight: 660 lb (299 kg)
- Fuel capacity: 10 U.S. gallons (38 L; 8.3 imp gal)
- Powerplant: 1 × Rotax 447 twin-cylinder, two-stroke air-cooled aircraft engine, 40 hp (30 kW)

Performance

- Cruise speed: 25 mph (40 km/h, 22 kn)
- Stall speed: 19 mph (31 km/h, 17 kn)
- Rate of climb: 750 ft/min (3.8 m/s)
