= LiteWing Aircraft LiteWing =

American ultralight trike aircraft

LiteWing

General information
- Type: Ultralight trike
- National origin: United States
- Manufacturer: LiteWing Aircraft
- Status: Production completed
- Number built: 20 (February 2000)

The LiteWing Aircraft LiteWing, also called the Lite Wing Trike, is an American ultralight trike that was designed and produced by LiteWing Aircraft of Caryville, Tennessee in the late 1990s. The aircraft was supplied as a kit for amateur construction.

== Design and development ==
The aircraft was designed to be a US homebuilt aircraft as its empty weight exceeds the US FAR 103 Ultralight Vehicles rules, which imposes a category maximum empty weight of 254 lb (115 kg). The LiteWing has a standard empty weight of 280 lb (127 kg). It features a cable-braced hang glider-style high-wing, weight-shift controls, a single-seat, open cockpit with a three-piece fiberglass cockpit fairing, tricycle landing gear with wheel pants and a single engine in pusher configuration.

The aircraft is made from welded and bolted 6061-T6 aluminum tubing, with its NorthWing 157 wing covered in Dacron sailcloth. Its 32 ft (9.8 m) span wing is supported by a single tube-type kingpost and uses an "A" frame control bar. The engine factory supplied was the 40 hp (30 kW) Rotax 447 twin cylinder, two-stroke, air-cooled aircraft engine. The aircraft can accept engines of 40 to 50 hp (30 to 37 kW). Brakes on the main wheels are standard equipment.

Twenty examples had been completed and flown by February 2000.

== Specifications (LiteWing) ==
Data from Cliche and Kitplanes

General characteristics

- Crew: one
- Length: 8 ft 6 in (2.59 m)
- Wingspan: 32 ft (9.8 m)
- Height: 7 ft 6 in (2.29 m)
- Wing area: 160 sq ft (15 m^{2})
- Empty weight: 280 lb (127 kg)
- Gross weight: 600 lb (272 kg)
- Fuel capacity: 6 U.S. gallons (23 L; 5.0 imp gal)
- Powerplant: 1 × Rotax 447 twin cylinder, two-stroke aircraft engine, 40 hp (30 kW)
- Propellers: 2-bladed wooden

Performance

- Cruise speed: 60 mph (97 km/h, 52 kn)
- Service ceiling: 10,000 ft (3,000 m)
- Rate of climb: 1,000 ft/min (5.1 m/s)
