= Aero Adventure Aventura =

General aviation amphibian aircraft

Aventura
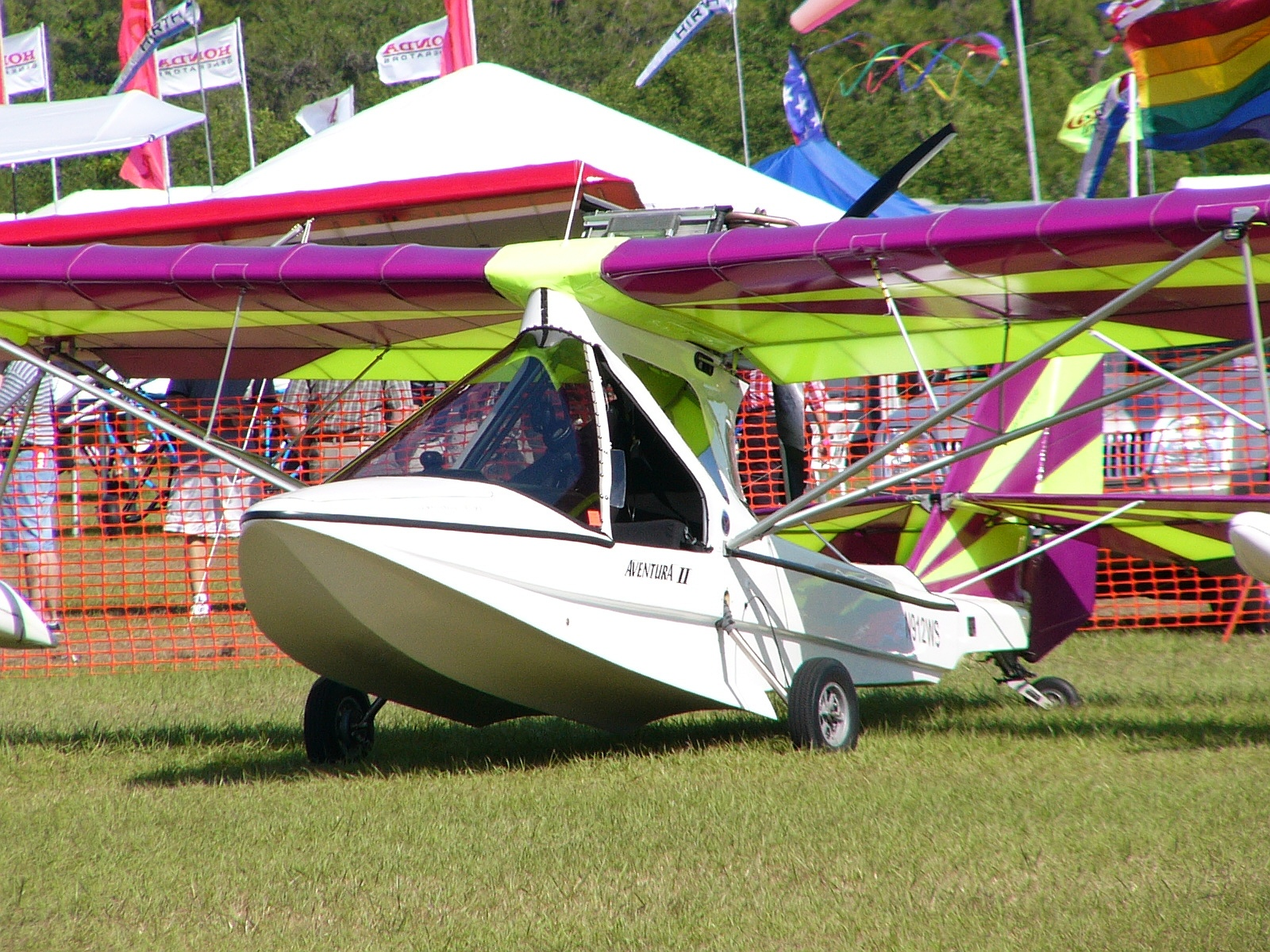
- Aero Adventure Aventura II

General information
- Type: Ultralight aircraft
- National origin: United States
- Manufacturer: Aero Adventure
- Designer: Bob Bailey

History
- Introduction date: 1995
- First flight: 1995
- Developed from: Advanced Aeromarine Buccaneer

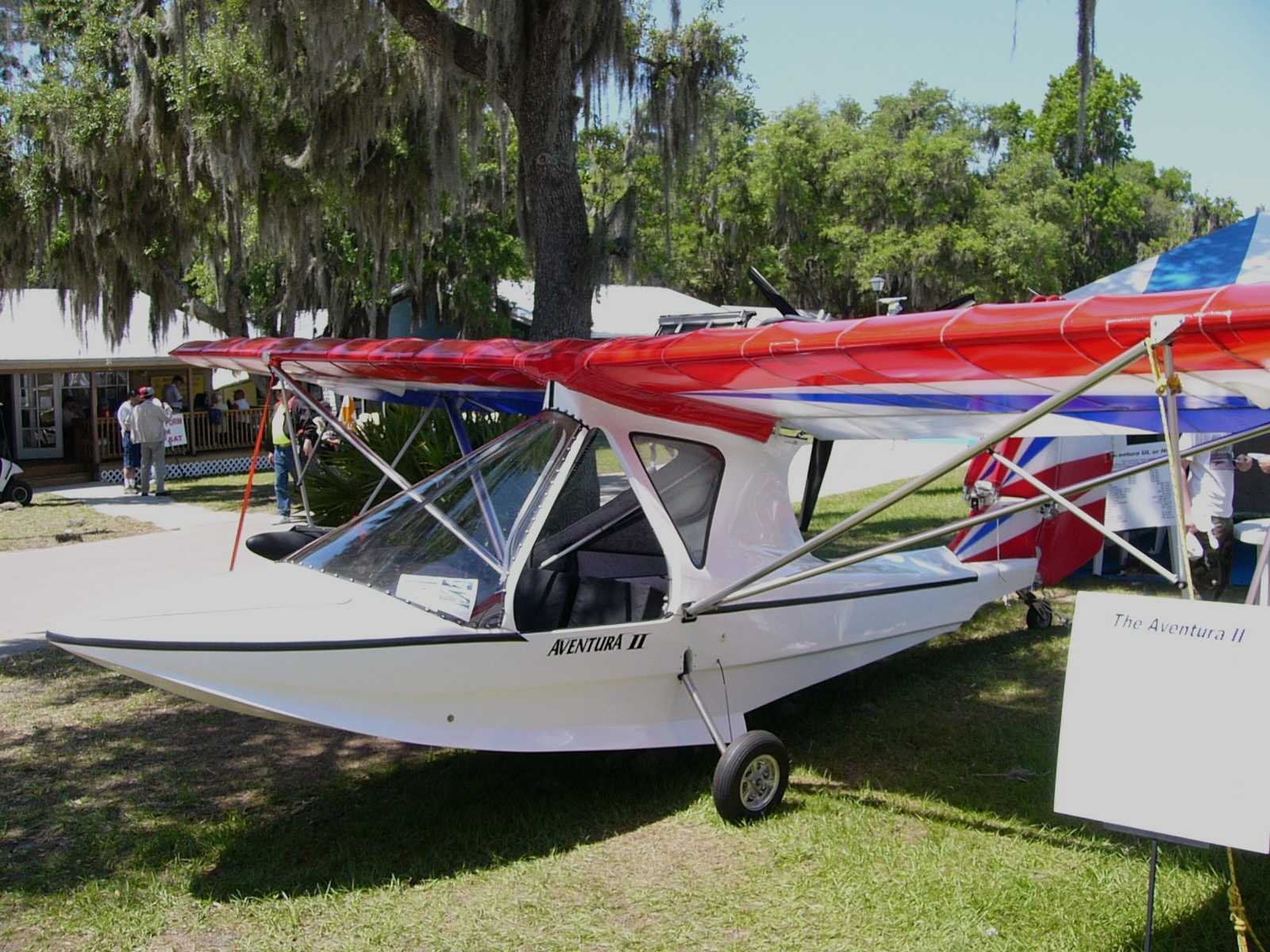
An Aventura II at Sun 'n Fun 2004

The Aero Adventure Aventura is a family of ultralight amphibians marketed as a kit aircraft by Aero Adventure of DeLand, Florida. The aircraft was designed by Bob Bailey in 1995.

The aircraft are high-wing flying boats of pusher configuration available in both single and two-seat models. Its design heritage stretches back to the Advanced Aeromarine Buccaneer amphibian ultralights.

== Design ==
Introduced in 1995, the single-seat Aventura has repositionable main landing gear, down for runways and up for landing on water. The steerable tail wheel is retractable in concert with the repositioning of the main gear. There is no water rudder. The wing is an aluminium frame covered with pre-sewn Dacron envelopes. The hull is constructed from fibreglass and the wingtip floats are polyethylene. The remainder of the structure is anodized aluminium tubing, bolted together. Controls are conventional three-axis, with full span ailerons and no flaps. The company claims that the fast-build kit can be constructed in 90 hours.

The two-seat Aventura II was introduced in 1996 and is similar to the single seater, but with a wider cabin and hull for two occupants in side-by-side configuration. The two-seater also features flaps to reduce landing speeds. The company claims 130 hours to build the two-seater from the kit.

== Variants ==
Aventura UL
Single seater optimised for the US FAR 103 Ultralight Vehicle category, with an empty weight of 328 lb (149 kg). Engines include the original 28 hp (21 kW) Rotax 277 in early models and the 40 hp (30 kW) Rotax 447 currently. 90 had been completed and flown by the end of 2011.
Aventura HP
Single seater intended to be registered as an amateur-built aircraft. Standard engines are the 50 hp (37 kW) Rotax 503 64 hp (48 kW) Rotax 582. 42 had been completed and flown by the end of 2011.
Aventura Sport
Two-seater marketed as the simplest and lightest model in the line-up. Standard engine is the 64 hp (48 kW) Rotax 582. 215 had been completed and flown by the end of 2011.
Aventura II
Two-seater with some options included as standard features. Standard engine is the 100 hp (75 kW) four-stroke Rotax 912ULS.
Aventura XLR
Limited edition two-seater with many extras as standard features, including a new style engine cowling, custom graphics package, redesigned instrument panel including GPS, vertical speed indicator and a mode-C transponder, electric landing gear retraction, gear indicator lights, differential hydraulic brakes, carpeting and a headliner. The standard engine is the 100 hp (75 kW) four-stroke Rotax 912ULS.
Aventura AVZ
Model with top-of-the-line equipment as standard.

== Specifications (Aventura HP) ==
Data from KitPlanes

General characteristics

- Crew: one
- Length: 20.6 ft (6.3 m)
- Wingspan: 29.8 ft (9.1 m)
- Wing area: 170 sq ft (15.8 m^{2})
- Empty weight: 390 lb (177 kg)
- Gross weight: 750 lb (340 kg)
- Fuel capacity: 12 U.S. gallons (45 L; 10.0 imp gal)
- Powerplant: 1 × Rotax 503 two cylinder, two stroke aircraft engine, 50 hp (37 kW)

Performance

- Cruise speed: 73 mph (117 km/h, 63 kn)
- Stall speed: 32 mph (51 km/h, 28 kn)
- Range: 250 mi (400 km, 220 nmi)
- Rate of climb: 1,100 ft/min (5.6 m/s)

== See also ==
Related development

- Advanced Aeromarine Buccaneer
