= Bagalini Colombo =

Italian homebuilt aircraft

Colombo

General information
- Type: Homebuilt aircraft
- National origin: United States
- Designer: Marino Bagalini
- Status: Plans available (1998)

The Bagalini Colombo (English: Dove) is an Italian homebuilt aircraft that was designed by Marino Bagalini. The aircraft is supplied in the form of plans for amateur construction.

== Design and development ==
The Colombo features a strut-braced parasol wing, a two-seats in side-by-side configuration open cockpit with a windshield, fixed conventional landing gear, or optional tricycle landing gear, and a single engine in tractor configuration.

The aircraft is made from wood and metal, with its flying surfaces covered in doped aircraft fabric. Its 10.5 m (34.4 ft) span wing employs an RSG 35 airfoil at the wing root, transitioning to an RSG 36 airfoil at the wing tip. The wing mounts Junkers ailerons and has a wing area of 16.723 m^{2} (180.00 sq ft). The standard engine used is the 40 hp (30 kW) Rotax 447 two-stroke powerplant.

The Colombo has an empty weight of 150 kg (330 lb) and a gross weight of 320 kg (710 lb), giving a useful load of 170 kg (370 lb). With full fuel of 23 litres (5.1 imp gal; 6.1 US gal) the payload is 151 kg (333 lb).

The manufacturer estimates construction time from the supplied kit to be 700 hours.

== Specifications (Colombo) ==
Data from AeroCrafter and The Incomplete Guide to Airfoil Usage

General characteristics

- Crew: one
- Capacity: one passenger
- Length: 6.40 m (21 ft 0 in)
- Wingspan: 10.49 m (34.40 ft)
- Empty weight: 150 kg (330 lb)
- Gross weight: 318 kg (700 lb)
- Fuel capacity: 23 litres (5.1 imp gal; 6.1 US gal)
- Powerplant: 1 × Rotax 447 twin cylinder, air-cooled, two-stroke aircraft engine, 30 kW (40 hp)
- Propellers: 3-bladed composite

Performance

- Maximum speed: 100 km/h (62 mph, 54 kn)
- Cruise speed: 66 km/h (41 mph, 36 kn)
- Stall speed: 42 km/h (26 mph, 23 kn)
- Range: 190 km (120 mi, 100 nmi)
- Rate of climb: 4.1 m/s (800 ft/min)
- Wing loading: 19 kg/m^{2} (3.9 lb/sq ft)
