= Mathews Mr Easy =

American homebuilt aircraft

Mr Easy

General information
- Type: Homebuilt aircraft
- National origin: United States
- Manufacturer: Vintage Ultralight and Lightplane Association
- Designer: Lyle Mathews and associates
- Status: Plans available (2014)
- Number built: at least two

The Mathews Mr Easy is an American homebuilt aircraft that was designed by Lyle Mathews and associates and produced by the Vintage Ultralight and Lightplane Association of Marietta, Georgia. It was the sixth and final design of Mathews. The aircraft is supplied in the form of plans for amateur construction.

== Design and development ==
The aircraft was designed to comply with the US FAR 103 Ultralight Vehicles rules, including the category's maximum empty weight of 254 lb (115 kg). The aircraft has a standard empty weight of 250 lb (113 kg).

Mr Easy features a strut-braced and cable-braced biplane layout, a single-seat, open cockpit, fixed conventional landing gear and a single engine in pusher configuration, mounted above the tail boom tube.

The aircraft is made from bolted-together aluminum tubing, with its flying surfaces covered in doped aircraft fabric. Its 24.00 ft (7.3 m) span wing has a wing area of 145.0 sq ft (13.47 m^{2}). The standard engine used is the 40 hp (30 kW) Rotax 447 two-stroke twin-cylinder powerplant.

Mr Easy has a typical empty weight of 250 lb (110 kg) and a gross weight of 485 lb (220 kg), giving a useful load of 235 lb (107 kg). With full fuel of 5 U.S. gallons (19 L; 4.2 imp gal) the payload for the pilot and baggage is 205 lb (93 kg).

The standard day, sea level, no wind, take off and landing roll with a 40 hp (30 kW) engine is 175 ft (53 m).

The designer estimates the construction time from the supplied plans as 250 hours.

== Operational history ==
In the United States ultralights are not required to be registered, and in April 2014 no examples were in fact registered in the United States with the Federal Aviation Administration, although a total of two had been registered at one time.

== Specifications (Mr Easy) ==
Data from AeroCrafter

General characteristics

- Crew: one
- Wingspan: 24 ft 0 in (7.32 m)
- Wing area: 145.0 sq ft (13.47 m^{2})
- Empty weight: 250 lb (113 kg)
- Gross weight: 485 lb (220 kg)
- Fuel capacity: 5 U.S. gallons (19 L; 4.2 imp gal)
- Powerplant: 1 × Rotax 447 twin cylinder, air-cooled, two stroke aircraft engine, 40 hp (30 kW)
- Propellers: 3-bladed composite, ground adjustable

Performance

- Maximum speed: 63 mph (101 km/h, 55 kn)
- Cruise speed: 50 mph (80 km/h, 43 kn)
- Stall speed: 28 mph (45 km/h, 24 kn)
- Range: 120 mi (190 km, 100 nmi)
- Rate of climb: 800 ft/min (4.1 m/s)
- Wing loading: 3.3 lb/sq ft (16 kg/m^{2})
