= Golden Gate Mosquito =

American ultralight aircraft

Mosquito

General information
- Type: Ultralight aircraft
- National origin: United States
- Manufacturer: Golden Gate Aviation
- Status: Production completed

History
- Developed from: Phantom X1

The Golden Gate Mosquito is an American ultralight aircraft that was produced by Golden Gate Aviation. The aircraft was supplied as a kit for amateur construction.

== Design and development ==
A copy of the popular Phantom X1, the Mosquito was designed to comply with the US FAR 103 Ultralight Vehicles rules, including the category's maximum empty weight of 254 lb (115 kg). The aircraft has a standard empty weight of 252 lb (114 kg). It features a strut-braced or optionally cable-braced high-wing, a single-seat, open cockpit, tricycle landing gear and a single engine in tractor configuration.

The aircraft is made from aluminum tubing, with the flying surfaces covered in Dacron sailcloth. Its 29 ft (8.8 m) span wing was available in a strut-braced or cable-braced configuration, the cable bracing giving better negative g performance. On the cable-braced version the ground wires are supported by an inverted "V" kingpost. The aircraft is rated for load limits of +10/-6 g. The pilot is accommodated on a seat within a semi-enclosed fiberglass pod that includes a windshield. The standard engine is a Kawasaki 440 snowmobile engine of 35 hp (26 kW), mounted at the front of the main fuselage keel tube, above the pilot. The cruciform tail is mounted at the aft end of the same keel tube.

== Specifications (Mosquito) ==
Data from Cliche

General characteristics

- Crew: one
- Length: 15.1 ft (4.6 m)
- Wingspan: 29 ft (8.8 m)
- Wing area: 145 sq ft (13.5 m^{2})
- Empty weight: 252 lb (114 kg)
- Gross weight: 502 lb (228 kg)
- Fuel capacity: 5 U.S. gallons (19 L; 4.2 imp gal)
- Powerplant: 1 × Kawasaki 440 twin cylinder, two-stroke snowmobile engine, 35 hp (26 kW)

Performance

- Maximum speed: 63 mph (101 km/h, 55 kn)
- Cruise speed: 60 mph (97 km/h, 52 kn)
- Stall speed: 26 mph (42 km/h, 23 kn)
- Never exceed speed: 100 mph (160 km/h, 87 kn)
- g limits: +10/-6
- Rate of climb: 790 ft/min (4.0 m/s)
- Wing loading: 3.46 lb/sq ft (16.9 kg/m^{2})

== See also ==
Related development

- Phantom X1
