= Advanced Aviation Explorer =

Explorer

General information
- Type: Ultralight homebuilt aircraft
- National origin: United States
- Manufacturer: Advanced Aviation
- Status: In production (Toucan)

History
- First flight: 1990s
- Developed from: Maxair Drifter; Sport Flight Talon

The Advanced Aviation Explorer is a two-seat ultralight marketed in kit form, for amateur construction. It is a high-wing taildragger aircraft of pusher configuration with tandem seating.

== Design and development ==
The aircraft is a development of the Talon XP which in turn traces its lineage to the Maxair Drifter. The Explorer has been produced by a number of companies and under a variety of names.

The main advance over the Drifter is the Explorer's use of main wing struts and jury struts in place of cable bracing. Like all aircraft in this family they feature excellent visibility, especially from the front seat when the optional fibreglass cockpit pod is removed. As a result, the design is often employed as a camera platform. It can be flown on floats and has been used for banner towing.

Construction is of bolted aluminium tube, with the flying surfaces covered in pre-sewn Dacron envelopes. The kit takes about 150–250 hours to assemble.

The standard engine is the Rotax 582 of 64 hp (48 kW), with the four-stroke 80 hp (60 kW) Rotax 912 optional.

== Variants ==
Explorer
Initial version, derived from the Talon XP, but with struts in place of the cable-braced wing. Produced by Advanced Aviation, no longer in production.
Zephyr
Similar to the Explorer, but produced by Arnet Pereyra Inc, no longer in production. Also known as the Zephyr II, 40 reported flying in 1998/2001.
Toucan
New name for the aircraft when manufacturer Arnet Pereyra changed the company name to Aero Adventure Aviation, powered by a Rotax 582 of 64 hp (48 kW). In production, with 10 flying at the end of 2011.
Barracuda
Aero Adventure Aviation produced version powered by the 80 hp (60 kW) Rotax 912, 1,250 lb (567 kg) gross weight, optimized for amphibious floats. Out of production, with 1 flying at the end of 2007.

== Specifications (Toucan) ==
Data from Cliche

General characteristics

- Crew: one
- Capacity: one passenger
- Length: 22 ft 6 in (6.86 m)
- Wingspan: 29 ft 8 in (9.04 m)
- Height: 7 ft 0 in (2.13 m)
- Wing area: 156 sq ft (14.5 m^{2})
- Empty weight: 480 lb (218 kg)
- Gross weight: 1,050 lb (476 kg)
- Fuel capacity: 12 US gallons (45 litres)

Performance

- Maximum speed: 90 mph (140 km/h, 78 kn)
- Cruise speed: 73 mph (117 km/h, 63 kn)
- Stall speed: 33 mph (53 km/h, 29 kn)
- Range: 200 mi (320 km, 170 nmi)
- Service ceiling: 14,000 ft (4,300 m)
- Rate of climb: 1,100 ft/min (5.6 m/s)

== See also ==
Related development

- Lockwood Aircam
