= CFM Shadow =

British microlight aircraft

Shadow
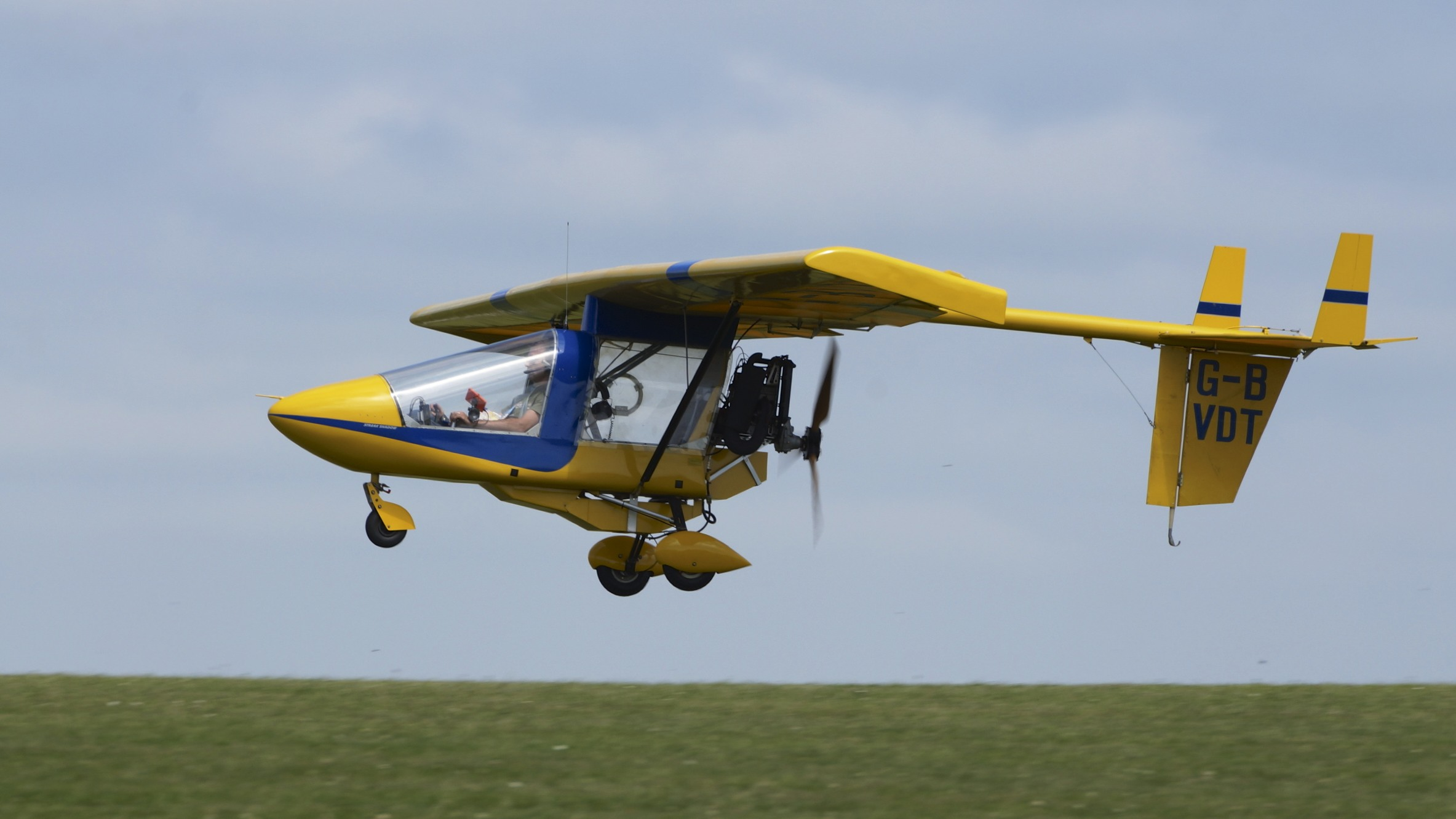
- A CFM Shadow at Compton Abbas Airfield, Dorset, England (June 2013)

General information
- Type: Two seat microlight
- National origin: United Kingdom
- Manufacturer: CFM Metalfax, later CFM Aviation
- Designer: David Cook
- Status: No longer in production
- Number built: all variants, more than 397

History
- First flight: 1983
- Retired: Early 2000s

The CFM Shadow is a British Microlight or Group A aircraft designed in the 1980s by David Cook who went on to run ‘Cook Flying Machines’ - where the aircraft was manufactured as a choice of a BMAA fully built machine or an LAA home build kit. It is of high wing, pusher, pod and boom layout and seats two. Around 400 have been built.

The lightweight monocoque fuselage structure is the result of a groundbreakingly innovative use of Fibrelam (aircraft flooring boards made using honeycomb cardboard cells sandwiched vertically between two resin plates) and epoxy resin to form bonded joints along with a basic metal tubing structure where extra strength and harmonic tolerance is needed.

The Shadow series is often referred to as being far ahead of its time due to its excellent performance figures, excellent safety record and highly innovative design.

== Design and development ==
The CFM Shadow is a two-seat ultralight pod and boom layout, either factory or home-built from kits. It is a high wing aircraft, with a short fuselage constructed of Fibrelam with a fibreglass nose cone and plywood sides, seating two in tandem in an enclosed cockpit. Dual control can be fitted and was standard on later models. The fuselage carries a tricycle undercarriage, with a castoring nosewheel; wheel fairings are an option. A Rotax two-cylinder two-stroke engine is mounted, exposed, immediately behind this pod in pusher configuration. The unusual empennage is carried on a fine aluminium boom and consists of an inverted narrow rectangular tail fin and the large rudder below the boom plus a swept tailplane with small tapered upright end plate fins. The elevators are full span, with electrically operated trim tabs. All rear surfaces have aluminium structures covered with polyester fabric.

The Shadow's slightly tapered wings, which have down-turned wingtips and leading edges which droop towards the tip, consist of plywood leading edge D-section boxes, built onto mixed plywood and aluminium web shear structures with styrofoam formers. The rear of the wing is covered in polyester fabric. The wing carries Frise ailerons and three position flaps. The shorter span wings of the later Streak variants are built in the same way, but have no gap between the ailerons and flaps.

The Shadow first flew in 1983, powered by a 53 hp (40 kW) Fuji EC44 Robin two-stroke engine. This was later replaced by a 40 hp (30 kW) Rotax 447 air-cooled two-stroke engine for the initial B series of Shadows. Several different Rotax engines have been used in the subsequent C, D and E series and the Streak and Star Streak developments. Production began in 1984.

The CFM Streak, initially known as the Streak Shadow flew for the first time in June 1988, with the first production aircraft flying that October. 120 had been delivered by June 2001. They were also licence built in South Africa, with the option of a Jabiru engine, an Australian design license built in South Africa.

The Star Streak variant first flew in 1992, with deliveries commencing in February 1994. By June 2001, 9 had been delivered.

== Operational history ==
By June 2001, 397 Shadows of all variants had been built for customers in 40 countries. 24 Streak Shadows were ordered by the Indian Air Force in the world's largest microlight contract; 18 of these had been delivered by June 2001. Laron Aviation Technologies acted as US distributor. There are currently (September 2010) 179 on the UK civil register, though not all have a Permit to Fly. In the UK, the Shadow series and the Streak SAL, but not the Streak SA or Star Streak, can be flown on a Microlight licence.

Many of the Shadows and Streaks have been used by clubs as trainers. The Shadow series D was offered as suitable for crop spraying and as for surveillance duties. It was also capable of flying off water when optional floats were fitted. A Shadow flown by David Cook provided the "dragon's eye views" used in the UK feature film Dragonheart of 1996.

Shadows and Streaks also made long journeys and set some class records. In 1987 Eve Jackson flew from the UK to Australia in a Shadow, a flight repeated the following year by Brian Milton. A later flight took a Shadow from the UK to Beijing. In 1983-4 Shadows set FAI world class records for speed over 3 km and for range and in 1990 set a UK class altitude record of 23,648 ft (7,208 m). This altitude was bettered in the same year when David Cook took a Streak to 27,066 ft (8,250 m), another UK record.

During the years that the Shadow and its variants were being produced, its manufacturer had a number of financial crises. Cook Flying Machines, trading as CFM Metalfax Ltd went into receivership in 1996, but was refinanced as CFM Aircraft Ltd. This in turn went into receivership in 2002 and the assets were bought up by Bella Aviation. Bella Aviation ceased trading after Shadows were grounded by the CAA, as a result of an issue with the original undercarriage.

== Variants ==
Shadow B
40 hp (30 kW) Rotax 447 air-cooled engine.
Shadow C
(1988) 50 hp (37 kW) Rotax 503 air-cooled engine. Streamlined struts.
Shadow D
65 hp (48 kW) Rotax 582 liquid-cooled engine. Dual control standard.
Shadow E
Similar to the D series but with either Rotax 582 or 80 hp (60 kW) Rotax 912 liquid-cooled engine, electric starter and long range tanks.
Streak SL
Rotax 582 or 912 engine. New foam/glass fibre wings of shorter span (28 ft 0 in or 8.53 m). 11 in (279 mm) longer than Shadow.
Streak SLA
Same as Streak SL, but with increased flap angles and other minor changes to lower stall speed, putting it into UK Microlight category.
Star Streak
Rotax 618 or 912 engine. Wings with same span as Streak but narrower chord. 14 in (356 mm) shorter than Streak with a wider cockpit.

== Specifications (Shadow D, Rotax 582UL) ==
Data from Pilot manuals and owner knowledge

General characteristics

- Crew: 2
- Length: 6.405 m (21 ft 0 in)
- Wingspan: 10.015 m (32 ft 11 in)
- Height: 2.490 m (8 ft 2 in)
- Wing area: 15.26 m^{2} (164 sq ft)
- Empty weight: 196 kg (432 lb) Maximum ZFW
- Gross weight: 386 kg (851 lb)
- Max takeoff weight: 386 kg (851 lb)
- Fuel capacity: 24L Main + 30L Slipper = 54L
- Powerplant: 1 × Rotax 582UL two-cylinder liquid-cooled two-stroke, 48 kW (64.4 hp)
- Propellers: 3-bladed Precision, 1.32 m (4 ft 4 in) diameter

Performance

- Maximum speed: 200 km/h (124 mph, 108 kn)
- Cruise speed: 111 km/h (70 mph, 60 kn) at 75% power
- Stall speed: 64 km/h (40 mph, 35 kn) Flaps Down
- Never exceed speed: 198 km/h (124 mph, 108 kn)
- Range: 346 km (215 mi, 187 nmi) 54L at 15LPH 60MPH TAS
- Maximum glide ratio: 13.2:1 at 50kt/57mph
- Rate of climb: 4.3 m/s (850 ft/min) At 60KIAS
- Wing loading: 25 kg/m^{2} (5.1 lb/sq ft)

== Specifications (Streak Shadow, Rotax 582UL) ==
Data from Pilot manuals and owner knowledge

General characteristics

- Crew: 2
- Length: 6.405 m (21 ft 0 in)
- Wingspan: 8.53 m (28 ft 0 in)
- Height: 2.490 m (8 ft 2 in) to top of fins
- Wing area: 13 m^{2} (140 sq ft)
- Empty weight: 192 kg (423 lb) Maximum ZFW
- Gross weight: 408 kg (899.5 lb) The narrow body microlight version is limited to 390kg MAUW because of stall speed exceeding microlight definition at the higher weight.
- Max takeoff weight: 408 kg (900 lb)
- Fuel capacity: 24L Main + 30L Slipper Tank = 54L
- Powerplant: 1 × Rotax 582UL two-cylinder liquid-cooled two-stroke, 48 kW (64.4 hp)
- Propellers: 3-bladed Precision, 1.32 m (4 ft 4 in) diameter

Performance

- Maximum speed: 224 km/h (140 mph, 121 kn)
- Cruise speed: 111 km/h (76 mph, 66 kn) at 75% power
- Stall speed: 66 km/h (41 mph, 36 kn) Flaps Down
- Never exceed speed: 225 km/h (140 mph, 121 kn)
- Range: 381 km (237 mi, 206 nmi) 54L at 15LPH 66MPH TAS MAUW
- Service ceiling: 3,000 m (10,000 ft) 29,000ft claimed but limited to 10,000ft breathable atmosphere
- Maximum glide ratio: 13.2:1 at 50kt/57mph
- Rate of climb: 4.3 m/s (850 ft/min) At 60KIAS
- Wing loading: 31 kg/m^{2} (6.3 lb/sq ft)
