= Phantom X1 =

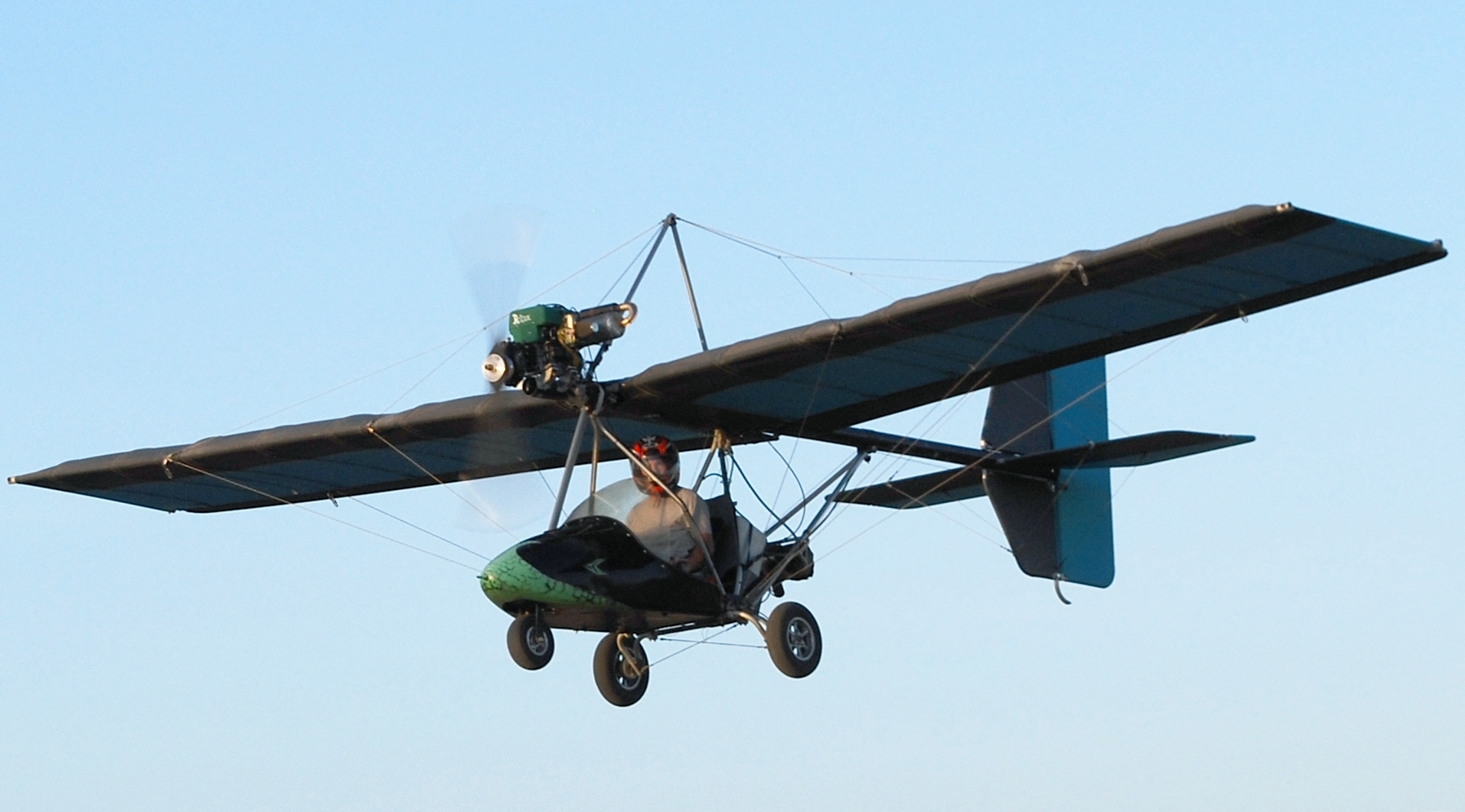

General information
- Type: Ultralight aircraft
- National origin: United States
- Manufacturer: Phantom Aeronautics
- Status: In production
- Number built: 1700 (as of 2000)

History
- Introduction date: 1982
- First flight: 1982
- Variants: Bell Sidewinder; Hy-Tek Hurricane 103; Golden Gate Mosquito; Worldwide Ultralite Spitfire

The Phantom X1 is a single-engined, tractor configuration, single seat, cable-braced high wing tricycle gear-equipped ultralight aircraft that is produced by Phantom Aeronautics of Three Rivers, Michigan and available in kit form.

The X1 design was intended to have an empty weight under 254 lb (115 kg) to fit into the FAR Part 103 ultralight category. There is also an X2 two seater which was designed as an ultralight trainer. Modernized models of the single and two-seaters use struts in place of the original cable-bracing.

== Design and development ==
The Phantom X1 was introduced at Sun 'n Fun in 1982, where it attracted a great deal of attention and won a major design award. The design was produced by a number of different manufacturers, including Phantom Aircraft of Kalamazoo, Michigan and has been widely copied. Derivative designs include the Bell Sidewinder, Hy-Tek Hurricane 103, Worldwide Ultralite Spitfire and the Golden Gate Mosquito.

The Phantom X1 is constructed from bolted-together aluminum tubing. The wings and tail surfaces are covered in Dacron sailcloth in the form of pre-sewn envelopes. The wings are wire-braced from an inverted V-shaped kingpost and feature full-span ailerons. There was also a factory option offered to allow the wings to fold for transport and storage. The engine is mounted on the front of the main tube, the tail being mounted on the far end of the same tube. The cockpit pod is made from fiberglass. The landing gear includes a steerable nosewheel.

The X1 was originally designed as an aerobatic aircraft and was tested to +9/-6.6 g before failure and carries operational limits of +6.6/-4.4 g. The full-span ailerons also give the X1 a fast roll-rate. For liability reasons the X1 was never marketed as an aerobatic design.

Factory options included brakes and a complete airframe parachute along with a variety of Rotax engines from 40 to 64 hp (30 to 48 kW). Original assembly time was rated by the manufacturer as 40 hours.

== Variants ==
X1
Single seat ultralight aircraft with aerobatic capabilities, first flown in 1982. Standard engine is the 40 hp (30 kW) Rotax 447, with the 50 hp (37 kW) Rotax 503 or 64 hp (48 kW) Rotax 582 as options. In the USA the aircraft could be completed as a FAR Part 103 ultralight vehicle or as an Experimental amateur-built aircraft. Still in production as the Phantom Classic.
X1E
Similar to the X1, but with an enclosed cockpit for all-weather flying. The cockpit features removable doors. Still in production as the Phantom Classic E.
X2
Two seat side-by-side configuration ultralight trainer, first flown in 1995, with first deliveries in February 1998. Folding wings were a factory option. Standard engine is the 50 hp (37 kW) Rotax 503 or 64 hp (48 kW) Rotax 582 as an option.
Phantom I
Single seat ultralight aircraft with struts in place of cable-bracing. Standard engine is the 50 hp (37 kW) Rotax 503 with the 64 hp (48 kW) Rotax 582 as an option.
Phantom I-E
Single seat ultralight aircraft with struts in place of cable-bracing and enclosed cockpit with removable doors. Standard engine is the 50 hp (37 kW) Rotax 503 with the 64 hp (48 kW) Rotax 582 as an option.
Phantom II
Two seat side-by-side configuration ultralight trainer with struts in place of cable-bracing. Engines include the 64 hp (48 kW) Rotax 582, 85 hp (63 kW) Jabiru 2200 or the 80 hp (60 kW) Rotax 912.

== Specifications (X1) ==
Data from Kitplanes

General characteristics

- Crew: one
- Length: 16 ft 8 in (5.08 m)
- Wingspan: 28 ft 6 in (8.69 m)
- Height: 8 ft 2 in (2.49 m)
- Wing area: 142 sq ft (13.2 m^{2})
- Empty weight: 250 lb (113 kg)
- Gross weight: 510 lb (231 kg)
- Fuel capacity: 5 US Gallons (19 litres)
- Powerplant: 1 × Rotax 447 twin-cylinder, single-ignition, two-stroke aircraft engine, 40 hp (30 kW)

Performance

- Maximum speed: 61 mph (98 km/h, 53 kn)
- Cruise speed: 55 mph (89 km/h, 48 kn)
- Stall speed: 26 mph (42 km/h, 23 kn)
- g limits: +9/-6.6 (ultimate), +6.6/-4.4 g (operational)
- Rate of climb: 800 ft/min (4.1 m/s)
- Wing loading: 3.59 lb/sq ft (17.5 kg/m^{2})

== See also ==
Aircraft of comparable role, configuration, and era

- Flightstar
