= Maytag Aircraft Building =

- U.S. National Register of Historic Places
- Colorado State Register of Historic Properties
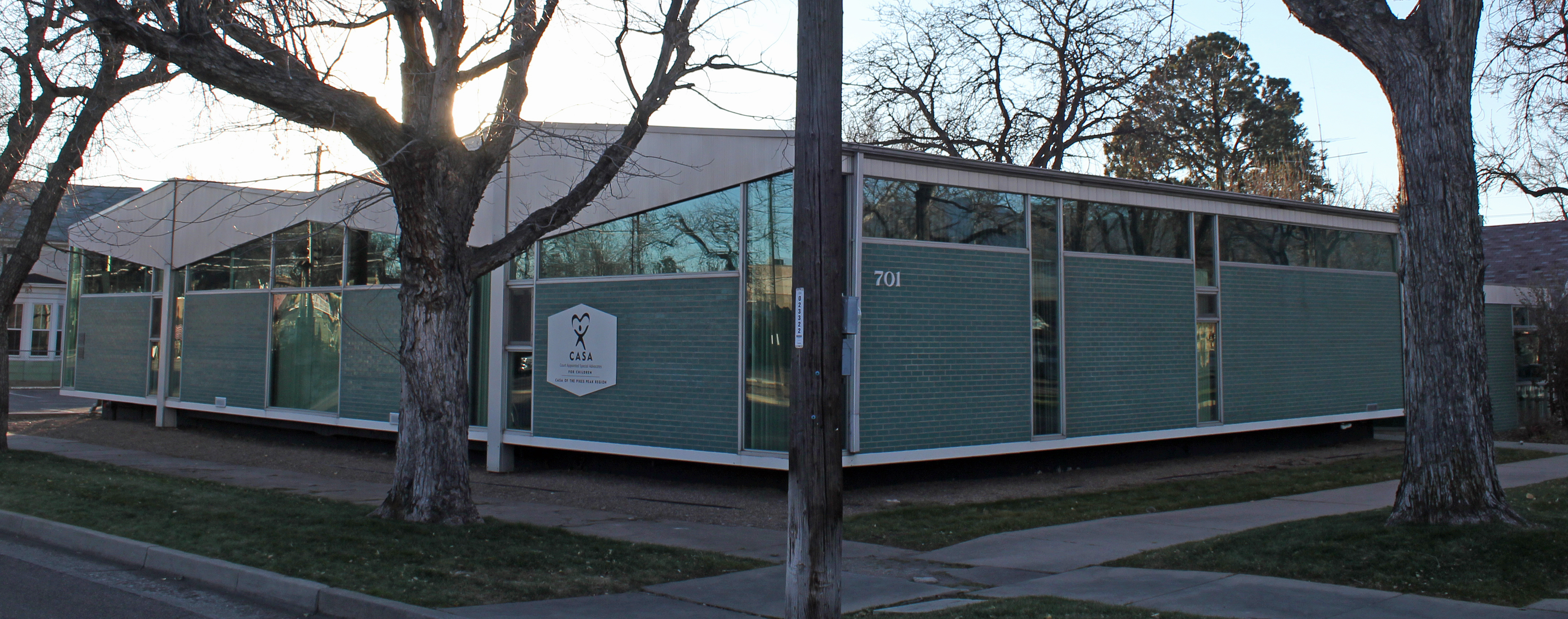

- Location within Colorado
- Location: 701 S, Cascade Avenue
- Coordinates: 38°49′27″N 104°49′30″W
- Built: 1957
- Architect: Dietz Lusk & John J. Wallace
- NRHP reference No.: 07001393
- Added to NRHP: January 16, 2008

The Maytag Aircraft Building is a historical building located on 701 S, Cascade Avenue in Colorado Springs, Colorado that was built in 1957. It was added to the US National Register of Historic Places (NRHP) on January 16, 2008.

The building's name is derived from a Colorado Springs company that was headquartered in the building from 1957 to 1992.
