= Arnet Pereyra Sabre II =

General information
- Type: Kit aircraft
- National origin: United States
- Manufacturer: Arnet Pereyra Inc
- Designer: Jose Cryrillo Veraga
- Number built: 3 (2001)

History
- Manufactured: 1992-c2003
- First flight: July 1992
- Developed from: Advanced Aeromarine Buccaneer

The Arnet Pereyra Sabre II is an American ultralight trainer aircraft. It is a two-seats in side-by-side configuration, conventional landing gear-equipped, strut-braced, high-wing aircraft that was produced by Arnet Pereyra Inc of Rockledge, Florida in kit form for amateur construction.

== Design and development ==
First flown in July 1992, the Sabre II is a land version of the highly successful 1984-vintage Arnet Pereyra Buccaneer, which the company produced at the same time. The Sabre II was developed from the two seat Buccaneer II by removing the wing-tip floats, replacing the retractable landing gear with leaf-spring fixed landing gear, shortening the wing by 12 in (30 cm) and replacing the boat-hull with a new fiberglass lower fuselage. The lower fuselage was more streamlined than the boat-hull and was lighter as well. Overall the Sabre II is more than 100 lb (45 kg) lighter than the Buccaneer II, with an empty weight of 480 lb (218 kg).

The Sabre is constructed from bolted aluminium tubing, covered in pre-sewn Dacron sailcloth envelopes. Standard aircraft dope and fabric is optional. The standard engine is the 64 hp (48 kW) liquid-cooled two-stroke Rotax 582 and the acceptable power range is 64 to 75 hp (48 to 56 kW). When in production a Ballistic Recovery Systems parachute was standard.

The Sabre II was not a commercial success, with only three reported delivered by 2001 and the aircraft was dropped from the company line when the company was renamed Aero Adventure Aviation circa 2003.

== Specifications (version) ==
Data from Cliche

General characteristics

- Crew: one
- Capacity: one passenger
- Length: 22 ft 4 in (6.81 m)
- Wingspan: 29 ft 8 in (9.04 m)
- Height: 7 ft 0 in (2.13 m)
- Wing area: 156 sq ft (14.5 m^{2})
- Empty weight: 480 lb (218 kg)
- Gross weight: 1,100 lb (499 kg)
- Fuel capacity: 12 US gallons (45litres)
- Powerplant: 1 × Rotax 582 , 64 hp (48 kW)
- Propellers: 2-bladed Ivoprop

Performance

- Maximum speed: 90 mph (140 km/h, 78 kn)
- Cruise speed: 70 mph (110 km/h, 61 kn)
- Stall speed: 32 mph (51 km/h, 28 kn)
- Range: 150 mi (240 km, 130 nmi)
- Service ceiling: 14,000 ft (4,300 m)
- Rate of climb: 500 ft/min (2.5 m/s)
- Wing loading: 7.05 lb/sq ft (34.4 kg/m^{2})
