= Air Magic Ultralights =

American aircraft manufacturer

- Company type: Privately held company
- Industry: Aerospace
- Fate: Out of business
- Headquarters: Houston, Texas, United States
- Products: Ultralight aircraft

Air Magic Ultralights was an American aircraft manufacturer based in Houston, Texas. When it existed the company specialized in the design and manufacture of ultralight aircraft.

In the late 1990s, the company produced both the Spitfire designed by Fred Bell and the Spitfire II two seater. Both designs were constructed from bolted aluminium tubing covered in Dacron fabric.

By 1998, the company reported that it had delivered a total of 582 aircraft.

== Aircraft ==
Summary of aircraft built by Air Magic Ultralights
Model name	First flight	Number built	Type
Air Magic Spitfire		514 (1998)	Single seat ultralight aircraft
Air Magic Spitfire II		68 (1998)	two seat ultralight trainer
