= Aero Adventure =

American flying boat manufacturer

Aero Adventure LLC
- Industry: Aerospace
- Headquarters: 915 Biscayne Blvd, Hangar A, DeLand, Florida, United States
- Products: Kit aircraft
- Website: www.sea-plane.com

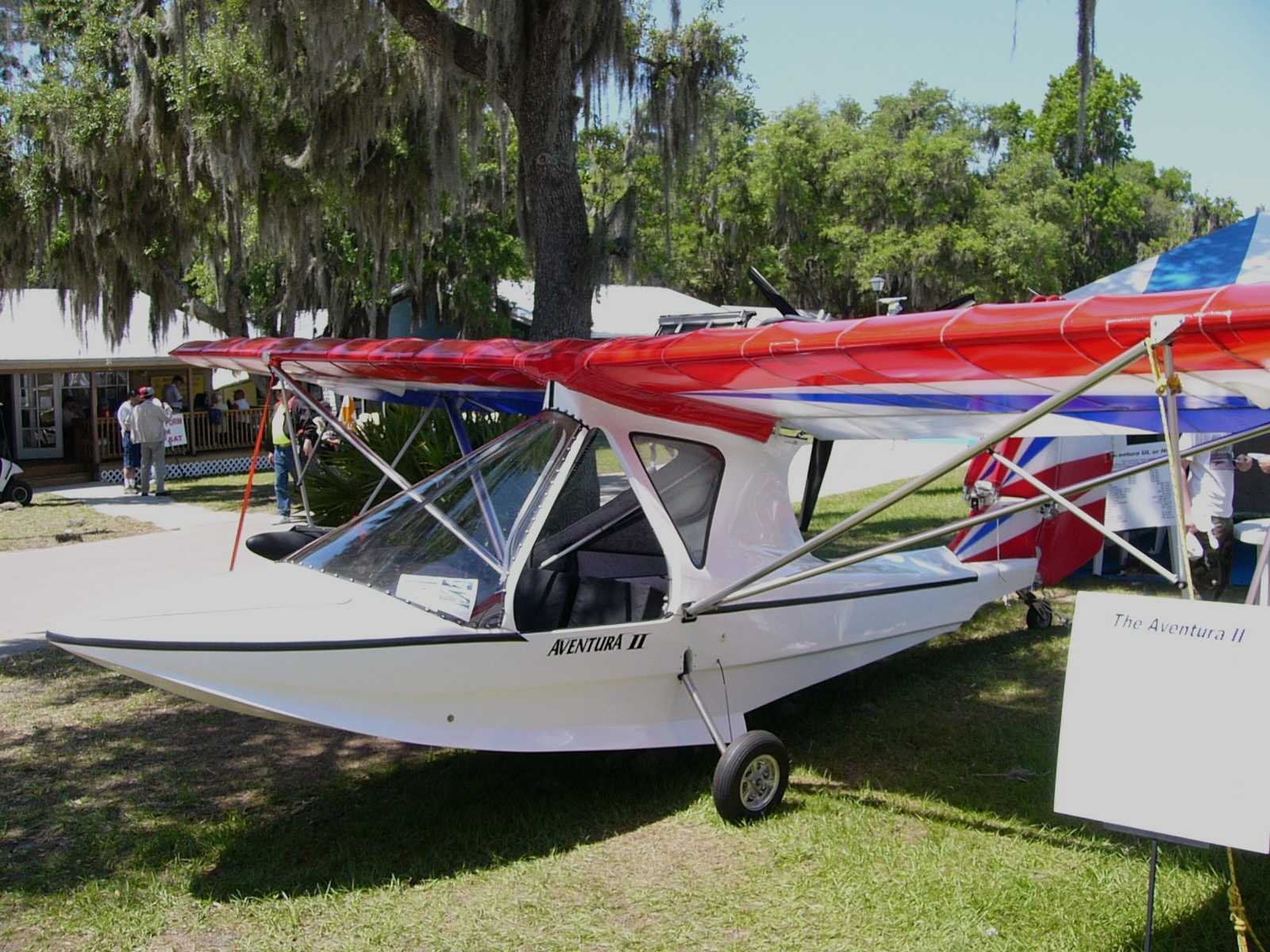
An Aventura II at Sun 'n Fun 2004

Aero Adventure LLC (formerly Aero Adventure Aviation and before that Arnet Pereyra Inc.) is an American aircraft manufacturer based in DeLand, Florida.

In 1996, the firm acquired the assets and production rights of Keuthan Aircraft.

== List of Aircraft ==
Aventura
Ultralight and experimental amphibious aircraft, marketed for homebuilding. Pusher propeller, high-wing configuration, single-seat, 40 hp (30 kW) Rotax 447 engine
Aventura II
Two-seat version of Aventura. 100 hp (75 kW) Rotax 912S engine
Aventura Sport
Two-seat version of Aventura. 64 hp (48 kW) Rotax 582 engine
Aventura XLR
Two-seat version with more streamlining. 100 hp (75 kW) Rotax 912S engine
Barracuda
Single-engine two-seat utility aircraft, convertible to fly with floats
Toucan
Ultralight training aircraft, marketed for homebuilding. Pusher propeller, high-wing configuration, two seats in tandem, 64 hp (48 kW) Rotax 582 engine
Pegasus
Single-engine two-seat utility aircraft, marketed for homebuilding. Composite construction, 115 hp (86 kW) Rotax 914 engine
Kappa 77 KP 2U-SOVA
Single-engine two-seat utility aircraft, for homebuilding. Designed in Czech Republic, marketed in USA by Aero Adventure
Sabre II
Two-seat land development of the Buccaneer, produced by Arnet Pereyra and not continued once the company name was changed to Aero Adventure Aviation
