= Worldwide Ultralite Skyraider S/S =

American ultralight aircraft

Skyraider S/S

General information
- Type: Ultralight aircraft
- National origin: United States
- Manufacturer: Worldwide Ultralite Industries
- Status: Production completed

History
- Introduction date: early 1980s

The Worldwide Skyraider S/S, also called the SkyRaider S/S, is an American ultralight aircraft that was designed and produced by Worldwide Ultralite Industries in the early 1980s. The aircraft was supplied as a kit for amateur construction.

== Design and development ==
The aircraft was designed to comply with the US FAR 103 Ultralight Vehicles rules, including the category's maximum empty weight of 254 lb (115 kg). The aircraft has a standard empty weight of 253 lb (115 kg). It features a cable-braced high-wing, a wide single-seat, open cockpit, tricycle landing gear and a single engine in pusher configuration.

The aircraft is made from aluminum tubing, with the wings and tail surfaces covered in Dacron sailcloth. Its 32 ft (9.8 m) span wing is cable braced from a single kingpost. The pilot is accommodated on a double-width seat designed for wide and heavy pilots or for two smaller people, to a maximum occupant weight of 400 lb (181 kg). The standard Kawasaki 440 40 hp (30 kW) engine is mounted at the trailing edge of the wing, with the rearwards-facing propeller in between the tail boom tubing.

== Specifications (Skyraider S/S) ==
Data from Cliche and the Virtual Ultralight Museum

General characteristics

- Crew: one
- Capacity: one passenger
- Wingspan: 32 ft (9.8 m)
- Wing area: 160 sq ft (15 m^{2})
- Empty weight: 253 lb (115 kg)
- Gross weight: 680 lb (308 kg)
- Fuel capacity: 4.5 U.S. gallons (17 L; 3.7 imp gal)
- Powerplant: 1 × Kawasaki 440 twin cylinder, two-stroke snowmobile engine, 40 hp (30 kW)

Performance

- Maximum speed: 51 mph (82 km/h, 44 kn)
- Cruise speed: 40 mph (64 km/h, 35 kn)
- Stall speed: 24 mph (39 km/h, 21 kn)
- Range: 105 mi (169 km, 91 nmi)
- Service ceiling: 12,000 ft (3,700 m)
- Rate of climb: 500 ft/min (2.5 m/s)
- Rate of sink: 300 ft/min (1.5 m/s)
