= Rotax 447 =

Austrian two-stroke aircraft engine

447
- Type: Piston aero-engine
- National origin: Austria
- Manufacturer: Rotax
- Major applications: Quad City Challenger I

The Rotax 447 is a 41.6 hp (31 kW), inline 2-cylinder, two-stroke aircraft engine, built by BRP-Rotax GmbH & Co. KG of Austria for use in ultralight aircraft.

== Design and development ==
The Rotax 447 is a development of the Rotax 377, increasing the power output from 26 kW (35 hp) to 29.5 kW (40 hp) by increasing the cylinder bore from 62 mm to 67.5 mm and the maximum rpm from 6500 to 6800. The modern 447 has a single breakerless, magneto capacitor-discharge ignition (CDI) system. Early (ca. 1988) models use a breaker point ignition system.

The Rotax 447 features piston-ported, air-cooled cylinder heads and cylinders, utilizing either a fan or free air for cooling. Lubrication is by use of pre-mixed fuel and oil. The engine can be equipped with either one or two piston-type float carburetors. The dual-carburetor version uses Bing model 84 carburetors. The single-carburetor version uses a Bing model 54 carburetor. An optional High Altitude Compensation kit is available. It is typically installed with an induction-pulse-driven diaphragm fuel pump to provide fuel pressure.

The engine's propeller drive is via a Rotax type B gearbox. The standard engine includes a muffler exhaust system with an extra after-muffler as optional. The standard starter is a recoil start type, with an electric starter optional. An integral alternating current generator producing 170 watts at 12 volts with external rectifier-regulator is optional. The engine includes an intake air filter and can be fitted with an intake silencer system.

The manufacturer acknowledges the design limitations of this engine, warning pilots:

"This engine, by its design, is subject to sudden stoppage. Engine stoppage can result in crash landings, forced landings or no power landings. Such crash landings can lead to serious bodily injury or death...This is not a certificated aircraft engine. It has not received any safety or durability testing, and conforms to no aircraft standards. It is for use in experimental, uncertificated aircraft and vehicles only in which an engine failure will not compromise safety. User assumes all risk of use, and acknowledges by his use that he knows this engine is subject to sudden stoppage...Never fly the aircraft equipped with this engine at locations, airspeeds, altitudes, or other circumstances from which a successful no-power landing cannot be made, after sudden engine stoppage. Aircraft equipped with this engine must only fly in DAYLIGHT VFR conditions."

== Variants ==
447 UL-1V
basic engine equipped with a single carburettor, 39.6 hp (30 kW) at 6800 rpm
447 UL-2V
basic engine equipped with two carburettors, 41.6 hp (31 kW) at 6800 rpm

== Applications ==
- Ace Magic
- Acrolite
- Aériane Sirocco
- AeroLites Bearcat
- ADI Bumble Bee
- Advanced Aeromarine Buccaneer SX
- Aero Adventure Aventura UL
- Aero-Works Aerolite 103
- Air Command Commander
- Air Creation Racer
- Airbike
- Airdrome Dream Fantasy Twin
- Air Sylphe 447
- AmeriPlanes Mitchell Wing A-10
- AmeriPlanes Mitchell Wing T-10
- AMS Flight Apis M motorglider
- AMS Flight Apis MC motorglider
- Antares A-10 Solo
- Antares MA-32
- APEV Pouchel II
- APEV Pouchel Classic
- APEV Pouchel Light
- APEV Scoutchel
- Apex Eco 6
- Aquilair Kid
- Arplast Micro'B
- Aviate Raptor
- Avid Champion
- ASAP Beaver SS
- Bagalini Bagalini
- Bagalini Baganfibio
- Bagalini Colombo
- BB Microlight 103
- Birdman Chinook 2S
- Calumet Snobird Explorer
- Capella SS
- Circa Reproductions Nieuport
- CFM Shadow
- CGS Hawk
- Chotia Weedhopper
- Cloudbaser Trikes Cloudbaser
- Concept Prowler
- Cosmik Chaser
- Cosmos Bison
- Cosmos Echo
- Dalby Pouchel
- Eipper Quicksilver
- Falcon East Peregrine Falcon
- Fisher Avenger
- Fisher FP-404 EXP
- Fisher FP-505 Skeeter
- Fisher FP-606 Sky Baby
- Fletcher Hercules
- Flightstar
- Fly Hard Trikes SkyCycle
- Flying K Sky Raider
- Freebird I
- Freewing Scorpion
- GibboGear Butterfly
- Golden Circle Air T-Bird
- Heldeberg Spirit 103
- Hipp's Superbirds J-5 Super Kitten
- Hipp's Superbirds Super Sportster
- Hipp's Superbirds Reliant SX
- Howland H-3 Pegasus
- Hummel CA-2
- Hy-Tek Hurricane 103
- Hy-Tek Ultra 103
- ISON Airbike
- J & J Ultralights Tukan
- JDT Hi-MAX
- Joplin Tundra
- Kolb Firefly
- Kolb Firestar
- Light Miniature Aircraft LM-1
- LiteWing Aircraft LiteTrike
- LiteWing Aircraft LiteWing
- Lockwood Drifter DR447
- Maxair Drifter DR447
- Loehle Spad XIII
- Loehle Sport Parasol
- LTD LO-120S
- Mariner Aircraft Mariner
- Mathews Mr Easy
- Midwest Hornet
- Mini-MAX
- M-Squared Breese
- Murphy Renegade
- Nike PUL 9
- North American Rotorwerks Pitbull Ultralight
- North Wing Maverick
- Paraplane WD-1 Wind Dancer
- Parascender I
- Phantom X1
- Progressive Aerodyne Stingray
- Pterodactyl Ascender
- Quad City Challenger UL
- Quander Micropfeil
- Quicksilver GT400
- Rans S-4 Coyote
- Rans S-14 Airaile
- Rolandas Kalinauskas RK-7 Orange
- Sabre 340
- Sabre Wildcat
- SlipStream Scepter
- Spacek SD-1 Minisport
- Spartan DFS Trike
- Sport Flight Talon
- Summit 103 Mini Breeze
- TC's Trikes Coyote
- Thor 1-A
- TeST TST-1 Alpin
- Titan Tornado
- Two Wings Mariner UL
- Ultracraft Calypso
- Vortech G-1
- Whittaker MW5 Sorcerer
- Wings of Freedom Flitplane
- Worldwide Ultralite Clipper

== Specifications (447) ==
Data from OPERATORS MANUAL FOR ENGINE TYPES 447, 503 & 582

=== General characteristics ===
- Type: two-stroke air-cooled aeroengine
- Bore: 67.5 mm (2.66 in)
- Stroke: 61 mm (2.4 in)
- Displacement: 426.5 cc (26.64 cu in)
- Dry weight: 26.8 kg (59 lb) (dry, no exhaust system)

=== Components ===
- Valvetrain: piston ports
- Fuel system: pneumatic pump pressurized
- Fuel type: regular autofuel
- Oil system: premixed in the fuel at 50:1 or oil injection
- Cooling system: fan or free air
- Reduction gear: Rotax 'B' gearbox: 2.00, 2.24, 2.58 ratios

=== Performance ===
- Power output: 30 kW (40 hp) at 6800 rpm
- Compression ratio: 9.6 (theoretical) 6.3 (effective)
- Fuel consumption: 11 litres/hr (3 US gph)
- Power-to-weight ratio: 1.12 kW/kg (0.68 hp/lb)
