= Keuthan Aircraft =

US aircraft manufacturer

- Headquarters: Merritt Island, Florida, United States

Keuthan Aircraft was a US aircraft manufacturer located in Merritt Island, Florida. The firm marketed ultralights in kit form. It ceased business in 1996 and its assets were acquired by Arnet Pereyra Inc.
