= Let-Mont =

Let-Mont s.r.o.
- Company type: Privately held company
- Industry: Aerospace
- Defunct: mid-2000s
- Fate: Out of business
- Headquarters: Vikýřovice, Czech Republic
- Products: Kit aircraft

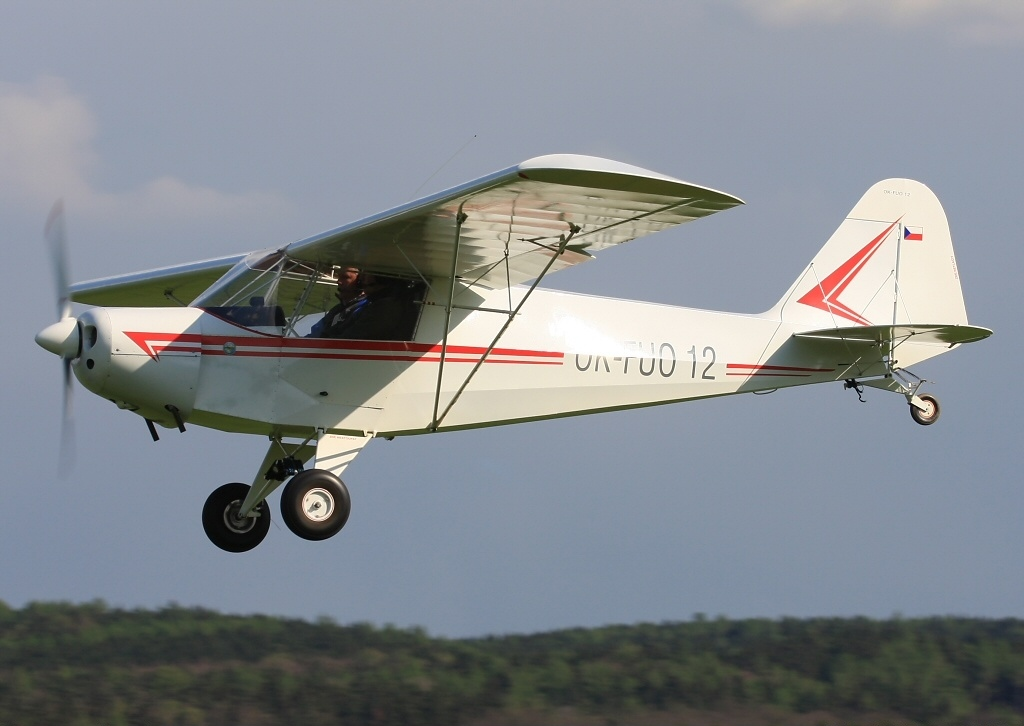
Let-Mont Tulak

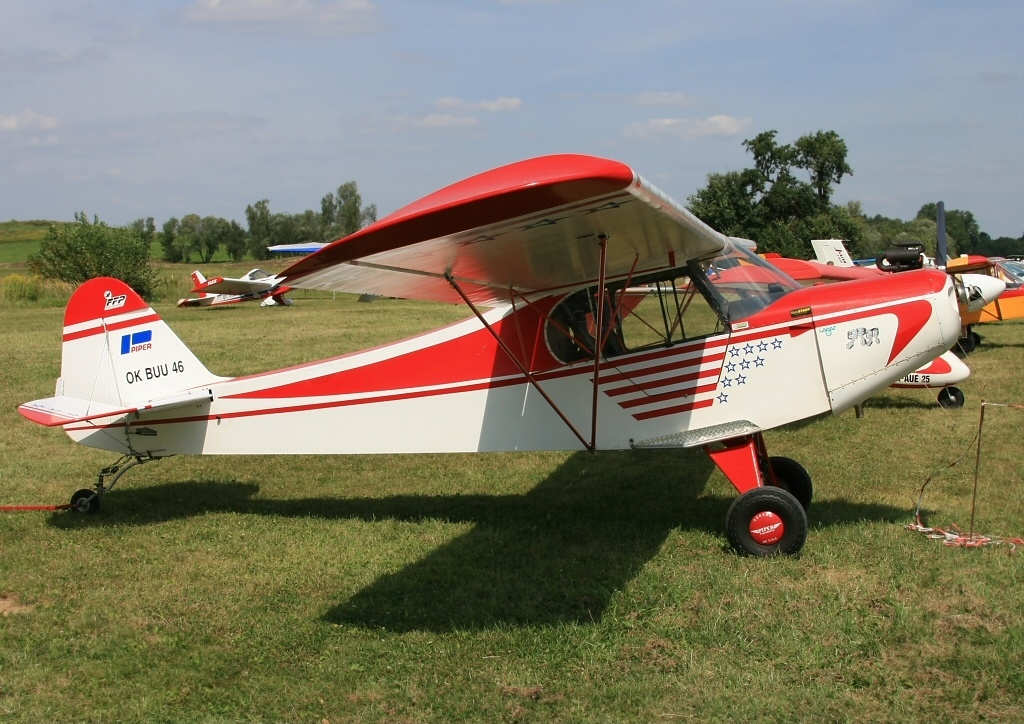
Let-Mont Piper UL

Let-Mont s.r.o. was a Czech aircraft manufacturer based in Vikýřovice. The company specialized in the design and manufacture of kit aircraft.

The company's two designs, the Tulak and the Piper UL, were based upon 1940s and 1950s Piper Aircraft models. The company appears to have gone out of business in the mid-2000s period.

Both aircraft models offered were designed to comply with the European Fédération Aéronautique Internationale microlight category and were sold ready-to-fly. They were also marketed in the United States as kits for the US homebuilt category, although it seems that none were ever constructed or flown in the US.

== Aircraft ==
Summary of aircraft built by Let-Mont
Model name	First flight	Number built	Type
Let-Mont Piper UL	1990s	25 (1998)	tandem seat kit aircraft
Let-Mont Tulak	1990s	10 (1998)	side-by-side configuration kit aircraft
