= XL2 =

XL2 may refer to:

- Canon XL-2, a camcorder model
- Emerald Coast XL2 Sport, American powered parachute design
- Liberty XL2, American light aircraft design
- XL2, an album by the Chinese Filipino singer Xian Lim
- XL2 Academy, the name used by the New York Excelsior for the video game Overwatch
