= Let-Mont Tulak =

Czech ultralight aircraft

Tulak
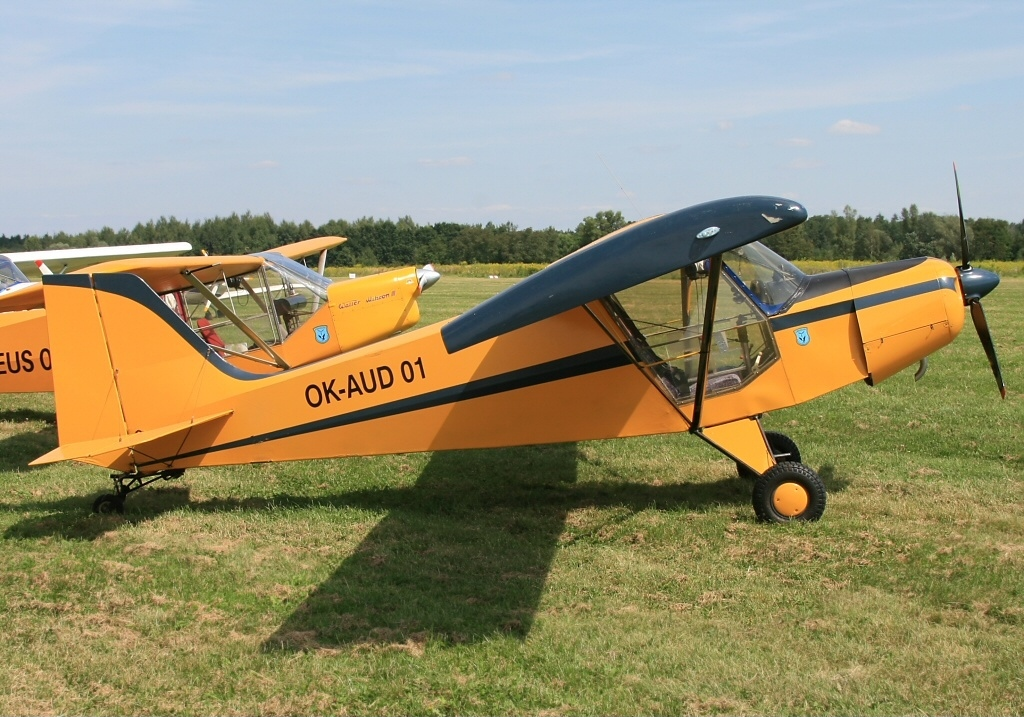

General information
- Type: Microlight aircraft
- National origin: Czech Republic
- Manufacturer: Let-Mont sro
- Status: Production completed
- Number built: 10 (1998)

The Let-Mont Tulak (English: rogue, wanderer or tramp) is a Czech microlight aircraft that was designed and produced by Let-Mont sro of Vikýřovice. When it was available the aircraft was supplied as a complete ready-to-fly-aircraft or a kit for amateur construction.

The aircraft was marketed in Austria and Germany under the name Amigo.

== Design and development ==
The aircraft was designed to comply with the European Fédération Aéronautique Internationale microlight category, including the category's maximum gross weight of 450 kg (992 lb). It was also marketed in the United States as a kit only for the US homebuilt category.

The Tulak features a strut-braced high-wing, a two-seats-in-side-by-side configuration enclosed cockpit accessed via doors, fixed conventional landing gear with wheel pants and a single engine in tractor configuration.

The aircraft fuselage is made from welded steel tubing, with the whole aircraft covered in doped aircraft fabric. Its 10.0 m (32.8 ft) span wing employs a Clark Y airfoil, mounts flaps, has a wing area of 13.01 m^{2} (140.0 sq ft) and is supported by "V" struts and jury struts. The standard engine used is the 50 hp (37 kW) Rotax 503 two-stroke and 80 hp (60 kW) Rotax 912 four-stroke powerplant, although a four-stroke BMW boxer engine was also available as a factory option

The Tulak has a typical empty weight of 230 kg (510 lb) and a gross weight of 450 kg (990 lb), giving a useful load of 220 kg (490 lb).

The manufacturer estimated the construction time from the supplied kit as 700 hours.

== Operational history ==
By 1998 the company reported that 10 aircraft were completed and flying.

In September 2014 no examples were registered in the United States with the Federal Aviation Administration.

== Specifications (Tulak) ==
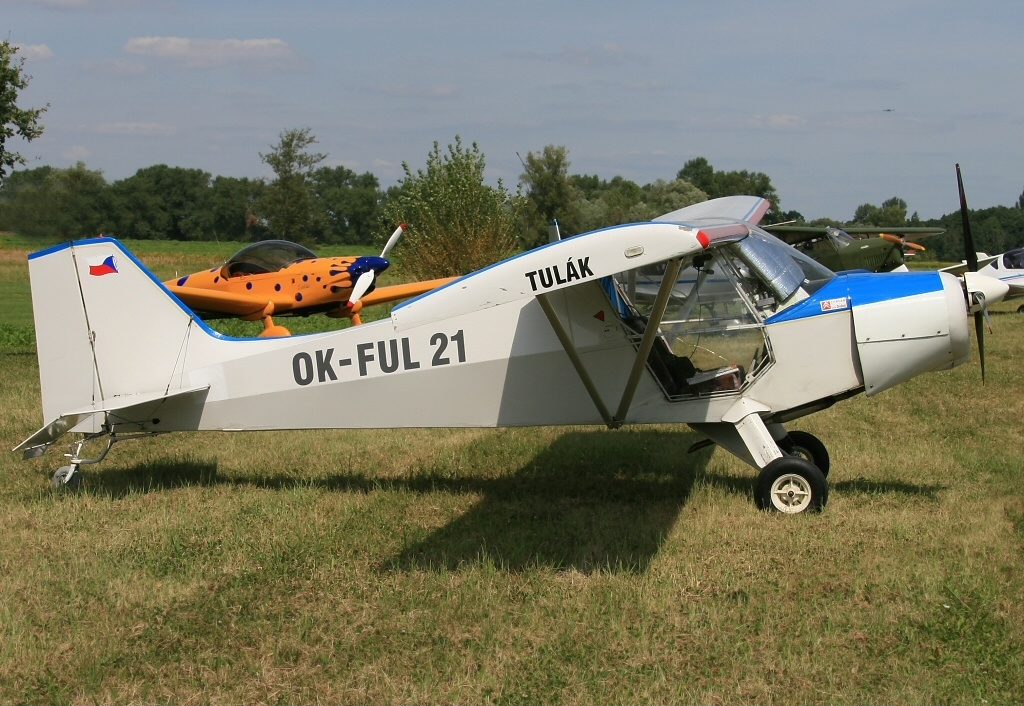
Let-Mont Tulak

Data from AeroCrafter and The Incomplete Guide to Airfoil Usage

General characteristics

- Crew: one
- Capacity: one passenger
- Wingspan: 9.60 m (31.50 ft)
- Wing area: 13.01 m^{2} (140.0 sq ft)
- Airfoil: Clark Y
- Empty weight: 230 kg (507 lb)
- Gross weight: 450 kg (992 lb)
- Powerplant: 1 × Rotax 503 twin cylinder, air-cooled, two stroke aircraft engine, 37 kW (50 hp)
- Propellers: 3-bladed composite

Performance

- Maximum speed: 150 km/h (93 mph, 81 kn)
- Cruise speed: 109 km/h (68 mph, 59 kn)
- Stall speed: 43 km/h (27 mph, 23 kn) flaps down
- g limits: +6/-6
- Rate of climb: 2.8 m/s (550 ft/min)
- Wing loading: 35 kg/m^{2} (7.1 lb/sq ft)
