= Seair =

Seair may refer to:

- Seair Seaplanes, an airline based in Richmond, British Columbia, Canada
- South East Asian Airlines, also called SEAir Inc
- World Seair Corp Seair, ultralight flying boat
