= Cuby =

This may refer to:

- Aces High Cuby, a small sportsplane
- Cuby, Cornwall, a place in Cornwall, England
- Saint Cuby, a 6th-century Cornish saint who worked largely in Cornwall and North Wales
- Cuby & the Blizzards, a Dutch blues group
