= 21st Century Airships SPAS 13 =

Canadian semi-rigid airship

SPAST 13

General information
- Type: Semi-rigid helium airship
- National origin: Canada
- Manufacturer: 21st Century Airships

History
- First flight: 13 May 1994

The 21st Century Airships SPAS 13 is a Canadian semi-rigid helium airship demonstrator designed and built by 21st Century Airships of Newmarket, Ontario.

== Design and development ==
The SPAS 13 was a development of the earlier SPAS 1 and was designed to demonstrate the advantages of a spherical airship. The 43 ft (13.11 m) diameter spherical envelope is made of Spectra fabric with an inner helium containing envelope of Mylar film reinforced with Kevlar. The two-seat cockpit is internal to the envelope with panoramic windows in the envelope to provide an external view.

The SPAS 13 is powered by two 50 hp (37 kW) Rotax 503 piston engines on external struts, four vanes behind each engine are used to provide control by deflecting the thrust.

== Specifications ==
Data from

General characteristics

- Crew: 1 pilot
- Capacity: 1 passenger
- Diameter: 43 ft 0 in (13.11 m)
- Height: 45 ft 0 in (13.72 m) includes landing gear
- Empty weight: 1,596 lb (724 kg)
- Max takeoff weight: 2,403 lb (1,090 kg)
- Powerplant: 2 × Rotax 503 piston engine, 50 hp (37 kW) each
- Propellers: 3-bladed, 6 ft 0 in (1.83 m) diameter

Performance

- Maximum speed: 30 mph (48 km/h, 26 kn)
- Cruise speed: 19.0 mph (30.6 km/h, 16.5 kn)
