= Tucano =

Tucano may refer to:

- Tucano people, indigenous people of Brazil and Colombia
- The Tucano language of Brazil and Colombia, part of the Tucanoan family of languages
- Embraer EMB 312 Tucano, a Brazilian turboprop training aircraft
  - Short Tucano – licence-built version for the Royal Air Force
  - Embraer EMB 314 Super Tucano – upgraded version
- Flying Legend Tucano Replica, an Italian light-sport aircraft
- Flylab Tucano, an Italian ultralight aircraft
- The Portuguese name for the toucan
- A member or supporter of the Brazilian Social Democracy Party
- Tucano, Brazil, a municipality in the state of Bahia in the North-East region of Brazil.
- Tucanos, Restaurant, a growing Brazilian based restaurant in various locations of the United States.
