= Let-Mont Piper UL =

Czech ultralight aircraft

Piper UL
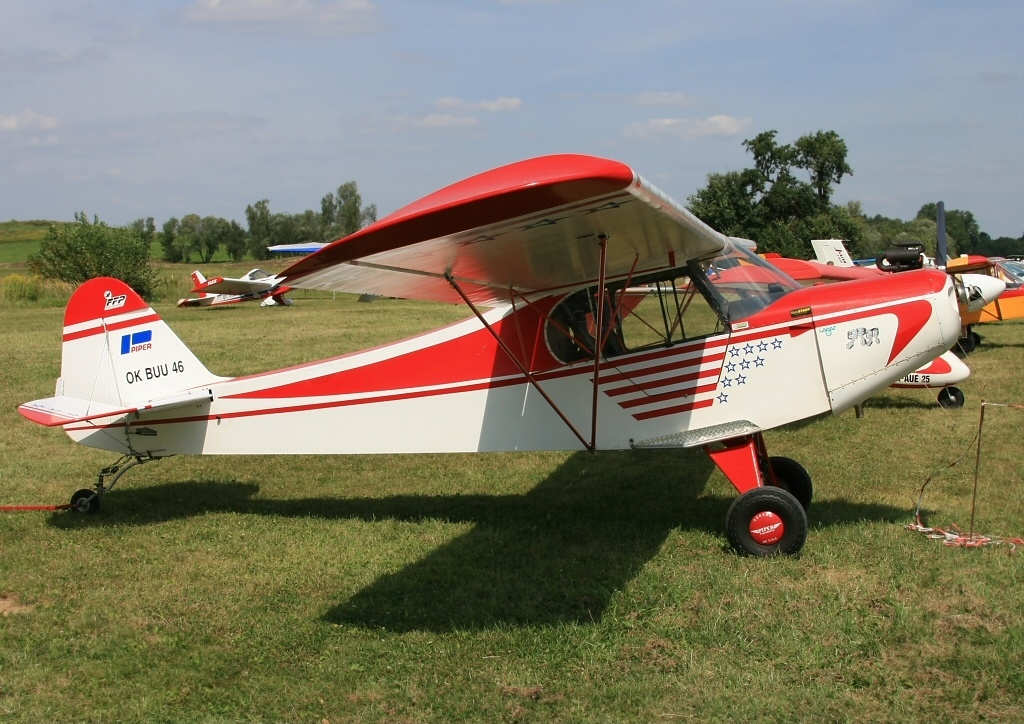

General information
- Type: Microlight aircraft
- National origin: Czech Republic
- Manufacturer: Let-Mont sro
- Status: Production completed
- Number built: 25 (1998)

History
- Developed from: Piper PA-15 Vagabond

The Let-Mont Piper UL is a Czech microlight aircraft that was designed and produced by Let-Mont sro of Vikýřovice. When it was available the aircraft was supplied as a complete ready-to-fly-aircraft or a kit for amateur construction.

== Design and development ==
The aircraft was designed to comply with the European Fédération Aéronautique Internationale microlight category, including the category's maximum gross weight of 450 kg (992 lb). It was also marketed in the United States as a kit only for the US homebuilt category.

The Piper UL is based on early Piper Aircraft designs, such as the Piper PA-15 Vagabond, which it resembles. It features a strut-braced high-wing, a two-seats-in-side-by-side configuration enclosed cockpit accessed via doors, fixed conventional landing gear with wheel pants and a single engine in tractor configuration.

The aircraft fuselage is made from welded steel tubing, with the whole aircraft covered in doped aircraft fabric. Its 9.4 m (30.8 ft) span wing, mounts flaps, has a wing area of 12.7 m^{2} (137 sq ft) and is supported by "V" struts and jury struts. The standard engine used is the 50 hp (37 kW) Rotax 503 two-stroke powerplant.

The Piper UL has a typical empty weight of 250 kg (550 lb) and a gross weight of 450 kg (990 lb), giving a useful load of 200 kg (440 lb).

The manufacturer estimated the construction time from the supplied kit as 800 hours.

== Operational history ==
By 1998 the company reported that 25 aircraft were completed and flying.

In September 2014 no examples were registered in the United States with the Federal Aviation Administration.

== Specifications (Piper UL) ==
Data from AeroCrafter

General characteristics

- Crew: one
- Capacity: one passenger
- Length: 6.08 m (19.95 ft)
- Wingspan: 9.40 m (30.84 ft)
- Wing area: 12.70 m^{2} (136.7 sq ft)
- Empty weight: 250 kg (551 lb)
- Gross weight: 450 kg (992 lb)
- Powerplant: 1 × Rotax 503 twin cylinder, air-cooled, two stroke aircraft engine, 37 kW (50 hp)
- Propellers: 3-bladed composite

Performance

- Maximum speed: 160 km/h (100 mph, 87 kn)
- Cruise speed: 121 km/h (75 mph, 65 kn)
- Stall speed: 55 km/h (34 mph, 30 kn) flaps down
- g limits: +6/-6
- Rate of climb: 2.5 m/s (500 ft/min)
- Wing loading: 35 kg/m^{2} (7.2 lb/sq ft)
