= C122 =

C-122 may refer to one of the following aircraft

- YC-122 Avitruc, a prototype transport aircraft developed for the USAF
- Chadwick C-122, a helicopter
