= Fly Air Trike Moster =

Bulgarian ultralight trike

Trike Moster

General information
- Type: Ultralight trike
- National origin: Bulgaria
- Manufacturer: Fly Air Limited
- Status: In production (2018)

The Fly Air Trike Moster is a Bulgarian ultralight trike that was designed and produced by Fly Air Limited of Trudovec. The design is supplied complete and ready-to-fly.

== Design and development ==
The Trike Moster was designed to comply with the Fédération Aéronautique Internationale microlight category, the German 120 kg class and the US FAR 103 Ultralight Vehicles rules. The design has a standard empty weight of 32 kg (71 lb).

The aircraft design features a cable-braced hang glider-style high-wing, weight-shift controls, a single-seat open cockpit without a cockpit fairing, tricycle landing gear and a single engine in pusher configuration.

The aircraft is made from square steel tubing, with its single or double surface wing covered in Dacron sailcloth. The wing is supported by a single tube-type kingpost and uses an "A" frame weight-shift control bar. The powerplant is a single-cylinder, air-cooled, two-stroke, single-ignition 25 hp (19 kW) Vittorazi Moster 185 engine, although other engines can also be fitted.

The aircraft has an empty weight of 32 kg (71 lb) without the wing and a gross weight of 200 kg (441 lb). The airframe was designed to be folded up and ground transported in the trunk of an automobile, with the wing carried on the roof.

A number of different wings can be fitted to the basic carriage as it was designed to accept most standard hang gliding wings.

== Specifications (Trike Moster) ==
Data from Tacke

General characteristics

- Crew: one
- Wing area: 19 m^{2} (200 sq ft)
- Empty weight: 32 kg (71 lb)
- Gross weight: 200 kg (441 lb)
- Fuel capacity: 12 litres (2.6 imp gal; 3.2 US gal)
- Powerplant: 1 × Vittorazi Moster 185 single-cylinder, air-cooled, two stroke aircraft engine, 19 kW (25 hp)
- Propellers: 2-bladed fixed pitch, wooden

Performance

- Wing loading: 10.5 kg/m^{2} (2.2 lb/sq ft)

== See also ==
- Fly Air Swallow
