= Cosmos Bison =

French ultralight trike

Bison

General information
- Type: Ultralight trike
- National origin: France
- Manufacturer: Cosmos ULM
- Status: In production

History
- Variant: Cosmos Phase II

The Cosmos Bison, also called the Cosmos Bidulm, is a French two-seat, ultralight trike that is produced by Cosmos ULM. The aircraft is only supplied as a completed aircraft and is not available as a kit.

== Design and development ==
The Bison was designed to comply with the European Fédération Aéronautique Internationale microlight classification. It features a cable-braced hang glider-style high-wing, weight-shift controls, a two-seats-in-tandem open cockpit, tricycle landing gear and a single engine in pusher configuration.

The aircraft wing is made from bolted-together aluminum tubing and covered in Dacron sailcloth. A number of different wings are available for the Bison. The wing is supported by a single tube-type kingpost and uses an "A" frame control bar. Optional equipment includes a cockpit fairing and wheel pants. Engines used are the 37 kW (50 hp) Rotax 503 and 30 kW (40 hp) Rotax 447 twin cylinder, two-stroke powerplants. The landing gear is cable-braced, which allows a folding design for ground transport or storage.

The Bison was later developed into the Cosmos Phase II, by adding larger seats, new landing gear shock absorbers and a redesigned engine mount to reduce vibration. In 2012 the Bison remained in production alongside the Phase II and Phase III, offering a simpler, lighter and less expensive two seater than the newer models.

== Specifications (Bison) ==
Data from Bertrand

General characteristics

- Crew: one
- Capacity: one passenger
- Wingspan: 10.6 m (34 ft 9 in)
- Wing area: 19 m^{2} (200 sq ft)
- Empty weight: 123 kg (271 lb)
- Gross weight: 400 kg (882 lb)
- Fuel capacity: 40 litres (8.8 imp gal; 11 US gal)
- Powerplant: 1 × Rotax 447 twin cylinder, air-cooled two-stroke aircraft engine, 30 kW (40 hp)
- Propellers: 2-bladed wooden

Performance

- Maximum speed: 85 km/h (53 mph, 46 kn)
- Cruise speed: 60 km/h (37 mph, 32 kn)
- Stall speed: 40 km/h (25 mph, 22 kn)
- Rate of climb: 2.5 m/s (490 ft/min)
