= Eurofly Fire Cat =

Italian ultralight aircraft

Fire Cat

General information
- Type: Ultralight aircraft
- National origin: Italy
- Manufacturer: Eurofly srl
- Status: Production completed

The Eurofly Fire Cat is an Italian ultralight aircraft that was designed and produced by Eurofly srl of Galliera Veneta. Now out of production, when it was available the aircraft was supplied as a complete ready-to-fly-aircraft or as a kit for amateur construction.

== Design and development ==
The Fire Cat was designed to comply with the Fédération Aéronautique Internationale microlight category, including the category's maximum gross weight of 450 kg (992 lb). The Fire Cat features a strut-braced high-wing, a two-seats-in-side-by-side configuration enclosed cockpit, fixed tricycle landing gear with wheel pants and a single engine in pusher configuration.

The aircraft is made from aluminum tubing, with its flying surfaces covered in Dacron sailcloth envelopes. Its 31.50 ft (9.6 m) span wing lacks flaps and has a wing area of 172.1 sq ft (15.99 m^{2}). Each wing is supported by two parallel struts with jury struts. The standard engine used is the 50 hp (37 kW) Rotax 503 two-stroke powerplant with standard electric start.

The Fire Cat has a typical empty weight of 217 kg (478 lb) and a gross weight of 450 kg (990 lb), giving a useful load of 233 kg (514 lb). With full fuel of 49 litres (11 imp gal; 13 US gal) the payload for pilot, passengers and baggage is 203 kg (448 lb).

== Specifications (Fire Cat) ==
Data from AeroCrafter

General characteristics

- Crew: one
- Capacity: one passenger
- Length: 6.20 m (20.33 ft)
- Wingspan: 9.60 m (31.50 ft)
- Wing area: 15.99 m^{2} (172.1 sq ft)
- Empty weight: 218 kg (480 lb)
- Gross weight: 450 kg (992 lb)
- Fuel capacity: 49 litres (11 imp gal; 13 US gal)
- Powerplant: 1 × Rotax 503 twin cylinder, air-cooled, two stroke aircraft engine, 37 kW (50 hp)
- Propellers: 2-bladed composite

Performance

- Maximum speed: 130 km/h (81 mph, 70 kn)
- Cruise speed: 90 km/h (56 mph, 49 kn)
- Stall speed: 45 km/h (28 mph, 24 kn)
- Rate of climb: 5.00 m/s (984 ft/min)
- Wing loading: 28.1 kg/m^{2} (5.75 lb/sq ft)
