= Cosmos Phase II =

French ultralight trike

Phase II and III
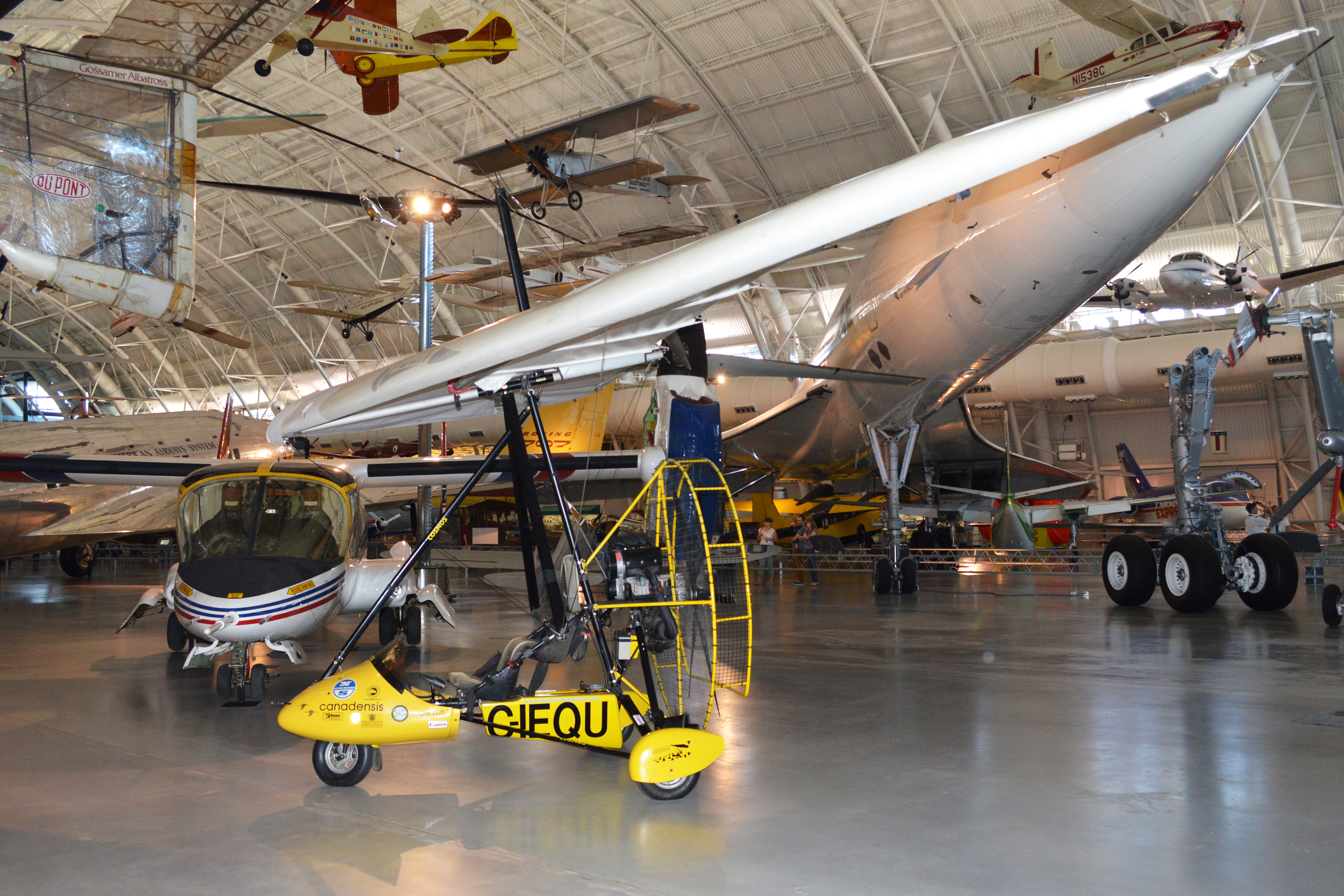

General information
- Type: Ultralight trike
- National origin: France; Mexico
- Manufacturer: Cosmos ULM; Cosmos Ultralight
- Status: In production

History
- Developed from: Cosmos Bison

The Cosmos Phase II and Phase III are a series of French two-seat flying wing ultralight trikes that were produced by Cosmos ULM of Fontaine-lès-Dijon and now by Cosmos Ultralight of Puente de Ixtla, Mexico. The aircraft are supplied as factory completed aircraft and are not available as kits.

== Design and development ==
The series was developed from the earlier Cosmos Bison, adding larger seats, landing gear suspension and a new engine mounting system to reduce vibration. It was designed to comply with European Fédération Aéronautique Internationale microlight classification. It features a cable-braced hang glider-style high-wing, weight-shift controls, a two-seats-in-tandem open cockpit, tricycle landing gear and a single engine in pusher configuration.

The aircraft wing is made from bolted-together aluminum tubing, with its single, or optionally double-surface, wing covered in Trilam sailcloth. The wing is supported by a single tube-type kingpost and uses an "A" frame control bar. A variety of wings and engines can be fitted, each with a different model designation. When equipped with a 37 kW (50 hp) Rotax 503 or 48 kW (64 hp) Rotax 582 two-stroke engine, the aircraft is designated as a Phase II, and when equipped with a 60 to 75 kW (80 to 101 hp) Rotax 912 four-stroke engine, it is designated as a Phase III. Wings used include the double surface Top 12.9, Top 14.9, Chronos 16, and the single surface Zoom 19. The wing designation reflects the area in square metres. The landing gear features gas-filled shock absorber suspension on all three wheels, nose wheel steering and a nose wheel-mounted drum brake, as well as a parking brake. The aircraft can be disassembled for storage or ground transportation, taking half an hour for set-up.

The series has a wide range of options, including a glider aero-tow kit, floats, salt-water protection, ballistic parachute and dual controls for flight training.

== Variants ==
The models in the line reflect combinations of wings and engines fitted. Documented versions include:

Phase II 503 Chronos 16
Equipped with a 37 kW (50 hp) Rotax 503 powerplant and a Chronos 16 double surface wing. Cruise speed 90 km/h (56 mph).
Phase II 582 Top 12.9
Equipped with a 48 kW (64 hp) Rotax 582 powerplant and a Top 12.9 double surface wing. Cruise speed 100 km/h (62 mph).
Phase III 912 Top 14.9
Equipped with a 60 kW (80 hp) Rotax 912 powerplant and a Top 14.9 double surface wing. Cruise speed 100 km/h (62 mph).

== Specifications (Phase II) ==
Data from Cliche and Purdy

General characteristics

- Crew: one
- Capacity: one passenger
- Length: 2.1 m (7 ft)
- Wingspan: 10 m (33 ft)
- Wing area: 15.2 m^{2} (164 sq ft)
- Empty weight: 136 kg (300 lb)
- Gross weight: 363 kg (800 lb)
- Fuel capacity: 53 litres (12 imp gal; 14 US gal)
- Powerplant: 1 × Rotax 503 twin cylinder, two-stroke, air-cooled aircraft engine

Performance

- Maximum speed: 130 km/h (80 mph, 70 kn)
- Cruise speed: 105 km/h (65 mph, 56 kn)
- Stall speed: 45 km/h (28 mph, 24 kn)
- Range: 523 km (325 mi, 282 nmi)
- Service ceiling: 5,500 m (18,000 ft)
- Rate of climb: 5.1 m/s (1,000 ft/min)
