= Sapphire Aircraft Australia Sapphire LSA =

Australian ultralight aircraft

Sapphire LSA

General information
- Type: Ultralight aircraft
- National origin: Australia
- Manufacturer: Sapphire Aircraft Australia
- Status: Production completed (2012)

History
- Introduction date: late 1980s

The Sapphire Aircraft Australia Sapphire LSA is an Australian ultralight aircraft that was designed and produced by Sapphire Aircraft Australia. It was introduced in the late 1980s and still in production as recently as 2010, but now out of production. The Sapphire was supplied as complete ready-to-fly-aircraft.

== Design and development ==
The Sapphire complies with the Fédération Aéronautique Internationale microlight rules. It features a strut-braced high-wing, a single-seat enclosed cockpit with a bubble canopy or, optionally, an open cockpit with a windshield, fixed conventional landing gear and a single engine in pusher configuration.

The aircraft is made from fibreglass, epoxy resin and extruded foam. Its 8.84 m (29.0 ft) span wing has an area of 9.132 m^{2} (98.30 sq ft). The standard engine fitted is the 50 hp (37 kW) Rotax 503 two-stroke powerplant.

In the early 2010s period a two-seat version and a motorglider variant were being developed.

== Specifications (Sapphire LSA) ==
Data from Bayerl

General characteristics

- Crew: one
- Wingspan: 8.84 m (29 ft 0 in)
- Wing area: 9.132 m^{2} (98.30 sq ft)
- Empty weight: 210 kg (463 lb)
- Gross weight: 360 kg (794 lb)
- Fuel capacity: 58 litres (13 imp gal; 15 US gal)
- Powerplant: 1 × Rotax 503 twin cylinder, air-cooled, two stroke aircraft engine, 37 kW (50 hp)
- Propellers: 2-bladed wooden

Performance

- Maximum speed: 181 km/h (112 mph, 98 kn)
- Cruise speed: 165 km/h (103 mph, 89 kn)
- Stall speed: 38 km/h (24 mph, 21 kn)
- Rate of climb: 5.8 m/s (1,140 ft/min)
- Wing loading: 39.4 kg/m^{2} (8.1 lb/sq ft)
