= Las Brisas Mohawk =

American homebuilt aircraft

Mohawk

General information
- Type: Homebuilt aircraft
- National origin: United States
- Manufacturer: Las Brisas Sales
- Status: Plans no longer available (2014)

History
- Developed from: Avid Flyer

The Las Brisas Mohawk is an American homebuilt aircraft that was designed and produced by Las Brisas Sales of Ozark, Missouri. When it was available the aircraft was supplied in the form of plans for amateur construction.

== Design and development ==
Based upon the Avid Flyer, which it greatly resembles, the Mohawk features a strut-braced high wing, a two-seats-in-side-by-side configuration enclosed cockpit accessed via doors, fixed conventional landing gear and a single engine in tractor configuration.

The aircraft is made from metal tubing, with its flying surfaces and fuselage covered doped aircraft fabric. Its 30.00 ft (9.1 m) span wing features Junkers flaperons, has a wing area of 124.5 sq ft (11.57 m^{2}) and is supported by "V" struts with jury struts. The plans specify standard hydraulic brakes, a steerable tailwheel and wings that fold for ground transport or storage. The standard engine used is the 50 hp (37 kW) Rotax 503 two-stroke powerplant, which gives a standard day, sea level takeoff distance of 100 ft (30 m) and a landing roll of 150 ft (46 m).

The Mohawk has a typical empty weight of 450 lb (200 kg) and a gross weight of 1,000 lb (450 kg), giving a useful load of 550 lb (250 kg). With full fuel of 12 U.S. gallons (45 L; 10.0 imp gal) the payload for pilot, passenger and baggage is 478 lb (217 kg).

The manufacturer estimates the construction time from the supplied plans as 900 hours. In 1998 the designer indicated that the aircraft could be completed for US$6,500 excluding labor.

Modern Interest and Legacy

Although the Las Brisas Mohawk is no longer available as of 2014, its design continues to capture the interest of homebuilt aircraft enthusiasts. Its combination of simplicity, affordability, and versatility made it an attractive option for amateur builders during its production period. The Mohawk’s capability to be stored in compact spaces thanks to its foldable wings remains a standout feature, appealing to hobbyists with limited hangar space. Additionally, its low operating costs and ease of assembly make it a frequent topic in online forums and communities dedicated to experimental aviation.

Potential for Revival

The Mohawk’s solid performance characteristics, such as its 1,200 ft/min rate of climb and 320-mile range, still hold relevance for light aircraft builders today. There has been ongoing speculation within the homebuilt aircraft community about the possibility of modernizing the Mohawk’s plans. Suggestions for updates include integrating lightweight composite materials and alternative engines like four-stroke powerplants or electric propulsion systems. A revival of the Mohawk design, equipped with contemporary technology, could address the growing demand for eco-friendly, efficient, and affordable personal aircraft.

== Specifications (Mohawk) ==
Data from AeroCrafter

General characteristics

- Crew: one
- Capacity: one passenger
- Length: 18 ft 0 in (5.49 m)
- Wingspan: 30 ft 0 in (9.14 m)
- Wing area: 124.5 sq ft (11.57 m^{2})
- Empty weight: 450 lb (204 kg)
- Gross weight: 1,000 lb (454 kg)
- Fuel capacity: 12 U.S. gallons (45 L; 10.0 imp gal)
- Powerplant: 1 × Rotax 503 twin cylinder, air-cooled, two stroke aircraft engine, 50 hp (37 kW)
- Propellers: 2-bladed wooden

Performance

- Maximum speed: 130 mph (210 km/h, 110 kn)
- Cruise speed: 85 mph (137 km/h, 74 kn)
- Stall speed: 30 mph (48 km/h, 26 kn) flaperons down
- Range: 320 mi (510 km, 280 nmi)
- Service ceiling: 12,000 ft (3,700 m)
- Rate of climb: 1,200 ft/min (6.1 m/s)
- Wing loading: 8.0 lb/sq ft (39 kg/m^{2})
