= Sochen Phoenix =

General information
- Type: One/two seat microlight
- National origin: South Africa
- Designer: Edwin Sochen
- Number built: 14 (both variants) by c.1985

The Sochen Phoenix was a single engine, three-axis control microlight designed and produced in small numbers in South Africa in the early 1980s.

== Design and development ==
The original single seat ES-1 Phoenix began as a rebuild by Edwin Sochen of a storm-destroyed Quicksilver MX but emerged a much refined aircraft, with two-surface wings, ailerons rather than spoilers and a fully steerable undercarriage. One of these was built and flown, then Sochen developed it into the CII two-seater.

Seating apart, the two variants were generally similar. The two surface wing, tapered in plan with a straight leading edge and a forward swept trailing edge, was braced from below on each side by a single strut, assisted by jury struts. The ailerons filled the whole span. The fuselage of the Phoenix was a completely open aluminium frame structure which carried the exposed pilot's seat, placing his head just below the leading edge of the wing and supporting the engine in pusher configuration immediately behind. The fuselage frame extended rearwards to carry a conventional tail with horizontal surfaces at the same height as the wing and an all-moving rudder with a swept leading edge, extending below the tailplane aft of the rudder post. The rudder of the CII was swept on both edges, unlike that of the single seat version, and extended downwards further. The tricycle undercarriage had three similarly sized wheels mounted on short legs interconnected by a triangular frame. The front wheel was steerable from the rudder bar and the rear pair were differentially brakeable.

== Operational history ==
The ES-1 was a one-off, but after two prototypes the CCII was put into production by Court Helicopters. Only eleven were completed before production was stopped.

== Variants ==
Phoenix ES-1
Original single seat version.
Phoenix CCII
Two seat version, put into production with eleven built.

== Specifications (CII) ==
Data from Burger and Burr

General characteristics

- Crew: Two
- Wingspan: 32 ft 0 in (9.75 m)
- Empty weight: 315 lb (143 kg)
- Powerplant: 1 × Rotax 503 air-cooled two-stroke with two inline cylinders, 52 hp (39 kW)
- Propellers: 2-bladed, 4 ft 10 in (1.47 m) diameter

Performance

- Maximum speed: 65 mph (105 km/h, 56 kn)
- Cruise speed: 50 mph (80 km/h, 43 kn)
- Stall speed: 28 mph (45 km/h, 24 kn)
- Range: 100 mi (160 km, 87 nmi) at average cruising speed
- Rate of climb: 350 ft/min (1.8 m/s) from sea level
- Take-off distance: 230 ft (70 m)
- Landing distance: 100 ft (30 m)
