= Krasniye Kryl'ya Deltacraft MD-40 =

Russian ultralight trike

Deltacraft MD-40

General information
- Type: Ultralight trike
- National origin: Russia
- Manufacturer: Krasniye Kryl'ya
- Status: In production (2013)

The Krasniye Kryl'ya Deltacraft MD-40 (English: Redwings DeltaCraft) is a Russian ultralight trike, designed and produced by Krasniye Kryl'ya of Taganrog. The aircraft is supplied as a complete ready-to-fly-aircraft.

== Design and development ==
The Deltacraft MD-40 was designed to comply with the Fédération Aéronautique Internationale microlight category, including the category's maximum gross weight of 450 kg (992 lb). The aircraft has a maximum gross weight of 340 kg (750 lb). It features a cable-braced hang glider-style high-wing, weight-shift controls, a single seat open cockpit with a streamlined cockpit fairing, retractable tricycle landing gear and a single engine in pusher configuration.

The aircraft fuselage is made from composites, with its aluminum-framed double surface wing covered in Dacron sailcloth. The wing is supported by a single tube-type kingpost and uses an "A" frame weight-shift control bar. The powerplant is a twin cylinder, air-cooled, two-stroke, dual-ignition 50 hp (37 kW) Rotax 503 engine. The MD-40 has an empty weight of 160 kg (353 lb) and a gross weight of 340 kg (750 lb), giving a useful load of 180 kg (397 lb). With full fuel of 28 litres (6.2 imp gal; 7.4 US gal) the payload is 160 kg (353 lb).

A number of different wings can be fitted to the basic carriage, including a wing with an area of 16.7 m^{2} (180 sq ft) produced by the company.

== Specifications (Deltacraft MD-40) ==
Data from Bayerl

General characteristics

- Crew: one
- Wing area: 16.7 m^{2} (180 sq ft)
- Empty weight: 160 kg (353 lb)
- Gross weight: 340 kg (750 lb)
- Fuel capacity: 28 litres (6.2 imp gal; 7.4 US gal)
- Powerplant: 1 × Rotax 503 twin cylinder, air-cooled, two stroke aircraft engine, 37 kW (50 hp)
- Propellers: 3-bladed composite

Performance

- Maximum speed: 95 km/h (59 mph, 51 kn)
- Cruise speed: 75 km/h (47 mph, 40 kn)
- Rate of climb: 4 m/s (790 ft/min)
- Wing loading: 20.4 kg/m^{2} (4.2 lb/sq ft)
