= Cosmos Echo =

French ultralight trike

Echo

General information
- Type: Ultralight trike
- National origin: France
- Manufacturer: Cosmos ULM
- Status: In production

The Cosmos Echo is a French single-seat, ultralight trike that is produced by Cosmos ULM. The aircraft is only supplied as a completed aircraft and is not available as a kit.

== Design and development ==
The Echo was designed to comply with the European Fédération Aéronautique Internationale microlight classification and has been used in microlight competition flying. It features a cable-braced hang glider-style high-wing, weight-shift controls, a single-seat, open cockpit, tricycle landing gear and a single engine in pusher configuration.

The aircraft wing is made from bolted-together aluminium tubing, with its double surface wing covered in Dacron sailcloth. A number of different wings can be fitted, including the Top 12.9. The wing is supported by a single tube-type kingpost and uses an "A" frame control bar. Optional equipment includes a cockpit fairing and wheel pants. Engines used are the 37 kW (50 hp) Rotax 503 twin cylinder, two-stroke and 30 kW (40 hp) Rotax 447 powerplants

== Variants ==
Echo 12
With the 37 kW (50 hp) Rotax 503 twin cylinder, two-stroke engine and the Top 12.9 wing.
Echo Fun
With the 30 kW (40 hp) Rotax 447 twin cylinder, two-stroke engine.
Echo Racer
With the 37 kW (50 hp) Rotax 503 twin cylinder, two-stroke engine.

== Specifications (Echo Racer) ==
Data from Bertrand and Purdy

General characteristics

- Crew: one
- Wingspan: 9.87 m (32 ft 5 in)
- Wing area: 12.9 m^{2} (139 sq ft)
- Empty weight: 126 kg (278 lb)
- Gross weight: 300 kg (661 lb)
- Fuel capacity: 38 litres (8.4 imp gal; 10 US gal)
- Powerplant: 1 × Rotax 503 twin cylinder, air-cooled two-stroke aircraft engine, 37 kW (50 hp)
- Propellers: 3-bladed Powerfin composite

Performance

- Maximum speed: 155 km/h (96 mph, 84 kn)
- Cruise speed: 110 km/h (68 mph, 59 kn)
- Stall speed: 40 km/h (25 mph, 22 kn)
- Range: 523 km (325 mi, 282 nmi)
- Service ceiling: 5,500 m (18,000 ft)
- Rate of climb: 4.1 m/s (800 ft/min)
