= Krasniye Kryl'ya =

Russian ultralight aircraft manufacturer

- Company type: Privately held company
- Industry: Aerospace
- Headquarters: Taganrog, Russia
- Products: Ultralight trikes, hang gliders
- Website: www.redwings.ru

Krasniye Kryl'ya (Russian: Красные Крылья, English: Red Wings) is a Russian aircraft manufacturer based in Taganrog. The company specializes in the design and manufacture of ultralight trikes and hang gliders.

The company is noted in Russia and eastern Europe as a producer of hang gliders and trikes, having won a world championship competition in the 1990s. Their products have not been exported widely, though.

== Aircraft ==
Summary of aircraft built by Krasniye Kryl'ya
Model name	First flight	Number built	Type
Krasniye Kryl'ya Deltacraft MD-40			Ultralight trike
Krasniye Kryl'ya Deltacraft MD-50C			Ultralight trike
Krasniye Kryl'ya Mandelevium MD-30			Ultralight trike
