= Fly Air Limited =

- Company type: Privately held company
- Industry: Aerospace
- Fate: Out of business (2021)
- Headquarters: Trudovec, Bulgaria
- Key people: Simeon Simeonov
- Products: Ultralight aircraft
- Website: www.paramotor-bg.com

Fly Air Limited is a Bulgarian aircraft manufacturer based in Trudovec, headed by Simeon Simeonov. The company specializes in the design and manufacture of ultralight aircraft, including ultralight trikes, powered parachutes and powered paragliders. The company was originally located in Pravets.

The company's aircraft emphasize simplicity and portability, including ground transport by automobile. Ultralight trikes, such as the Fly Air Trike Moster and the now out-of-production Fly Air Swallow, use simple square steel tube construction. Most designs use the Italian Vittorazi Moster 185 two-stroke powerplant.

The company supplies AirDesign paramotor wings with its paramotors. In April 2017 the company became a dealer for La Mouette hang glider wings.

By 2021 the company website had been taken down and it is likely the company is out of business.

== Aircraft ==
Summary of aircraft built by Fly Air Limited:

- Fly Air Double Seat Trike
- Fly Air Paramotor
- Fly Air Paratrike
- Fly Air Swallow
- Fly Air Trike Moster
