= Cyclone AX2000 =

AX2000
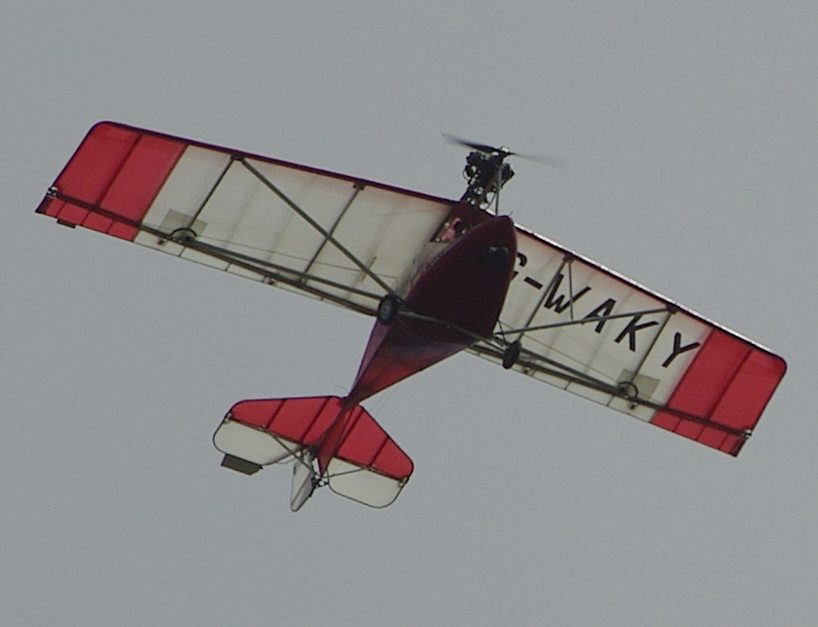
- A HKS 700E powered AX2000

General information
- Type: microlight
- National origin: United Kingdom
- Manufacturer: Cyclone Airsports Ltd
- Number built: at least 29

History
- First flight: c.1997
- Developed from: Cyclone AX3

The Cyclone AX2000 is a British built three axis microlight, first flown in the 1990s. It seats two in side-by-side configuration.

== Design and development ==
The AX2000 is a development of the earlier Cyclone AX3, a UK regulation compliant variant of the French Ultralair Premier AX3. This, in turn, was a three-axis development of the US Chotia Weedhopper from the early 1980s.

The Cyclone AX2000 is an aluminium tube framed three-axis microlight with flying surfaces covered with a polyester fabric with outer PVF lamination (URLAM). The whole aircraft is built around a long, high aluminium keel boom, which bears the engine, wings and empennage. The wing is a two spar structure, with surfaces formed by upper and lower battens rather than ribs. It carries conventional, full span, tapering ailerons but no flaps. The tailplane is mounted on the keel and has an anti-balance/trim tab on the starboard elevator. There is a small fixed fin below the keel but none above; the rudder is balanced and extends below the elevators, moving in a cut-out.

The short, deep fuselage is built around a wire braced tube beam. Lift and landing loads are taken by V-shaped, cross braced pairs of lift struts from the bottom of the fuselage to each wing, assisted by a centre line strut to the boom at the wing leading edge. The cockpit enclosure is non-structural, with forward opening doors to a pair of side-by-side seats. These are equipped with separate rudder pedals but the occupants share a central control column. The AX2000 has a tricycle undercarriage mounted close to the fuselage.

The engine is mounted, uncowled, ahead and above the wing leading edge, with the propeller shaft on the boom line. One of three engines may be fitted: a 48 kW (64 hp) Rotax 582/48 or 38 kW (51 hp) 503 2V, both upright twin cylinder two strokes, or the 45 kW (60 hp) HKS 700E (either V3 or Beta variants), flat twin four stroke. Both Rotax engines drive propellers with ground adjustable pitch: the 582 has a three blade, composite propeller and the 503 a two blade wooden one.

As well the new engines, the AX2000 differs chiefly from the AX3 in having a completely double surface wing of reduced area and modified structure, a change of alloy for the main keel beam, a revised and lightened fuselage with new undercarriage, an increased fuel capacity and the addition of an elevator anti-balance trim tab.

The AX2000 is certificated as a glider tug, for gliders of class 1 and 2. A V-shaped forward tow line extension joins the main line to a pair of tug pillars attached to the rear spar on the under surfaces of the AX2000's wing.

== Operational history ==
In mid-2011 there were 29 AX2000s on the UK civil aircraft register.

== Variants ==
Cyclone AX-3
Production by Cyclone Airsports with either a Rotax 502 or Rotax 582 engine.
Pegasus AX2000
Improved variant produced by Pegasus Aircraft from 1996.

== Specifications ==
Data from Civil Aircraft Authority microlight type approval data sheet (TADS) no.BM53 issue 9

General characteristics

- Crew: 2
- Length: 5.60 m (18 ft 4 in)
- Wingspan: 9.10 m (29 ft 10 in)
- Height: 2.10 m (6 ft 11 in)
- Wing area: 15.77 m^{2} (169.7 sq ft)
- Empty weight: 201 kg (443 lb) notional
- Max takeoff weight: 450 kg (992 lb)
- Fuel capacity: 62 L

Performance

- Maximum speed: 100 km/h (62 mph, 54 kn) manoeuvring
- Stall speed: 58 km/h (36 mph, 31 kn)
- Never exceed speed: 140 km/h (90 mph, 78 kn)
