= Aces High Light Aircraft =

Canadian ultralight aircraft manufacturer

- Type: Private company
- Industry: Aerospace
- Fate: Bankrupt
- Headquarters: London, Ontario
- Key people: CEO: Cor Wester
- Products: Kit aircraft

Aces High Light Aircraft was a Canadian ultralight manufacturer, located in London, Ontario.

Well known for its Cuby line of light and ultralight aircraft, the firm ceased operations in the mid-1990s.

== Aircraft ==
Summary of aircraft built by Aces High Light Aircraft
| Model name | First flight | Number built | Type |
|---|---|---|---|
| Cuby I | | | Single seat ultralight aircraft |
| Cuby II | | | Two seat light aircraft |
