= Teman Mono-Fly =

American ultralight aircraft

Mono-Fly

General information
- Type: Ultralight aircraft
- National origin: United States
- Manufacturer: Teman Aircraft Inc
- Designer: Bob Teman
- Status: Production completed

The Teman Mono-Fly is an American ultralight aircraft that was designed by structural engineer Bob Teman and produced by Teman Aircraft Inc. The aircraft was supplied as a kit for amateur construction and later as a factory-completed aircraft.

== Design and development ==
The Mono-Fly was designed to comply with the US FAR 103 Ultralight Vehicles rules, including the category's maximum empty weight of 254 lb (115 kg). The aircraft has a standard empty weight of 250 lb (113 kg). It features a strut-braced high-wing, a single-seat, open cockpit, tricycle landing gear and a single engine in pusher configuration.

The aircraft is made from aluminum tubing that is pop riveted together using gussets. On early examples the flying surfaces were covered in dope and aircraft fabric covering, but this was later changed to heat-shrunk Dacron sailcloth, to save weight. Its 30.8 ft (9.4 m) span wing employs a modified Clark Y airfoil. The wings are supported by a single lift strut and a jury strut. The pilot is accommodated on an open seat, without a windshield. The controls are conventional three-axis, but the aircraft uses a control yoke rather than the more common control stick. The landing gear features main wheel bungee suspension.

Early kit-built examples came out with empty weights too high for the FAR Part 103 limit, so the factory stopped supplying kits and produced completed aircraft instead. These factory-built examples have empty weights under 254 lb (115 kg), even when equipped with a Rotax 503 engine of 50 hp (37 kW). An Onan 18 hp (13 kW) four stroke industrial engine was also used, although this limited the rate of climb to 400 ft/min (2.0 m/s).

Reviewer Andre Cliche described the Mono-Fly as "well engineered". It is stressed to +10/-10g.

== Specifications (version) ==
Data from Cliche and the Virtual Ultralight Museum

General characteristics

- Crew: one
- Length: 17.2 ft (5.2 m)
- Wingspan: 30.8 ft (9.4 m)
- Height: 6.6 ft (2.0 m)
- Wing area: 124 sq ft (11.5 m^{2})
- Airfoil: modified Clark Y
- Empty weight: 250 lb (113 kg)
- Gross weight: 550 lb (249 kg)
- Fuel capacity: 5 U.S. gallons (19 L; 4.2 imp gal)
- Powerplant: 1 × Rotax 503 twin cylinder, two-stroke aircraft engine, 50 hp (37 kW)

Performance

- Maximum speed: 63 mph (101 km/h, 55 kn)
- Cruise speed: 45 mph (72 km/h, 39 kn)
- Stall speed: 20 mph (32 km/h, 17 kn)
- g limits: +10/-10
- Rate of climb: 1,000 ft/min (5.1 m/s)
- Wing loading: 4.43 lb/sq ft (21.6 kg/m^{2})
