= Australian Ultralight Industries Bunyip =

Bunyip

General information
- Type: Ultralight
- Manufacturer: Australian Ultralight Industries

The Australian Ultralight Industries Bunyip was an ultralight aircraft produced in South Australia. According to the Recreational Aviation Australia aircraft register, there are currently only two Bunyip aircraft registered in Australia as of 2007.

== Specifications ==
General characteristics

- Crew: One pilot
- Wingspan: 9.1 m (30 ft)
- Powerplant: 1 × Rotax 503 , 37 kW (53 hp)

Performance
