= ViS Sprint =

Sprint

General information
- Type: Two-seat ultralight
- National origin: Ukraine
- Manufacturer: ViS
- Designer: Vyacheslav Shkurenko
- Number built: 5 by mid-2010

History
- First flight: 2004

The ViS Sprint is a pusher configuration, pod-and-boom two-seat ultralight, designed and built in Ukraine in the mid-2000s. It can serve as an agricultural spraying aircraft.

== Design and development ==
The Sprint is a high-wing monoplane with a constant-chord, straight-edged single-spar wing built, like most of the aircraft, from duralumin and braced with a single forward-leaning, streamlined strut on each side to the lower fuselage. Flaps are fitted. The fuselage is of the pod-and-boom type. The pod is narrow, seating two in tandem under a three-piece transparency that extends, smoothly contoured, from just aft of the wing leading edge almost to the extreme nose. The Sprint's fixed tricycle undercarriage is mounted on the fuselage, with spring cantilever main legs attached to the lower fuselage just below the wing bracing strut attachment points and a castoring nosewheel on a short extension placing it just in front of the nose. Its pusher configuration 73.5 kW (98.6 hp) Rotax 912 ULS water-cooled flat four engine is mounted on the upper rear of the pod at wing height, driving a three blade propeller just behind the trailing edge. The T tail unit is carried on the narrow rectangular section boom, an extension of the lower pod structure. Its fin is broad, swept and straight-edged, with a rear sloping hinge for the nearly rectangular rudder; the tailplane is braced from below to the boom.

The prototype VS-3 Sprint first flew in 2004 powered by a 34 kW (46 hp) Rotax 503 to cylinder horizontally opposed two stroke engine. Later it was tested with a 63.4 kW (85.0 hp) Suzuki engine but the Rotax 912 was finally adopted.

== Variants ==
Sprint
Standard sport version
Sprint SKh
Agricultural spraying version. Carries 130 L (28.6 Imp gal; 34.3 US gal) of sprayant in two streamlined tanks attached to the lower fuselage just ahead of the wing bracing strut and main undercarriage leg. Liquid chemical is applied via underwing spraybars from the lower fuselage and supported below the wing on each side by a V-strut.

== Specifications (Sprint) ==
Data from Jane's All the World's Aircraft 2013-14 p.657

General characteristics

- Capacity: Two
- Length: 6.14 m (20 ft 2 in)
- Wingspan: 9.60 m (31 ft 6 in)
- Wing area: 12.40 m^{2} (133.5 sq ft)
- Airfoil: D2 14%
- Empty weight: 301 kg (664 lb)
- Max takeoff weight: 550 kg (1,213 lb)
- Fuel capacity: 116 L (25.5 Imp gal; 30.6 US gal) (84 kg (185 lb))
- Powerplant: 1 × Rotax 912 ULS water-cooled flat four, 73.5 kW (98.6 hp)
- Propellers: 3-bladed pusher, ground adjustable pitch, composites

Performance

- Maximum speed: 170 km/h (110 mph, 92 kn)
- Cruise speed: 130 km/h (81 mph, 70 kn)
- Stall speed: 60 km/h (37 mph, 32 kn)
- Never exceed speed: 200 km/h (120 mph, 110 kn)
