= Alpaero Choucas =

Choucas
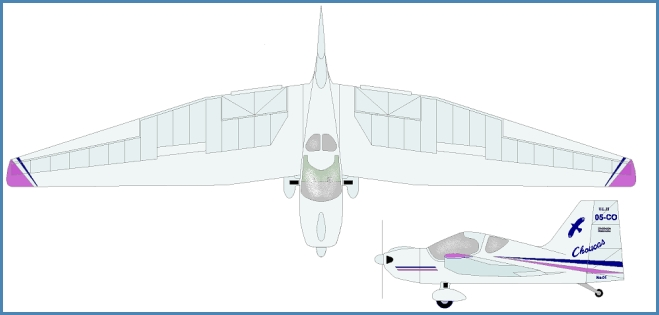

General information
- Type: Motor glider
- National origin: France
- Manufacturer: ALPAERO Noin Aéronautique, Châteauvieux
- Designer: Claude Noin
- Number built: 12 flying, others building

History
- First flight: February 1996

The Alpaero Choucas (English: Jackdaw) is a French two seat, single engine tailless kit-built ultralight motor glider. At least 12 are flying, with more under construction.

== Design and development ==
The Choucas is the fourth design by Claude Noin and is sometimes referred to as the Noin Choucas. It is an ultralight, initially produced in kit form for home assembly, though since 2005 flight-ready aircraft have been an option.

It is a single-engine tailless aircraft of similar layout to the Fauvel AV.22: short, with fin and rudder but no horizontal stabiliser and a mid-mounted wing with mild forward sweep at mid-chord, carrying 4° of dihedral. The aerofoil has reflex camber and a thickness/chord ratio of 17%. The wing leading edge is straight and unswept, and the centre section has almost constant chord, but outboard the trailing edge has marked forward sweep. The main spar is carbon fibre, supporting glass fibre-reinforced styrofoam ribs with a plywood-covered D-section box at the leading edge. The rest of the wing is Dacron-covered. An option extends the span by 0.65 m to 15 m and includes winglets. Outboard ailerons provide lateral control and centre section moulded carbon fibre elevators, assisted by trim tabs, control pitch. Spoilers, at about mid-chord on the wing upper surface and just outboard of the centre section, also act as airbrakes.

The standard fuselage is formed from two carbon fibre half shells, though glass fibre may be used as a heavier alternative. Seating is side by side under a one-piece, upward-hinging canopy. The rudder is large but not balanced or tabbed. The Choucas has a tailwheel undercarriage with outward-curving faired main legs cantilevered from the lower fuselage, carrying spatted wheels.

The Choucas is powered by a 37 kW (50 hp) Rotax 503 or Hirth two-stroke powerplant or a 60 hp (45 kW) HKS 700E four-stroke piston engine, driving a two-bladed carbon fibre propeller. A folding propeller, with parked blades parallel and pointing forwards, is available for better unpowered gliding. The second prototype, which incorporates this feature, also has detachable winglets and a rudder, deepened to below the lower fuselage line, which incorporates the tail wheel.

== Operational history ==
The Choucas first flew in February 1996, followed by a second aircraft in 2004. By 2007 two further Choucas were being built. In 2011 twelve powered by the HKS 700E were reported flying.

== Specifications ==
Data from Jane's All the World's Aircraft 2010/11 p.193

General characteristics

- Capacity: 2
- Length: 5.35 m (17 ft 7 in)
- Wingspan: 14.35 m (47 ft 1 in) As an option, 15.00 m wings may be fitted
- Height: 1.95 m (6 ft 5 in)
- Wing area: 21.30 m^{2} (229.3 sq ft)
- Empty weight: 260 kg (573 lb) minimum
- Gross weight: 450 kg (992 lb) under FAI ultralight certification; 510 kg as glider
- Powerplant: 1 × Rotax 503 UL-2V 2 cylinder two stroke with 2.58:1 reduction gear, 37 kW (50 hp)
- Propellers: 2-bladed UC 2o carbon fibre. Option fits forward folding propeller, with parallel blades for gliding, 1.60 m (5 ft 3 in) diameter

Performance

- Maximum speed: 180 km/h (110 mph, 97 kn)
- Cruise speed: 130 km/h (81 mph, 70 kn) at 75% power
- Rate of climb: 1.7 m/s (330 ft/min) at sea level
- Rate of sink: 1.00 m/s (197 ft/min) maximum
- Lift-to-drag: 23
