= Rotax 503 =

Aircraft engine

503
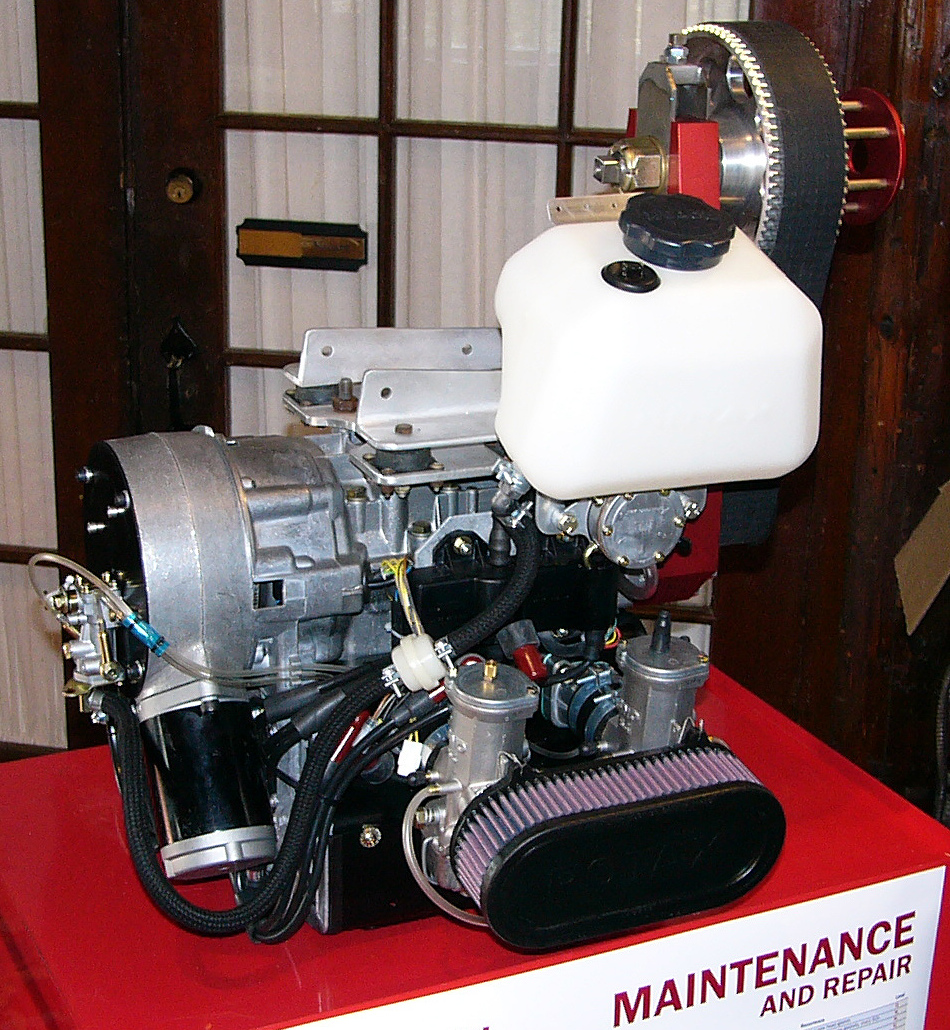
- Rotax 503 trade show display
- Type: Piston aero-engine
- National origin: Austria
- Manufacturer: Rotax
- Major applications: Quad City Challenger; Blue Yonder EZ Flyer
- Manufactured: until 2011

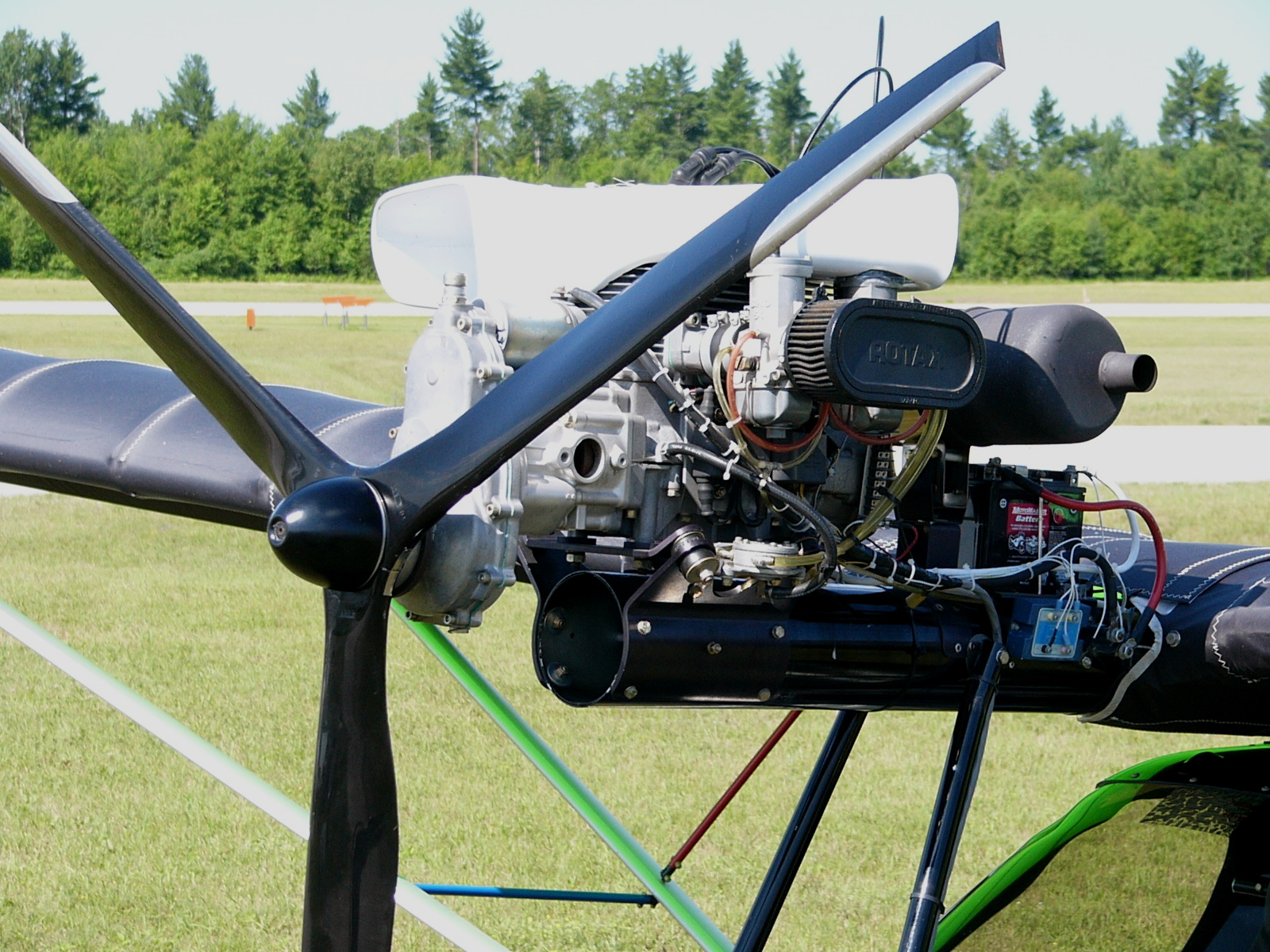
A Rotax 503 mounted on a Flightstar II ultralight

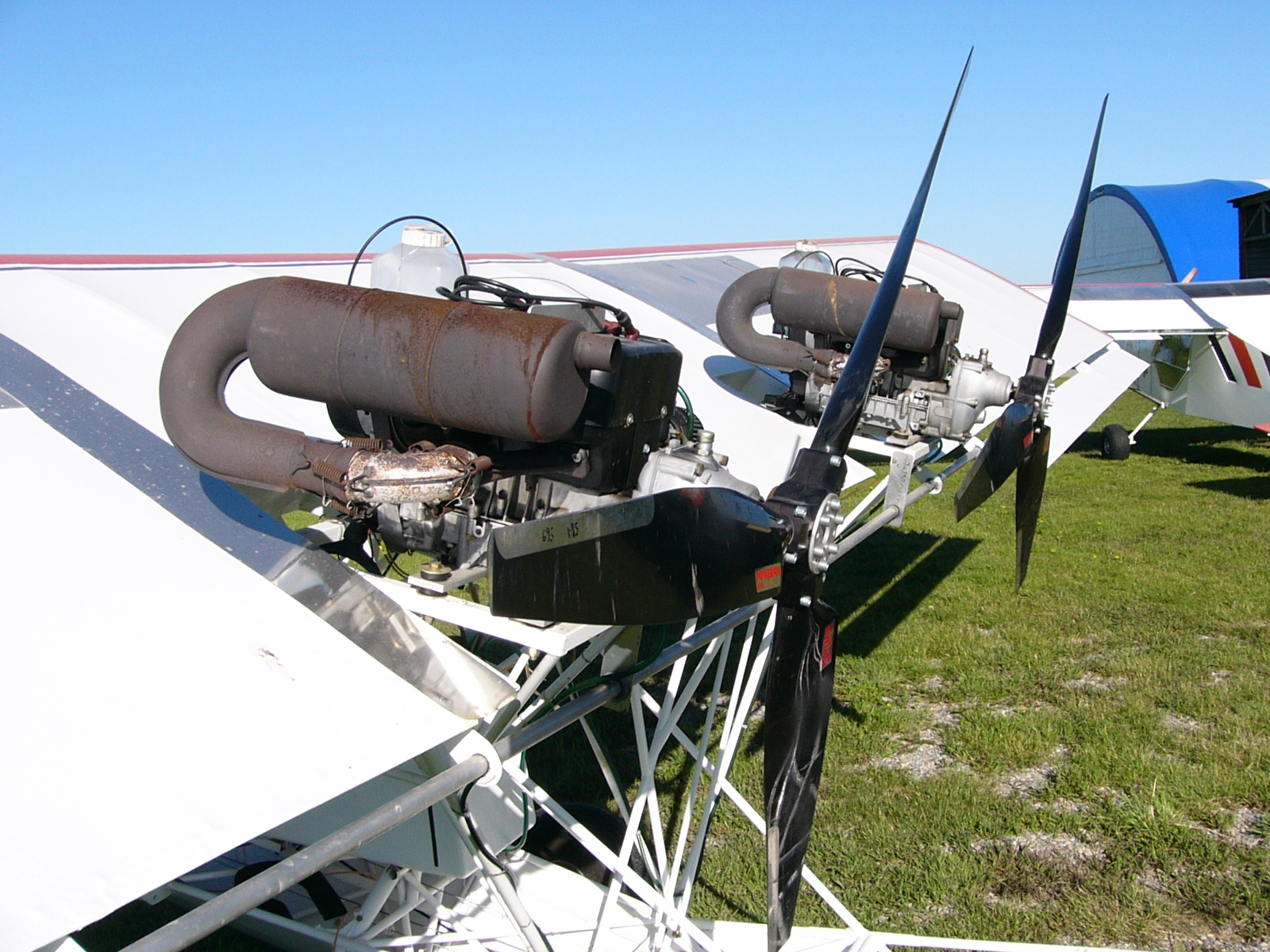
The prototype Blue Yonder Twin Engine EZ Flyer is powered by two 503s in pusher configuration

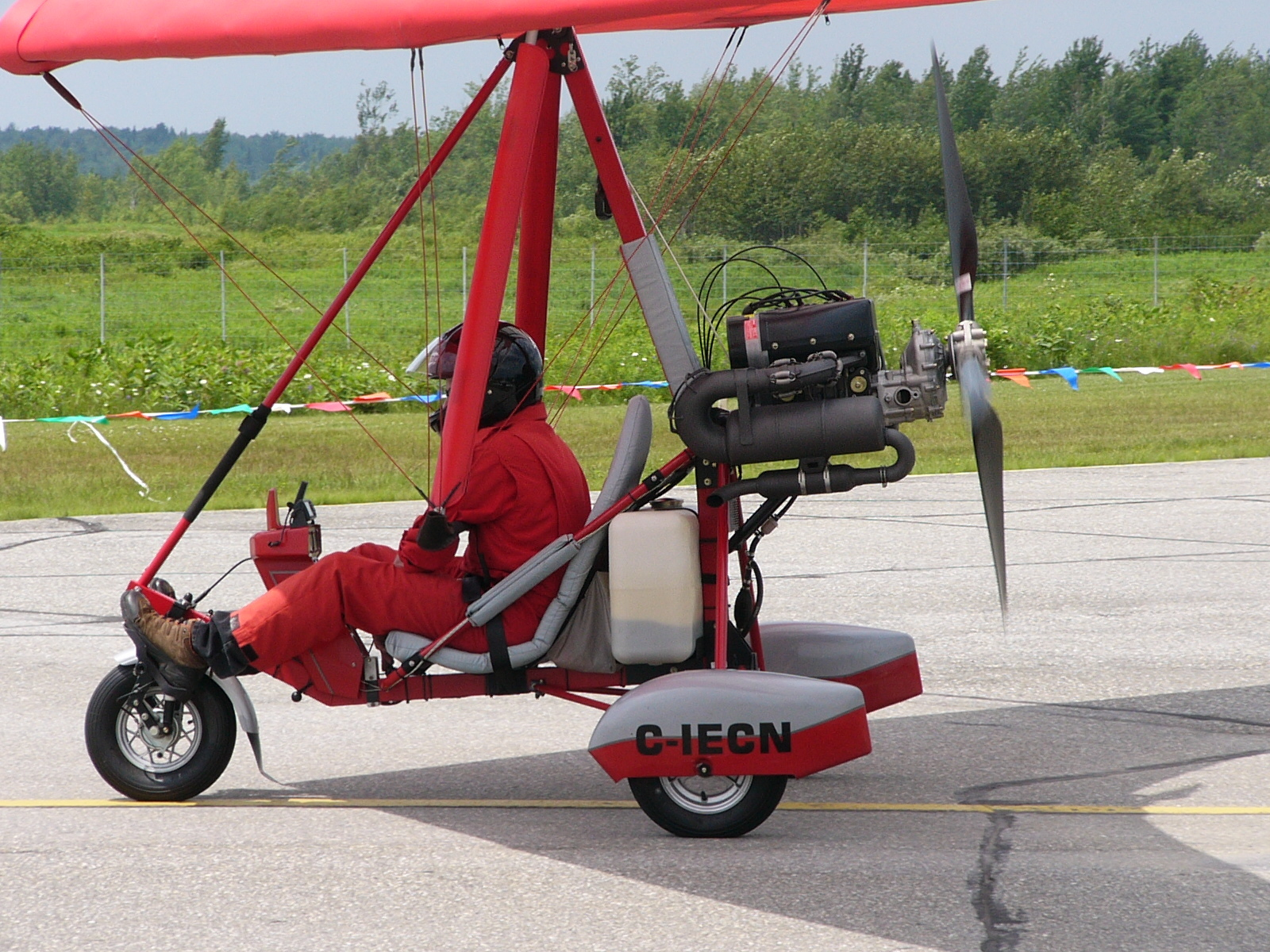
Air Creation Racer ultralight trike with Rotax 503 mounted up-right. Below the muffler is the smaller after-muffler.

The is a 37 kW (50 hp), inline 2-cylinder, two-stroke aircraft engine, built by BRP-Rotax GmbH & Co. KG of Austria for use in ultralight aircraft.

For many years this engine was a popular ultralight aircraft engines in its class (two-stroke, under 60 horsepower), and currently still in use.

As of 2011 the Rotax 503 is no longer in production. However, a Russian manufacturer has developed an approximate reproduction, the RMZ 500. Rotax subsequently offered only one other two-stroke engine for aircraft, the partially water-cooled Rotax 582.

== Design and development ==
The Rotax 503 is piston ported with air-cooled cylinders and heads, utilizing either an engine driven fan and cowl, or free air cooling. Lubrication is either by use of pre-mixed fuel and oil or oil injection from an externally mounted oil tank. The 503 has dual independent breakerless, magneto capacitor-discharge ignition (CDI) systems. It can be equipped with either one or two piston-type carburetors. It uses a manifold-driven pneumatic fuel pump to provide fuel pressure. An optional High Altitude Compensation kit is available.

The engine's propeller drive is via a Rotax type B, C, or E style gearbox. The standard engine includes a muffler exhaust system with an extra after-muffler as optional. The standard starter is a recoil start type, with an electric starter optional. An integral alternating current generator producing 170 watts at 12 volts with external rectifier-regulator is optional. The engine includes an intake air filter and can be fitted with an intake silencer system.

=== Limitations ===
Rotax recommends teardown and inspection every 150 hours, and overhaul every 300 hours.

The manufacturer acknowledges the design limitations of this engine, warning pilots:

"This engine, by its design, is subject to sudden stoppage. Engine stoppage can result in crash landings, forced landings or no power landings. Such crash landings can lead to serious bodily injury or death...This is not a certificated aircraft engine. It has not received any safety or durability testing, and conforms to no aircraft standards. It is for use in experimental, uncertificated aircraft and vehicles only in which an engine failure will not compromise safety. User assumes all risk of use, and acknowledges by his use that he knows this engine is subject to sudden stoppage...Never fly the aircraft equipped with this engine at locations, airspeeds, altitudes, or other circumstances from which a successful no-power landing cannot be made, after sudden engine stoppage. Aircraft equipped with this engine must only fly in DAYLIGHT VFR conditions."

== Applications ==
- 21st Century Airships SPAS 13
- Adams-Wilson Hobbycopter
- A-B Helicopters A/W 95
- Aces High Cuby II
- Acrolite
- Advanced Aeromarine Buccaneer SX
- Aero Adventure Aventura HP
- AeroLites Bearcat
- Aeroprakt A-20
- Aeros-2
- Aeros Cross Country
- Aero-Works Aerolite 103
- Airbet Girabet
- Airborne Edge
- Air Creation GT
- Air Creation Racer
- Air Creation Twin
- Airdrome Dream Fantasy Twin
- Airdrome Fokker D-VI
- Airdrome Fokker D-VIII
- Airfer Transan
- Airframes Unlimited SS-2 Trainer
- Air Sylphe 447
- Alliant Destiny Fusion
- Alliant Destiny XLT
- Alpaero Choucas
- AmeriPlanes Mitchell Wing T-10
- Anglin J6 Karatoo
- Antonov T-2M Maverick
- Antares A-10R503 SOLO
- Antares MA-32
- Apex Eco 6
- Aquilair Kid
- Australian Autogyro Skyhook
- Australian Ultralight Industries Bunyip
- Aviasud Mistral
- Avid Champion
- Avid Flyer
- Aviomania Genesis Duo G2SA
- BAaer Guri
- Bagalini Baganfibio
- Baker Supercat
- BB Microlight BB-two seater
- Birdman Chinook 2S
- Best Off Skyranger
- Blue Yonder EZ Flyer
- Blue Yonder EZ Harvard
- Blue Yonder EZ King Cobra
- Blue Yonder Merlin
- Blue Yonder Twin Engine EZ Flyer
- Buckeye Eclipse
- Calumet Snobird Explorer
- Capella Javelin II
- Capella SS
- Carlson Sparrow
- Circa Reproductions Morane Saulnier N
- Circa Reproductions Nieuport
- CFM Shadow
- CGS Hawk
- Chadwick C-122 helicopter
- Club ULM Rotor Ptenets-2
- Cosmos Bison
- Cosmos Echo
- Cosmos Phase II
- Cyclone AX2000
- Danieli Piuma
- DAR-23
- DTA Evolution
- Earthstar Thunder Gull
- Emerald Coast XL2 Sport
- Eurofly Fire Cat
- Eurofly Fire Fox
- Eurofly Fox
- Eurofly Viper
- Excalibur Aircraft Excalibur
- Facetmobile
- Fisher Avenger
- Fisher Super Koala
- Fisher FP-404 EXP
- Fisher FP-505 Skeeter
- Fisher FP-606 Sky Baby
- Fisher Youngster
- Fletcher Hercules
- Flightstar II
- Fly Air Swallow
- Flying K Sky Raider
- Flylab Tucano
- Fly Synthesis Wallaby
- Freebird II
- Freedom Lite SS-11 Skywatch
- GibboGear Butterfly
- Gidroplan Che-22 Korvet
- Golden Circle Air T-Bird
- Krasniye Kryl'ya Mandelevium MD-30
- Krasniye Kryl'ya Deltacraft MD-40
- Harmening High Flyer
- Harper Lil Breezy
- Heldeberg Convertible
- Heldeberg Marathon
- Heldeberg Spirit 103
- Howland H-3 Pegasus
- Huntwing
- Hy-Tek Clipwing
- Hy-Tek Hurricane Hauler
- InterPlane Skyboy
- ISON Airbike
- J & J Ultralights Seawing
- JDT Eros
- Joplin Tundra
- Kolb Firestar
- Kolb Mark III
- Kolb Slingshot
- Kubicek AV-1
- Las Brisas Mohawk
- Let-Mont Piper UL
- Let-Mont Tulak
- Letov ST-4 Aztek
- Light Miniature Aircraft LM-1
- Lockwood Drifter XP503
- Loehle Sport Parasol
- Mainair Rapier
- Mariner Aircraft Mariner
- Micro Aviation Bantam
- Microleve ML 450
- Midwest Hornet
- Mountaineer Trikes Solo 175
- M-Squared Breese
- Murphy Maverick
- Murphy Renegade
- North American Rotorwerks Pitbull Ultralight
- North Wing Apache
- Pagotto Brako
- Paraplane PSE-2 Osprey
- Paratrek Angel 2-B
- Parascender I
- Parascender II
- Pegasus Quantum
- Phantom X1
- Phoenix Skyblazer
- Pipistrel Taurus
- Pipistrel Spider
- Precision Tech Fergy
- Pterodactyl Ascender
- Polaris Skin
- Quad City Challenger II
- Quicksilver GT400
- Quicksilver MX-2 Sprint
- RagWing RW26 Special II
- RagWing RW7 Duster
- RagWing RW8 PT2S
- RagWing RW11 Rag-A-Bond
- RagWing RW22 Tiger Moth
- Raj Hamsa Clipper
- Raj Hamsa Voyager
- Raj Hamsa X-Air
- Rainbow Aerotrike
- Rans S-4 Coyote
- Rans S-6 Coyote II
- Rans S-7 Courier
- Rans S-9 Chaos
- Rans S-12 Airaile
- Rans S-17 Stinger
- Rocky Mountain Wings Ridge Runner
- Rolandas Kalinauskas RK-7 Orange
- Rotor Flight Dynamics Dominator
- Rotorwing-Aero 3D-RV
- Skystar Kitfox XL
- Sabre 340
- Sabre Wildcat
- St Andrews Viking
- Sapphire Aircraft Australia Sapphire LSA
- Sea-Bow International Sea-Bow
- Six Chuter Skye Ryder Aerochute
- Six Chuter SR1
- Skymaster Single Seater
- Sky Seeker Powerchutes Sky Seeker
- SlipStream Genesis
- Sochen Phoenix
- Solo Wings Aquilla
- Solo Wings Windlass
- Sorrell Hiperlight
- Spartan DFD Aerotome
- Skywatch SS11
- Spectrum Beaver
- Sport Copter Lightning
- Sport Flight Talon
- Star-Lite Warp 1-A
- Stellar Astra
- Summit 2
- Summit 103 Mini Breeze
- Summit Steel Breeze
- Sundog One-Seater
- Synairgie Jet Ranger
- TC's Trikes Coyote
- Teman Mono-Fly
- Tennessee Propellers Scout
- TeST TST-3 Alpin T
- TeST TST-14 M Bonus
- Titan Tornado
- TL Ultralight TL-32 Typhoon
- Ultracraft Calypso
- Viking Aircraft Viking II
- ViS Sprint
- Vortech A/W 95
- Vortech G-1
- Vortech Sparrow
- World Seair Corp Seair

== Specifications (503) ==
Data from OPERATORS MANUAL FOR ENGINE TYPES 447, 503 & 582

=== General characteristics ===
- Type: two-stroke air-cooled aeroengine
- Bore: 72 mm (2.84 in)
- Stroke: 61 mm (2.4 in)
- Displacement: 503cc 30.69 (cu in)
- Dry weight: 31.4 kg (69 lb) (dry, no exhaust system)

=== Components ===
- Valvetrain: piston ports
- Fuel system: pneumatic pump pressurized
- Fuel type: regular autofuel
- Oil system: premixed in the fuel at 50:1 or oil injection
- Cooling system: fan or free air
- Reduction gear: Rotax 'B' gearbox: 2.00, 2.24 or 2.58 ratios; Rotax 'C' or 'D' gearbox: 2.62, 3.00, 3.47 or 4.00 ratios

=== Performance ===
- Power output: 37 kW (50 hp) at 6800 rpm
- Compression ratio: 10.8 (theoretical)
- Fuel consumption: 15 L/hr (4 US gph)
- Power-to-weight ratio: 1.18 kW/kg (0.72 hp/lb)
