= Kubicek AV-1 =

AV-1

General information
- Type: Hot-air airship
- National origin: Czech Republic
- Manufacturer: Kubicek Balloons
- Number built: 1

History
- First flight: 16 October 1993

The Kubicek AV-1 is a hot-air airship designed and built in the Czech Republic by Kubicek Limited. The AV-1 was built as an advertising airship for the TICO group of Prague and first flew on the 16 October 1993.

== Specification ==
Data from Brassey's World Aircraft & Systems Directory 1996 and Hotairships.com

General characteristics

- Crew: 1 pilot
- Capacity: 1 passenger
- Length: 35.00 m (114 ft 10 in)
- Height: 12.00 m (39 ft 4 in) envelope height
- Volume: 2,800 m^{3} (99,000 cu ft)
- Powerplant: 1 × Rotax 503 piston engine, 37 kW (50 hp)
- Propellers: single blade Justas-Stratos 4-blade pusher

Performance

- Maximum speed: 25 km/h (16 mph, 13 kn)
- Endurance: 1.5
