= Star-Lite Warp 1-A =

American homebuilt airplane

Warp 1-A

General information
- Type: Homebuilt aircraft
- National origin: United States
- Manufacturer: Star-Lite Engineering
- Status: Production completed
- Number built: At least one

History
- Introduction date: 1996

The Star-Lite Warp 1-A is an American homebuilt aircraft that was designed and produced by Star-Lite Engineering of Englewood, Ohio, introduced in 1996. When it was available the aircraft was supplied as a kit for amateur construction.

== Design and development ==
The aircraft was designed to comply with the US FAR 103 Ultralight Vehicles rules, including the category's maximum empty weight of 254 lb (115 kg). The aircraft has a standard empty weight of 250 lb (113 kg).

The Warp 1-A features a cantilever mid-wing, a single-seat enclosed cockpit under a bubble canopy, fixed tricycle landing gear with wheel pants, a boom-mounted T-tail and a single pod-mounted engine in pusher configuration.

The aircraft is made from composites. Its 25.0 ft (7.6 m) span wing is made with an aluminum spar and S-glass vinyl-ester resin, is detachable for ground transport or storage and has a wing area of 87.5 sq ft (8.13 m^{2}). The standard engine used is the 50 hp (37 kW) Rotax 503 two-stroke powerplant.

The Warp 1-A has a typical empty weight of 250 lb (110 kg) and a gross weight of 575 lb (261 kg), giving a useful load of 325 lb (147 kg). With full fuel of 5 U.S. gallons (19 L; 4.2 imp gal) the payload for the pilot and baggage is 295 lb (134 kg).

The standard day, sea level, no wind, take off and landing roll with a 50 hp (37 kW) engine is 150 ft (46 m).

The manufacturer estimates the construction time from the supplied kit as 100 hours.

== Operational history ==
In March 2014 one example, the prototype, was registered in the United States with the Federal Aviation Administration as an Experimental - Amateur-built, although its registration expired in June 2013.

== Specifications (Warp 1-A) ==
Data from AeroCrafter and the manufacturer

General characteristics

- Crew: one
- Wingspan: 25 ft 0 in (7.62 m)
- Wing area: 87.50 sq ft (8.129 m^{2})
- Aspect ratio: 7:1
- Empty weight: 250 lb (113 kg)
- Gross weight: 575 lb (261 kg)
- Fuel capacity: 5 U.S. gallons (19 L; 4.2 imp gal)
- Powerplant: 1 × Rotax twin cylinder, air-cooled, two stroke aircraft engine, 50 hp (37 kW)
- Propellers: 2-bladed fixed pitch

Performance

- Cruise speed: 95 mph (153 km/h, 83 kn)
- Stall speed: 40 mph (64 km/h, 35 kn)
- Never exceed speed: 110 mph (180 km/h, 96 kn)
- Service ceiling: 12,000 ft (3,700 m)
- Rate of climb: 900 ft/min (4.6 m/s)
- Wing loading: 6.6 lb/sq ft (32 kg/m^{2})
