= Krasniye Kryl'ya Deltacraft MD-50C =

Russian ultralight trike

Deltacraft MD-50C

General information
- Type: Ultralight trike
- National origin: Russia
- Manufacturer: Krasniye Kryl'ya
- Status: In production (2013)

The Krasniye Kryl'ya Deltacraft MD-50C (English: Redwings DeltaCraft) is a Russian ultralight trike, designed and produced by Krasniye Kryl'ya of Taganrog. The aircraft is supplied as a complete ready-to-fly-aircraft.

== Design and development ==
The Deltacraft MD-50C was designed to comply with the Fédération Aéronautique Internationale microlight category, including the category's maximum gross weight of 450 kg (992 lb). The aircraft has a maximum gross weight of 380 kg (838 lb). It features a cable-braced hang glider-style high-wing, weight-shift controls, a two-seats-in-tandem open cockpit with a cockpit fairing, tricycle landing gear with wheel pants and a single engine in pusher configuration.

The aircraft is made from bolted-together aluminum tubing, with its double surface wing covered in Dacron sailcloth. The wing is supported by a single tube-type kingpost and uses an "A" frame weight-shift control bar. The powerplant is a twin cylinder, air-cooled, two-stroke, dual-ignition 50 hp (37 kW) Rotax 503 engine or liquid-cooled 64 hp (48 kW) Rotax 582. With the 582 engine the aircraft has an empty weight of 178 kg (392 lb) and a gross weight of 380 kg (838 lb), giving a useful load of 202 kg (445 lb). With full fuel of 80 litres (18 imp gal; 21 US gal) the payload is 144 kg (317 lb).

A number of different wings can be fitted to the basic carriage, including a 14 m^{2} (150 sq ft) wing produced by the company.

== Variants ==
Deltacraft MD-50C
Version with 64 hp (48 kW) Rotax 582 engine
Mandelevium MD-30
Version with 50 hp (37 kW) Rotax 503 engine

== Specifications (Deltacraft MD-50C) ==
Data from Bayerl

General characteristics

- Crew: one
- Capacity: one passenger
- Wing area: 14 m^{2} (150 sq ft)
- Empty weight: 178 kg (392 lb)
- Gross weight: 380 kg (838 lb)
- Fuel capacity: 80 litres (18 imp gal; 21 US gal)
- Powerplant: 1 × Rotax 582 twin cylinder, liquid-cooled, two stroke aircraft engine, 48 kW (64 hp)
- Propellers: 3-bladed composite

Performance

- Maximum speed: 125 km/h (78 mph, 67 kn)
- Cruise speed: 85 km/h (53 mph, 46 kn)
- Rate of climb: 4 m/s (790 ft/min)
- Wing loading: 27.1 kg/m^{2} (5.6 lb/sq ft)
