= Bagalini Baganfibio =

Italian homebuilt flying boat

Baganfibio

General information
- Type: Homebuilt aircraft
- National origin: Italy
- Designer: Marino Bagalini
- Status: Plans available (1998)

The Bagalini Baganfibio (a portmanteau of "Bagalini" and "Amphibian") is an Italian homebuilt flying boat that was designed by Marino Bagalini. The aircraft is supplied in the form of plans for amateur construction.

== Design and development ==
The Baganfibio features a strut-braced high-wing, a two-seats-in-tandem enclosed cockpit, retractable conventional landing gear and a single engine in tractor configuration mounted above the wing.

The aircraft is of all-wooden construction, with its wings covered in doped aircraft fabric. Its 10.7 m (35.1 ft) span wing employs an RSG 36 airfoil, mounts Junkers ailerons and has a wing area of 15.515 m^{2} (167.00 sq ft). The aircraft does not use tip floats, but instead relies on sponsons for balance in the water. The acceptable power range is 40 to 50 hp (30 to 37 kW) and the standard engines used are the 40 hp (30 kW) Rotax 447 or the 50 hp (37 kW) Rotax 503 two-stroke powerplants.

The Baganfibio has an empty weight of 175 kg (386 lb) and a gross weight of 344 kg (758 lb), giving a useful load of 170 kg (370 lb). With full fuel of 26 litres (5.7 imp gal; 6.9 US gal) the payload is 151 kg (333 lb).

The manufacturer estimates the construction time from the supplied kit as 700 hours.

== Specifications (Baganfibio) ==
Data from AeroCrafter and The Incomplete Guide to Airfoil Usage

General characteristics

- Crew: one
- Capacity: one passenger
- Length: 6.71 m (22 ft 0 in)
- Wingspan: 10.67 m (35 ft 0 in)
- Wing area: 15.5 m^{2} (167 sq ft)
- Airfoil: RSG 36
- Empty weight: 175 kg (385 lb)
- Gross weight: 344 kg (759 lb)
- Fuel capacity: 26 litres (5.7 imp gal; 6.9 US gal)
- Powerplant: 1 × Rotax 503 twin cylinder, air-cooled, two stroke aircraft engine, 37 kW (50 hp)

Performance

- Maximum speed: 100 km/h (62 mph, 54 kn)
- Cruise speed: 69 km/h (43 mph, 37 kn)
- Stall speed: 45 km/h (28 mph, 24 kn)
- Range: 210 km (130 mi, 110 nmi)
- Rate of climb: 3.0 m/s (600 ft/min)
- Wing loading: 22 kg/m^{2} (4.5 lb/sq ft)
