= Cosmos Samba =

French ultralight trike

Samba

General information
- Type: Ultralight trike
- National origin: France
- Manufacturer: Cosmos ULM
- Status: In production

The Cosmos Samba, named after the dance of the same name, is a French ultralight trike that is produced by Cosmos ULM of Fontaine-lès-Dijon, France. The aircraft is supplied as a complete aircraft and is not available as a kit.

== Design and development ==
The Samba is a minimalist aircraft, sometimes referred to as a nanolight-trike. It was designed to comply with the US FAR 103 Ultralight Vehicles rules, including the category's maximum empty weight of 254 lb (115 kg). The aircraft has a standard empty weight of 210 lb (95 kg). It features a cable-braced hang glider-style high-wing, weight-shift controls, a single-seat, open cockpit, tricycle landing gear and a single engine in pusher configuration.

The aircraft is made from bolted-together aluminum tubing. The Tedlar-covered single surface wing is a French La Mouette Topless M design that uses an internal Kevlar cross-bar reinforcement in place of a kingpost and ground wires. The lower flying wires are retained, however, giving the aircraft a load rating of +6/-3g. Control is weight-shift via an "A" frame control bar.

The lack of the kingpost and associated cables allows the Samba a top speed of 93 km/h (58 mph) on only 16 kW (21 hp) of power provided by a Zenoah G-25 single cylinder, two stroke powerplant. Because of its low drag the aircraft is suitable for power-off soaring flight and the engine can be restarted in flight.

The Samba can be disassembled for storage or car-top transport in 20 minutes.

== Specifications (Samba) ==
Data from Cliche, Bertrand and Purdy

General characteristics

- Crew: one
- Length: 1.8 m (6 ft)
- Wingspan: 10.12 m (33 ft 2 in)
- Wing area: 14.1 m^{2} (152 sq ft)
- Empty weight: 95 kg (210 lb)
- Gross weight: 204 kg (450 lb)
- Fuel capacity: 10 litres (2.2 imp gal; 2.6 US gal)
- Powerplant: 1 × Zenoah G-25 single cylinder, two stroke aircraft engine, 16 kW (21 hp)

Performance

- Maximum speed: 93 km/h (58 mph, 50 kn)
- Cruise speed: 72 km/h (45 mph, 39 kn)
- Stall speed: 40 km/h (25 mph, 22 kn)
- Range: 130 km (80 mi, 70 nmi)
- Service ceiling: 5,500 m (18,000 ft)
- g limits: +6/-3
- Rate of climb: 3.0 m/s (600 ft/min)
- Rate of sink: 1.5 m/s (300 ft/min)
