= Cosmos ULM =

Aircraft manufacturer

- Company type: Private company
- Industry: Aerospace
- Key people: General Manager: Daniel Harruch
- Products: Ultralight trikes
- Website: www.cosmos-ultralight.com

Cosmos ULM (Ultra Léger Motorisé, English: Motorized Ultralight), also called Cosmos Ultralight SA de CV, is an ultralight trike aircraft manufacturer that was originally based in Fontaine-lès-Dijon, France. Its aircraft are supplied as factory completed aircraft and are not available as kits.

The company went bankrupt in the late 2000s and was reformed as Cosmos Ultralight in Puente de Ixtla, Mexico.

== Aircraft ==
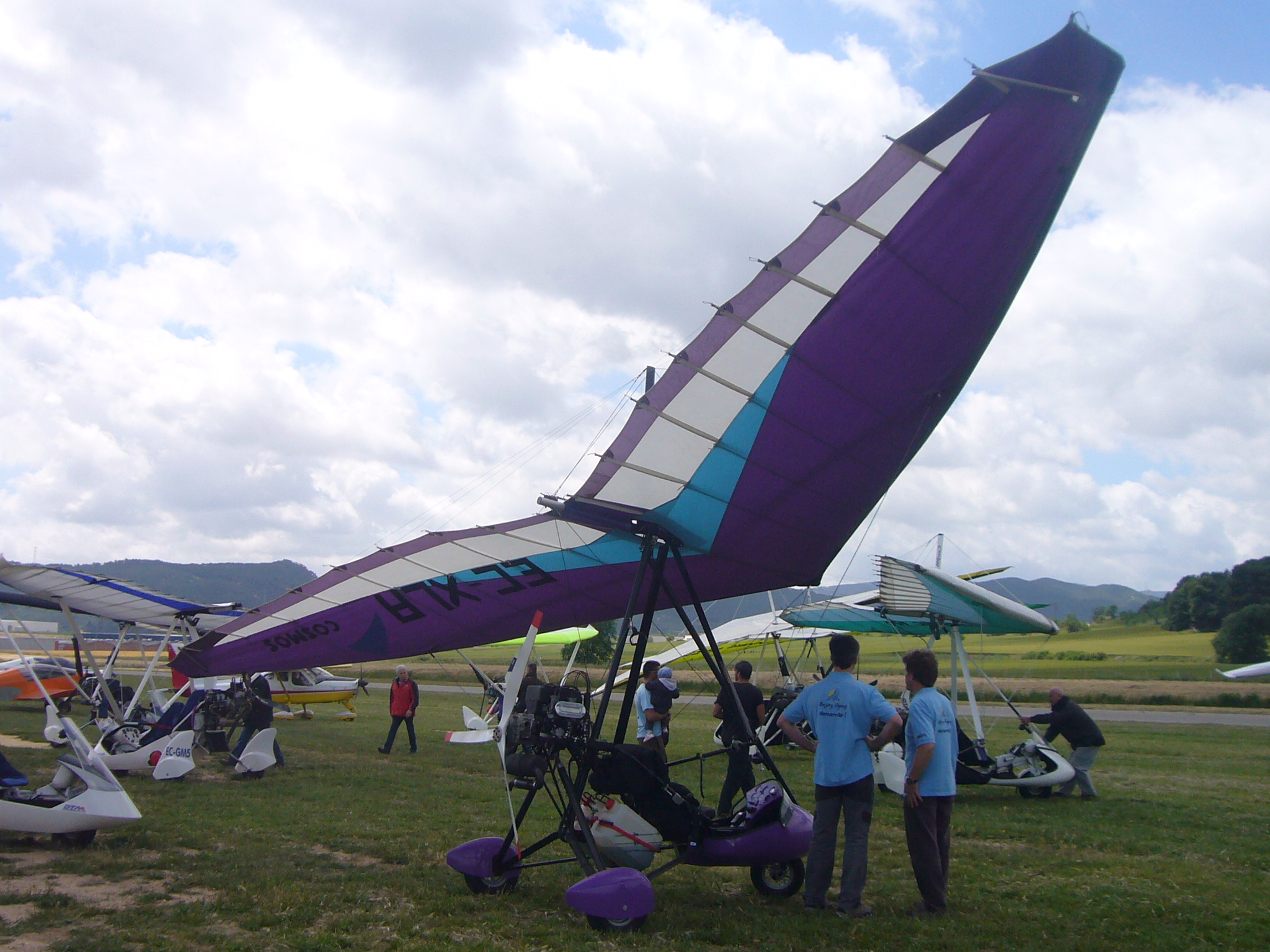
A Cosmos ultralight trike at the Aerosport air show in 2013

Summary of aircraft built by Cosmos
Model name	First flight	Number built	Type
Cosmos Bison			ultralight trike
Cosmos Echo			ultralight trike
Cosmos Samba			ultralight trike
Cosmos Phase II			ultralight trike
Cosmos Phase III			ultralight trike
