= Fly Air Swallow =

Bulgarian ultralight trike

Swallow

General information
- Type: Ultralight trike
- National origin: Bulgaria
- Manufacturer: Fly Air Limited
- Status: Production completed

History
- Introduction date: 2007

The Fly Air Swallow is a Bulgarian ultralight trike, designed and produced by Fly Air Limited of Pravets. When it was available the aircraft was supplied as a complete ready-to-fly-aircraft.

== Design and development ==
The Swallow was designed to comply with the Fédération Aéronautique Internationale microlight category, including the category's maximum gross weight of 450 kg (992 lb). The aircraft is a "cozy" two seater, with the occupants both sitting very close together.

The Swallow features a cable-braced hang glider-style high-wing, weight-shift controls, a two-seats-in-tandem open cockpit with a cockpit fairing, tricycle landing gear and a single engine in pusher configuration.

The aircraft carriage structure is made from welded stainless steel tubing, with its single surface wing covered in Dacron sailcloth. Its 10.4 m (34.1 ft) span wing is supported by a single tube-type kingpost and uses an "A" frame weight-shift control bar. The powerplant is a twin cylinder, air-cooled, two-stroke, dual-ignition 50 hp (37 kW) Rotax 503, with the liquid-cooled 64 hp (48 kW) Rotax 582 engine optional. Main landing gear suspension is provided. The aircraft has an empty weight of 131 kg (289 lb) and full fuel capacity of 25 litres (5.5 imp gal; 6.6 US gal).

The standard wings offered with the basic carriage were the La Mouette Ipsos series, in wing areas of 12, 14, 16 and 16.9 square metres.

== Specifications (Swallow with La Mouette Ipsos 16 wing) ==
Data from Bayerl

General characteristics

- Crew: one
- Capacity: one passenger
- Wingspan: 10.4 m (34 ft 1 in)
- Wing area: 15.6 m^{2} (168 sq ft)
- Empty weight: 131 kg (289 lb)
- Fuel capacity: 25 litres (5.5 imp gal; 6.6 US gal)
- Powerplant: 1 × Rotax 503 twin cylinder, air-cooled, two stroke aircraft engine, 37 kW (50 hp)
- Propellers: 3-bladed composite

Performance

- Maximum speed: 110 km/h (68 mph, 59 kn)
- Stall speed: 48 km/h (30 mph, 26 kn)

== See also ==
- Fly Air Trike Moster
