= World Seair Corp Seair =

American ultralight trike flying boat

Seair

General information
- Type: Ultralight trike flying boat
- National origin: United States
- Manufacturer: World Seair Corporation
- Status: Production completed

History
- Introduction date: July 1998

The World Seair Corp Seair is an American ultralight trike flying boat that was designed and produced by World Seair Corporation. The aircraft was supplied as a completed, read-to-fly aircraft and introduced in July 1998.

A successor company, Seair Technologies currently produces a similar concept, but different design aircraft, the Seair Technologies Seair Flying Boat that first flew circa 2002.

== Design and development ==
The Seair was designed as a US FAR 103 Ultralight Vehicles two-seat trainer. The aircraft has a standard empty weight of 251 lb (114 kg). It features a cable-braced hang glider-style high-wing, weight-shift controls, a two-seats-in-tandem open cockpit, inflatable boat hull and a single engine in pusher configuration.

The aircraft consists of a rigid-bottomed hull, with four independent air chambers, plus two inflatable outriggers. The trike wing is made from bolted-together aluminum tubing, with its single surface wing covered in Dacron sailcloth. The 33 ft (10.1 m) span wing is supported by a single tube-type kingpost and uses an "A" frame control bar. An optional water rudder is controlled by foot pedals. An instrument panel is provided near the bow of the hull. The standard factory-supplied engine was the twin cylinder, two-stroke, air-cooled Rotax 503 of 50 hp (37 kW), with the liquid-cooled Rotax 582 of 64 hp (48 kW) optional.

The hull can be deflated and the wing folded for storage, ground transportation or stowage on a larger vessel. The aircraft can be assembled for flight in 20 minutes.

== Specifications (Seair) ==
Data from Cliche

General characteristics

- Crew: one
- Capacity: one passenger
- Length: 9 ft 2 in (2.79 m)
- Wingspan: 33 ft 0 in (10.06 m)
- Wing area: 200 sq ft (19 m^{2})
- Empty weight: 251 lb (114 kg)
- Gross weight: 700 lb (318 kg)
- Fuel capacity: 5 U.S. gallons (19 L; 4.2 imp gal)
- Powerplant: 1 × Rotax 503 twin cylinder, two-stroke, air-cooled aircraft engine, 50 hp (37 kW)

Performance

- Maximum speed: 55 mph (89 km/h, 48 kn)
- Range: 75 mi (121 km, 65 nmi)
- Service ceiling: 10,000 ft (3,000 m)
- g limits: +4/-4
