= 21st Century Airships =

Canadian research and development company

21st Century Airships Inc.
- Industry: Aviation
- Founded: 1988; 38 years ago
- Founder: Hokan Colting
- Headquarters: Canada

21st Century Airships Inc. was a Canadian airship technologies research and development company. These projects included the development of a spherical shaped airship as well as airships for high altitude, environmental research, surveillance and military applications, heavy lifting and sightseeing.

== History ==
Hokan Colting, a Canadian airship design entrepreneur, founded the seemingly now-defunct 21st Century Airships in 1988. Colting aimed at designing an airship that could be cheaper to operate, and easier to control. The 21st Century Airships holds the world record for altitude reached in an airship at 6,400 metres. It is also one of the companies who attempted to develop airships for use in communications. His concept involved the construction of ships that can route cellular phone and wireless data above atmospheric interference and without the need for towers and satellites.

21st Century Airships Inc. was able to build ships for the U.S. Air Force and private companies such as Dex Flying Pictures.

== See also ==
- High-altitude airship
