= Flylab Tucano =

Italian ultralight aircraft

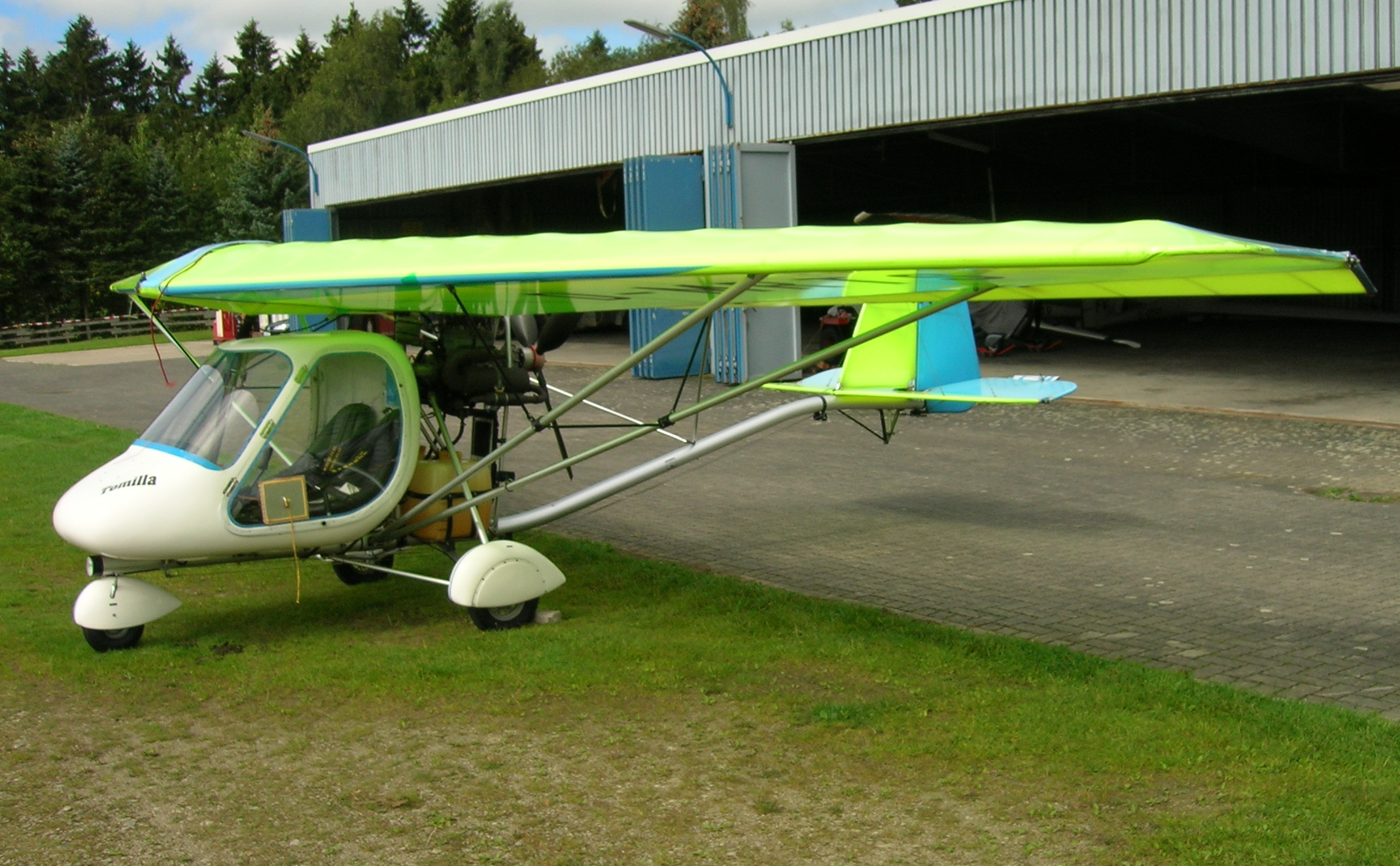
- Flylab Tucano V

General information
- Type: Ultralight aircraft
- National origin: Italy
- Manufacturer: Ferrari ULM; Flylab
- Status: In production

History
- Developed from: Chotia Weedhopper

The Flylab Tucano (English: Toucan) is an Italian ultralight aircraft, produced by Flylab, of Ischitella. The aircraft is supplied as a kit for amateur construction or as a complete ready-to-fly-aircraft. The aircraft was produced in the 1990s by Ferrari ULM of Castelbaldo.

== Design and development ==
The Tucano is a derivative of the Chotia Weedhopper and was designed to comply with the Fédération Aéronautique Internationale microlight rules with the design goal of being a low-cost aircraft. It features a strut-braced parasol wing, a two-seats-in-side-by-side configuration enclosed or open cockpit, fixed tricycle landing gear or floats and a single engine in pusher configuration or on some models twin engines in centreline thrust arrangement.

The aircraft is made from bolted-together aluminum tubing, with its flying surfaces covered in Dacron sailcloth. Its 10.17 m (33.4 ft) span wing has an area of 17 m^{2} (180 sq ft) and is supported by V-struts and jury struts. There is a cabane strut that passes through the windshield and cockpit area. The aircraft is built around a central bent aluminum keel tube that runs from the cockpit to the tail. Controls are standard three-axis type. Standard engines available are the 50 hp (37 kW) Rotax 503 and 64 hp (48 kW) Rotax 582 two-stroke powerplants. The fuel tank is of plastic construction, mounted under the pusher engine. The Tucano V has a glide ratio of 11:1.

== Variants ==
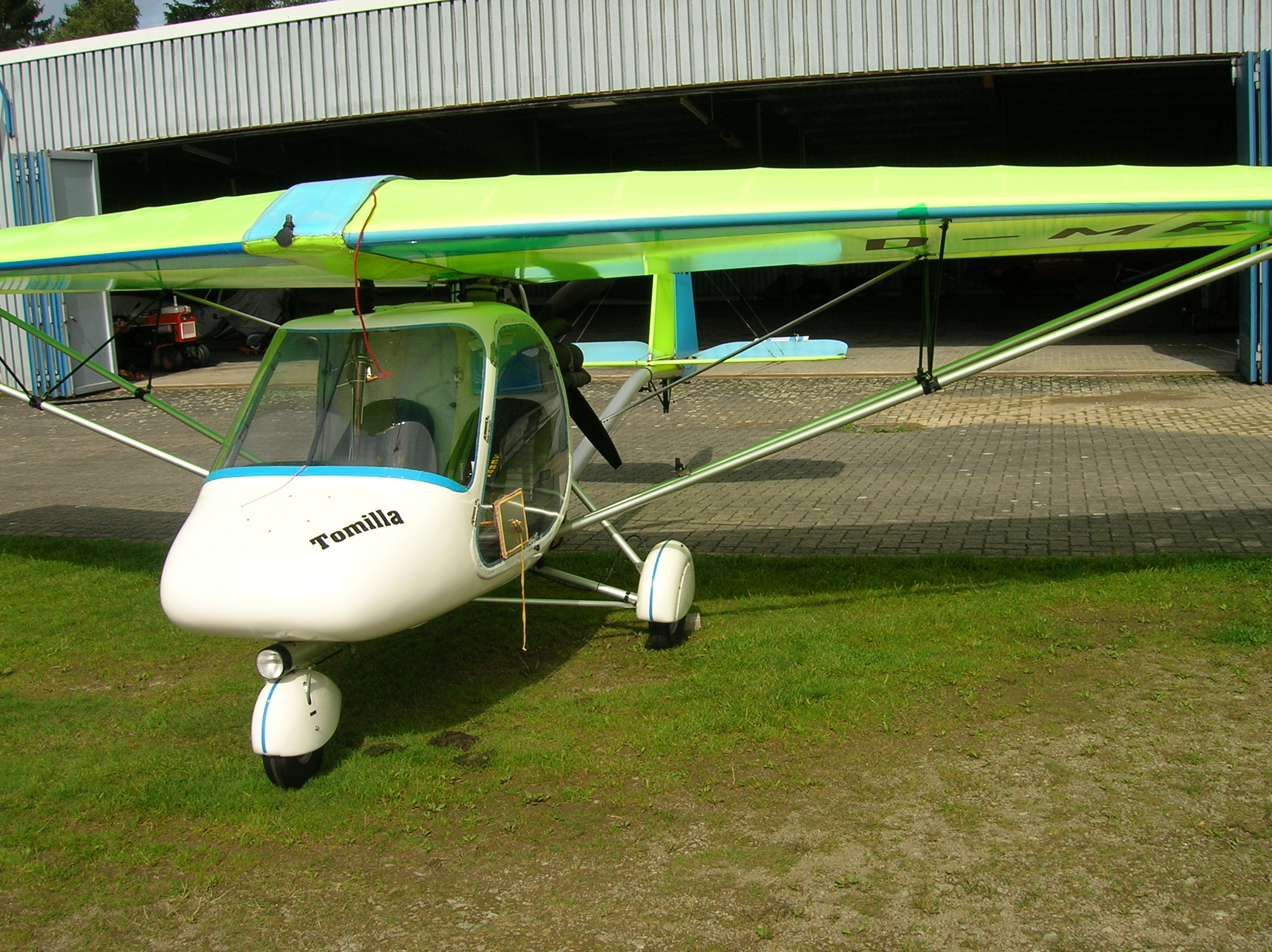
Tucano V

Tucano
Base model with Rotax 582 powerplant.
Tucano V
Improved model, with aerodynamic clean-ups and enclosed cockpit
Tucano HV
A Tucano V mounted on floats (hydro).
Tucano Delta3
Open cockpit model powered by a Rotax 503
Tucano HD3
Float-equipped model based on the Tucano Delta3, powered by a Rotax 503
Tucano HD3A
Amphibious float-equipped model based on the Tucano HD3, powered by a Rotax 503
Tucano Delta3 TW
Twin-engined (TW) version with Rotax 582 engines mounted in the nose and aft of the cockpit, based on the Tucano Delta3
Tucano Delta3 VTW
Twin-engined version with Rotax 582 engines mounted in the nose and aft of the cockpit, with the Tucano V aerodynamic and cockpit refinements
Tucano X2
Twin-engined version with Rotax 582 engines mounted in the nose and aft of the cockpit, produced in the 1990s by Ferrari ULM.

== Specifications (Tucano V) ==
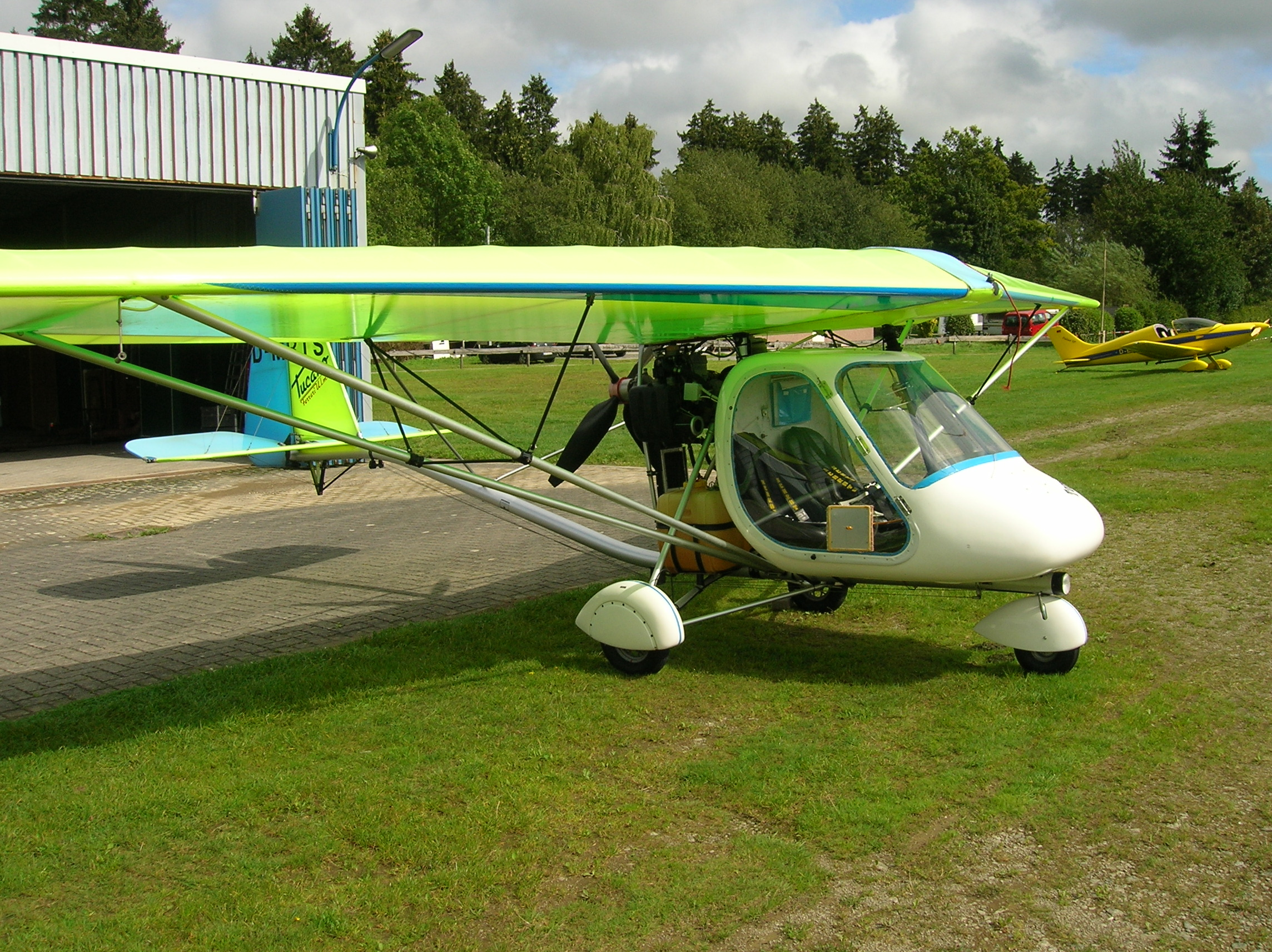
Tucano V

Data from Bayerl and Flylab

General characteristics

- Crew: one
- Capacity: one passenger
- Length: 6.30 m (20 ft 8 in)
- Wingspan: 10.17 m (33 ft 4 in)
- Height: 2.25 m (7 ft 5 in)
- Wing area: 16.99 m^{2} (182.9 sq ft)
- Empty weight: 225 kg (496 lb)
- Gross weight: 450 kg (992 lb)
- Fuel capacity: 76 litres (17 imp gal; 20 US gal)
- Powerplant: 1 × Rotax 582 twin cylinder, liquid-cooled, two stroke aircraft engine, 48 kW (64 hp)

Performance

- Maximum speed: 165 km/h (103 mph, 89 kn)
- Cruise speed: 125 km/h (78 mph, 67 kn)
- Stall speed: 52 km/h (32 mph, 28 kn)
- Never exceed speed: 170 km/h (110 mph, 92 kn)
- Maximum glide ratio: 11:1
- Rate of climb: 5.5 m/s (1,080 ft/min)
- Wing loading: 26.49 kg/m^{2} (5.43 lb/sq ft)
