= Emerald Coast XL2 Sport =

American powered parachute

XL2

General information
- Type: Powered parachute
- National origin: United States
- Manufacturer: Emerald Coast Aircraft
- Status: Production completed

History
- Introduction date: 2000

The Emerald Coast XL2 Sport is an American powered parachute that was designed and produced by Emerald Coast Aircraft.

The aircraft is no longer in production.

== Design and development ==
The aircraft was designed as a US FAR 103 Ultralight Vehicles two-seat trainer. It features a parachute-style high-wing, two seats in tandem, tricycle landing gear and a single 50 hp (37 kW) Rotax 503 engine in pusher configuration.

The aircraft is built from a combination of bolted and welded 4130 steel tubing. In flight steering is accomplished via foot pedals that actuate the canopy brakes via a 2:1 ratio block system, creating roll and yaw. On the ground the aircraft has lever-controlled nosewheel steering. The main landing gear incorporates sprung steel landing gear with large tundra tires.

When it was in production the XL2 was supplied in a number of forms. It could be purchased as a fully assembled and test flown aircraft, for US$ 9000 in 2003. It was also available as a just the basic carriage for US$3000 in 2003, with the buyer supplying his or her own canopy, instruments, engine and propeller. The company also built custom versions to order.

== Specifications (XL2 Sport) ==
Data from Cliche

General characteristics

- Crew: one
- Capacity: one passenger
- Wing area: 550 sq ft (51 m^{2})
- Empty weight: 289 lb (131 kg)
- Fuel capacity: 10 U.S. gallons (38 L; 8.3 imp gal)
- Powerplant: 1 × Rotax 503 twin cylinder, two-stroke, air-cooled aircraft engine, 50 hp (37 kW)

Performance

- Cruise speed: 28 mph (45 km/h, 24 kn)
- Rate of climb: 700 ft/min (3.6 m/s)
