= Aces High Cuby =

Canadian family of kit aircraft

Cuby

General information
- Type: Kit aircraft
- National origin: Canada
- Manufacturer: Aces High Light Aircraft
- Designer: Al Jasmine
- Status: no longer in production
- Number built: More than 200 Cuby IIs

History
- Introduction date: 1988

The Aces High Cuby is a family of Canadian single engine, high wing, strut-braced, light sports planes with conventional landing gear that was marketed for homebuilding by Aces High Light Aircraft of London, Ontario.

The aircraft design was available in two versions, the single-seat Cuby I and side-by-side two-seat Cuby II. Aces High went out of business in the 1990s and the kits are no longer available.

== Development ==
The Cuby fuselage is constructed from welded 4130 steel tubing, covered with aircraft fabric. The wings are built around an aluminum spar and D-cell and also fabric-covered. The conventional landing gear includes bungee-suspended main wheels and a steerable tail wheel.

The controls are conventional three-axis, with no flaps fitted to the wing. The aircraft were available as kits or as completed aircraft and were designed to look and fly similarly to a Piper J-3 Cub. The kit price for the Cuby I was US$11,350, including the propeller and 28 hp (21 kW) Rotax 277 engine.

The Cuby II features a 38 in (97 cm) wide cabin and a large baggage compartment behind the side-by-side seats. The aircraft was certified and put into production in Hungary for sale in Europe. In North America the Cuby II was sold for US$15,662.76, complete with propeller, 50 hp (37 kW) Rotax 503 powerplant, paint and fabric in 1988. Available options included folding wings, floats and an agricultural spray kit.

Reviewer Ken Armstrong, flying the Cuby II prototype with the 42 hp (31 kW) single carburetor version of the Rotax 503 said:

Takeoff was accomplished in 300 feet at an indicated airspeed of 30 mph. The climb-out was steep enough to leave the spectators' mouths agape.

I'm pleased to mention that the delightfully balanced rudder was smooth and linear in response—the best I've felt in an ultralight or homebuilt. Controls were moderately light, and the Cuby had very quick response.

Having no flaps or other drag-producing devices, we resorted to the time-proven sideslip to steepen our approaches, up to 1200 fpm. Touch and goes in the Cuby were so much fun that several abbreviated pattern circuits ensued, with a half dozen landings accomplished in ten minutes.

== Variants ==
Cuby I
Single seat, standard engine 28 hp (21 kW) Rotax 277, qualified as a US FAR 103 Ultralight Vehicle with an empty weight of 250 lb (113 kg) and as Canadian basic ultra-light, advanced ultra-light or amateur-built aircraft
Cuby II
Two seat, standard engine 50 hp (37 kW) Rotax 503, qualified as a US amateur-built and Canadian basic ultra-light, advanced ultra-light or amateur-built aircraft. More than 200 completed and flying.

== Specifications (Cuby II) ==
General characteristics

- Crew: one, pilot
- Capacity: 1 passenger
- Length: 5.56 m (18 ft 3 in)
- Wingspan: 10.21 m (33 ft 6 in)
- Height: 1.77 m (5 ft 10 in)
- Wing area: 15 m^{2} (161 sq ft)
- Aspect ratio: 6.95
- Empty weight: 188 kg (413 lb)
- Gross weight: 480 kg (1,058 lb)
- Powerplant: 1 × Rotax 503 , 39 kW (52 hp)

Performance

- Maximum speed: 160 km/h (100 mph, 86 kn)
- Range: 230 km (143 mi, 124 nmi)
- Rate of climb: 3.6 m/s (700 ft/min)

== See also ==
Aircraft of comparable role, configuration, and era

- Buzzman L'il Buzzard

Related lists

- List of civil aircraft
