= Chadwick C-122 =

C-122
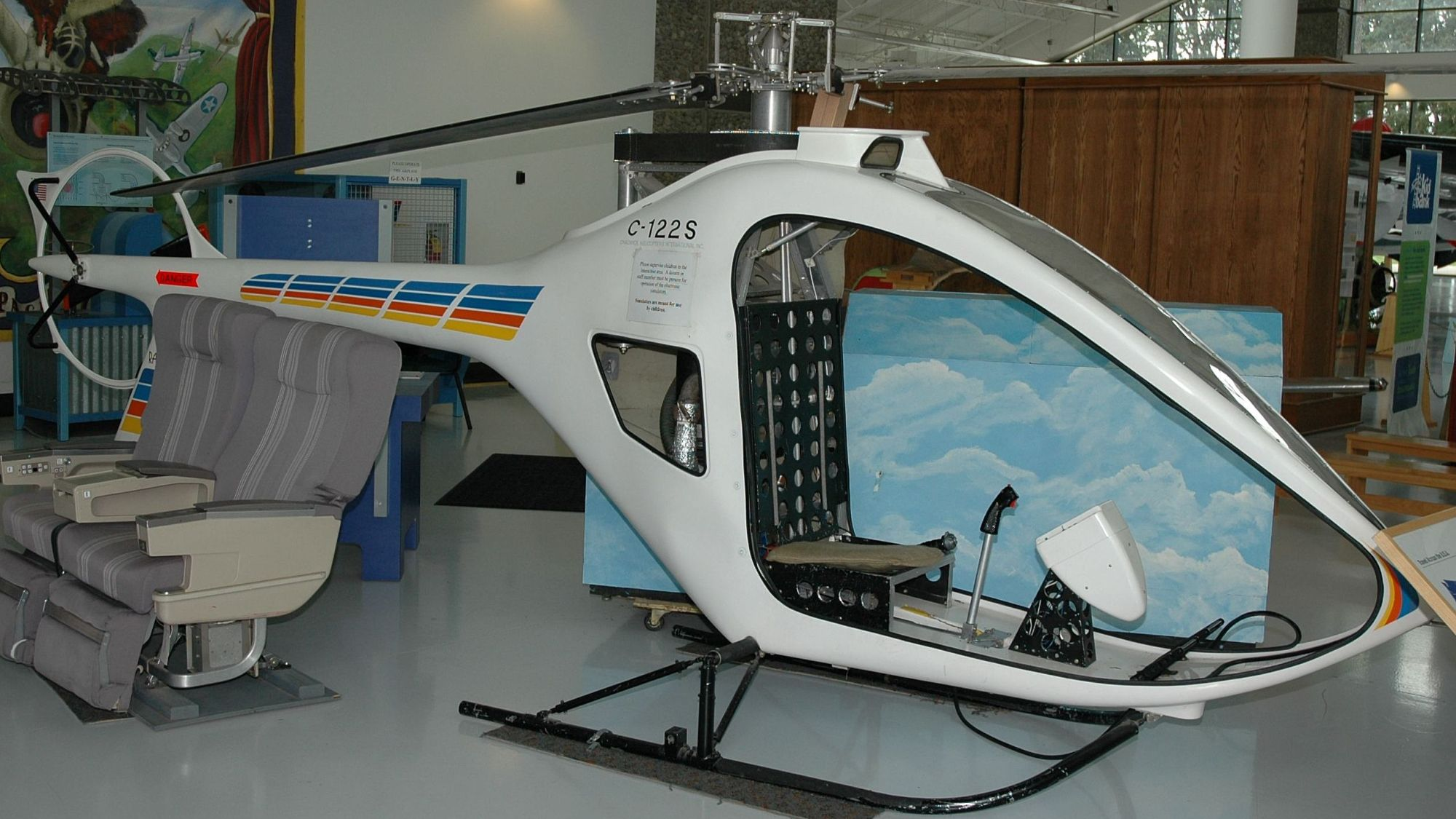

General information
- Type: Ultralight utility helicopter
- Manufacturer: Chadwick Helicopters

History
- First flight: 1985

The Chadwick C-122 was a single-seat ultralight helicopter developed in the United States in the 1980s. It was a minimalist design consisting of a fibreglass shell enclosing a truss structure to which the engine, rotor mast, landing gear, and pilot's seat were attached. A wide variety of roles were envisaged for the aircraft, and therefore it was equipped with attachment points for spray bars, a cargo hook, external cargo racks, and even weapons for law enforcement work. The skid-type undercarriage could be quickly fitted with wheels for ground-handling, or floats for operations from water.

A prototype was constructed in 1985, and publicly unveiled at the Helicopter Association International annual convention the following year. Flight testing continued through 1987, with deliveries anticipated for that Autumn.

== Variants proposed ==
- C-122S - basic single-seat utility version
- C-122T - two-seat version
- C-122AG - agricultural version
- C-122PI - "Police interceptor" version
- C-122R - RPV version
- C-122W - armed ("weapons") version

A tethered helicopter training platform based on the C-122 was also proposed

== Specifications (C-122S) ==
General characteristics

- Crew: One pilot
- Length: 19 ft 0 in (5.79 m)
- Height: 7 ft 2 in (2.19 m)
- Empty weight: 253 lb (115 kg)
- Gross weight: 500 lb (227 kg)
- Powerplant: 1 × Rotax 503 , 63 hp (47 kW)
- Main rotor diameter: 18 ft 6 in (5.64 m)
- Main rotor area: 269 sq ft (25.0 m^{2})

Performance

- Maximum speed: 115 mph (185 km/h, 100 kn)
- Range: 120 mi (193 km, 100 nmi)
- Service ceiling: 13,480 ft (4,110 m)
