= Vikýřovice =

- Municipality
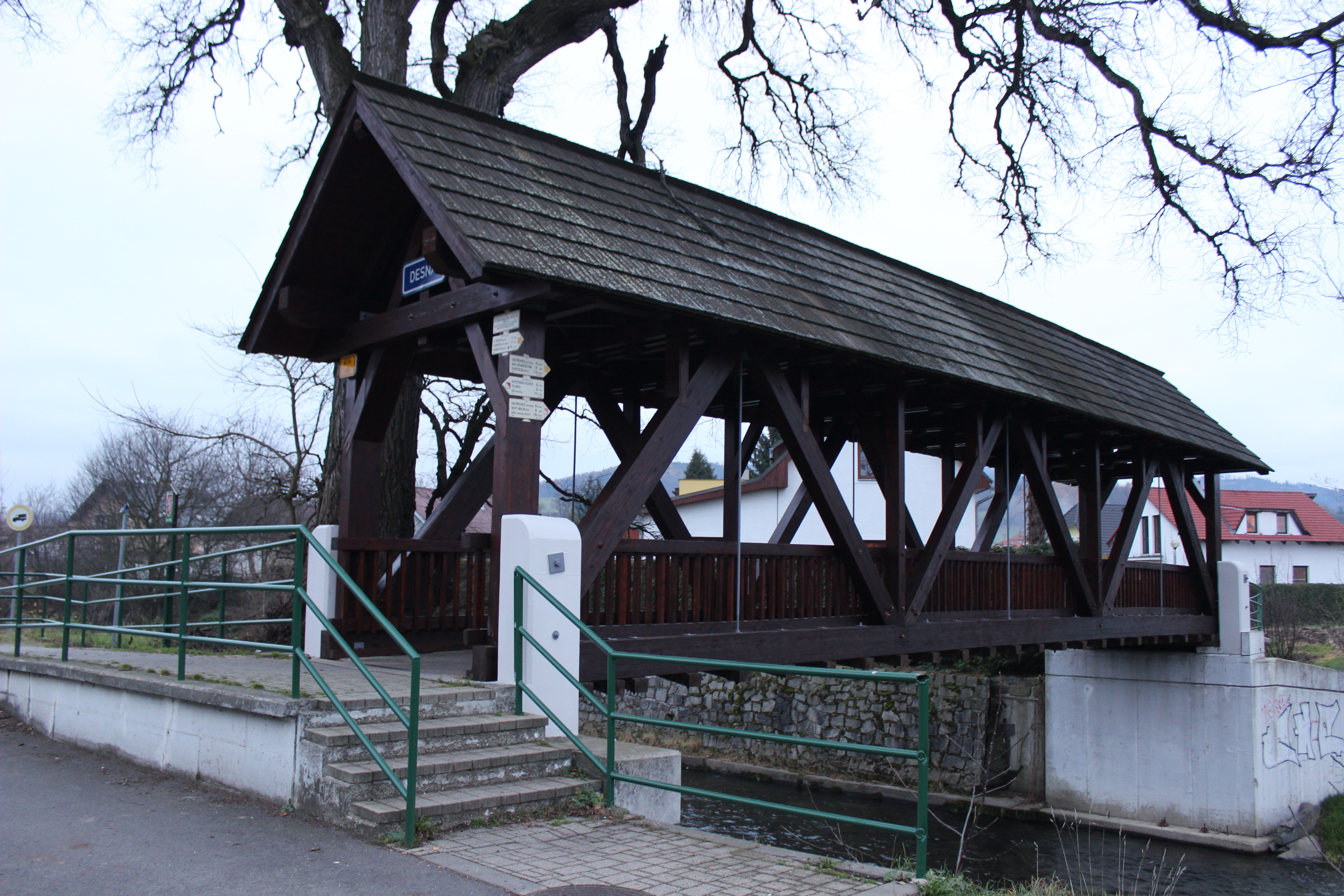
- Wooden bridge in Vikýřovice

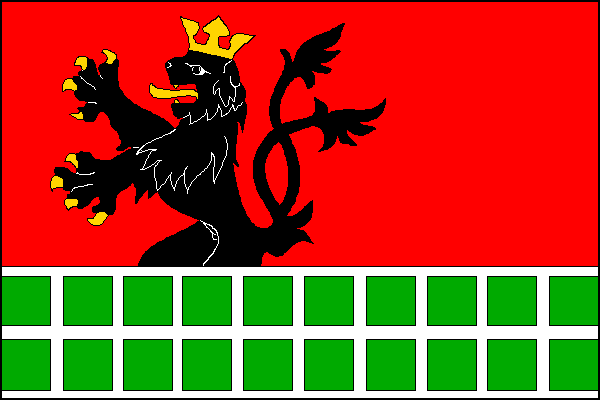
- Flag Coat of arms

- Location in the Czech Republic
- Coordinates: 49°58′41″N 17°0′45″E
- Country: Czech Republic
- Region: Olomouc
- District: Šumperk
- First mentioned: 1391

Area
  - Total: 11.75 km^{2} (4.54 sq mi)
- Elevation: 335 m (1,099 ft)

Population (2026-01-01)
  - Total: 2,290
  - Density: 195/km^{2} (505/sq mi)
- Time zone: UTC+1 (CET)
  - Summer (DST): UTC+2 (CEST)
- Postal code: 788 13
- Website: www.vikyrovice.cz

Vikýřovice (German: Weikersdorf) is a municipality and village in Šumperk District in the Olomouc Region of the Czech Republic. It has about 2,300 inhabitants.

== Geography ==
Vikýřovice is located about 2 kilometres (1 mi) northeast of Šumperk and 46 km (29 mi) north of Olomouc. It lies in the Hanušovice Highlands. The highest point is a hill at 746 m (2,448 ft) above sea level. The Desná River flows along the western municipal border.

== History ==
The first written mention is in a deed of Margrave Jobst of Moravia from 1391. For centuries, it was part of the Velké Losiny estate.

In 1975–1990, Vikýřovice was a municipal part of Šumperk. From 1990, it has been an independent municipality. Vikýřovice was badly damaged by the 1997 Central European flood.

== Demographics ==
Historical population

Year	Pop.	±%
1869	1,086	—
1880	1,231	+13.4%
1890	1,344	+9.2%
1900	1,444	+7.4%
1910	1,657	+14.8%

Year	Pop.	±%
1921	1,722	+3.9%
1930	1,997	+16.0%
1950	1,425	−28.6%
1961	1,639	+15.0%
1970	1,624	−0.9%

Year	Pop.	±%
1980	1,799	+10.8%
1991	1,859	+3.3%
2001	2,022	+8.8%
2011	2,260	+11.8%
2021	2,177	−3.7%

Source: Censuses

== Economy ==
Verner Motor company, a producer of aircraft engines, is based in Vikýřovice.

== Transport ==
The I/11 road (the section from Šumperk to Ostrava) runs through the municipality.

Vikýřovice is located on the railway line Nezamyslice–Kouty nad Desnou via Olomouc.

== Sights ==
The only protected cultural monuments in the municipality is a Calvary sculpture from 1815.
