= APEV =

French aircraft manufacturer

- Company type: Voluntary association
- Industry: Aerospace
- Founded: 1997
- Founder: Daniel Dalby
- Products: Kit aircraft and aircraft plans
- Number of employees: nine
- Website: www.pouchel.com

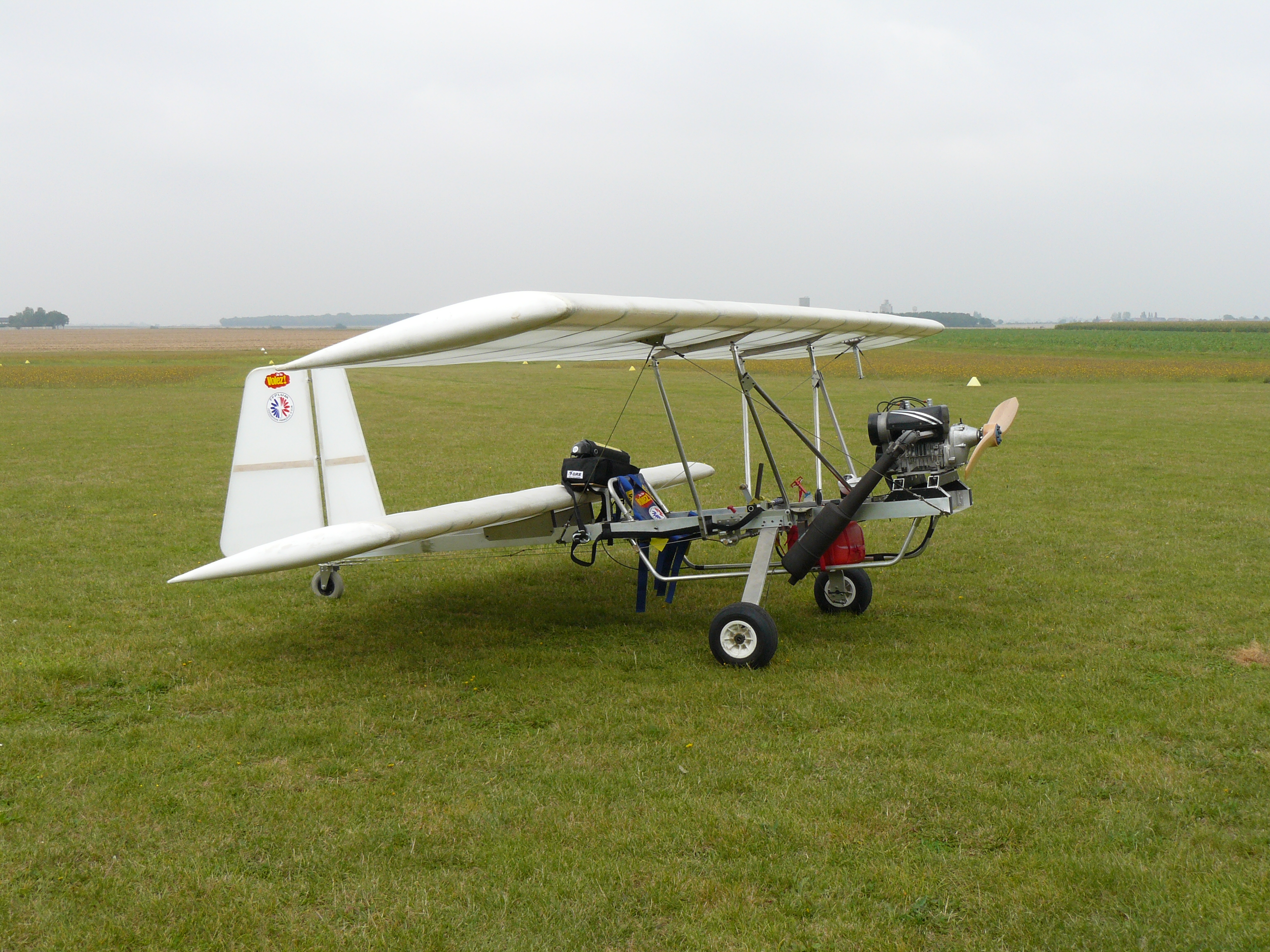
A Pouchel II

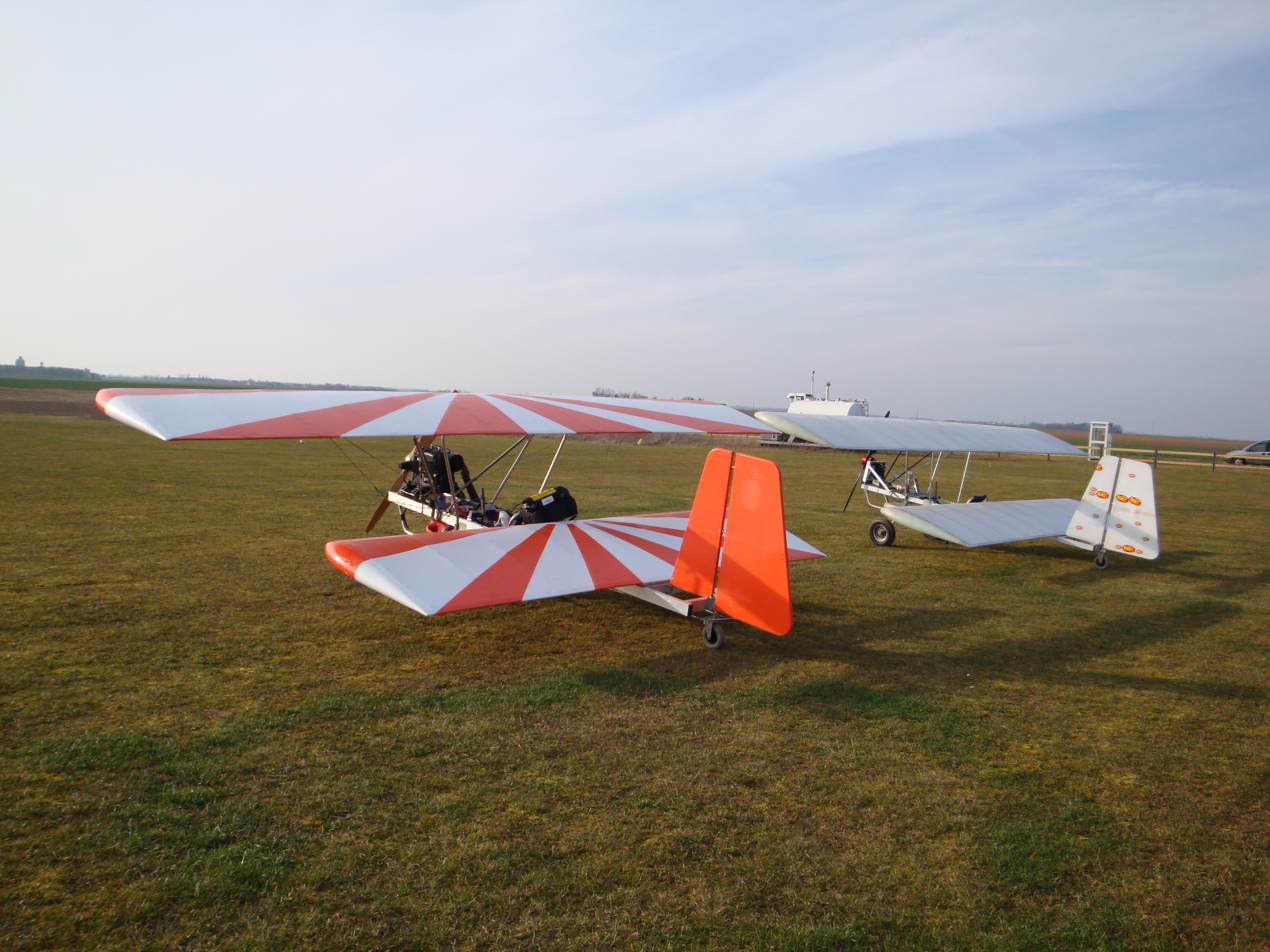
A petrol powered Pouchel (foreground) and a Pouchelec (background)

APEV (Association pour la Promotion des Echelles Volantes, English: Association for the Promotion of Flying Ladders) is a French aircraft manufacturer, founded by Daniel Dalby in 1997 and based in Peynier. The organization specializes in the design and manufacture of very light and inexpensive homebuilt aircraft.

The original design, the Pouchel, was based upon the 1930s Henri Mignet-designed Mignet Pou-du-Ciel (Flying Flea), but constructed using three commercial household aluminium ladders to save construction time, cost and weight. The aircraft first flew on 14 March 1999 and 120 sets of plans were quickly sold. When the ladder manufacturer no longer wanted to sell ladders for aircraft construction, due to liability concerns, Dalby redesigned the aircraft to use aeronautical rectangular aluminium tubing instead, which resulted in a lighter and cheaper aircraft, the Pouchel II. This was further refined into the Pouchel Light and an electric powered version, the Pouchelec. Further designs followed these, including the two seat Bipouchel and the Pouchel Classic.

== Aircraft ==
Summary of aircraft built by APEV
Model name	First flight	Number built	Type
APEV Bipouchel			two seat ultralight aircraft
APEV Cubchel			single seat ultralight aircraft based on the Afford-A-Plane
APEV Demoichelle			single seat ultralight aircraft based on the 1908 Santos-Dumont Demoiselle
APEV Pouchel	1999		single seat ultralight aircraft constructed from three ladders
APEV Pouchel II			single seat ultralight aircraft
APEV Pouchel Light			single seat ultralight aircraft
APEV Pouchelec			single seat electric aircraft
APEV Pouchel Classic			single seat ultralight aircraft
APEV Scoutchel			single seat ultralight aircraft
