= Landray GL.03 =

GL.03 Pouss Pou

General information
- Type: One or two seat tandem wing sports aircraft
- National origin: France
- Designer: Gilbert Landray
- Number built: 1

History
- First flight: August 1980

The Landray GL.03 Pouss Pou was a small, pusher configuration tandem wing aircraft built in France in the early 1980s. Only one was completed, though it was much modified.

== Design and development ==
Like his earlier two, aircraft Gilbert Landray's GL.03 Pouss Pou (Push Flea) was a tandem wing aircraft in the two-axis control Mignet Pou-du-Ciel style. It differed chiefly from the GL.01 and GL.02 in its twin fin, pusher configuration. It also had a tricycle undercarriage. It was an entirely wood-framed aircraft with fabric covering.

The original, 1980, GL.03 had much in common with the GL.02. It shared the same wings, where the rear span was 1.0 m (3 ft 3 in) less than that of the forward one, as well as using the same modified 20 kW (27 hp) modified Citroen Ami 8 motorcar air-cooled flat-twin engine. Tests led to modifications of the wings so they had almost equal span and to the installation of a new engine. The revised GL.03 is described below.

Mignet designs are controlled in pitch by changing the incidence of the forward wing. To do this the forward, upper wing of the GL.03 was mounted on four co-linear pivot points. The inner pair of these were at the top of two almost vertical faired struts from the upper fuselage longerons and the outer pair on inverted, outward leaning V-struts from the same fuselage members. Vertical links from the rear of the wing ran externally to the lower fuselage, where they were connected to the control column. There were no ailerons. Both forward and rear wings were essentially rectangular, apart from slightly tapered and turned-up tips. The rear wing was mounted on top of the upper longerons.

The fuselage of the GL.03 was flat sided, with rounded upper decking. The single seat cockpit was close to the nose, ahead of the forward wing's leading edge and enclosed under a side hinged, one piece canopy which merged into the rear decking at the wing struts without change of height. There was provision for a second, tandem cockpit but the GL.03's 30 kW (40 hp) Citroën GS612 four cylinder engine was not powerful enough to lift two adults. This engine was positioned at the centre of the rear wing, it and the fuselage extending just far enough behind the trailing edge to allow clearance for the two blade propeller. There were small cooling air entry ducts on the cowling sides above the wing.

In place of the conventional tails of the GL.01 and GL.02 tractor designs, the pusher GL.03 had twin straight edged, strongly tapered fins on the rear wing. They extended below the wing and their trailing edges coincided with its. Each fin carried a balanced rudder. There was a simple, fixed tricycle undercarriage with the main wheels on narrow, almost horizontal cantilever legs which reached out from the lower fuselage, producing a 1.60 m (5 ft 3 in) track.

The Pouss Pou first flew in August 1980 (Note: Etienne-Claude Landray recalls the year as 1979, a year earlier than Gaillard. Chillon's entry on F-PYIL does not list the first flight date but does note that the registration was reserved in July 1980, a month before Gaiilard's first flight date.) and obtained its Certificate of Airworthiness on 21 July 1981. It took part in the 1981 RSA rally where it was awarded the SFACT Cup. After that success the GL.03 was modified into the GL.31 tandem seat version. This had a more powerful 37 kW (50 hp) Citroën engine and a forward wing with a span increased to 8.0 m (26 ft 3 in) , centrally supported by tubular, inverted V pairs in place of the vertical, faired struts. The second seat was enclosed by a separately side hinged canopy which extended back to the leading edge of the rear wing. At about the same time the wheels were enclosed by spats.

Some years later the Pouss Pou was successfully re-engined with a Rotax flat twin but was eventually damaged in a landing accident at Libourne. It remained on the French civil aircraft register in 2014.

== Specifications (1981 GL.03 version) ==
Data from Jane's All the World's Aircraft 1981-1982 p.487

General characteristics

- Capacity: One
- Length: 4.05 m (13 ft 3 in)
- Upper wingspan: 6.45 m (21 ft 2 in)
- Lower wingspan: 6.35 m (20 ft 10 in) rear wing
- Empty weight: 220 kg (485 lb)
- Gross weight: 343 kg (756 lb)
- Powerplant: 1 × Citroën GS612 four cylinder piston engine, 30 kW (40 hp)
- Propellers: 2-bladed, 1.36 m (4 ft 6 in) diameter

Performance

- Maximum speed: 150 km/h (93 mph, 81 kn)
- Cruise speed: 130 km/h (81 mph, 70 kn)
- Endurance: 3 hr
