= Dalby Pouchel =

APEV Pouchel
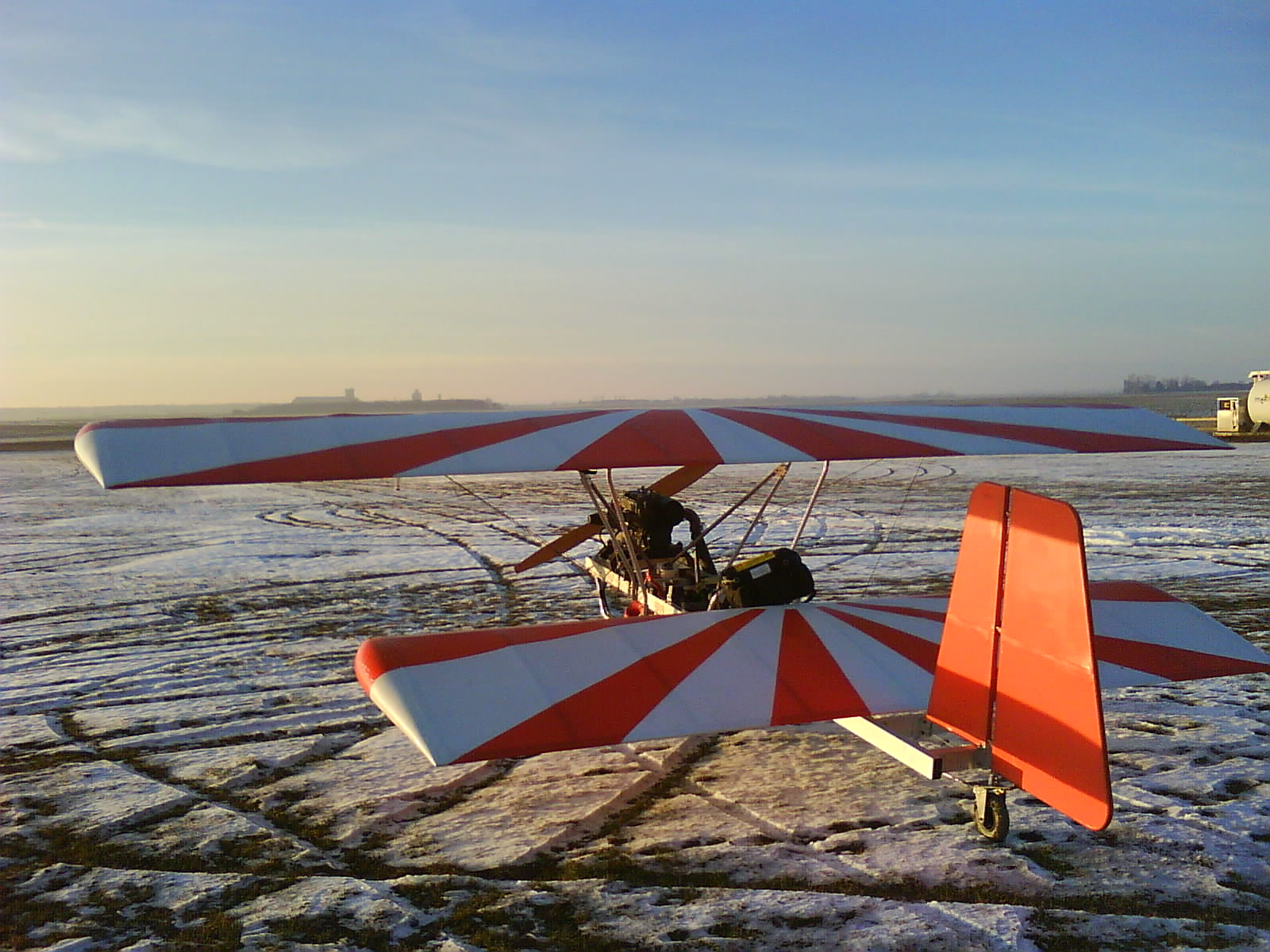
- Pouchel

General information
- Type: Single-seat homebuilt aircraft
- Manufacturer: APEV
- Designer: Daniel Dalby

History
- First flight: 26 June 1999

The Pouchel (also known as the Ladder Flea) is a single-seat ultralight aircraft designed by Daniel Dalby and produced by APEV. The aircraft was designed for amateur construction and first flown in 1999.

== Design and development ==
The Pouchel I was conceived in 1997 by French engineer Daniel Dalby. The aim was to design an easy-to-build ultralight aircraft based on the formula, principles and writings of Henri Mignet. The core of the construction employed commercial aluminium ladders in the fuselage and as spars in both wings. The wings were assembled using styrofoam ribs, and were fabric-covered. It was powered by a Fuji engine, developing less than 15 hp. Controls were similar to Mignet Pou-du-Ciel designs, with a pivoting front wing and rudder, both operated by the control column via control rods and no foot pedals. After test hops and modifications, on 26 June 1999, Daniel Dalby piloted the Pouchel on its first true flight at Salon Eyguieres.

In 2002, after many plans had been sold to other amateur constructors, the ladder manufacturer refused to sell its products for this purpose, due to concerns about liability and insurance. The aircraft was then redesigned to replace the ladders with rectangular-section aluminium tubes (100 x 50 mm), becoming the Pouchel II, with a Rotax 447 engine and an empty weight of about 150 kg (331 lb). Subsequently, the Pouchel II was superseded by the APEV Pouchel Light, with an empty weight of about 100 kg (220 lb). A closely related aircraft in the same family is the APEV Demoichelle. Plans and kits are distributed by the APEV (Association pour la Promotion des Echelles Volantes, or in English, Association for the Promotion of Flying Ladders).

== Variants ==
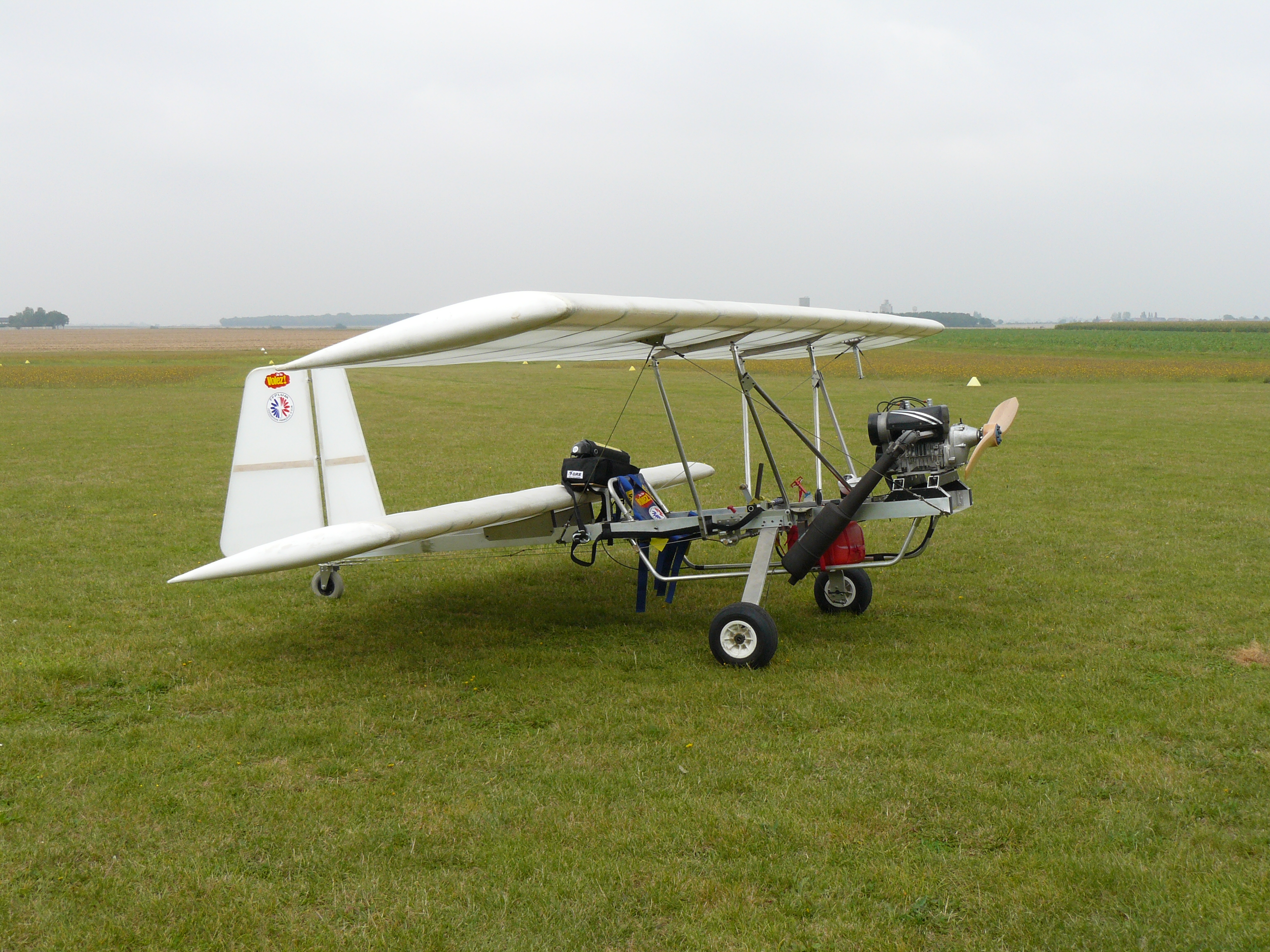
A Pouchel II

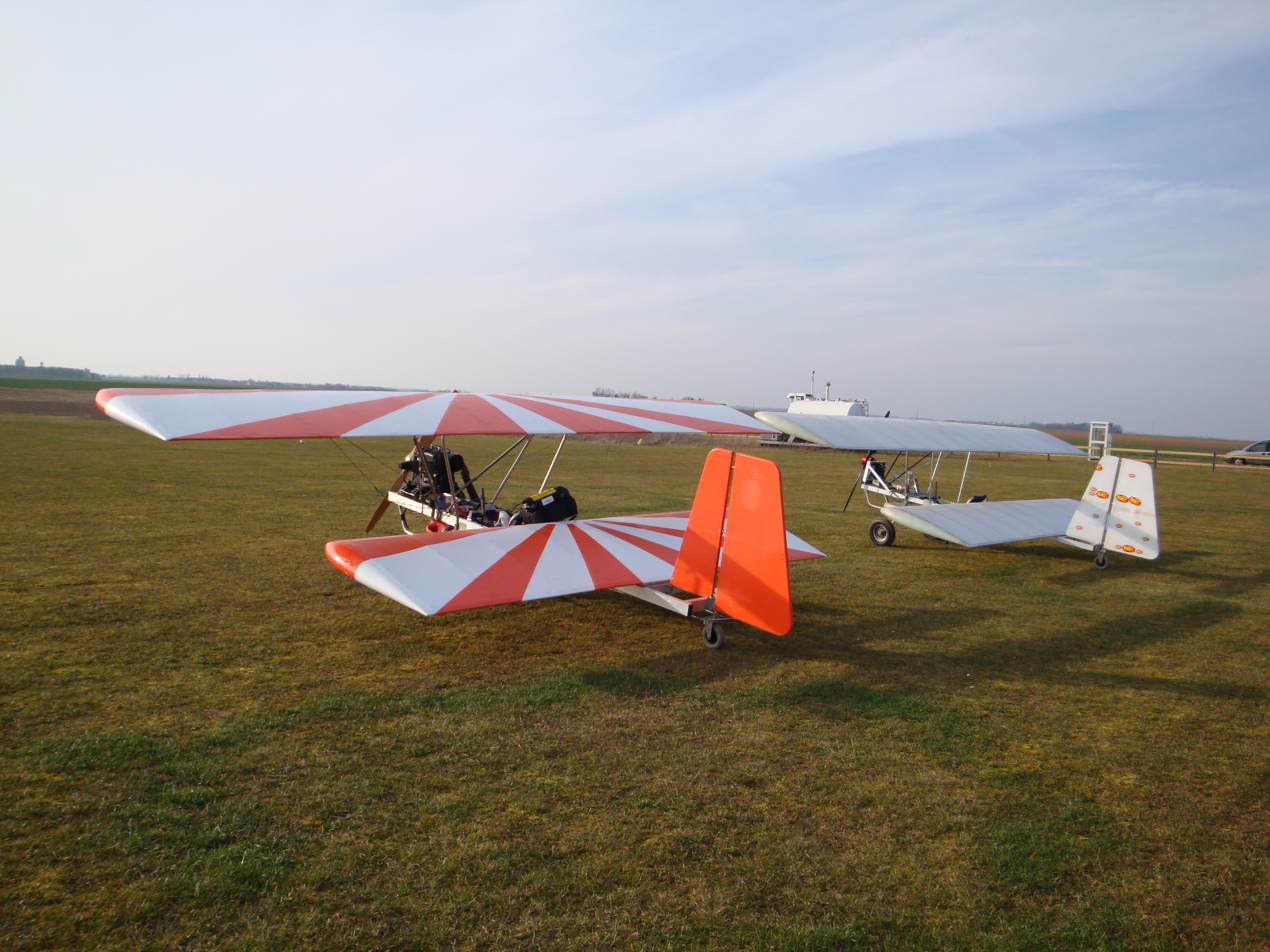
A gasoline-powered Pouchel (foreground) and a Pouchelec (background)

Bipouchel
tandem two-seater
HydroPouchel
the Pouchel seaplane, still at the prototype stage
Pouchel II
Version of the original Pouchel, but built without ladders
Pouchel Classic
with a fuselage made of wood
Pouchelec
with 12 kW electric motor, also at the prototype stage.
Pouchel Light
In 2012 the principal production version

== Specifications (Pouchel Light) ==
Data from APEV (2011)

General characteristics

- Length: 4.4 m (14 ft 5 in)
- Wingspan: 6 m (19 ft 8 in)
- Height: 1.7 m (5 ft 7 in)
- Wing area: 12 m^{2} (130 sq ft)
- Empty weight: 100 kg (220 lb)
- Max takeoff weight: 250 kg (551 lb)
- Powerplant: 1 × Rotax 377 2-cylinder air-cooled 2-stroke in-line piston engine, 26 kW (35 hp) (or Rotax 447 - 41.6 kW (55.8 hp))
- Propellers: 2-bladed propeller

Performance

- Maximum speed: 120 km/h (75 mph, 65 kn)
- Cruise speed: 90 km/h (56 mph, 49 kn)
- Stall speed: 40 km/h (25 mph, 22 kn)
