= APEV Pouchel Light =

French homebuilt aeroplane

Pouchel Light

General information
- Type: Amateur-built aircraft
- National origin: France
- Manufacturer: APEV
- Designer: Daniel Dalby
- Status: In production (kit, 2012)

History
- Developed from: APEV Pouchel II
- Variant: APEV Pouchelec

The APEV Pouchel Light (English: Ladder Flea Light) is a French amateur-built aircraft, designed by Daniel Dalby and produced by APEV of Peynier. The aircraft is supplied as plans or as a kit for amateur construction.

== Design and development ==
The Pouchel Light replaced the Pouchel II in production, which in turn replaced the original APEV Pouchel. The original Pouchel was constructed using three commercially available aluminium ladders, hence APEV is the Association pour la Promotion des Echelles Volantes, or in English, Association for the Promotion of Flying Ladders. Later models were forced to move to rectangular aluminium tubing when the ladder manufacturer grew concerned about liability.

The Pouchel Light is a re-designed, 50 kg (110 lb) lighter version of the Pouchel II that it replaces in production, with an empty weight of 100 kg (220 lb). The Pouchel series are all derivatives of the classic 1930s Henri Mignet-designed Mignet Pou-du-Ciel (Flying Flea).

The Pouchel Light features a cantilever rear wing with a strut-braced parasol front wing, a single-seat open cockpit without a windshield, fixed conventional landing gear and a single engine in tractor configuration. The aircraft is made from bolted-together aluminium tubing. The wings are the same as those used on the Scoutchel and are built around a single aluminium spar, with ribs made from extruded polystyrene with plywood bracing, all bonded to fibreglass leading and trailing edges, covered in Dacron sailcloth. Its 6 m (20 ft) span front wing and 4 m (13 ft) span rear have a combined area of 12 m^{2} (129 sq ft) and both employ NACA 23112 airfoils. Recommended engines are the 35 hp (26 kW) Rotax 377 or the 40 hp (30 kW) Rotax 447 two-stroke powerplants.

== Specifications (Pouchel Light) ==
Data from Bayerl and APEV

General characteristics

- Crew: one
- Upper wingspan: 6 m (19 ft 8 in)
- Lower wingspan: 4 m (13 ft 1 in)
- Wing area: 12 m^{2} (130 sq ft)
- Airfoil: NACA 23112
- Empty weight: 100 kg (220 lb)
- Gross weight: 225 kg (496 lb)
- Fuel capacity: 30 litres (6.6 imp gal; 7.9 US gal)
- Powerplant: 1 × Rotax 377 twin cylinder, air-cooled, two stroke aircraft engine, 26 kW (35 hp)

Performance

- Cruise speed: 90 km/h (56 mph, 49 kn)
- Stall speed: 40 km/h (25 mph, 22 kn)
- Never exceed speed: 120 km/h (75 mph, 65 kn)
- g limits: +4/-2
- Rate of climb: 3 m/s (590 ft/min)
- Wing loading: 18.75 kg/m^{2} (3.84 lb/sq ft)
