= APEV Pouchel II =

French homebuilt aeroplane

Pouchel II
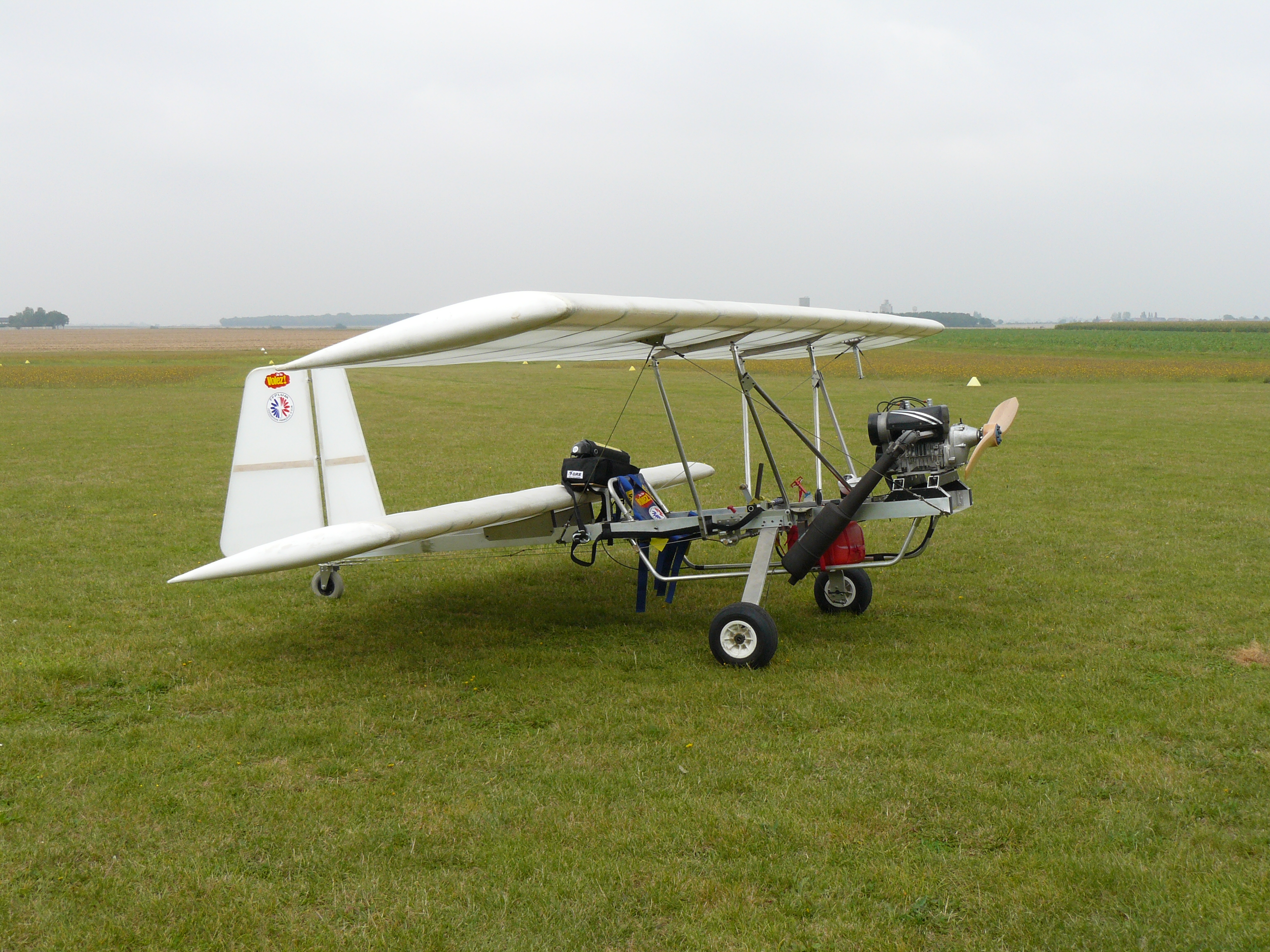
- Pouchel II

General information
- Type: Amateur-built aircraft
- National origin: France
- Manufacturer: APEV
- Designer: Daniel Dalby
- Status: Production completed

History
- Developed from: APEV Pouchel
- Variants: APEV Pouchel Classic; APEV Pouchel Light

The APEV Pouchel II (English: Ladder Flea Two) is a French amateur-built aircraft, designed by Daniel Dalby and produced by APEV of Peynier. The aircraft was supplied as plans or as a kit for amateur construction, but is no longer available. It has been replaced in production by the APEV Pouchel Light

== Design and development ==
The Pouchel II replaced the original APEV Pouchel in production. The original Pouchel was constructed using three commercially available aluminium ladders, hence APEV is the Association pour la Promotion des Echelles Volantes, or in English, Association for the Promotion of Flying Ladders. Later the ladder manufacturer grew concerned about liability and refused to supply any more ladders. The Pouchel was then re-designed to use aeronautical rectangular aluminium tubing in place of the original ladders and the new aircraft was designated the Pouchel II. The Pouchel series are all derivatives of the classic 1930s Henri Mignet-designed Mignet Pou-du-Ciel (Flying Flea).

The Pouchel II features a cantilever rear wing with a strut-braced parasol front wing, a single-seat open cockpit without a windshield, fixed conventional landing gear and a single engine in tractor configuration. The aircraft is made from bolted-together aluminium tubing, with its flying surfaces covered in Dacron sailcloth. Its 6 m (19.7 ft) span front wing and 4 m (13.1 ft) span rear have a combined area of 12 m^{2} (130 sq ft) and both employ NACA 23112 airfoils. The prototype used a 40 hp (30 kW) Rotax 447 two-stroke powerplant, but the 35 hp (26 kW) Rotax 377 is also recommended. The 28 hp (21 kW) Hirth F-33 has also been fitted.

== Specifications (Pouchel II) ==
Data from Bertrand and APEV

General characteristics

- Crew: one
- Upper wingspan: 6 m (19 ft 8 in)
- Lower wingspan: 4 m (13 ft 1 in)
- Wing area: 12 m^{2} (130 sq ft)
- Airfoil: NACA 23112
- Empty weight: 150 kg (331 lb)
- Gross weight: 275 kg (606 lb)
- Fuel capacity: 12 litres (2.6 imp gal; 3.2 US gal)
- Powerplant: 1 × Hirth F-33 single cylinder, air-cooled, two stroke aircraft engine, 21 kW (28 hp)
- Propellers: 2-bladed wooden

Performance

- Cruise speed: 90 km/h (56 mph, 49 kn)
- Stall speed: 40 km/h (25 mph, 22 kn)
- Never exceed speed: 120 km/h (75 mph, 65 kn)
- g limits: +4/-2
- Rate of climb: 2.5 m/s (490 ft/min)
- Wing loading: 18.75 kg/m^{2} (3.84 lb/sq ft)
