= APEV Pouchel Classic =

French homebuilt aeroplane

Pouchel Classic

General information
- Type: Amateur-built aircraft
- National origin: France
- Manufacturer: APEV
- Designer: Daniel Dalby
- Status: In production (2012)

History
- Developed from: Dalby Pouchel

The APEV Pouchel Classic (English: Ladder Flea Classic) is a French amateur-built aircraft, designed by Daniel Dalby and produced by APEV of Peynier. The aircraft is supplied as plans or as a kit for amateur construction.

== Design and development ==
The Pouchel Classic is derived from the APEV Pouchel, which is itself a derivative of the classic 1930s Henri Mignet-designed Mignet Pou-du-Ciel (Flying Flea). The design features a cantilever rear wing and a strut-braced front parasol wing, a single-seat open cockpit, fixed conventional landing gear and a single engine in tractor configuration.

The Pouchel Classic differs from the earlier Pouchel in that it has a newly designed wooden fuselage to replace the aluminium ladder and rectangular tube design of the Pouchel and the Pouchel II. The Pouchel Classic's fuselage is also longer. Its 6 m (19.7 ft) span front wing and 4 m (13.1 ft) span rear wing have a combined area of 12 m^{2} (130 sq ft) and employ NACA 23112 airfoils. Flying surfaces are covered in Dacron sailcloth. Standard engines recommended are the 35 hp (26 kW) Rotax 377 or the 40 hp (30 kW) Rotax 447 two-stroke powerplants.

== Specifications (Pouchel Classic) ==
Data from Bayerl and APEV

General characteristics

- Crew: one
- Upper wingspan: 6 m (19 ft 8 in)
- Lower wingspan: 4 m (13 ft 1 in)
- Wing area: 12 m^{2} (130 sq ft) total
- Airfoil: NACA 23112
- Empty weight: 150 kg (331 lb)
- Gross weight: 250 kg (551 lb)
- Fuel capacity: 30 litres (6.6 imp gal; 7.9 US gal)
- Powerplant: 1 × Rotax 447 two cylinder, air-cooled, two stroke aircraft engine, 30 kW (40 hp)

Performance

- Cruise speed: 90 km/h (56 mph, 49 kn)
- Stall speed: 40 km/h (25 mph, 22 kn)
- Never exceed speed: 120 km/h (75 mph, 65 kn)
- g limits: +4/-2
- Rate of climb: 3 m/s (590 ft/min)
- Wing loading: 20.8 kg/m^{2} (4.3 lb/sq ft)
