= Briffaud GB-10 Pou-Push =

GB-10 Pou-Push

General information
- Type: Single seat tandem wing
- National origin: France
- Designer: Georges Briffaud
- Number built: 1

History
- First flight: 23 June 1983

The Briffaud GB-10 Pou-Push was a Mignet style tandem wing single seat aircraft with a pusher configuration single engine. The sole example was built in France in the 1980s.

== Design and development ==
The Pou-Push was, as its name suggests, in the tandem wing tradition begun in France before World War II by the Mignet Pou-du-Ciel, with the larger, leading wing mounted above the cabin and higher than the rear one. It differed from most Pou inspired designs in having a pusher configuration engine mounted at the extreme aft of the aircraft over the trailing edge of the rear wing, which required the replacement of the conventionally central fin and rudder by vertical surfaces at the rear wing tips.

The forward wing was divided into two half spans so that their angles of incidence could be altered together to control pitch or independently for roll. The semi-spans were built around main box spars with spruce spar caps and plywood webs. Forward of the spar the wings were ply skinned, forming a D-shaped torsion box. Ribs were built from spruce trellis work. There was a secondary spar behind the main one and an over-all fabric covering. A trim tab was positioned inboard on the trailing edge of each half-span. The rear wing was similarly constructed but fixed in place. A long trailing edge flap could be raised, but not lowered, to steepen descents. The tips carried triangular endplate fins fitted with horn balanced rudders, spring centred and only opening outwards. These vertical tails were wooden structures with fabric covering.

The core of the Pou-Push's fuselage was all wood, with spruce frames and longerons covered in okoumé ply. Composite materials were used for the upper decking and nosecone; the ventral surface was fabric covered. The single seat placed the pilot under the forward wing leading edge, covered by a one-piece removable canopy. An ungeared 22 kW (30 hp) Hirth 276R inline two-stroke engine on top of the rear wing drove a fixed pitch wooden pusher propeller just beyond the trailing edge. The Pou-Push had a fixed tricycle undercarriage with its mainwheels on wire braced, single piece, composite arched legs. The nosewheel was steerable and fitted with brakes.

M. Desmots took the Pou-Push on its first flight on 23 June 1983. Later the designer's son, Michel Briffaud did the test flying and by the start of 1984 the aircraft had accumulated four flying hours in twelve flights.

== Specifications ==
Data from Jane's All the World's Aircraft 1984/85

General characteristics

- Crew: One
- Length: 4.37 m (14 ft 4 in)
- Upper wingspan: 7.20 m (23 ft 7 in) front wing
- Lower wingspan: 5.50 m (18 ft 1 in) rear wing
- Height: 1.52 m (5 ft 0 in) 13.52
- Wing area: 13.75 m^{2} (148.0 sq ft)
- Airfoil: NACA 25000
- Empty weight: 175 kg (386 lb)
- Max takeoff weight: 285 kg (628 lb)
- Fuel capacity: 38 L (8.4 Imp gal; 10.0 US gal)
- Powerplant: 1 × Hirth 276R air-cooled two cylinder inline two stroke
- Propellers: 2-bladed wooden, fixed pitch, 0.90 m (2 ft 11 in) diameter

Performance

- Cruise speed: 110 km/h (68 mph, 59 kn)
- Stall speed: 55 km/h (34 mph, 30 kn)
- Range: 400 km (250 mi, 220 nmi) with maximum fuel
- Rate of climb: 2.3 m/s (450 ft/min) at sea level with 77 kg (170 lb) pilot
