= APEV Pouchelec =

French homebuilt aircraft

Pouchelec
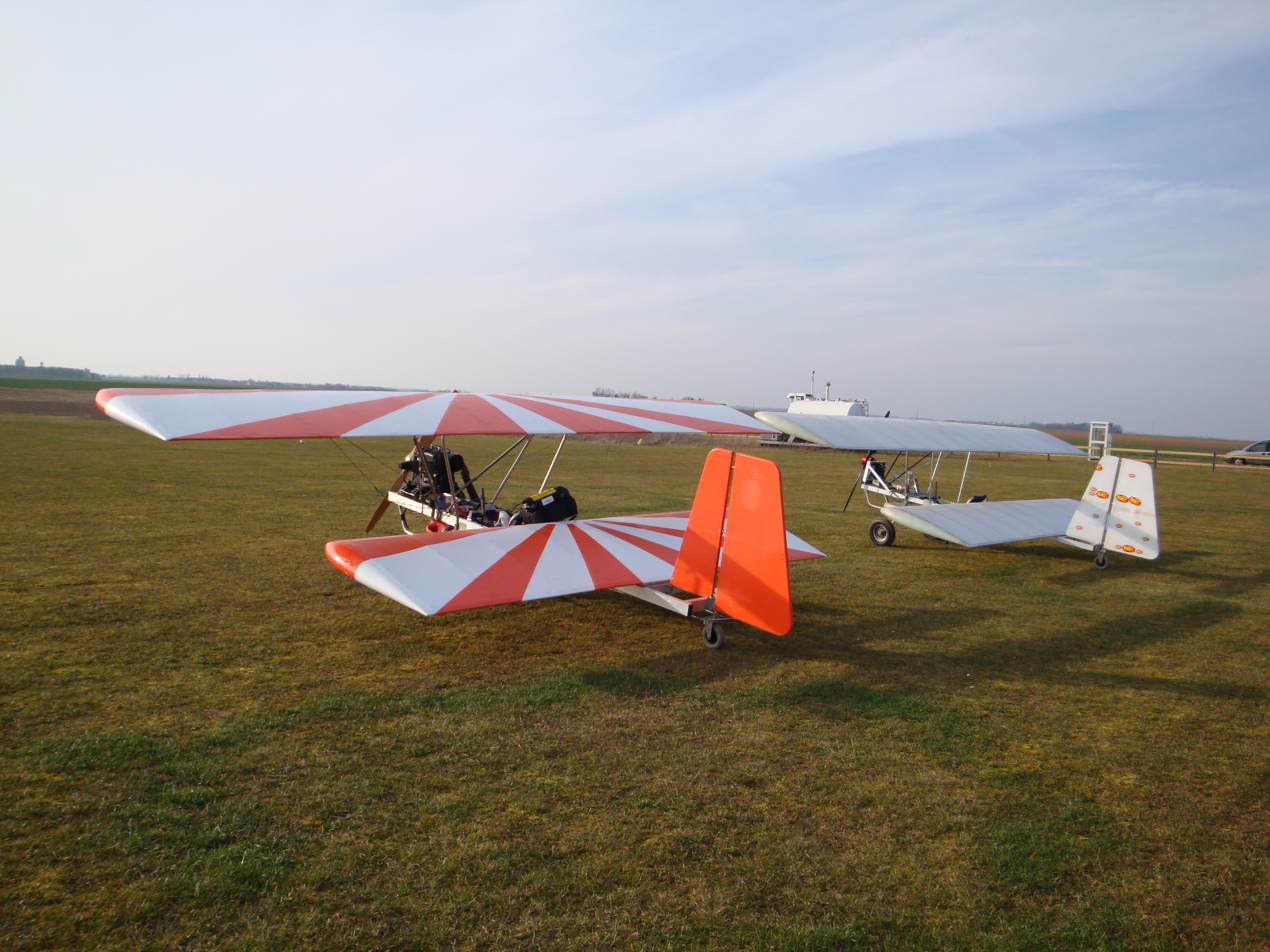
- A gasoline powered Pouchel (foreground) and a Pouchelec (background)

General information
- Type: Amateur-built electric aircraft
- National origin: France
- Manufacturer: APEV
- Designer: Daniel Dalby
- Status: Plans and kits no longer available (2017)

History
- Developed from: APEV Pouchel Light

The APEV Pouchelec (English: Ladder Flea Electric) is a French amateur-built electric aircraft, that was designed by Daniel Dalby and produced by APEV of Peynier. When it was available the aircraft was supplied as plans or as a kit for amateur construction.

== Design and development ==
The Pouchelec is a development of the APEV Pouchel Light, adapted for electric power, including revised landing gear and longer span wings with greater surface area. The original Pouchel was constructed using three commercially available aluminium ladders, hence APEV is the Association pour la Promotion des Echelles Volantes, or in English, Association for the Promotion of Flying Ladders. Later models were forced to move to rectangular aluminium tubing when the ladder manufacturer grew concerned about liability. The Pouchel series are all derivatives of the classic 1930s Henri Mignet-designed Mignet Pou-du-Ciel (Flying Flea).

The Pouchelec features a cantilever rear wing with a strut-braced parasol front wing, a single-seat open cockpit without a windshield, fixed conventional landing gear and a single engine in tractor configuration. The aircraft is made from bolted-together aluminium tubing, with its flying surfaces covered in Dacron sailcloth. Its 7.30 m (24.0 ft) span front wing and 5.30 m (17.4 ft) span rear have a combined area of 14.6 m^{2} (157 sq ft) and both employ NACA 23112 airfoils. The engine supplied is a 15 kW (20 hp) AGNI 119R electric motor powered by a Kokam Lithium-ion polymer battery pack, which gives a 30-minute flight endurance.

As of late 2017 it was no longer listed as available as plans or a kit.

== Operational history ==
Bayerl et al. describe the aircraft in flight as "wonderfully quiet".

== Specifications (Pouchelec) ==
Data from Bayerl and APEV

General characteristics

- Crew: one
- Upper wingspan: 7.30 m (23 ft 11 in)
- Lower wingspan: 5.30 m (17 ft 5 in)
- Wing area: 14.6 m^{2} (157 sq ft)
- Airfoil: NACA 23112
- Empty weight: 140 kg (309 lb) including batteries
- Gross weight: 250 kg (551 lb)
- Powerplant: 1 × AGNI 119R electric motor powered by a Kokam Lithium-ion polymer battery pack, 15 kW (20 hp)

Performance

- Maximum speed: 120 km/h (75 mph, 65 kn)
- Cruise speed: 70 km/h (43 mph, 38 kn)
- Stall speed: 35 km/h (22 mph, 19 kn)
- Never exceed speed: 120 km/h (75 mph, 65 kn)
- Endurance: 30 minutes
- g limits: +4/-2
- Wing loading: 17.1 kg/m^{2} (3.5 lb/sq ft)
