= Landray GL.01 =

Small tandem-wing sport aircraft

General information
- Type: Two seat tandem-wing homebuilt aircraft
- National origin: France
- Designer: Gilbert Landray
- Number built: 1

History
- First flight: August 1976

The Landray GL.01 is a small tandem-wing, side-by-side seat sport aircraft of the Mignet Pou-du-Ciel type. Built in the mid 1970s, the single example remains active.

== Design and development ==
In the later 1970s Gilbert Landray began to build the first of a series of tandem-wing light aircraft in the Mignet Pou-du-Ciel tradition and closest to the Croses Criquet in implementation. Like the Criquet the GL.01 is a two-seat tractor configuration aircraft with side-by-side seating.

The forward wing of the GL.01 is a one piece structure, mounted so that its angle of incidence can be varied from 2° to 14° by the pilot. The wing is held above the fuselage on two tall and slightly diverging faired struts, with pivots at their tops. Two further pivots are placed at the ends of lighter struts further out on the wing. Two vertical links from the cockpit to the rear of the wing are connected to the control column. The fixed rear wing is fabric covered and fitted with two metal flaps. Yaw stability and control are provided by a small fin and large, deep, balanced rudder, both entirely wooden and angular. Unusually, the rudder balance surface is below the fuselage.

The GL.01 has a wooden fuselage with seats enclosed under a perspex canopy. It is powered by a 67 kW (90 hp) Continental C90-8F flat four engine, driving a two blade propeller. It has a fixed tailwheel undercarriage, with spatted main wheels on arched, glass fibre, cantilever legs and a tailwheel semi-recessed into the bottom of the rudder.

The GL.01 made its first flight in August 1976. It remains on the French civil aircraft register in 2014, having been based at Marennes since 2003.

== Specifications ==
Data from Jane's All the World's Aircraft 1981, p.487

General characteristics

- Capacity: Two
- Length: 5.00 m (16 ft 5 in)
- Upper wingspan: 7.40 m (24 ft 3 in) (front wing)
- Lower wingspan: 6.70 m (22 ft 0 in) (rear wing)
- Height: 2.10 m (6 ft 11 in)
- Wing area: 15.50 m^{2} (166.8 sq ft)
- Airfoil: NACA 23012
- Empty weight: 361 kg (796 lb)
- Max takeoff weight: 625 kg (1,378 lb)
- Fuel capacity: 80 L (18 imp gal; 21 US gal)
- Powerplant: 1 × Continental C90-8F flat four, 67 kW (90 hp)
- Propellers: 2-bladed

Performance

- Maximum speed: 220 km/h (140 mph, 120 kn)
- Cruise speed: 180 km/h (110 mph, 97 kn)
- Range: 700 km (430 mi, 380 nmi)
- Take-off run: 90 m (300 ft)
- Landing speed: 80 km/h (50 mph; 43 kn)
- Landing distance: 60 m (200 ft)
