= APEV Scoutchel =

French homebuilt aeroplane

Scoutchel

General information
- Type: Amateur-built aircraft
- National origin: France
- Manufacturer: APEV
- Designer: Daniel Dalby
- Status: In production (2012)

History
- Developed from: APEV Demoichelle

The APEV Scoutchel (English: Scout ladder) is a French amateur-built aircraft, designed by Daniel Dalby and produced by APEV of Peynier. The aircraft is supplied as plans or as a kit for amateur construction.

== Design and development ==
The Scoutchel is derived from the earlier APEV Demoichelle, itself an updated version of the pre-First World War Santos-Dumont Demoiselle.

The Scoutchel features a strut-braced high-wing, a single-seat open cockpit without a cockpit fairing, fixed tricycle landing gear and a single engine mounted above the cockpit on the keel tube, in tractor configuration.

The aircraft is made from bolted-together aluminium tubing. The wings are the same as those used on the Pouchel Light and are built around a single aluminium spar, with ribs made from extruded polystyrene with plywood bracing, all bonded to fibreglass leading and trailing edges, covered in Dacron sailcloth. The 8.30 m (27.2 ft) span wing employs a NACA 23112 airfoil and has an area of 9.96 m^{2} (107.2 sq ft), with an aspect ratio of 8:1. A unique roll control system is used as the aircraft has no ailerons. Instead the wings are pivoted to +4° and -2° to produce and control roll. The wings can be folded for ground transportation or storage.

Recommended engines are the 35 hp (26 kW) Rotax 377 or the 40 hp (30 kW) Rotax 447 two-stroke powerplants, although it can also fit electric motors as well.

The manufacturer estimates building times at 150 hours from the kit and 300 hours from plans.

== Specifications (Scoutchel) ==
Data from Bayerl

General characteristics

- Crew: one
- Length: 5.2 m (17 ft 1 in)
- Wingspan: 8.30 m (27 ft 3 in)
- Height: 2.6 m (8 ft 6 in)
- Wing area: 9.96 m^{2} (107.2 sq ft)
- Aspect ratio: 8:1
- Airfoil: NACA 23112
- Empty weight: 130 kg (287 lb)
- Gross weight: 250 kg (551 lb)
- Powerplant: 1 × Rotax 912ULS four cylinder, liquid and air-cooled, four stroke aircraft engine, 75 kW (101 hp)

Performance

- Cruise speed: 100 km/h (62 mph, 54 kn)
- Stall speed: 40 km/h (25 mph, 22 kn)
- Never exceed speed: 120 km/h (75 mph, 65 kn)
- g limits: +4/-2
- Wing loading: 25.1 kg/m^{2} (5.1 lb/sq ft)
