= Universal American Flea Ship =

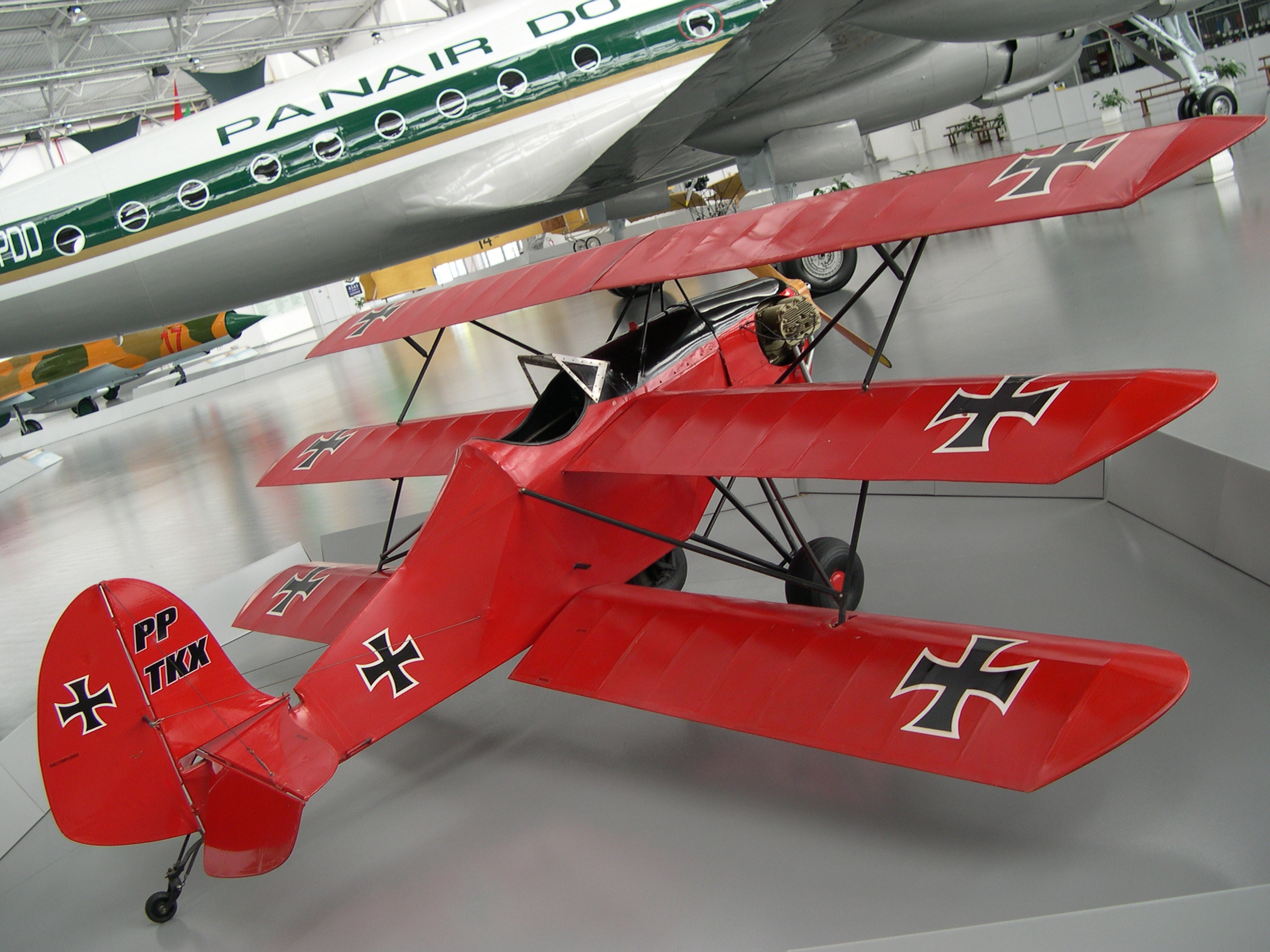
- Universal American Flea Ship

General information
- Type: Homebuilt aircraft
- National origin: United States of America
- Manufacturer: Universal Aircraft
- Designer: Henri Mignet, Lillian Holden.

History
- Introduction date: 1939
- Developed from: Mignet Pou-du-Ciel

The American Flea Ship (Flea Triplane) is a homebuilt triplane design of the early 1930s. It is one of the first examples of a female-designed-and-built aircraft. One example is displayed at the Museu Aeronáutico Paulista (MAPA), Campo de Marte Airport.

== Development ==
The American Flea Ship is a homebuilt triplane variant of the French-designed Mignet Flea licensed by American Mignet Aircraft, and later Universal Aircraft company of Ft Worth, Texas. It is also known as the Flea Triplane. The aircraft was given away by Universal as a marketing effort when a Universal motor was purchased to power it. Later, the fuselage sold for $695. The kit version of the aircraft was designed by Lillian Holden. Ace Aircraft Manufacturing Company maintains the rights to the American Flea Ship and Heath Parasol.

== Design ==
The Triplane aircraft does not have ailerons, and uses variable incidence wings for roll control.

== Variants ==
The aircraft has been referenced under many names including;

- American Flea Ship
- Mignet HM-20
- HM-20 Flying Flea
- Flea Triplane
- TC-1 Flea (1954)

== Specifications American Flea Ship ==
Data from Aerofiles

General characteristics

- Capacity: 1
- Wingspan: 20 ft (6.1 m)
- Empty weight: 460 lb (209 kg)
- Powerplant: 1 × Universal , 40 hp (30 kW) Later models used a 65hp Continental

Performance

- Maximum speed: 87 kn (100 mph, 160 km/h)
