= Croses BEC-7 Tous Terrains =

BEC-7

General information
- Type: recreational aircraft
- Manufacturer: homebuilt
- Designer: Emilien Croses
- Primary user: private pilot owners

History
- First flight: 1967
- Developed from: Croses EC-6 Criquet

The Croses BEC-7 is a 1960s French three-seat homebuilt aircraft designed by Emilien Croses.

== Development ==
The BEC-7 is a tandem-wing design of all-wood construction with canvas coating.

== Specifications (BEC-7 Tous Terrains) ==
Data from , Jane's all the World's Aircraft 1969–70

General characteristics

- Crew: 1
- Capacity: 2 pax
- Wingspan: 8.40 m (27 ft 7 in)
- Wing area: 22.00 m^{2} (236.8 sq ft)
- Empty weight: 420 kg (926 lb)
- Max takeoff weight: 750 kg (1,653 lb)
- Powerplant: 1 × Rolls-Royce Continental O-200 air-cooled horizontally-opposed piston engine, 75 kW (100 hp)
- Propellers: 2-bladed SIPA propeller

Performance

- Maximum speed: 220 km/h (140 mph, 120 kn) at sea level at 750 kg (1,650 lb)
- Cruise speed: 180 km/h (110 mph, 97 kn) at sea level
- Minimum speed: 70 km/h (43 mph; 38 kn)
- Rate of climb: 6 m/s (1,200 ft/min)
- Take-off run: 150 m (490 ft)
- Landing run: 60 m (200 ft) (brakes on)
