= Croses Para-Cargo =

EC-9 Para-Cargo

General information
- Type: Cargo plane
- Manufacturer: homebuilt
- Designer: Emilien Croses
- Number built: at least 2

The Croses EC-9 Para-Cargo is a 1960s French six-seat tandem-wing cargo-carrying homebuilt aircraft designed by Emilien Croses.

== Design and development ==
Developed from the earlier two-seat EC-6 Criquet and three-seat EC-8 Tourisme, the Para-Cargo was a cargo-carrying aircraft with a tailwheel landing gear and a tandem wing similar to the Mignet Pou-du-Ciel family. It could carry up to six persons or 450 kg (990 lb) of freight and was intended especially for carrying skydivers: the aircraft was equipped with a large side door that hinged inward and upward to facilitate skydiver egress. Another door at the rear of the fuselage was provided to allow oversize loads to be carried. The Para-Cargo aircraft had Cosandey Flaps, rear wing mounted upward deflecting flaps that can be used independently to assist in roll control, or jointly as an elevator, that were often mistaken for ailerons . At least two examples (F-ACVC and F-PYBC) had been built by 1965.

== Specifications ==
General characteristics

- Crew: One pilot
- Capacity: 450 kg (990 lb) of freight or four skydivers or two stretchers with attendants
- Length: 7.50 m (24 ft 7 in)
- Wingspan: 9.60 m (31 ft 6 in)
- Empty weight: 650 kg (1,433 lb)
- Powerplant: 1 × Lycoming , 134 kW (180 hp)

Performance

- Cruise speed: 175 km/h (108 mph, 94 kn)
- Rate of climb: 4.0 m/s (800 ft/min)
