= Ultralight Engineering Astra =

American ultralight aircraft

Astra

General information
- Type: Ultralight aircraft
- National origin: United States
- Manufacturer: Ultralight Engineering
- Status: Production completed

History
- Developed from: Eipper Quicksilver

The Ultralight Engineering Astra (English: Star) is an American high-wing, tricycle landing gear, cable-braced, single-seat, open cockpit, single engine in pusher configuration, ultralight aircraft that was designed and produced by Ultralight Engineering in the 1980s. The aircraft was supplied as a kit for amateur construction.

== Design and development ==
The aircraft was designed to comply with the US FAR 103 Ultralight Vehicles rules, including the category's maximum empty weight of 254 lb (115 kg). The Astra's standard empty weight is 248 lb (112 kg). Like many ultralights of the early 1980s, it was derived from the Eipper Quicksilver and generally resembles that aircraft. The Astra primarily improved upon the Quicksilver in its main landing gear design, which is suspended by coil springs to reduce the chances of damage during rough landings.

The airframe is made from bolted-together aluminium tubing and covered in Dacron sailcloth. The 33 ft (10.1 m) span wing is braced by cables from a kingpost. The controls are three-axis, with roll controlled by three small spoilers mounted on each wing. The standard factory supplied engine was the Rotax 377 of 35 hp (26 kW) and it is mounted on the trailing edge of the wing, with the propeller in between the four tailboom tubes. The aircraft can be assembled or disassembled for storage or ground transportation by two people in fifteen minutes.

Ultralight Engineering went out of business after the fatal crash of a prototype of another design and production of the Astra ended at the same time.

== Specifications (Astra) ==
Data from Cliche

General characteristics

- Crew: one
- Wingspan: 33 ft 0 in (10.06 m)
- Wing area: 165 sq ft (15.3 m^{2})
- Empty weight: 248 lb (112 kg)
- Gross weight: 550 lb (249 kg)
- Fuel capacity: 4 U.S. gallons (15 L; 3.3 imp gal)
- Powerplant: 1 × Rotax 377 , 35 hp (26 kW)

Performance

- Maximum speed: 55 mph (89 km/h, 48 kn)
- Cruise speed: 45 mph (72 km/h, 39 kn)
- Stall speed: 22 mph (35 km/h, 19 kn)
- Rate of climb: 800 ft/min (4.1 m/s)
- Wing loading: 3.33 lb/sq ft (16.3 kg/m^{2})
