= Landray GL.02 =

GL.02 Ami Pou

General information
- Type: Sports aircraft
- National origin: France
- Designer: Gilbert Landray
- Number built: 1

History
- First flight: 27 October 1978

The Landray GL.02 Ami Pou was a very basic, low-powered French tandem wing, single-seat sports aircraft. The only example flew in 1979.

== Design and development ==
The GL.02 Pou Ami was a very simple, small, low-powered tandem wing aircraft in the Mignet Pou-du-Ciel style. This was reflected in its name, which also referred to the source of its engine, the Citroën Ami 8 car. Its rear wing, a little shorter in span than the forward, upper one, was mounted on top of the rear fuselage. In common with other Pou-type designs, the GL.02 was controlled by changing the incidence of the forward wing. To do this, this wing was mounted high over the fuselage on four co-linear pivot points. Two struts from the upper fuselage longerons rose almost vertically to the inner pivot points and two more, also from those longerons, leaned out to the second pair. The incidence was altered by two links from the control column to the rear of the wing.

The fuselage of the Pou Ami was a simple, flat-sided structure. Its engine, a modified 20 kW (27 hp) modified Citroen Ami 8 motorcar air-cooled flat-twin engine was mounted low in the nose, with its cylinders exposed for cooling. This retained the standard clutch as a torque damper and, because its maximum power was developed around 5,500 r.p.m., was geared down with six intermediate belt drives. As a result, the propeller driveshaft was noticeably higher in the nose than the engine, enclosed under a curved decking that extended back to the open cockpit between the two wings. The small cropped triangular fin began at the rear wing's trailing edge and carried a generous, tall, near-rectangular balanced rudder that extended to the keel. The Pou Ami had a tailwheel undercarriage, with mainwheels on sprung, light alloy cantilever legs.

The Pou Ami flew for the first time on 27 October 1978 and gained its Certificate of Airworthiness on 23 July 1979. This was not renewed the following year and the Pou Ami was dismantled.

== Specifications ==
Data from Jane's All the World's Aircraft 1981-82

General characteristics

- Crew: one
- Upper wingspan: 6.40 m (21 ft 0 in)
- Lower wingspan: 5.40 m (17 ft 9 in)
- Wing area: 12.0 m^{2} (129 sq ft) , both wings together
- Empty weight: 180 kg (397 lb)
- Max takeoff weight: 295 kg (650 lb)
- Powerplant: 1 × converted Citroen Ami 8 car engine, an air-cooled flat twin, 20 kW (27 hp) with a six belt speed reducer
- Propellers: 2-bladed, 1.50 m (4 ft 11 in) diameter

Performance

- Maximum speed: 130 km/h (81 mph, 70 kn)
- Minimum control speed: 40 km/h (25 mph, 22 kn)
