= Bagalini Bagalini =

Italian ultralight aircraft

Bagalini

General information
- Type: Homebuilt ultralight aircraft
- National origin: Italy
- Designer: Marino Bagalini
- Status: Plans available (1998)

The Bagalini Bagalini is an Italian homebuilt ultralight aircraft that was designed by Marino Bagalini. The aircraft is supplied in the form of plans for amateur construction.

== Design and development ==
The Bagalini was designed to comply with the US FAR 103 Ultralight Vehicles rules, including the category's maximum empty weight of 254 lb (115 kg). The aircraft has a standard empty weight of 254 lb (115 kg).

The aircraft features a strut-braced parasol wing, a single-seat open cockpit without a windshield, fixed tricycle landing gear and a single engine in pusher configuration.

The Bagalini's fuselage is made from wood and metal, while the wings are a wooden frame covered in doped aircraft fabric. The rear fuselage consists of two tubes, one above and one below the pusher engine. Its 10.7 m (35.1 ft) span wing employs a modified NACA 63-215 airfoil at the wing root transitioning to a NACA 4412 at the wing tips. The wing has an area of 14.2 m^{2} (153 sq ft) and is supported by "V" struts. The acceptable power range is 35 to 40 hp (26 to 30 kW) and the standard engines used are the 35 hp (26 kW) Rotax 377 and the 40 hp (30 kW) Rotax 447 two-stroke powerplants.

The aircraft has an empty weight of 115 kg (254 lb) and a gross weight of 200 kg (440 lb), giving a useful load of 89 kg (196 lb). With full fuel of 11 litres (2.4 imp gal; 2.9 US gal) the payload is 81 kg (179 lb).

The manufacturer estimates the construction time from the supplied plans as 700 hours.

== Specifications (Bagalini) ==
Data from AeroCrafter and The Incomplete Guide to Airfoil Usage

General characteristics

- Crew: one
- Length: 6.40 m (21 ft 0 in)
- Wingspan: 10.67 m (35 ft 0 in)
- Wing area: 14.2 m^{2} (153 sq ft)
- Airfoil: Root: modified NACA 63-215; Tip: NACA 4412
- Empty weight: 115 kg (254 lb)
- Gross weight: 204 kg (450 lb)
- Fuel capacity: 11 litres (2.4 imp gal; 2.9 US gal)
- Powerplant: 1 × Rotax 447 twin cylinder, air-cooled, two stroke aircraft engine, 30 kW (40 hp)
- Propellers: 2-bladed composite

Performance

- Maximum speed: 97 km/h (60 mph, 52 kn)
- Cruise speed: 64 km/h (40 mph, 35 kn)
- Stall speed: 43 km/h (27 mph, 23 kn)
- Range: 160 km (100 mi, 87 nmi)
- g limits: +7/-3.5
- Rate of climb: 6.1 m/s (1,200 ft/min)
- Wing loading: 14 kg/m^{2} (2.9 lb/sq ft)
