= Airdrome Dream Fantasy Twin =

American ultralight airplane

General information
- Type: Amateur-built aircraft and ultralight trainer
- National origin: United States
- Manufacturer: Airdrome Aeroplanes
- Status: In production (2011)
- Number built: 4 (2011)

History
- Developed from: Airdrome Dream Classic

The Airdrome Dream Fantasy Twin is an American ultralight trainer and amateur-built aircraft, designed and produced by Airdrome Aeroplanes, of Holden, Missouri. The aircraft was derived from the single seat Airdrome Dream Classic and is supplied as a kit for amateur construction.

== Design and development ==
The Airdrome Dream Fantasy Twin features a cable-braced biplane layout, a two-seats-in-side-by-side configuration open cockpit, fixed conventional landing gear and a single engine in tractor configuration mounted above the cockpit on the keel tube.

The aircraft is made from bolted-together aluminum tubing, with its flying surfaces covered in doped aircraft fabric. The Airdrome Dream Fantasy Twin has a wingspan of 30 ft (9.1 m) and a wing area of 150 sq ft (14 m^{2}). It can be equipped with engines ranging from 35 to 65 hp (26 to 48 kW). The standard engine used is the 50 hp (37 kW) two stroke Rotax 503, with 64 hp (48 kW) Rotax 582, 40 hp (30 kW) Rotax 447, 35 hp (26 kW) Rotax 377 or a 60 hp (45 kW) Volkswagen air-cooled engine optional. Building time from the factory-supplied kit is estimated at 200 hours by the manufacturer.

== Operational history ==
Four examples had been completed by December 2011.

== Specifications (Dream Fantasy Twin) ==
Data from Kitplanes and Airdrome Aeroplanes

General characteristics

- Crew: one
- Capacity: one passenger
- Length: 15 ft (4.6 m)
- Wingspan: 30 ft (9.1 m)
- Wing area: 150 sq ft (14 m^{2})
- Empty weight: 312 lb (142 kg)
- Gross weight: 630 lb (286 kg)
- Fuel capacity: 5 U.S. gallons (19 L; 4.2 imp gal)
- Powerplant: 1 × Rotax 377 twin cylinder, air-cooled, two stroke radial engine, 35 hp (26 kW)
- Propellers: 2-bladed wooden

Performance

- Cruise speed: 45 mph (72 km/h, 39 kn)
- Stall speed: 27 mph (43 km/h, 23 kn)
- Range: 79 mi (127 km, 69 nmi)
- Rate of climb: 550 ft/min (2.8 m/s)
- Wing loading: 4.2 lb/sq ft (21 kg/m^{2})
