= Rotax 377 =

Austrian two-stroke aircraft engine

377
- Type: Piston aero-engine
- National origin: Austria
- Manufacturer: Rotax
- Major applications: Ultralight aircraft

The Rotax 377 is a 35 hp (26 kW), twin-cylinder, two-stroke aircraft engine, that was built by BRP-Rotax GmbH & Co. KG of Austria for use in ultralight aircraft.

== Development ==
The Rotax 377 features piston-ported, air-cooled cylinder heads and cylinders, utilizing either a fan or free air for cooling. Lubrication is by use of pre-mixed fuel and oil. The 377 has a single Bosch Flywheel Magneto Generator 12 volt ignition system and is equipped with a 36 mm Bing double float carburetor, with either a hand lever or cable choke.

The Rotax 377 is no longer in production.

== Applications ==
- Advanced Aeromarine Buccaneer XA
- Aerodyne Systems Vector
- Airdrome Dream Fantasy Twin
- Airdrome Fokker D-VIII
- APEV Pouchel II
- APEV Pouchel Classic
- APEV Pouchel Light
- APEV Scoutchel
- Bagalini Bagalini
- Birdman Chinook WT-11
- Canaero Toucan
- Dalby Pouchel
- Quicksilver MX
- Hummel CA-2
- Loehle Spad XIII
- Rotec Rally
- Sirocco 377GB
- Sorrell Guppy
- Spectrum Beaver RX-35
- Star Flight TX-1000
- Ultralight Engineering Astra

== Specifications (377) ==
Data from ROTAX 377 UL Data Sheet

=== General characteristics ===
- Type: two-stroke air-cooled aeroengine
- Bore: 62 mm (2.44 in)
- Stroke: 61 mm (2.40 in)
- Displacement: 368.3 cc (22.48 cu in)
- Dry weight: 38.4 kg (84.6 lb) (complete including reduction drive and exhaust system)

=== Components ===
- Valvetrain: piston ports
- Fuel system: pneumatic pump pressurized
- Fuel type: premium unleaded autofuel
- Oil system: premixed in the fuel at 50:1
- Cooling system: fan or free air

=== Performance ===
- Power output: 26 kW (35 hp) at 6500 rpm
- Power-to-weight ratio: 0.67 kW/kg (0.41 hp/lb)

== See also ==
- Arrow 250
- JPX PUL 425
- Kawasaki 440
