= Lederlin 380L =

380L Ladybug
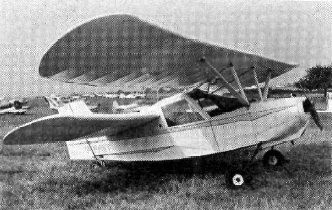
- Lederlin 380L (F-PMET) at Laval aerodrome, 15 August 1969

General information
- Type: Sport aircraft
- National origin: France
- Manufacturer: Homebuilt
- Designer: François Lederlin

History
- First flight: 14 September 1965

The Lederlin 380L (marketed in North America as the Ladybug) is an unconventional light aircraft developed in France in the 1960s, and marketed for homebuilding.

== Development ==
François Lederlin developed the 380L from the Mignet HM.380 "Flying Flea", and eventually created a new aircraft sharing only its choice of wing profile and general configuration.

Like the Pou-du-Ciel, the 380L is a tandem wing design, with the forward wing mounted on a set of cabane struts forward of the cockpit, and designed to pivot in flight, to vary its angle of incidence. Otherwise, it is unlike the original Mignet HM.14, having side-by-side seating for two in a fully enclosed cockpit, and a neatly cowled engine. The fuselage is of steel tube construction, metal-skinned at the front and fabric-covered to the rear, and the wings have fabric-covered wooden structure. The tailwheel undercarriage is fixed.

== Specifications ==
Data from Jane's all the world's aircraft, 1975-76

General characteristics

- Crew: 2
- Length: 4.77 m (15 ft 8 in)
- Wingspan: 7.92 m (26 ft 0 in)
- Height: 2.08 m (6 ft 10 in)
- Wing area: 9.92 m^{2} (106.8 sq ft) forward wing; 7.43 m^{2} (80.0 sq ft)
- Airfoil: 3-40-13
- Empty weight: 360 kg (794 lb)
- Max takeoff weight: 600 kg (1,323 lb)
- Fuel capacity: 85 L (22 US gal; 19 imp gal) in a single fuel tank
- Powerplant: 1 × Continental C90-14F 4-cyl. air-cooled horizontally-opposed piston engine, 67 kW (90 hp)
- Propellers: 2-bladed McCauley fixed pitch metal propeller, 1.83 m (6 ft 0 in) diameter

Performance

- Maximum speed: 201 km/h (125 mph, 109 kn) at 300 m (980 ft)
- Cruise speed: 161 km/h (100 mph, 87 kn) at 600 m (2,000 ft)
- Stall speed: 49 km/h (30 mph, 26 kn) power off
- Never exceed speed: 233 km/h (145 mph, 126 kn)
- Range: 855 km (531 mi, 462 nmi)
- Service ceiling: 3,660 m (12,010 ft) +
- Wing loading: 34 kg/m^{2} (7.0 lb/sq ft)
- Power/mass: 0.111 kW/kg (0.0675 hp/lb)
