= Croses Tourisme =

EC-8 Tourisme

General information
- Type: three-seat tandem-wing homebuilt
- Designer: Emilien Croses

The Croses EC-8 Tourisme is a 1960s French three-seat tandem-wing homebuilt aircraft designed by Emilien Croses.

== Development ==
Developed from the earlier two-seat EC-6 Criquet the Tourisme was a three-seat version. Like the Criquet it had a tailwheel landing gear and Mignet-type tandem wing. To equip it for cross-country flying, the EC-8 was fitted with sturdier undercarriage than its predecessor, which consisted of an unusual tandem arrangement of two wheels on each main undercarriage unit.
