= Croses Criquet =

EC-6 Criquet
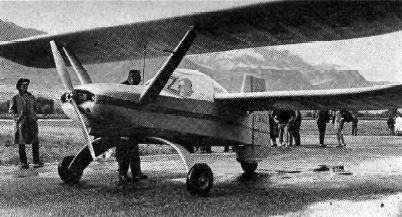
- Croses EC-6 Criquet (F-WNGA)

General information
- Type: recreational aircraft
- Manufacturer: homebuilt
- Designer: Emilien Croses
- Primary user: private pilot owners

History
- First flight: 6 July 1965

The Croses EC-6 Criquet ("Locust") is a 1960s French two-seat homebuilt aircraft designed by Emilien Croses.

== Development ==
The EC-6 Criquet is a design for a homebuilt aircraft with a tailwheel landing gear, and tandem wing configuration similar to the Mignet Pou-du-Ciel family. It has two side-by-side seats. It first flew in 1965, and seven examples had flown by 1977, with more than 60 known to be under construction.

The EC-6 Criquet Léger (Mini Criquet) is an ultralight variant.

The LC-6 Criquet is an improved version developed by Gilbert Landray.

The LC-10 Criquet was developed by a Mr Millet of Société Co-Plasud who used fibreglass construction throughout the entire aircraft. It was used as a trainer by the Aéro-Club du Maconnais. While considerably more expensive to build than a conventional wooden Criquet, the fibreglass version was also 80 kg (180 lb) heavier.

== Operational history ==
As well as being used for local flying, the Criquet has been flown to both national and international light aircraft rallies. A French owned example visited the 1992 rally at RAF Wroughton airfield near Swindon, Wiltshire, England.

== Variants ==
EC-6 Criquet
(English:cricket) The original version designed by Emilien Croses.
EC-6 Criquet Léger
An ultralight version.
LC-6 Criquet
(LC - Landray-Coses) The EC-6 modified and improved by Gilbert Landray.
LC-10 Criquet
(LC - Laibie-Coses) An all fibre-glass version of the EC-6 built by M. Millet of Société Co-Plasud (president of the Aero-club de l'Aude). A second LC-10 was built by M. Barrière.

== Specifications (EC-6 no.01 Criquet) ==
Data from Jane's all the world's aircraft, 1975-76, Simpson (2001)

General characteristics

- Crew: 2
- Length: 4.65 m (15 ft 3 in) * Forward wing span: 7.8 m (26 ft)
- Rear wing span: 7 m (23 ft)
- Wing area: 16 m^{2} (170 sq ft)
- Aspect ratio: 6.5 (forward wing); 5.833 (rear wing)
- Airfoil: NACA 23012 modified
- Empty weight: 300 kg (661 lb)
- Gross weight: 550 kg (1,213 lb)
- Max takeoff weight: 550 kg (1,213 lb)
- Fuel capacity: 60 L (16 US gal; 13 imp gal)
- Powerplant: 1 × Continental C90 4-cyl. air-cooled horizontally-opposed piston engine, 67 kW (90 hp)
- Propellers: 2-bladed SIPA propeller

Performance

- Maximum speed: 213 km/h (132 mph, 115 kn)
- Cruise speed: 160 km/h (99 mph, 86 kn) * Minimum flying speed: (will not stall) 40 km/h (25 mph; 22 kn)
- Range: 480 km (300 mi, 260 nmi)
- Time to altitude: 6 minutes 14 seconds to 2,000 m (6,600 ft)

== See also ==
- Croses EC-1 Pouplume
- Croses EC-8 Tourisme
- Croses EC-9 Para-Cargo
- Lederlin 380L
