= Mignet Pou-du-Ciel =

French homebuilt aircraft

Flying Flea series
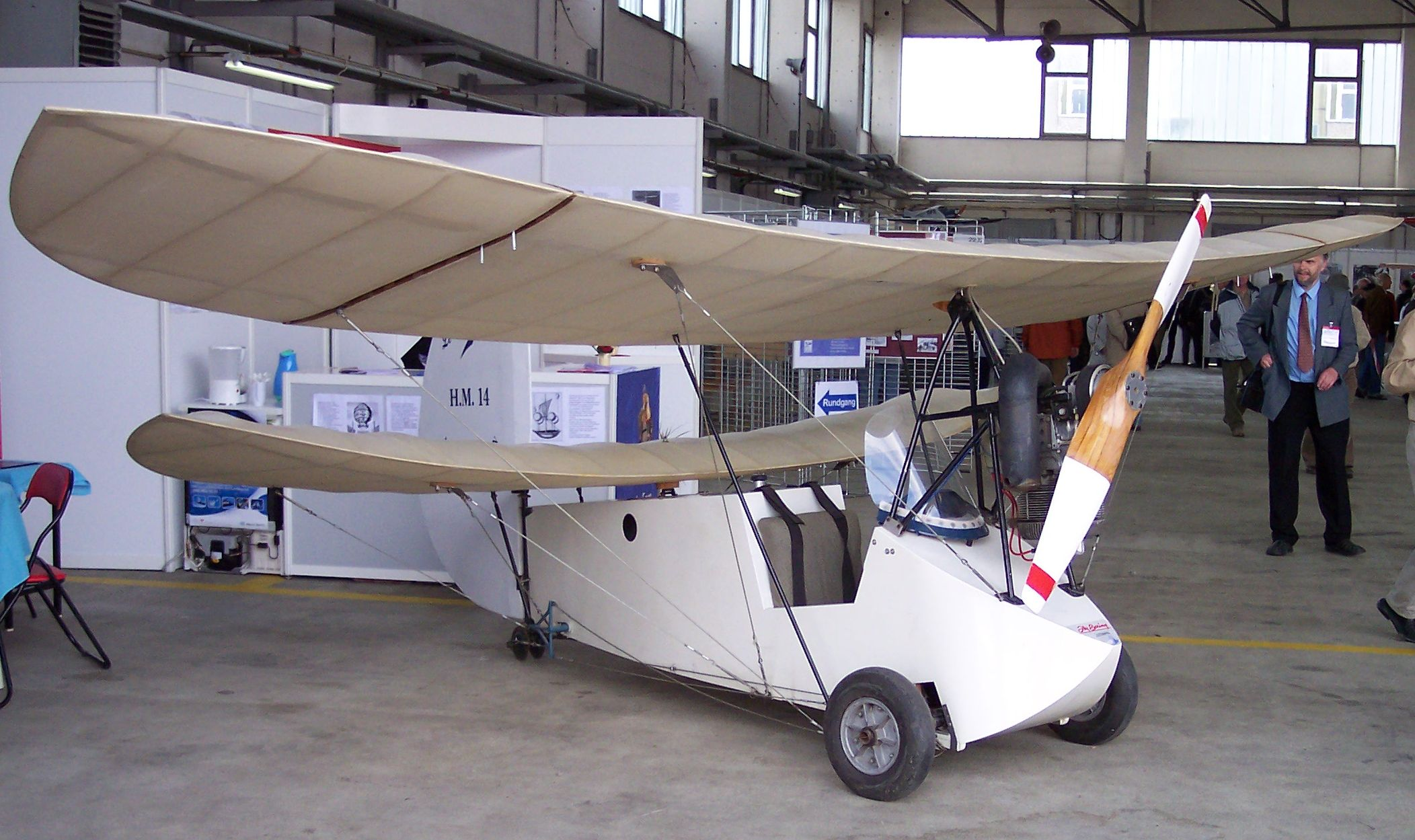
- Mignet HM.14

General information
- Type: Sport, personal and trainer aircraft
- Manufacturer: homebuilt aircraft
- Designer: Henri Mignet

History
- Manufactured: 1933–present
- Introduction date: 1933
- First flight: 10 September 1933 (HM.14)

The Flying Flea (French: Pou du Ciel, lit. 'Louse of the Sky') is a large family of light homebuilt aircraft first flown in 1933.

The odd name comes from the French nickname for the Ford Model T automobile: Pou de la Route, or "Louse of the Road", because Henry Ford's economy car was so common. Henri Mignet dreamed of creating a Model T of the air, an airplane for the common man, hence the term Pou du Ciel. In English, the term became Flying Flea. Originally applied only to the HM.14 model, the name has now come to describe the family of aircraft of similar configuration designed by Mignet and others.

== Development ==
The Flying Flea family of aircraft was designed by Frenchman Henri Mignet.

Between 1920 and 1928, Mignet built various prototypes from the HM.1 to the HM.8, a monoplane that was the first of his designs that really flew. Instructions for building the HM.8 Avionnette were published by Mignet in a self-published book—he hand wrote the text and drawings, created photographic plates and printed and bound the books himself—but Mignet was still not satisfied. In particular, he felt that he was not himself a very good pilot and did not like the challenge of coordinating the stick and rudder on a conventional aircraft. He yearned for a simpler solution. Between 1929 and 1933, he continued building prototypes, and testing them in a large field near Soissons. The result of this experimentation with many odd and innovative configurations was the HM.14.

== HM.14 ==
In 1933, Mignet successfully flew for the first time in his HM.14, the original flying flea, and publicly demonstrated it. In 1934, he published the plans and building instructions in his book Le Sport de l'Air. In 1935, it was translated into English in Britain and serialised in Practical Mechanics in the US, prompting hundreds of people around the world to build their own Flying Fleas.

Mignet's original HM.14 prototype aircraft was powered by a 17 hp (13 kW) Aubier-Dunne 500 cc two stroke motorcycle engine. It had a wingspan of 19.5 feet (5.9 m), a length of 11.5 feet (3.5 m) and a gross weight of 450 lb (204 kg). It had a usable speed range of 25–62 mph (40–100 km/h). In the UK in 1935 and 1936, many aerodynamic and engine developments took place, notably by Stephen Appleby, John Carden and L.E. Baynes.

Despite the initial popularity of the design, thanks in no small part to the passionate enthusiasm of Mignet himself, the original HM.14 revealed design flaws that could lead to an unrecoverable and often fatal dive under certain conditions; when the front wing was put in a high attack angle for climbing, the high-speed flow of air deflected by the front wing went to the rear wing upper surface, greatly increasing the rear wing's lift, and putting the nose down, the instinctive reaction of pilot being pulling even more the stick, this worsened the situation, as the way to go out of this 'vicious circle' was reducing the front wing incidence, as to command a nose down descent. Also some homebuilders attempted to simplify construction by modifying components such as the wings tips curving up, resulting in extremely dangerous airplanes and deadly accidents that forced the air authorities to ban building more of them. Studies in the UK and France revealed the problem (the HM.14 was small enough to fit in wind tunnels in both countries usually used for scale models of larger aircraft) and corrections were made to the design. Unfortunately, the wave of bad publicity created by the crashes dogged Mignet for the rest of his life and continues to be associated with the design today despite the fact that the basic Mignet configuration has proven to be safe in hundreds of successful homebuilt aircraft and factory built microlights.

== Design ==
Mignet made the aircraft intentionally simple. The Flying Flea is a tandem wing aircraft, built of wood and fabric. The original design was a single-seater, and had two-axis flying controls. The aircraft had a standard control stick. Fore-and-aft movement controlled the front wing's angle of attack, increasing and decreasing the lift of the wing. Because the front wing was located forward of the center of gravity, that would pitch the nose up and down.

Side-to-side movement of the stick controlled the large rudder. This produced a rolling motion because the wings both had substantial dihedral, through yaw-roll coupling. The rudder had to be quite large not only to produce adequate roll but also because the fuselage was very short, reducing the leverage of the rudder. The Flying Flea, being a two-axis aircraft, could not be landed or taken off in substantial crosswinds. This was not a big issue when the aircraft was designed because at that time aircraft were usually flown from large open fields allowing all take-offs and landings into wind.

The result was an aircraft that was substantially simpler to build (just two wings and a rudder, two of which moved, with no ailerons or other control surfaces) and easier to fly (just a control stick, no rudder pedals at all) than a conventional aircraft. Mignet claimed, only half jokingly, that anyone who could build a packing crate and drive a car could fly a Flying Flea.

== Variants ==
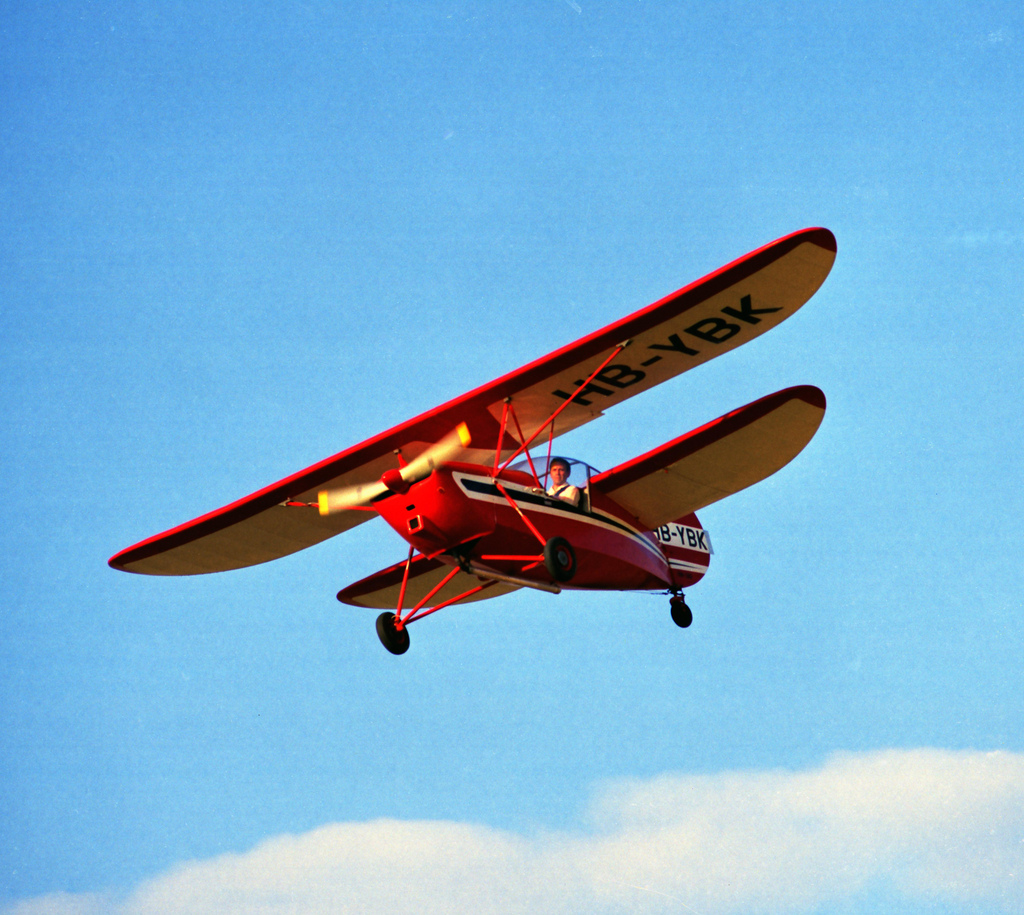
HM.380 Pou-du-Ciel (HB-YBK)

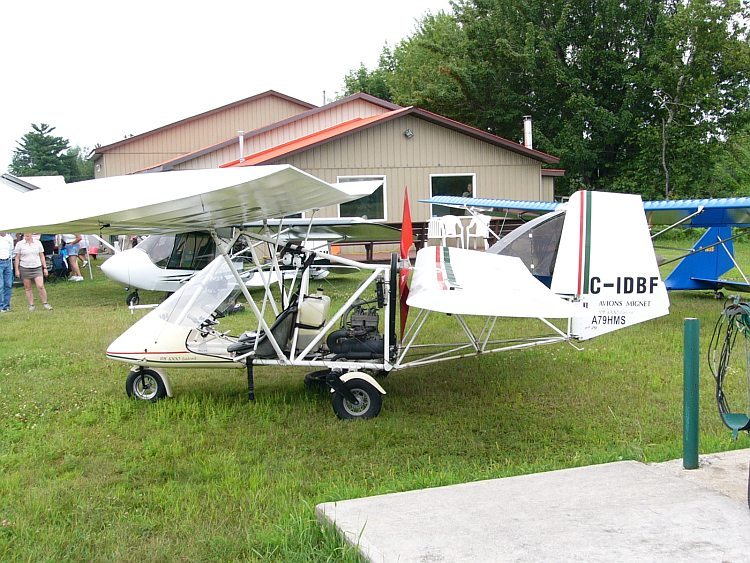
HM.1000 Balerit side view showing wing arrangement

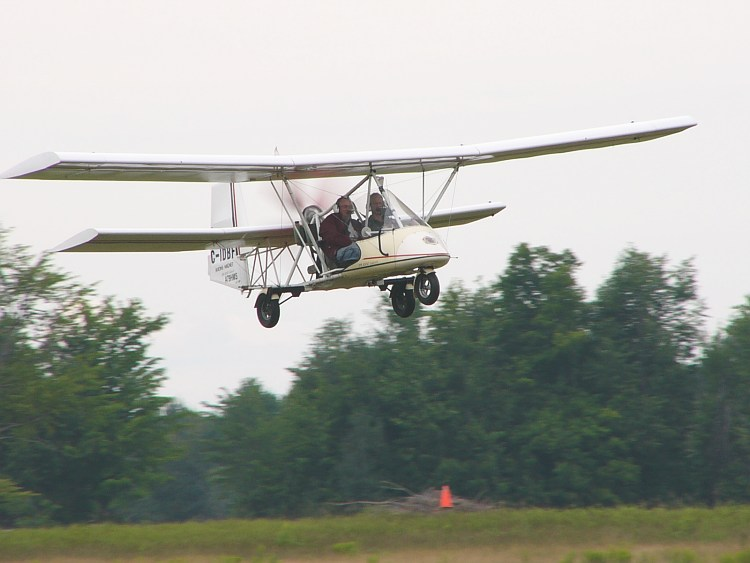
HM.1000 Balerit in flight

The HM.14 led to more than 300 different models of the Flying Flea. Some of these are:

- HM.18 – 1937, single-seat, enclosed cockpit, 35 hp Mengin engine.
- HM.16 Pou-Bébé (Baby Pou) – 1936, single-seat lightweight Pou, 25 hp Ava engine
- HM.18 – 1937, single-seat, enclosed cockpit, 35 hp Mengin engine.
- HM.19 – 1937, two-seat, enclosed cockpit, 45 hp Salmson engine.
- HM.210 – 1937, single-seat, enclosed cockpit, airworthiness certificated.
- HM.280 Pou-Maquis – 1944, single-seat, folding wings, designed as a "command parachute" for a Free French paratrooper commander.
- HM.290 – 1945, single-seat, enclosed cockpit. Became popular for amateur construction from plans, with optional enclosed cockpit, various types of engine 25 hp (19 kW) to 70 hp (52 kW). Plans are available from Falconar Avia.
- HM.293 – 1946, single-seat variant for larger pilots, typically powered by 50–60 hp Volkswagen air-cooled engine. Plans are available from Falconar Avia and also from Rodolphe Grunberg of Rocquefort, France.
- HM.310 Estafette – 1952, two-seat, enclosed cockpit, 67 kW (90 hp) Continental C90-12F engine.
- HM.320 – 1955, single-seat, enclosed cockpit.
- HM.330 Cerisier en Fleurs – 1954, two-seat, enclosed cockpit.
- HM.350 – 1957, two-seat, enclosed cockpit.
- HM.351 – 1955, two-seat, enclosed cockpit. Also known as Tachikawa R-HM
- HM.360 – 1957, single-seat, enclosed cockpit, improved wing geometry. Plans still available from Falconar Avia.
- HM.380 – 1957, two-seat, enclosed cockpit, 1100 lb gross weight, typically powered by 60–100 hp engine. Plans still available from Falconar Avia.
- HM.390 – 1981, two-seat(?), enclosed cockpit.
- HM.1000 Balerit – 1986, two-seat factory-built microlight, pusher propeller, rear-mounted 64 hp Rotax engine, designed by Mignet's son and nephew and used by the French Army.
- HM.1100 Cordouan – 1996, two-seat factory-built microlight, front-mounted 80 hp Rotax engine.

== Safety concerns ==
In the 1930s, many Fleas crashed when pilots could not recover from shallow dives, resulting in some deaths. As a result, Flying Fleas were grounded and even banned from flight permanently in some countries. In the United Kingdom, restrictions were placed on Flying Fleas, following a fatal crash on 4 May 1936 at an air display at Penshurst Airfield, Kent.

When on approach to land, the pilot would push the stick forward to gain speed for the flare and landing. As speed built up, the rear wing, operating at a greater angle of attack would gain lift and pitch the aircraft's nose further downward. The pilot's normal reaction would be to pull back on the stick. This action would increase the angle of attack on the front wing by lowering the trailing edge of the wing. Because the trailing edge of the front wing was close to the leading edge of the rear wing, the front wing's downwash would accelerate the air over the rear wing and cause it to gain lift more quickly than the front wing, resulting in an ever-increasing nose pitch-down and flight directly into the ground.

Mignet had not encountered this problem during his testing of his prototype, because he could not afford a large horsepower engine. When builders started putting larger engines on them and expanding the flight envelope, the wing interference problem surfaced.

Following a fatal accident involving G-ADXY the Air League, aware of a number of similar fatal crashes in France, sent G-AEFV to the Royal Aircraft Establishment for full-scale wind tunnel tests. These tests, together with those conducted by the French Air Ministry, discovered if the angle of attack of the front wing fell below −15° insufficient pitching moment was generated to raise the nose.

Changes to the airfoil section and wing spacing prevented aerodynamic interference and later Mignet Flea designs incorporated these changes.

By 1939, there were many improved Flying Fleas in the air, but the aircraft never completely overcame its dangerous reputation.

== Amateur construction ==
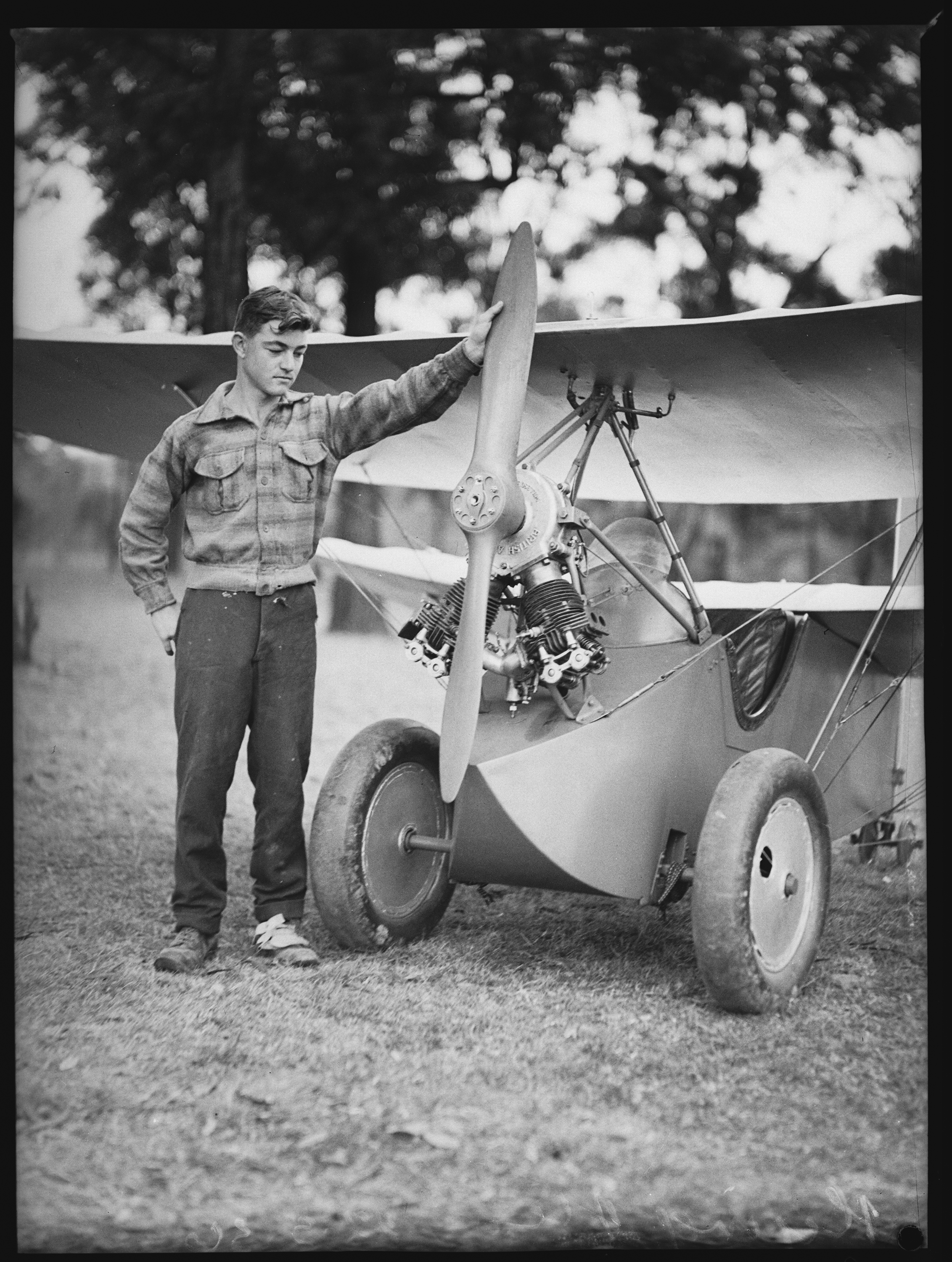
Homemade ‘Flying Flea,' Kellyville, Sydney, 1936

Shortly after the plans appeared in 1934, many enthusiasts in Europe and the USA began to build their own aircraft. In 1936 it was estimated the cost of construction was approximately £75 and that some five hundred examples were under construction in Britain.

Modern aircraft enthusiasts have continued to build their own aircraft, and vary the original HM.14 design and its derivatives over the years, and outside the UK, they are successfully flown in countries like Australia. French enthusiasts, for example, hold an annual meeting every June. Modern HM.14 builders generally adapt the airfoil and rigging or even the entire wings from later Mignet models, such as the HM.360, to the fuselage of the HM.14 to create a safe and reliable aircraft with the retro look of the original.

In 2011 Rodolphe Grunberg of Roquefort, France was still offering plans for the HM.293 single-seater for sale.

== Aircraft on display ==
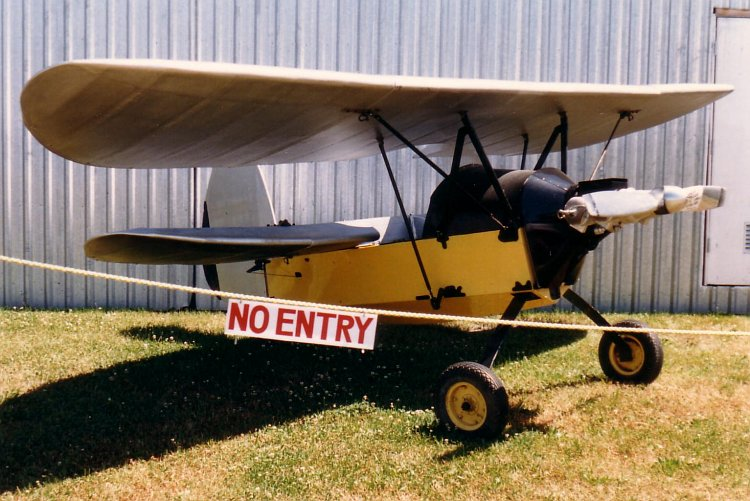
HM.290 built by John Sayle, Langley BC, 1962, with 75 hp McCulloch engine, at the Canadian Museum of Flight.

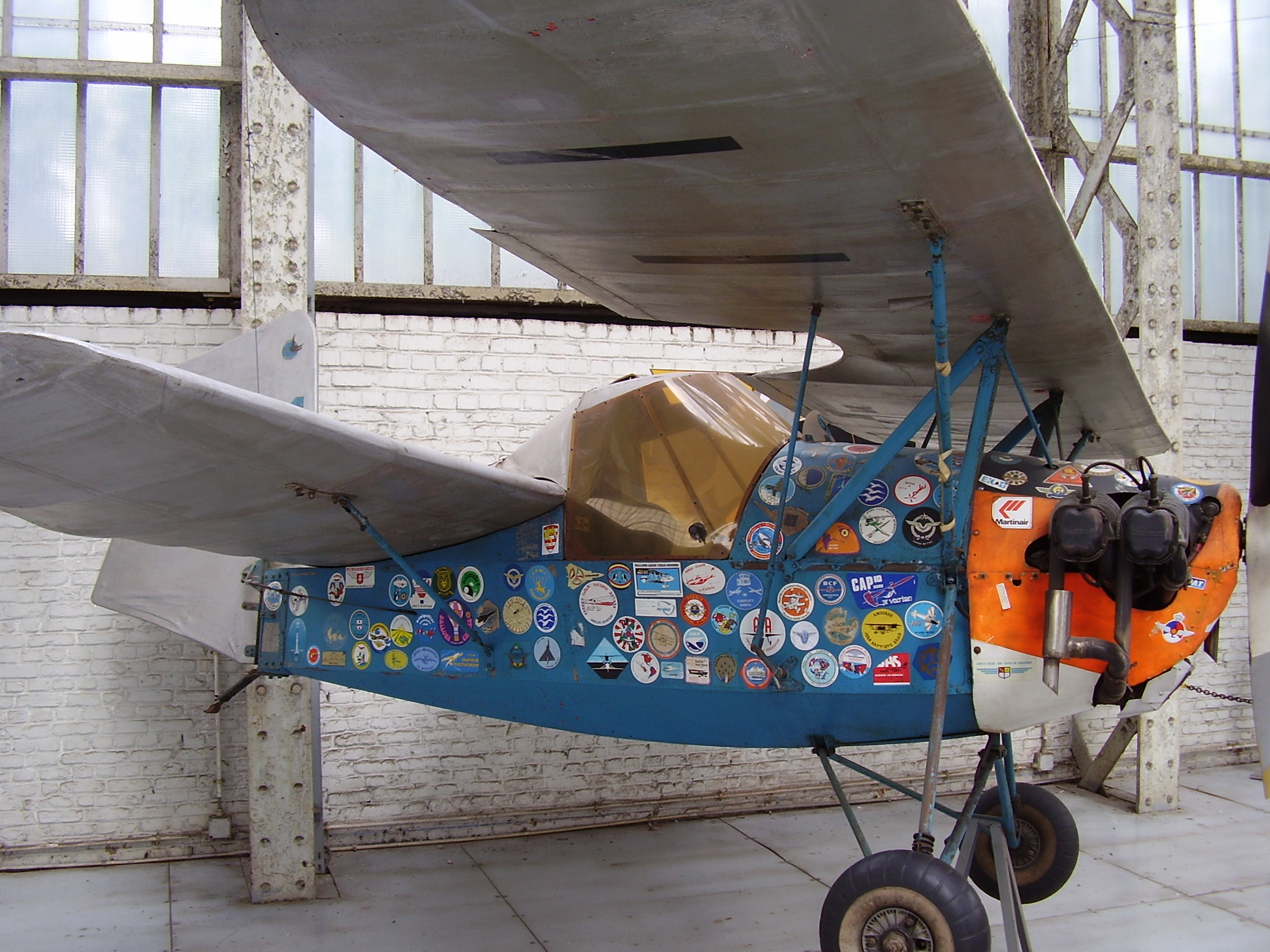
HM.293 at Royal Military Museum, Brussels

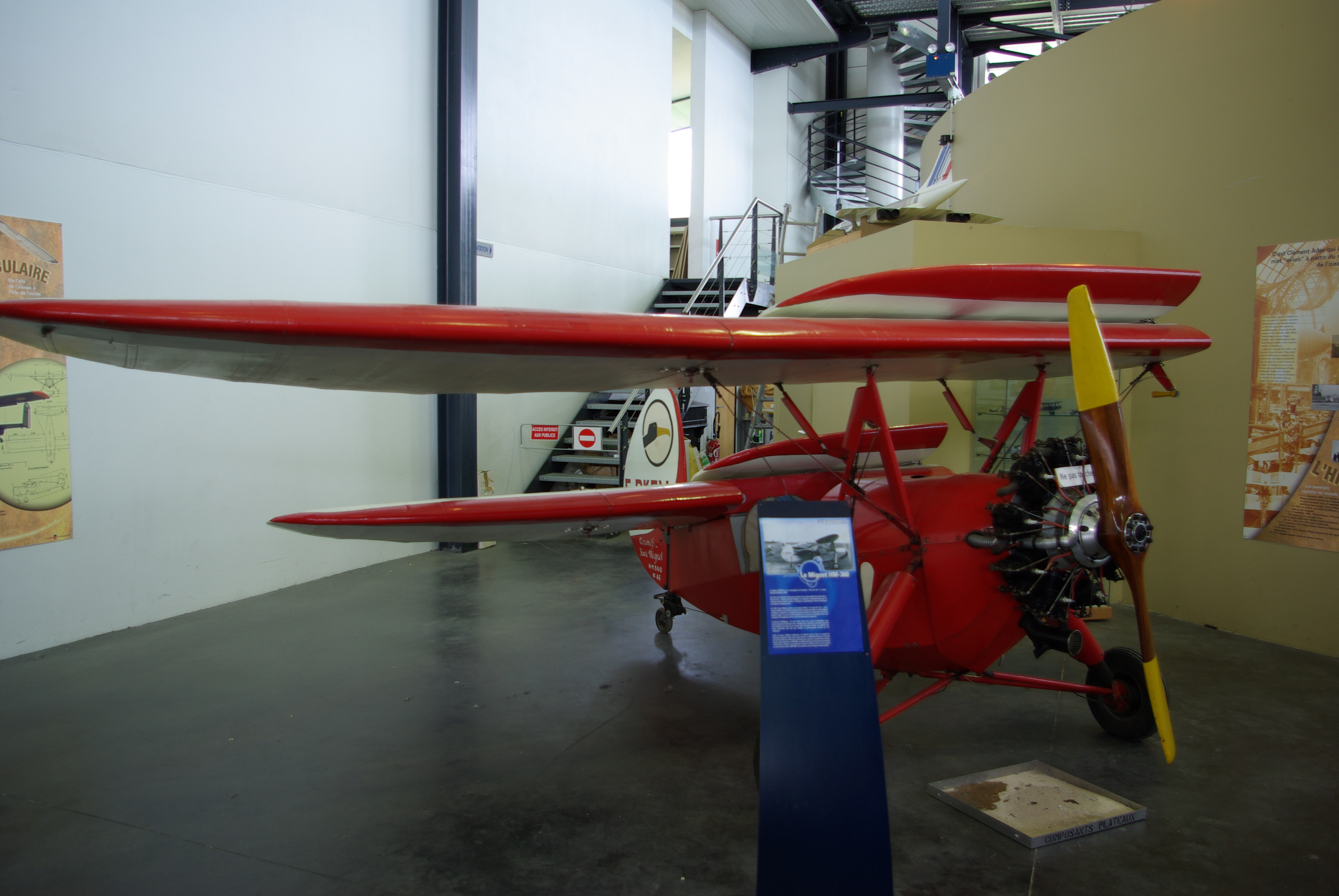
HM.360 at Musée régional de l'air d'Angers-Marcé

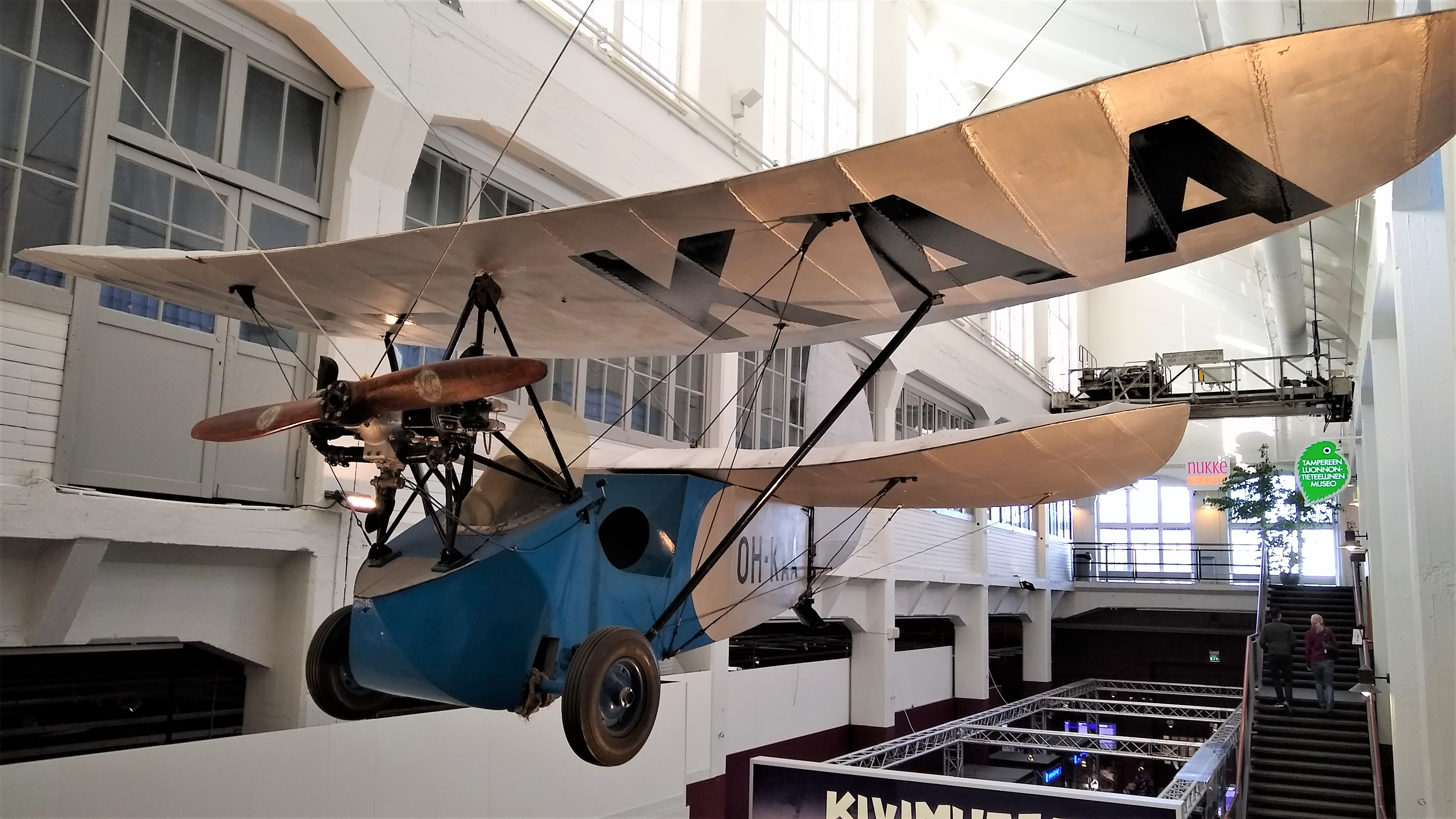
Mignet HM.14 Flying Flea displayed at Vapriikki Museum Centre, Tampere, Finland.

- Ballarat Aviation Museum, Ballarat, Victoria, Australia – HM.293
- Canadian Museum of Flight, Langley, BC, Canada – HM.290 (CF-RFH)
- Lane Motor Museum, Nashville, Tennessee - Multiple on exhibit
- Musée Régional de l'Air, Angers-Marcé, France – HM.360 (F-PKFV)
- Royal Museum of the Armed Forces and Military History, Brussels – HM.293 (OO-11)
- Royal Museum of the Armed Forces and Military History, Brussels – HM.293 (OO-33)
- Volandia, Malpensa Airport – HM.290 (I-4906)
- Vapriikki Museum Centre, Tampere, Finland – HM.14 (OH-KAA)

== Specifications (HM.293 Flying Flea) ==
Data from Plane and Pilot: 1978 Aircraft Directory

General characteristics

- Crew: 1
- Length: 4.27 m (14 ft 0 in)
- Wingspan: 6.1 m (20 ft 0 in)
- Empty weight: 186 kg (410 lb)
- Max takeoff weight: 317 kg (699 lb)
- Powerplant: 1 × McCulloch Model 4318 4-cylinder, air-cooled, horizontally-opposed, piston engine, 54 kW (72 hp) (various engines from 25-85hp)
- Propellers: 2-bladed fixed-pitch propeller

Performance

- Maximum speed: 138 km/h (86 mph, 75 kn)
- Cruise speed: 130 km/h (81 mph, 70 kn)
- Stall speed: 57 km/h (35 mph, 31 kn)
- Range: 446 km (277 mi, 241 nmi)
- Service ceiling: 7,437 m (24,400 ft)
- Rate of climb: 3.05 m/s (600 ft/min)
- Power/mass: 0.1695 kW/kg (0.1031 hp/lb)

== See also ==
- APEV Pouchel II
- APEV Pouchel Classic
- APEV Pouchelec
- APEV Pouchel Light
- Croses EC-1 Pouplume
- Croses EC-6 Criquet
- Croses EC-8 Tourisme
- Croses EC-9 Para-Cargo
- Lederlin 380L
- Pouchel
- Universal American Flea Ship

== Bibliography ==
- Bowers, Peter M. (1984) Guide to Homebuilts – Ninth Edition. TAB Books ISBN 0-8306-2364-7
- Ellis, Ken; Jones, Geoff. 1990. Henri Mignet and his Flying Fleas. Haynes Publishing ISBN 0-85429-765-0
- Mignet, Henri. Le Sport D'Air (French, 661 pages)
- Mignet, Henri. The Flying Flea: How to Build and Fly It
- Ogden, Bob (2007). Aviation Museums and Collections of North America. Air-Britain ISBN 0-85130-385-4
- Ogden, Bob (2008). Aviation Museums and Collections of The Rest of the World. Air-Britain ISBN 978-0-85130-394-9
- Ogden, Bob (2009). Aviation Museums and Collections of Mainland Europe. Air-Britain ISBN 978-0-85130-418-2
- Ord-Hume, Arthur W.J.G. Britain's Flea craze, Aeroplane Monthly, May 1973
- Ord-Hume, Arthur W. J. G. (2011) Flying Flea, Henri Mignet's Pout-du-Ciel Catrine:Stenlake Publishing. ISBN 9781840335545
- Ord-Hume, Arthur W.J.G. The First Home-Built Aeroplanes (Paperback) ISBN 978-1-84033-449-4 (Re-print of Practical Mechanics article on building the HM.14)
- Plane and Pilot (1977). 1978 Aircraft Directory. Werner & Werner Corp ISBN 0-918312-00-0
- Prins, François (Winter 1993). "Brisbane's Heritage". Air Enthusiast. No. 52. pp. 26–27. ISSN 0143-5450.
- Simpson, Rod (2001). Airlife's World Aircraft. Airlife Publishing ISBN 1-84037-115-3
