= Public liability =

Law of tort which focuses on civil wrongs

Public liability is part of the law of tort which focuses on civil wrongs. An applicant (the injured party) usually sues the respondent (the owner or occupier) under common law based on negligence and/or damages. Claims are usually successful when it can be shown that the owner/occupier was responsible for an injury, therefore they breached their duty of care.

The duty of care is very complex, but in basic terms it is the standard by which one would expect to be treated whilst one is in the care of another.

Once a breach of duty of care has been established, an action brought in a common law court would most likely be successful. Based on the injuries and the losses of the applicant, the court would award a financial compensation package.

== The law of insurance and public liability ==
In the course of managing any property, one is obligated to comply with laws and statutes administered by government and municipal bodies. These bodies impose various liabilities, of which the property owner/manager should be aware.

The most common examples of statute liability are in areas where an individual is required by law to effect insurance, e.g., workers' compensation and motor vehicle compulsory third party.

Property, hotel, and operations managers should become familiar with the various types of contracts involved in commercial and retail activities. These cover a wide field, but the more significant contracts are:

- the head lease or the management agreements
- tenancy and casual leasing agreements
- contracts with independent contractors for cleaning, lift and escalator maintenance, air conditioning and fire protection maintenance, etc.

The major contractual liability from an insurance viewpoint is undoubtedly found in head lease and management agreements. These require the manager or head lessee to fully maintain, repair and replace the property, if damaged, until expiration of the agreement or lease.

Furthermore, the contracts usually require an indemnity to the owner against liabilities imposed upon the business for injuries and property damage arising out of the use, occupation, or management of the property.

Every contract contains covenants imposing responsibilities on one or other of the parties. These should be carefully examined to ensure they are not unduly onerous.

A city even could be liable for damage to vehicles or injuries to a person, if they have not maintained the streets and the sidewalks well.

== Degrees of duty of care ==
Owner/occupiers are required to provide a certain level of care. The duty of care is not the same for all people. It is dependent on a number of issues. To assist in establishing the duty of care required, it is clearer to divide into groups the individuals who use premises and for what reasons. An example of this would be in the context of a large shopping complex, whereby the following groups of individuals would attract different levels of care.

=== Invitees ===
Invitees are people who by some form have been invited into the complex. This invitation can be through marketing and advertising, or it can be implied simply because the building is a shopping complex or hotel. The greatest duty of care is owed to invitees who, in the case of shopping centres and hotels, are mainly customers, contractors, and subcontractors. They are there because of the invitation extended to them. The duty of care owed to them is relatively simple.

One must take reasonable care to ensure the premises are safe. They in turn must take reasonable care for their own safety.

If, however, an invitee spends money for a service, i.e., forms a contract with the owner, increasing the duty of care owed. An example of this could be a game arcade where the invitee pays for a ride on a motorcycle game. If, as a result of playing this game, the invitee is electrocuted, the owner has breached their duty of care and will most likely be found to be liable for any damages.

If, however, the reason for the electrocution was not due to the owner's negligence but a product defect, and the owner has done all that is reasonably expected of an arcade owner to detect and fix this defect, the owner may proceed to sue the supplier of the game. This is because the supplier also owns a duty of care to the arcade owner as well as a contractual duty to provide safe, functioning equipment.

=== Licensees ===
These are people who enter premises with the permission of the occupier but, unlike invitees, do so without any economic advantage to the occupier. They come in the hope of doing business with the owner or their tenants and include such people as salesmen, commercial travellers, etc. The duty of care owed to licensees are not quite as extreme as in the case of the invitees.

=== Trespassers ===
These are classified as people who intrude onto property without permission. The degree of care owed to trespassers, although slight, nevertheless exists particularly in situations where a source of danger is deliberately created or where small children are involved. An example would be where live wires were left exposed after the centre had closed. If some children entered the premises for some reason, despite that reason, if they were injured the owner of the centre would be liable.

== Ballpark model ==
The ballpark model is a system under which users of a facility do so at their own risk. The name arises from the fact that visitors to a ballpark bear the risk of getting hit by bats, balls, and other objects flying into the stands at high velocities. An example of this type of system is New Hampshire's lack of a requirement that motorists carry liability insurance. The risk of getting hit by a driver who has neither insurance nor the means to pay for damages is borne by other motorists. It is in contrast to the Disneyland model.

== Disneyland model ==
The Disneyland model is a proposed system in which users of a service would bear no risk for damage or injuries they sustain that are caused by others, as full liability would be imposed upon the responsible party (and/or their insurers). It is in contrast to the ballpark model, under which people use a service at their own risk. The Disneyland model is frequently advocated as a method by which licensure of motorists and their vehicles could be privatized. Before a person would be granted a license plate, they would need to obtain liability insurance without any caps on coverage amount. The name comes from the fact that at Disneyland, the company is liable for any accidents that befall a customer if they, for instance, ride a ride they were too short for.
