= Peynier =

Commune in Provence-Alpes-Côte d'Azur, France

- Commune
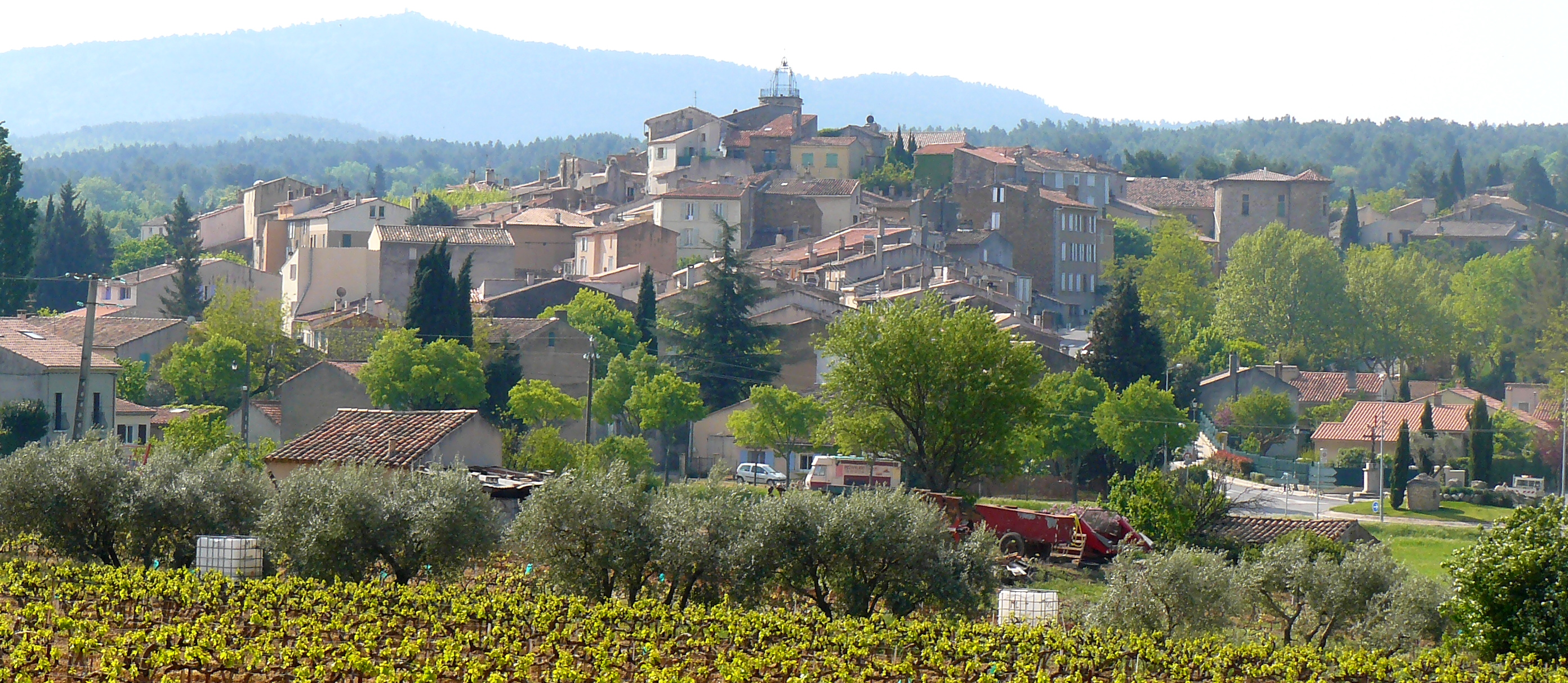
- A view of Peynier, from the cemetery

- Coat of arms
- Location of Peynier
- Location within France Location within Provence-Alpes-Côte d'Azur
- Coordinates: 43°26′52″N 5°38′32″E
- Country: France
- Region: Provence-Alpes-Côte d'Azur
- Department: Bouches-du-Rhône
- Arrondissement: Aix-en-Provence
- Canton: Trets
- Intercommunality: Aix-Marseille-Provence

Government
  - Mayor (2026–32): Christian Burle
- Area^{1}: 24.76 km^{2} (9.56 sq mi)
- Elevation: 220 m (720 ft)
- Highest elevation: 500 m (1,600 ft)
- Lowest elevation: 211 m (692 ft)
- Population (2023): 3,739
  - Density: 151.0/km^{2} (391.1/sq mi)
- Time zone: UTC+01:00 (CET)
  - Summer (DST): UTC+02:00 (CEST)
- INSEE/Postal code: 13072 /13790
- ^{1} French Land Register data, which excludes lakes, ponds, glaciers > 1 km^{2} (0.386 sq mi or 247 acres) and river estuaries.

Peynier (French pronunciation: [pɛnje]) is a commune in the Bouches-du-Rhône department in southern France.

== Population ==
Historical population

Year	Pop.	±% p.a.
1793	940	—
1800	927	−0.20%
1806	953	+0.46%
1821	946	−0.05%
1831	1,027	+0.82%
1836	997	−0.59%
1841	988	−0.18%
1846	990	+0.04%
1851	1,002	+0.24%
1856	1,040	+0.75%
1861	1,087	+0.89%
1866	1,040	−0.88%
1872	1,047	+0.11%
1876	1,005	−1.02%
1881	755	−5.56%
1886	692	−1.73%
1891	645	−1.40%
1896	654	+0.28%
1901	642	−0.37%

Year	Pop.	±% p.a.
1906	618	−0.76%
1911	582	−1.19%
1921	552	−0.53%
1926	490	−2.35%
1931	552	+2.41%
1936	506	−1.73%
1946	489	−0.34%
1954	592	+2.42%
1962	690	+1.93%
1968	819	+2.90%
1975	1,160	+5.10%
1982	1,741	+5.97%
1990	2,475	+4.50%
1999	2,781	+1.30%
2007	3,025	+1.06%
2012	2,974	−0.34%
2017	3,480	+3.19%
2023	3,739	+1.20%

Source: EHESS and INSEE (1968-2023)

== See also ==
- Communes of the Bouches-du-Rhône department
