= Henri Mignet =

French aircraft designer

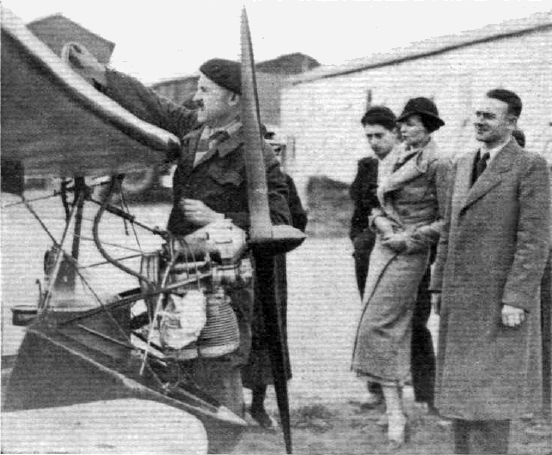
Henri Mignet in 1935

Henri Mignet (19 October 1893 – 31 August 1965) was a French radio engineer who became well known as an aircraft designer and builder. His most famous design is the Flying Flea family of aircraft.

== Early interest in aviation ==
Mignet was born in Charente-Maritime. In 1911, when he was 18 years old, he started corresponding with Gustav Lilienthal (the brother of Otto Lilienthal) about aviation. In 1912, he built his first aircraft, the HM.1-1 model. It was a monoplane inspired by the creations of Otto Lilienthal.

== Service in the First World War ==
Between 1914 and 1918, Mignet served in the French army. He was a radio operator during World War I. In 1918, he was hospitalized with malaria.

== Post World War I designs ==
In 1920, Mignet finished his first powered aircraft prototype, the HM.2. This bore many similarities to, and took inspiration from, the designs of Louis Blériot. Later in describing this aircraft he said, "All the components worked, but not together..." In 1922, he constructed the HM.3 "The Dromedary", the HM.4 parasol, and airplane with no rudder and an Anzani 10 CV engine, and the HM.5, a sailplane. In 1924, he sold the HM.5 sailplane for a large sum of money.

In 1925, he was forced to start raising chickens to finance the development of his HM.6 project, a pusher propeller aircraft, and a helicopter, designated the HM.7.

In 1926, Mignet married Annette Triou, who was later murdered by Communist gunmen in 1944.

== The HM.8 Avionnette ==
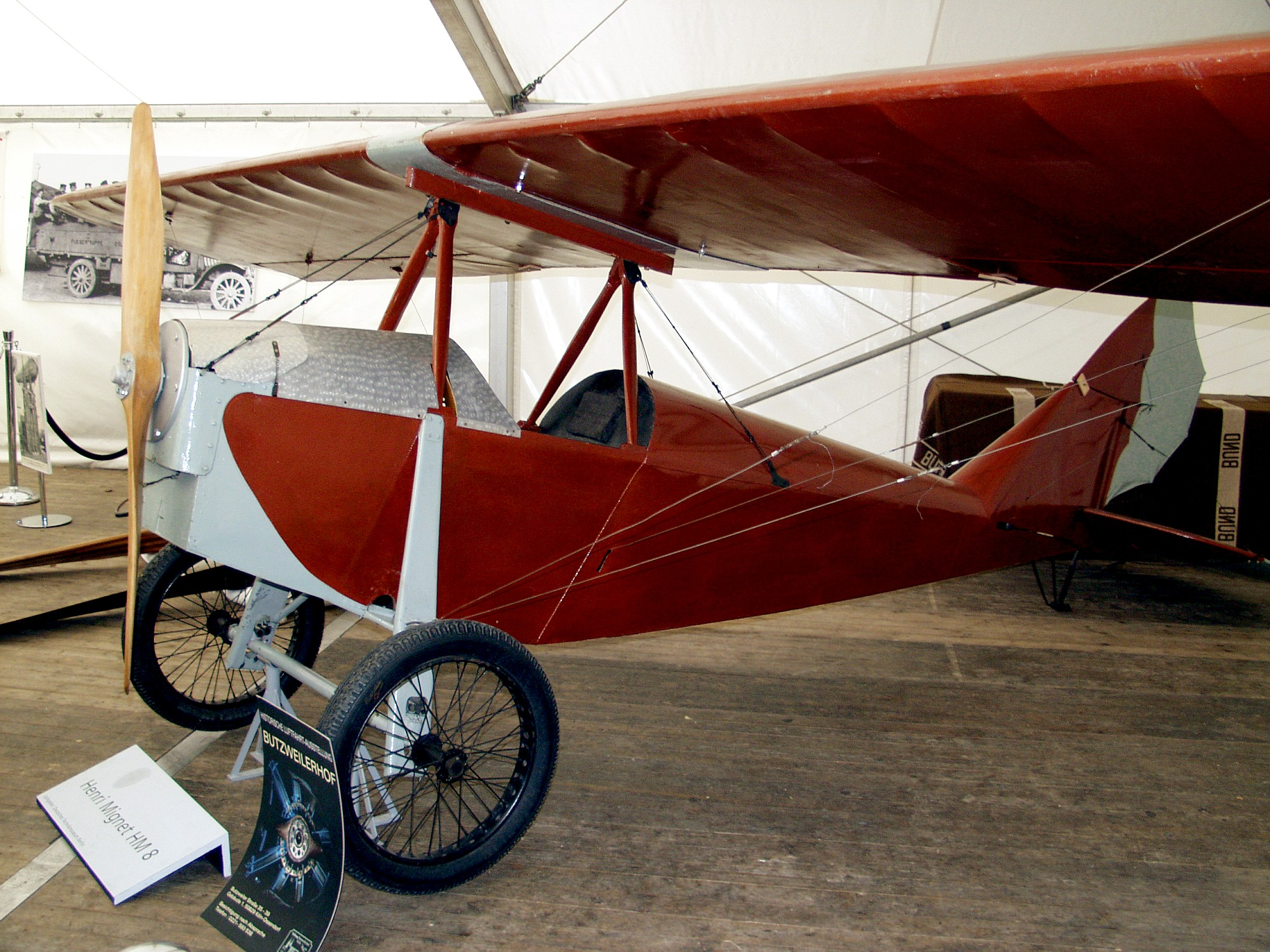
Mignet HM.8 at Cologne, Germany

In March 1928, Mignet wrote an article in the magazine Les Ailes ("Wings" in English), describing his HM.8 Avionnette. It was a parasol monoplane that he built in 1928 using parts from his HM.6, including a modified 10 hp Anzani engine. In 1929, the first amateur-built HM.8s made their maiden flights. In 1931, he published a book, Comment j'ai Construit mon Avionnette (How I built my Avionnette), containing the plans for the HM.8. Mignet encouraged amateurs to build HM.8s while he continued his research towards a new concept that became the "Pou du Ciel". About 200 HM.8s were built, with various engines, including 17 hp (13 kW) 540 cc Aubier et Dunne, 500 cc Chaise, 24 hp Harley-Davidson, 35 hp ABC Scorpion, 40 hp Salmson. Some of those directly drove the propeller, others employed a chain drive.

== The HM.14 Pou du Ciel ==
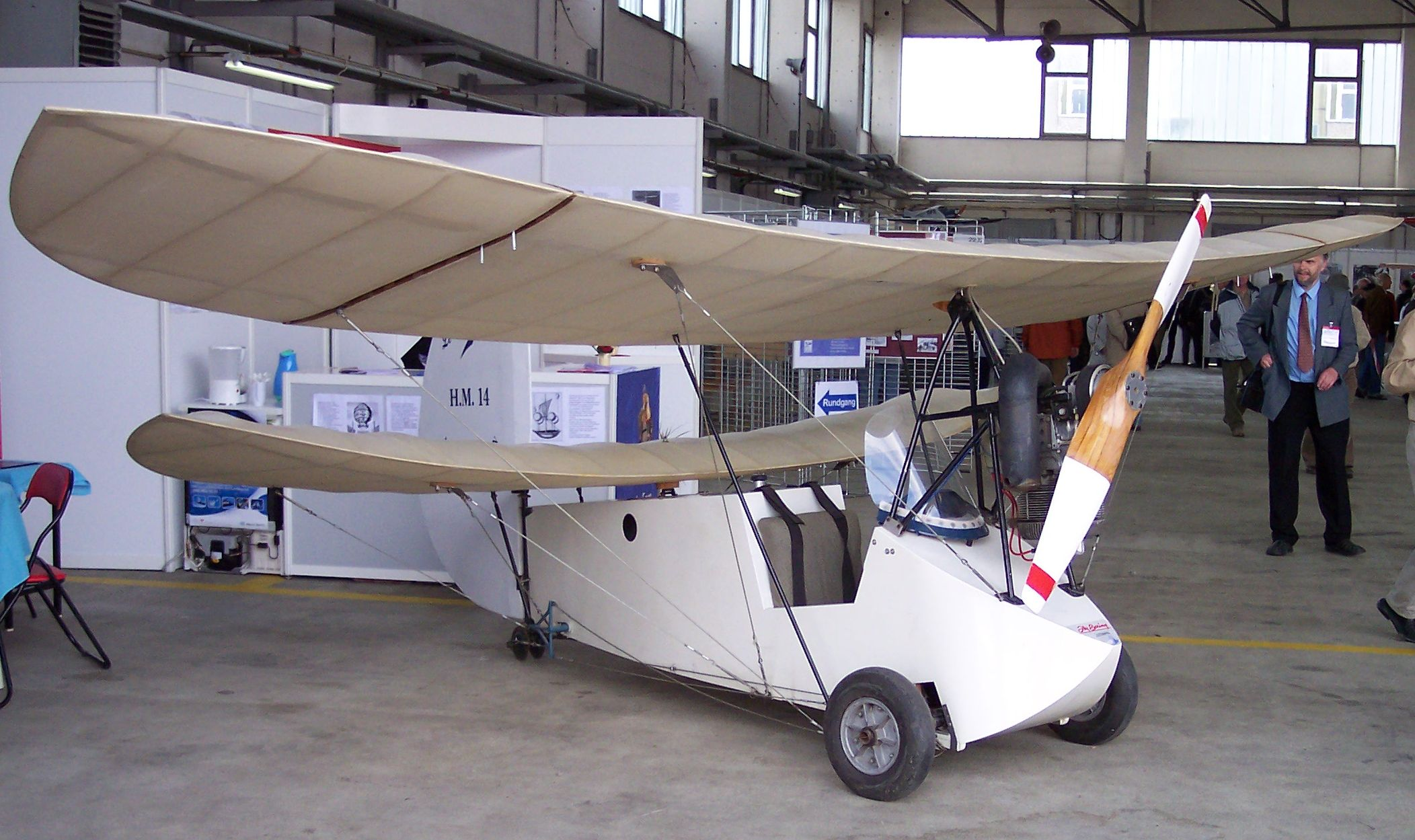
Mignet HM.14 : The first Pou-du-Ciel

On 10 September 1933, Mignet made his maiden flight in the HM.14, the first of his Mignet Pou-du-Ciel (Flying Flea) designs. In 1934, he published Le Sport de l'Air and playfully called the aircraft Pou du Ciel (literally "Louse of the Sky" in French) with the intention that it would be built by amateurs.

In 1936, after a number of fatal accidents, the HM.14 was tested in wind tunnels in France and in England, and a design fault was identified and corrected. The Flying Flea subsequently became a great, if controversial, success in the aviation world. The fatal accidents due to the initial, flawed, design meant that professional aircraft manufacturers were very reluctant to produce versions of the Pou.

Mignet encouraged amateur-builders to construct the HM.14, but he also carried on designing further models into the 1960s, all of them based on the Flying Flea concept.

Mignet died, aged 71, in Pessac in Gironde.

== Bibliography ==
- Bowers, Peter M. 1984. Guide to Homebuilts - Ninth Edition, Chapter 7 Shattered Dreams, pages 73–78. TAB Books ISBN 0-8306-2364-7
- Ellis, Ken; Jones, Geoff. 1990. Henri Mignet and his Flying Fleas. Haynes Publishing ISBN 0-85429-765-0
