= Blue Yonder EZ King Cobra =

Canadian homebuilt light aircraft

EZ King Cobra

General information
- Type: Kit plane
- National origin: Canada
- Manufacturer: Blue Yonder Aviation
- Designer: Wayne Winters
- Primary user: Private owners
- Number built: 1

History
- Introduction date: 1998
- First flight: 1998
- Developed from: Merlin
- Variant: EZ Harvard

The Blue Yonder EZ King Cobra is a Canadian designed and built, single-engined, single-seat aircraft provided as a completed aircraft or in kit form by Blue Yonder Aviation. The aircraft is approximately a 60% scale replica of the Second World War Bell P-63 Kingcobra fighter.

The aircraft can be constructed in Canada as a basic ultra-light, or amateur-built aircraft, but is not currently available as an advanced ultra-light.

== Development ==
The EZ King Cobra was designed by Wayne Winters of Indus, Alberta and based on the earlier EZ Merlin. The project was started as a customer request for an ultralight category scale replica of a fighter and was later offered as a commercially available kit aircraft.

Winters created the EZ King Cobra by designing a new cantilever wing based on the Merlin wing, itself based on the Lazair wing design. The fuselage is constructed of welded 4130 steel tube and has a canopy and fin that resembles the original fighter design. The aircraft retained the Junker's ailerons of the original Merlin wing along with the Clark "Y" airfoil and construction featuring a leading edge "D" cell and foam ribs. The prototype is powered by a Rotax 582 two stroke engine of 64 hp (48 kW).

The prototype of the new design flew in 1998. In the basic ultralight version gross weight is limited to the category maximum of 1,200 lb (544 kg).

The EZ King Cobra can accommodate a variety of powerplants:

- Rotax 503 50 hp (37 kW)
- Rotax 582 64 hp (48 kW)
- Rotax 912 80 hp (60 kW)

== Operational history ==
Despite being widely demonstrated no further orders have been received for the type and the prototype remains the sole flying example.

== Specifications (Rotax 582) ==
Data from Blue Yonder website

General characteristics

- Crew: one
- Capacity: 657 lb (298 kg) useful load
- Length: 21 ft 0 in (6.4 m)
- Wingspan: 27 ft 0 in (8.2 m)
- Height: 6 ft 0 in (1.8 m)
- Wing area: 158 sq ft (14.7 m^{2})
- Airfoil: Clark Y
- Empty weight: 543 lb (246 kg)
- Gross weight: 1,200 lb (544 kg)
- Powerplant: 1 × Rotax 582 fixed pitch, 64 hp (48 kW)

Performance

- Maximum speed: 120 mph (194 km/h, 100 kn)
- Cruise speed: 90 mph (146 km/h, 78 kn)
- Stall speed: 30 mph (49 km/h, 26 kn)
- Range: 460 mi (740 km, 400 nmi)
- Service ceiling: 14,000 ft (4,270 m)
- Power/mass: 18.75 lb/hp (0.09 kW/kg)

== See also ==
- Blue Yonder EZ Harvard
