= Blue Yonder Twin Engine EZ Flyer =

Canadian ultralight aircraft

Twin Engine EZ Flyer
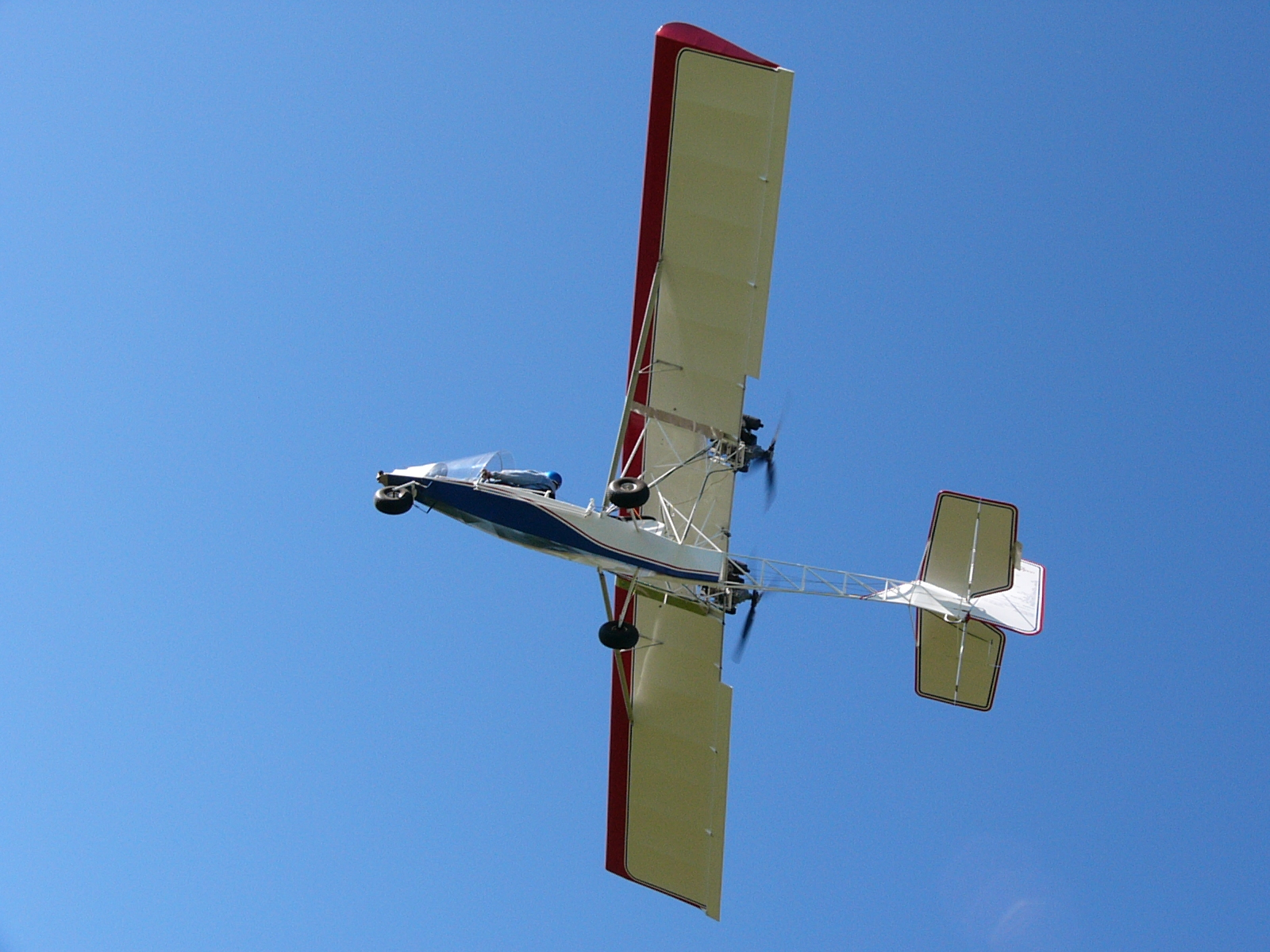
- The prototype Twin Engine EZ Flyer C-ITEZ

General information
- Type: Kit plane
- National origin: Canada
- Manufacturer: Blue Yonder Aviation
- Designer: Wayne Winters
- Primary user: Private owners
- Number built: 1

History
- Introduction date: 1999
- First flight: 1999
- Developed from: EZ Flyer

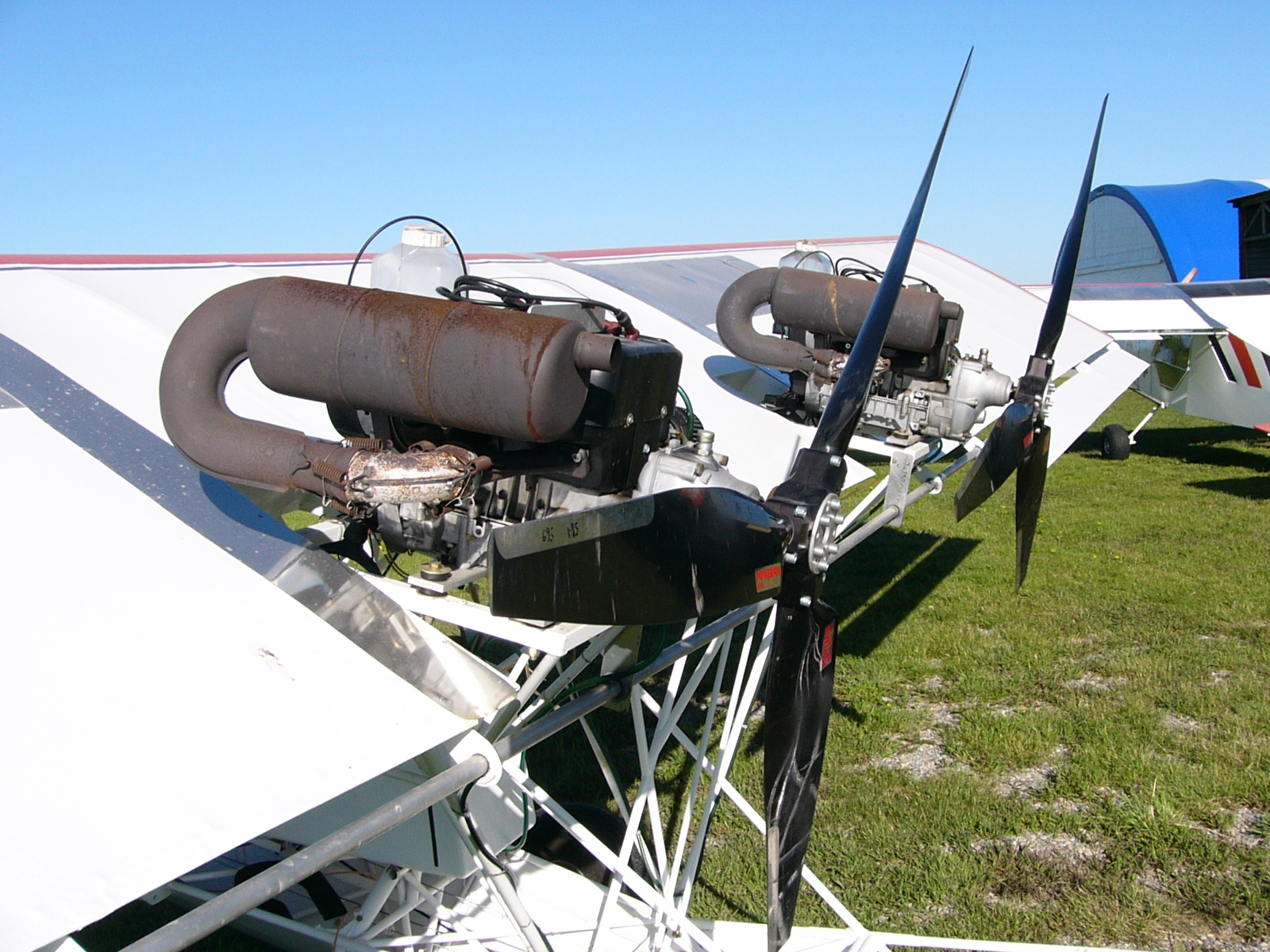
The twin Rotax 503 engines mounted on the Twin Engine EZ Flyer prototype

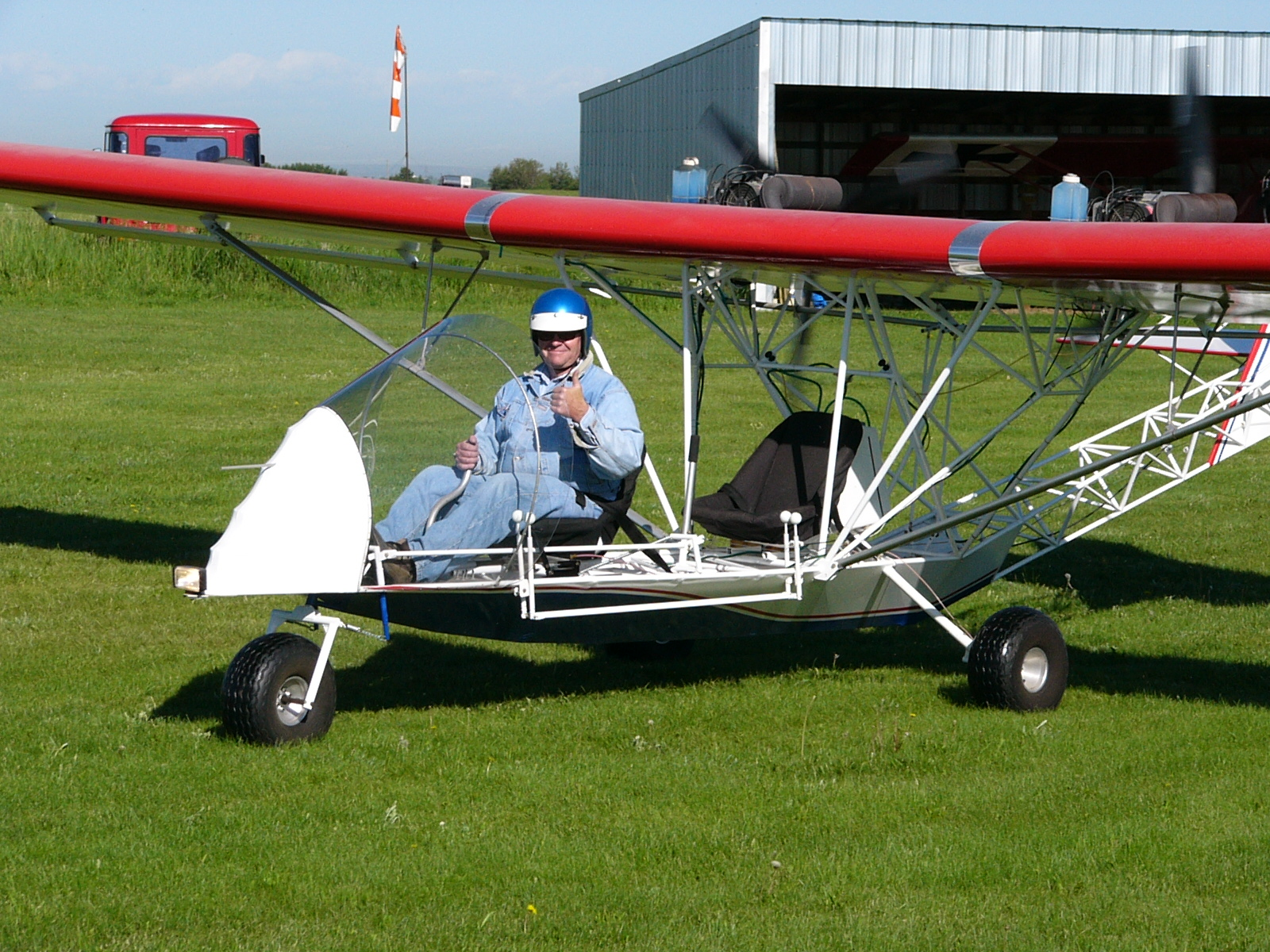
Aircraft designer Wayne Winters taxis the prototype Twin Engine EZ Flyer

The Blue Yonder Twin Engine EZ Flyer is a Canadian designed and built, pusher configuration twin-engined, tandem two-seat, open cockpit aircraft provided as a completed aircraft or in kit form by Blue Yonder Aviation.

The aircraft can be constructed in Canada as a basic ultra-light, or amateur-built aircraft.

== Development ==
The Twin Engine EZ Flyer was designed by Wayne Winters of Indus, Alberta and based on the earlier EZ Flyer. Taking inspiration from the twin-engined Ultraflight Lazair and the Leza-Lockwood Air Cam the aircraft was especially designed for the air-to-ground photography role and also for use over hostile terrain where twin engine safety was desirable.

Winters altered the original EZ Flyer design by creating a new centre wing section to mount two powerplants instead of one, increasing the wingspan to 35.5 feet (10.8 m) and the wing area to 235 sq ft (21.8 m^{2}). The fuselage was also stretched 2.0 ft (1 m) to 23 ft (7 m) total, to give a more unimpeded view from the front seat. The aircraft retained the Junker's ailerons of the original Merlin wing along with the Clark "Y" airfoil and construction featuring a leading edge "D" cell and foam ribs. Like the original EZ Flyer, the twin engine version has an open lattice, "N" girder fuselage constructed from 4130 steel tube along with an enlarged vertical tail to improve handling in engine-out situations. The prototype has two seats in tandem and is powered by two Rotax 503 two stroke engines of 50 hp (37 kW).

The prototype of the new design flew in 1999. In the basic ultralight version gross weight is limited to the category maximum of 1,200 lb (544 kg). The amateur-built version has a gross weight of 1,400 lb (635 kg).

The Twin Engine EZ Flyer can be equipped with a variety of powerplants, all mounted side-by-side in pusher configuration:

- Rotax 503 50 hp (37 kW)
- Rotax 582 64 hp (48 kW)
- Rotax 912 80 hp (60 kW)
- Rotax 912S 100 hp (75 kW)

== Operational history ==
Despite being widely demonstrated and reviewed, the prototype remains the sole registered example.

== Operators ==
- Blue Yonder Aviation - flight school

== Specifications (Twin Engine EZ Flyer) ==
Data from Blue Yonder website

General characteristics

- Crew: one
- Capacity: one
- Length: 23 ft 0 in (7.0 m)
- Wingspan: 35 ft 6 in (10.8 m)
- Height: 7 ft 0 in (2.1 m)
- Wing area: 235 sq ft (21.9 m^{2})
- Airfoil: Clark Y
- Empty weight: 789 lb (358 kg)
- Gross weight: 1,400 lb (635 kg)
- Powerplant: 2 × Rotax 503 fixed pitch, 50 hp (37 kW) each

Performance

- Maximum speed: 100 mph (162 km/h, 87 kn)
- Cruise speed: 70 mph (113 km/h, 61 kn)
- Stall speed: 35 mph (57 km/h, 30 kn)
- Range: 352 mi (567 km, 306 nmi)
- Service ceiling: 15,000 ft (4,575 m)
- Power/mass: 14.00 lb/hp (0.12 kW/kg)

Avionics

- none

== See also ==
- Blue Yonder EZ Flyer

Aircraft of comparable role, configuration, and era

- Lockwood Aircam
