= Blue Yonder EZ Harvard =

Canadian homebuilt light aircraft

EZ Harvard
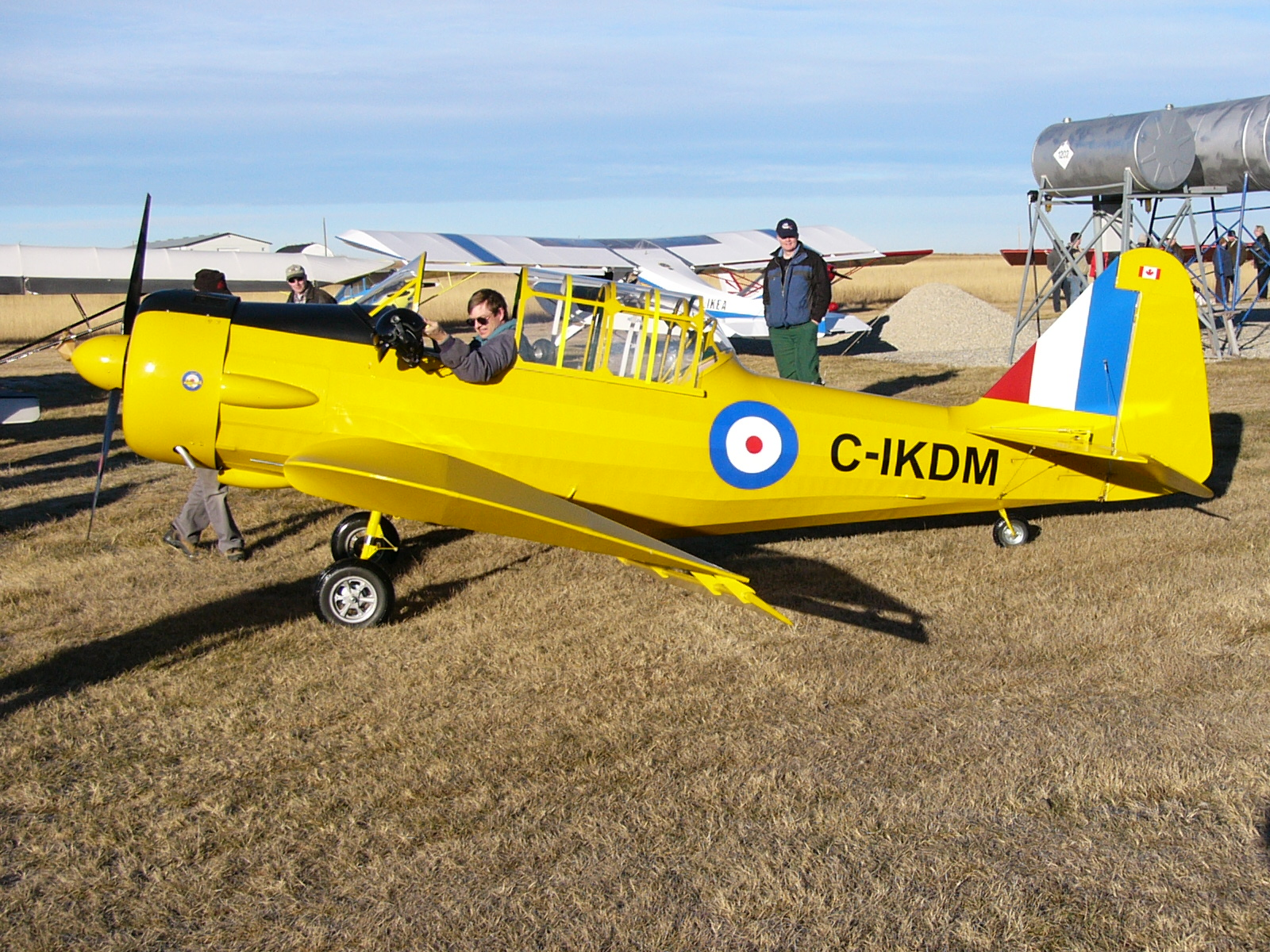
- The prototype EZ Harvard

General information
- Type: Kit plane
- National origin: Canada
- Manufacturer: Blue Yonder Aviation
- Designer: Wayne Winters
- Primary user: Private owners
- Number built: 1

History
- Introduction date: 2002
- First flight: 2002
- Developed from: EZ King Cobra

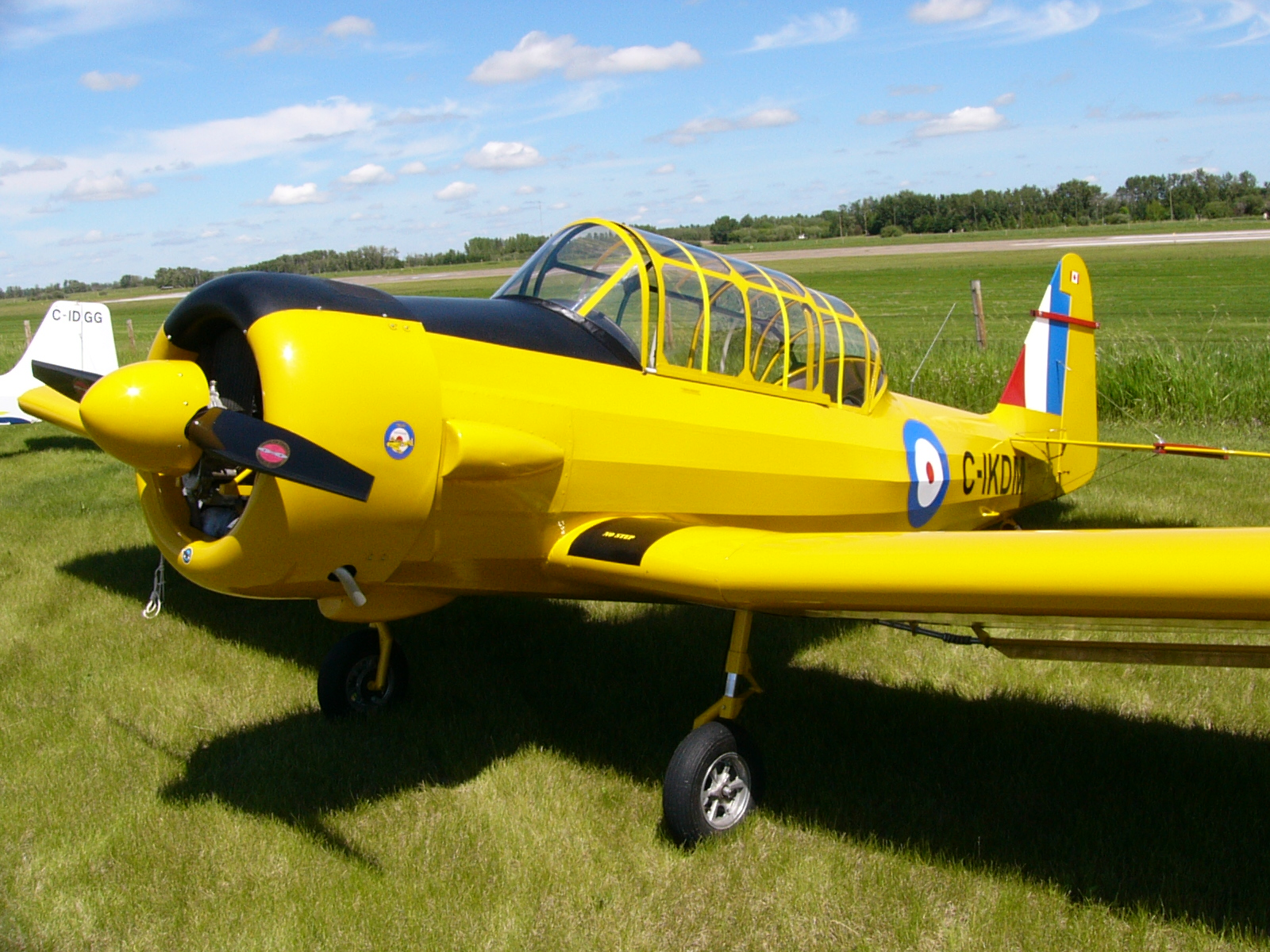
The EZ Harvard prototype

The Blue Yonder EZ Harvard is a Canadian designed and built, single-engined, single-seat aircraft provided as a completed aircraft or in kit form by Blue Yonder Aviation. The aircraft is a 75% scale replica of the North American Harvard trainer of the Second World War.

The aircraft can be constructed in Canada as a basic ultra-light, or amateur-built aircraft, but is not currently available as an advanced ultra-light.

== Development ==
The EZ Harvard was designed by Wayne Winters of Indus, Alberta and based on the earlier EZ King Cobra. The project was started as a customer request for a scale Harvard replica and was later offered as a commercially available kit aircraft.

Winters created the EZ Harvard by using the cantilever wing design from the EZ King Cobra and added 4 feet (1.2 m) additional span, to increase the wingspan to 31 feet (9.4 m) and the wing area to 176 sq ft (16.4 m^{2}). The fuselage was redesigned to give the round cross section, glazed canopy and distinctive fin shape of the original Harvard. The aircraft retained the Junkers ailerons of the original Merlin wing along with the Clark "Y" airfoil and construction featuring a leading edge "D" cell and foam ribs. The fuselage is constructed of welded 4130 steel tube. Even though the Harvard was originally a two-seat aircraft the EZ Harvard is a single seater with the prototype powered by a Rotax 582 two stroke engine of 64 hp (48 kW).

The prototype of the new design flew in 2002. In the basic ultralight version gross weight is limited to the category maximum of 1,200 lb (544 kg).

The EZ Harvard has a large round cowling that can accommodate a variety of powerplants:

- Rotax 503 50 hp (37 kW)
- Rotax 582 64 hp (48 kW)
- Rotax 912 80 hp (60 kW)

== Operational history ==
Despite being widely demonstrated no further orders have been received for the type and the prototype remains the sole flying example.

== Specifications (Rotax 582) ==
Data from Blue Yonder website

General characteristics

- Crew: one
- Capacity: 705 lb (320 kg) useful load
- Length: 21 ft 0 in (6.4 m)
- Wingspan: 31 ft 0 in (9.5 m)
- Height: 7 ft 0 in (2.1 m)
- Wing area: 176 sq ft (16.4 m^{2})
- Airfoil: Clark Y
- Empty weight: 495 lb (224 kg)
- Gross weight: 1,200 lb (544 kg)
- Powerplant: 1 × Rotax 582 fixed pitch, 64 hp (48 kW)

Performance

- Maximum speed: 100 mph (162 km/h, 87 kn)
- Cruise speed: 90 mph (146 km/h, 78 kn)
- Stall speed: 40 mph (65 km/h, 35 kn)
- Range: 382 mi (615 km, 332 nmi)
- Service ceiling: 12,000 ft (3,660 m)
- Power/mass: 18.75 lb/hp (0.09 kW/kg)

== See also ==
- Blue Yonder EZ King Cobra
