= Blue Yonder EZ Flyer =

Canadian ultralight aircraft

EZ Flyer
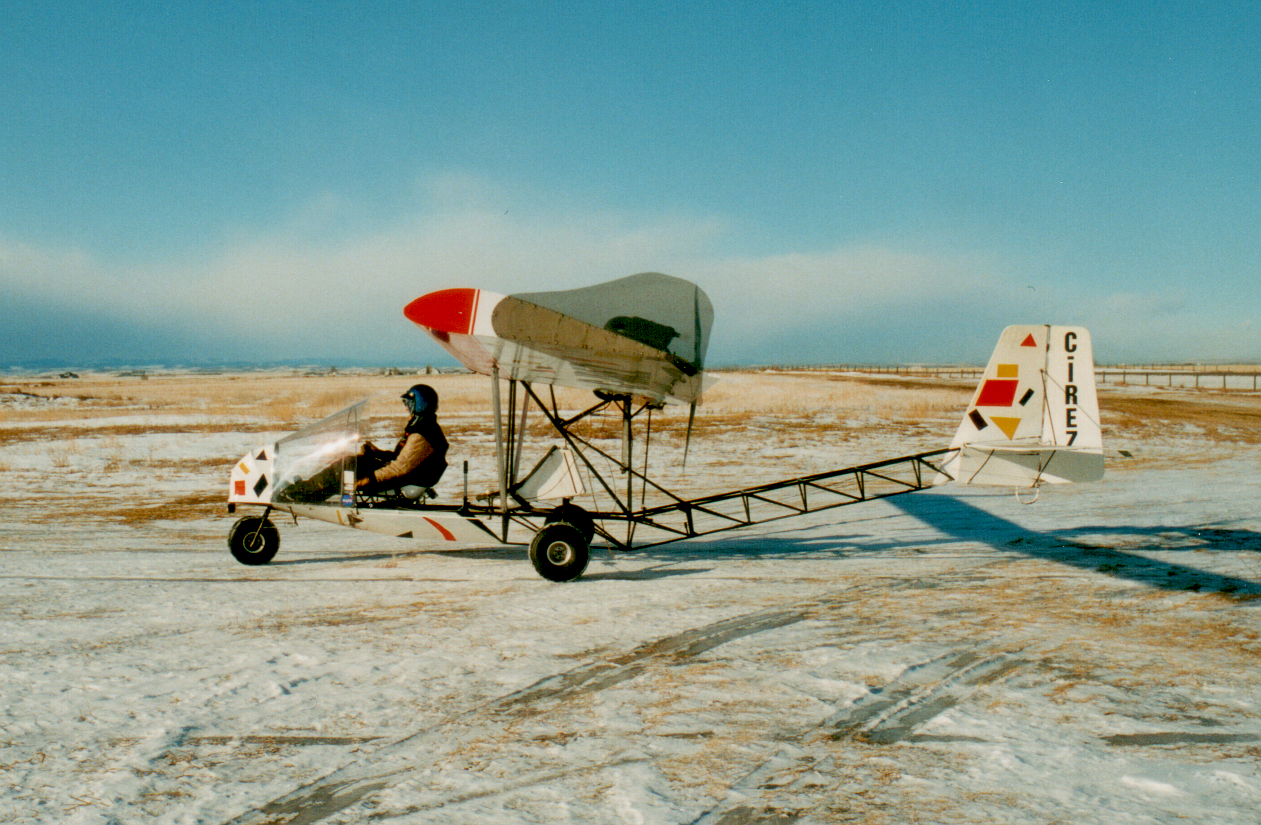

General information
- Type: Kit plane
- National origin: Canada
- Manufacturer: Blue Yonder Aviation
- Designer: Wayne Winters
- Primary user: Flight schools Private owners
- Number built: 64 (2011)

History
- Introduction date: October 1991
- First flight: October 1991
- Developed from: Merlin
- Variant: Twin Engine EZ Flyer

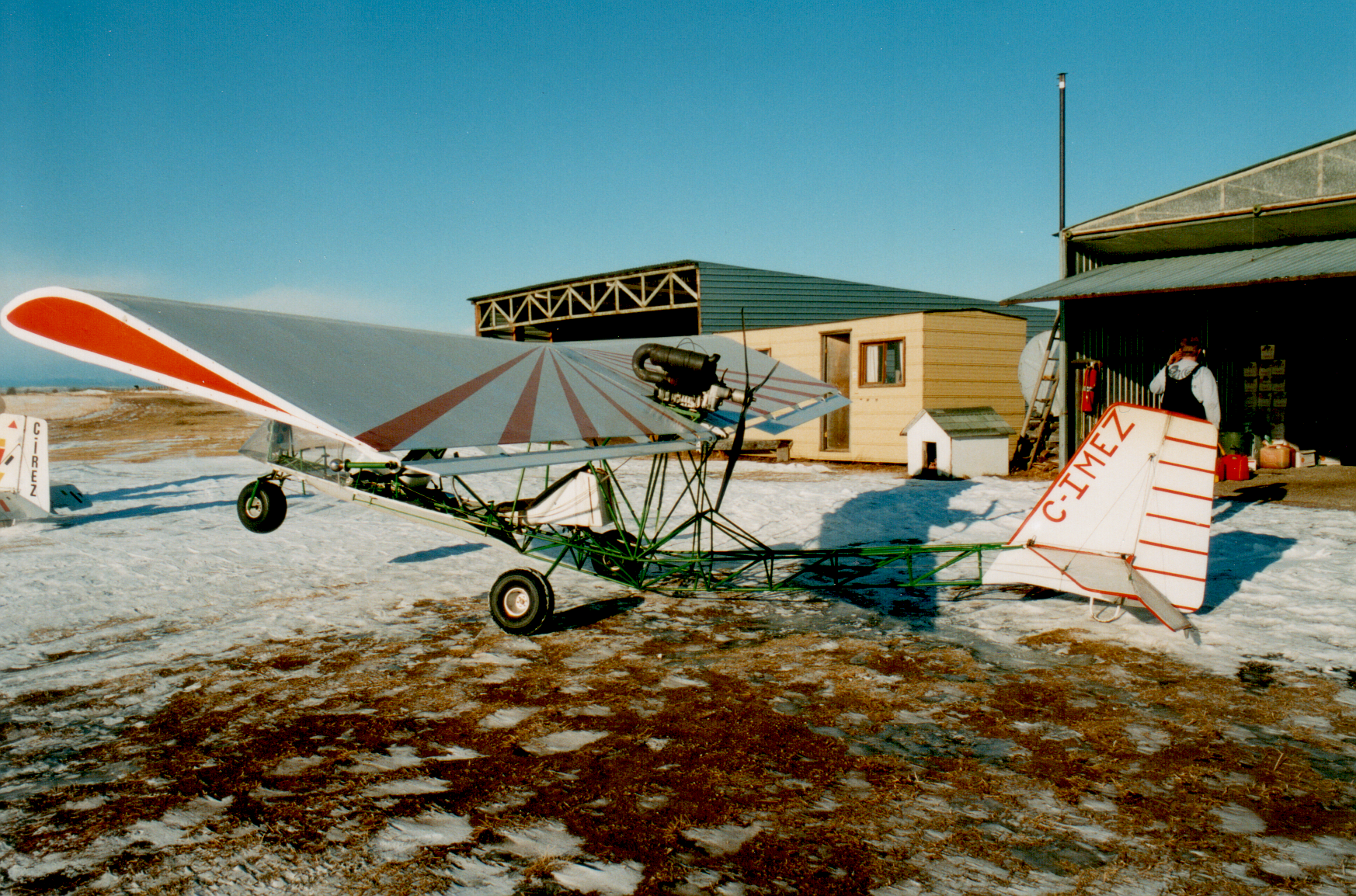
The prototype EZ Flyer powered by a Rotax 503 engine

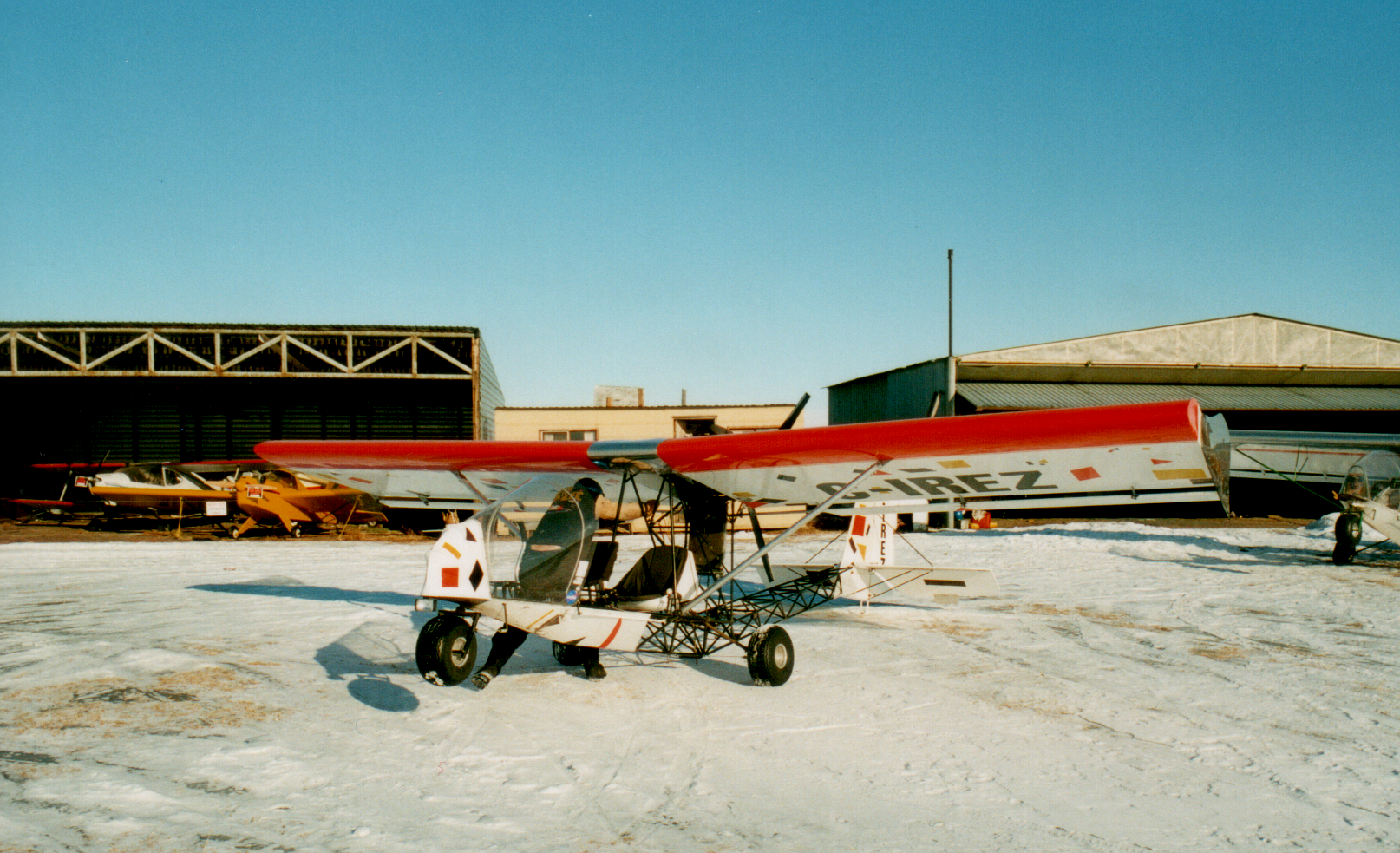
EZ Flyer at Blue Yonder Aviation 1998

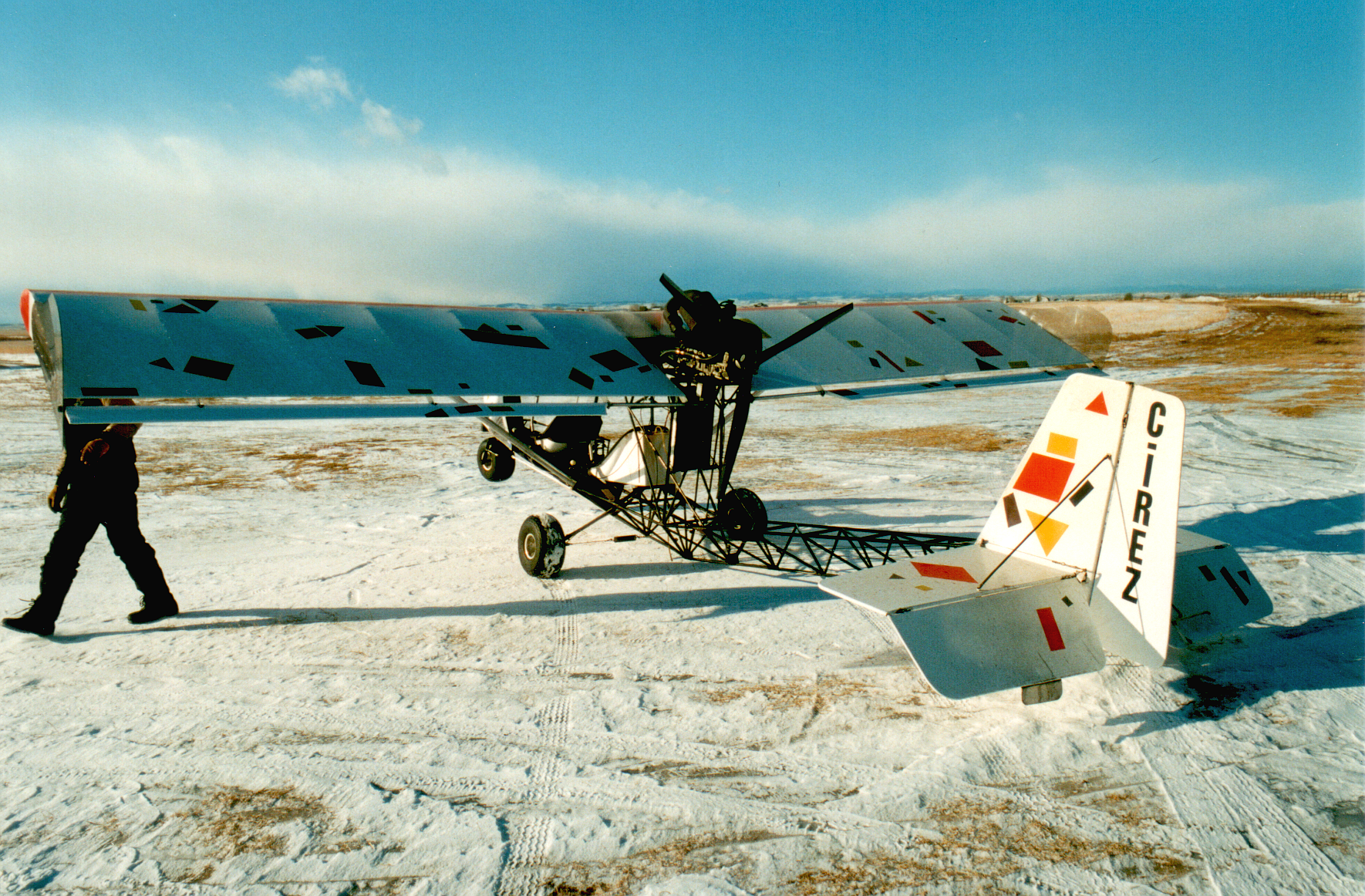
EZ Flyer showing its Rotax 582 engine installation

The Blue Yonder EZ Flyer is a Canadian-designed-and-built, tandem two-seat, open cockpit, pusher configuration, recreational and training aircraft provided as a completed aircraft or in kit form by Blue Yonder Aviation.

It can be constructed in Canada as a basic ultra-light, an advanced ultra-light or amateur-built aircraft.

== Development ==
The EZ Flyer was the first aircraft design of Wayne Winters of Indus, Alberta. In 1991 Winters set out to design a high performance kit plane that he intended to produce commercially. While considering the design parameters of that proposed aircraft he saw a picture of a Breezy homebuilt and decided instead to design a smaller and lighter aircraft inspired by the Breezy instead. Winter's own past experience flying Ultraflight Lazairs provided the motivation for the design of a slow, easy to handle aircraft with an open cockpit.

Winters designed a new open lattice, "N" girder fuselage constructed from 4130 steel tube along with a new tail to be fitted with wings from the Merlin EZ. The aircraft retained the Junker's ailerons of the Merlin along with the Clark "Y" airfoil that produces docile handling characteristics. The wing also features the Merlin's leading edge "D" cell construction, with foam ribs. The prototype has two seats in tandem and is powered by a Rotax 503 two stroke engine of 50 hp (37 kW).

The first prototype of the new design flew in October 1991 and was initially unnamed. Winters allowed several pilots to fly the new design and all remarked on its docile handling, its suitability as a trainer and the ease with which pilots mastered it. As a result, Winters initially named it Easy Flyer and later EZ Flyer (pronounced in the American way as "Eezee Flier").

The EZ Flyer can be equipped with a variety of powerplants, all mounted in pusher configuration:

- Rotax 503 50 hp (37 kW)
- Rotax 582 64 hp (48 kW)
- Rotax 912 80 hp (60 kW)
- Rotax 912S 100 hp (75 kW)

== Operational history ==
The prototype proved robust and easy for students to learn to fly on and has been used since new as a trainer at the Blue Yonder Ultralight Flight School. By May 2001 the prototype had 2500 hours accumulated in student training and showed little signs of wear. Over 30 aircraft have been built for private owners and other flight schools.

In November 2016 there were eight EZ Flyers registered in Canada and eight in the USA.

== Operators ==
- Blue Yonder Aviation – flight school

== Specifications (Rotax 582) ==
Data from Blue Yonder website

General characteristics

- Crew: one
- Capacity: one passenger
- Length: 21 ft 0 in (6.4 m)
- Wingspan: 31 ft 0 in (9.5 m)
- Height: 7 ft 0 in (2.1 m)
- Wing area: 176 sq ft (16.4 m^{2})
- Airfoil: Clark Y
- Empty weight: 495 lb (224 kg)
- Gross weight: 1,200 lb (544 kg)
- Powerplant: 1 × Rotax 582 fixed pitch, 64 hp (48 kW)

Performance

- Maximum speed: 100 mph (162 km/h, 87 kn)
- Cruise speed: 70 mph (113 km/h, 61 kn)
- Stall speed: 38 mph (62 km/h, 33 kn)
- Range: 382 mi (615 km, 380 nmi)
- Service ceiling: 12,000 ft (3,660 m)
- Power/mass: 18.75 lb/hp (0.09 kW/kg)

Avionics

- none

== See also ==
- Blue Yonder Merlin

Aircraft of comparable role, configuration, and era

- RLU-1 Breezy
- Harper Lil Breezy
- Mathews Petit Breezy
