= Fun flyer =

Fun flyer, Funflyer or Fun Flyer can refer to:

- Blue Yonder EZ Fun Flyer, a Canadian ultralight aircraft
- Ikarus Funflyer, a German hang glider
