= Blue Yonder Aviation =

Canadian aircraft manufacturer

- Company type: Private company
- Industry: Aerospace
- Founder: Wayne Winters
- Headquarters: Indus, Alberta, Canada
- Key people: President: Wayne Winters
- Products: Kit plane manufacturing
- Number of employees: 3 (2005)
- Website: www.ezflyer.com

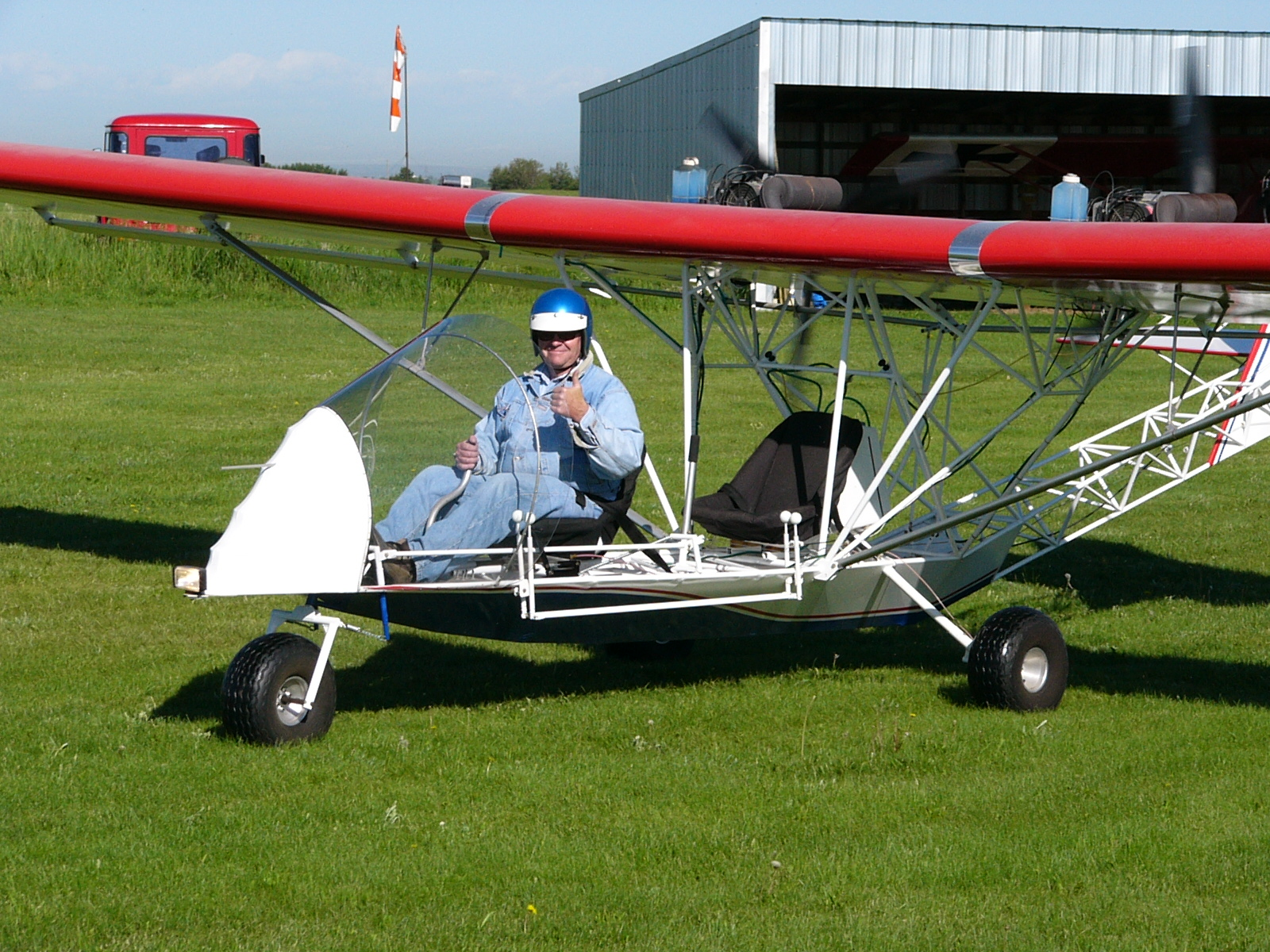
Blue Yonder President and designer Wayne Winters taxis the prototype Twin Engine EZ Flyer

Blue Yonder Aviation is a Canadian aircraft manufacturer, specializing in kit aircraft for the North American amateur-built aircraft and ultralight markets.

The company website seems to have been taken down in late 2016 and the company may have gone out of business.

== Origins ==
The company was originally formed by Wayne Winters in 1986 as a flying school teaching students on a single Spectrum Beaver RX550 at Indus/Winters Aire Park south of Calgary, Alberta.

The airport had originally been purchased in 1914 by Miltor L. Winters from the Canadian Pacific Railway for Cdn$24 per acre. In 1946 upon returning home from the Second World War Ralph C. Winters purchased the land from the older Winters. In 1970 he graded the first runway on the property. Ralph Winters son, Wayne Winters assumed operation of the airport when his father retired. The airport is home to a large community of pilots and aircraft, including a large number of ultralights.

== Present history ==
In 1996, Blue Yonder purchased the rights to the Merlin from Merlin Aircraft and started manufacturing the aircraft in a converted pig barn on the property. Winters designed the open-cockpit EZ Flyer in 1991 and the Twin Engine EZ Flyer in 1999. The EZ Flyer proved successful and 30 have been completed alongside approximately 50 Merlins. Blue Yonder constructs kits or completed aircraft on a made-to-order basis. For several years US manufacturer Comp Air marketed Blue Yonder-produced Merlin kits in the USA under the name "Aero Comp Merlin", although this arrangement is no longer in effect.

In 2011 the company introduced a single-seat twin-engine, single-seat, high-wing aircraft, marketed as the Blue Yonder EZ Fun Flyer. Only one was registered in Canada.

== Aircraft ==
Summary of aircraft built by Blue Yonder Aircraft
Model name	First flight	Number built	Type
Merlin	1986	50	cabin monoplane
EZ Flyer	1991	30	open cockpit monoplane
EZ King Cobra	1998	1	P-63 Kingcobra replica
Twin Engine EZ Flyer	1999	1	Twin engine observation aircraft
EZ Harvard	2002	1	Harvard replica
EZ Fun Flyer	2011	1	Inspired by the Ultraflight Lazair

== Merlin Manufacturers ==
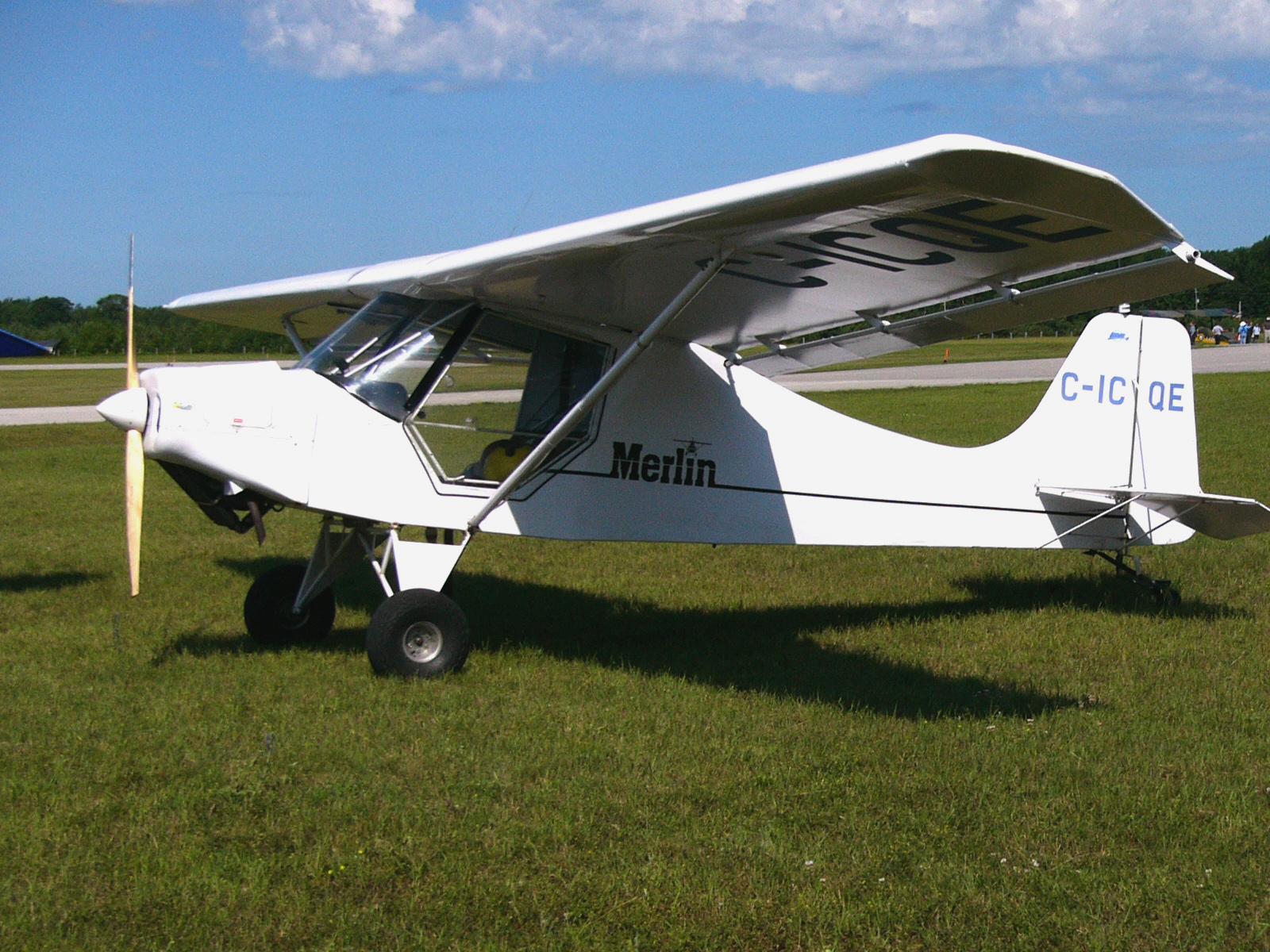
a 1990 model Merlin GT built by Macair Industries

Blue Yonder is the fourth manufacturer of the Merlin design. Companies who have built the Merlin were:

Merlin Manufacturers
Company	Location	Dates	Ownership
Macair Industries	Baldwin, Ontario, Canada	1988-91	John Burch
Malcolm Aircraft	Michigan, USA	1991-92	John Burch
Merlin Aircraft	Michigan, USA	1993-96	
Blue Yonder	Indus, Alberta	1996–present	Wayne Winters
