= Hexatron Engineering =

American aerospace manufacturer

Hexatron Engineering Co., Inc.
- Company type: Privately held company
- Industry: Aerospace
- Founded: 1982
- Headquarters: Salt Lake City, Utah, United States
- Key people: Cy Williams, President and Chief Engineer
- Products: Aircraft engines, aircraft parts
- Website: hexatronengineering.com

Hexatron Engineering Co., Inc. was an American aerospace engineering, aircraft engine and aircraft parts manufacturer based in Salt Lake City, Utah. The company, which was founded in 1982 by Cy Williams, specialized in the design and manufacture of airline aircraft crew seats and also produced an aircraft engine design for homebuilt, ultralight aircraft and the American light-sport aircraft categories.

The company built cabin attendant and crew seats for the McDonnell-Douglas DC-10 and DC-9 aircraft and could modify or manufacture aircraft seats, in accordance with the Technical Standard Orders. The company had also done design and fabrication work for Aerojet, Hercules Inc., Motorola, Lockheed Corporation, Martin Marietta, Stanley Aviation, Texas Instruments and Thiokol.

In 1995 the company decided to develop a line of aircraft engines and designed the Hexadyne P60, a two-cylinder, horizontally-opposed four-stroke powerplant. It is no longer in production.

== Aircraft ==
Summary of aircraft engines built by Hexatron Engineering
Model name	First run	Type
Hexadyne P60	circa 1995	Two cylinder, four-stroke aircraft engine
