= Humbert La Moto Du Ciel =

French ultralight aircraft

La Moto Du Ciel

General information
- Type: Ultralight aircraft
- National origin: France
- Manufacturer: Humbert Aviation
- Status: In production (2012)

The Humbert La Moto Du Ciel (Motorbike of the Sky) is a French ultralight aircraft, designed and produced by Humbert Aviation of Ramonchamp, introduced in the mid-1980s. The aircraft is supplied as a complete ready-to-fly-aircraft.

== Design and development ==
The aircraft complies with the Fédération Aéronautique Internationale microlight rules. It features a strut-braced high-wing, a two-seats-in-tandem open cockpit with a windshield, fixed tricycle landing gear and a single engine in pusher configuration.

The aircraft fuselage is made from welded steel tubing, with the tailboom left uncovered. The flying surfaces are made from aluminium sheet, with a foam core. Its 11.3 m (37.1 ft) span wing has an area of 17.4 m^{2} (187 sq ft). Standard engines available are the 64 hp (48 kW) Rotax 582 two-stroke, the 80 hp (60 kW) Rotax 912UL, the 100 hp (75 kW) Rotax 912ULS four-stroke powerplants. Kits for aerial application are also available.

== Specifications (La Moto Du Ciel) ==
Data from Bayerl and Tacke

General characteristics

- Crew: one
- Capacity: one passenger
- Wingspan: 11.3 m (37 ft 1 in)
- Wing area: 17.4 m^{2} (187 sq ft)
- Empty weight: 240 kg (529 lb)
- Gross weight: 450 kg (992 lb)
- Fuel capacity: 60 litres (13 imp gal; 16 US gal)
- Powerplant: 1 × Rotax 582 twin cylinder, liquid-cooled, two stroke aircraft engine, 48 kW (64 hp)

Performance

- Maximum speed: 150 km/h (93 mph, 81 kn)
- Cruise speed: 120 km/h (75 mph, 65 kn)
- Stall speed: 60 km/h (37 mph, 32 kn)
- Rate of climb: 6 m/s (1,200 ft/min)
- Wing loading: 25.9 kg/m^{2} (5.3 lb/sq ft)
