= Humbert Tétras =

Ultralight aircraft by Humbert Aviation

Tétras
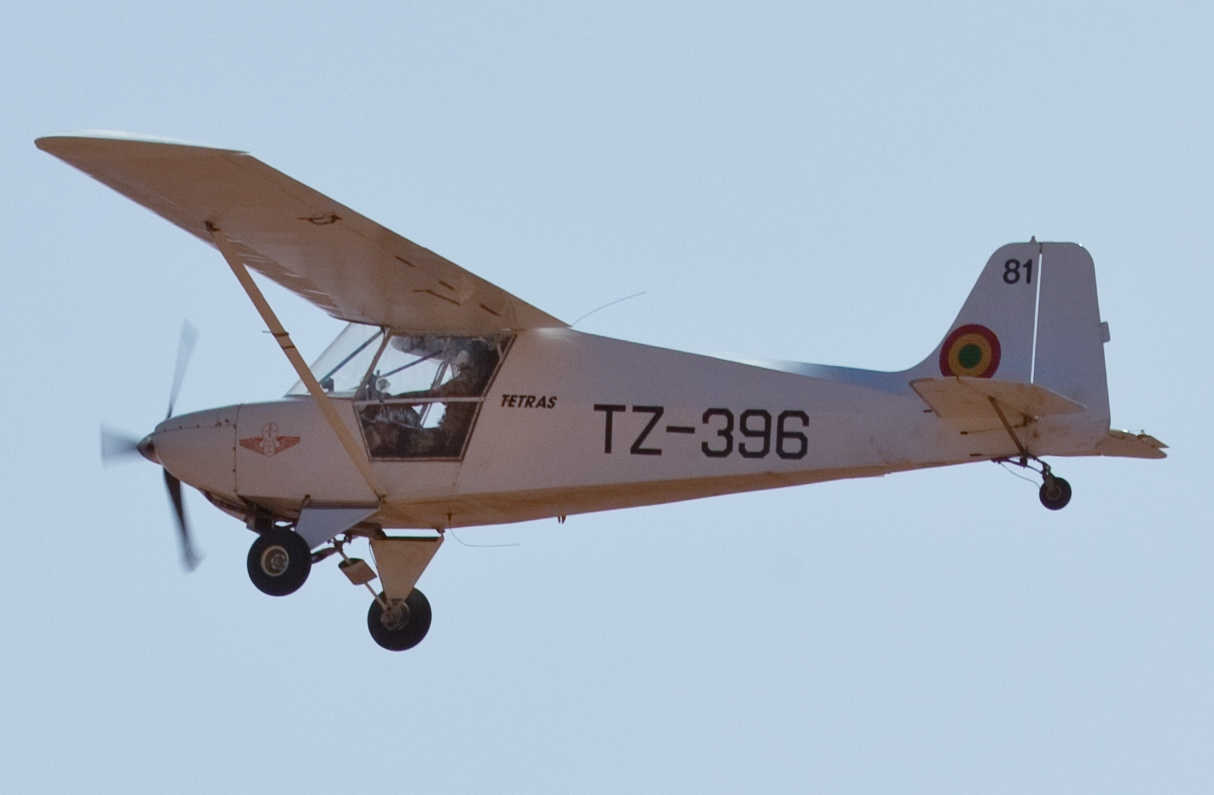
- A Humbert Tétras Mali Air Force

General information
- Type: Two seat ultralight or kit build
- National origin: France
- Manufacturer: Humbert Aviation
- Designer: Humbert Aviation
- Status: In production
- Number built: c.150 by 2010

History
- Manufactured: 1992-present
- Introduction date: 1994
- First flight: c.1992

The Humbert Tétras (English: Grouse) is a French two seat ultralight with a single engine and high wing. Available as a kit or complete aircraft, it has been in production since 1994 by Humbert Aviation of Ramonchamp.

== Design and development ==
The Tétras was first seen in public in 1992 at the RSA Rally at Moulins and marketing began in 1994. It is a conventionally laid out single engine, tractor configuration light aircraft with a high wing, side-by-side seating for two and a fixed undercarriage.

Its straight non tapered wing is a composite structure, with an aluminium frame, Styrofoam filling and fabric covering. The ailerons and three-position flaps are made of aluminium. The wings are braced on each side with a single lift strut to a lower fuselage longeron. The tailplane, mounted at mid-fuselage height, is also strut braced. The fuselage of the Tétras is a steel structure covered with Dacron. Variants with both tricycle and conventional undercarriages, all fixed, have been built. The former arrangement has spring cantilever main legs, the latter has the mainwheels mounted on faired V-strut legs and bungee sprung half axles fixed to a compression frame. Both undercarriage variants have hydraulic brakes. Skis may also be fitted.

The Tétras has been fitted with a variety of engines; originally the 54 kW (72 hp) Humbert-Volkswagen HW 2000 was used. More recently two flat fours from the Rotax range, the 60 kW (80 hp) 912 UL or the 74 kW (98 hp) 912 ULS, have become standard choices.

== Operational history ==
About 150 Tétras appeared on the French ultralight register in October 2010. The French Centre d'Essais en Vol have tested the Tétras for military use, and Niger has used it for insecticide spraying.

== Variants ==
Data from Jane's All the World's Aircraft 2011/12

Tétras A
Initial version

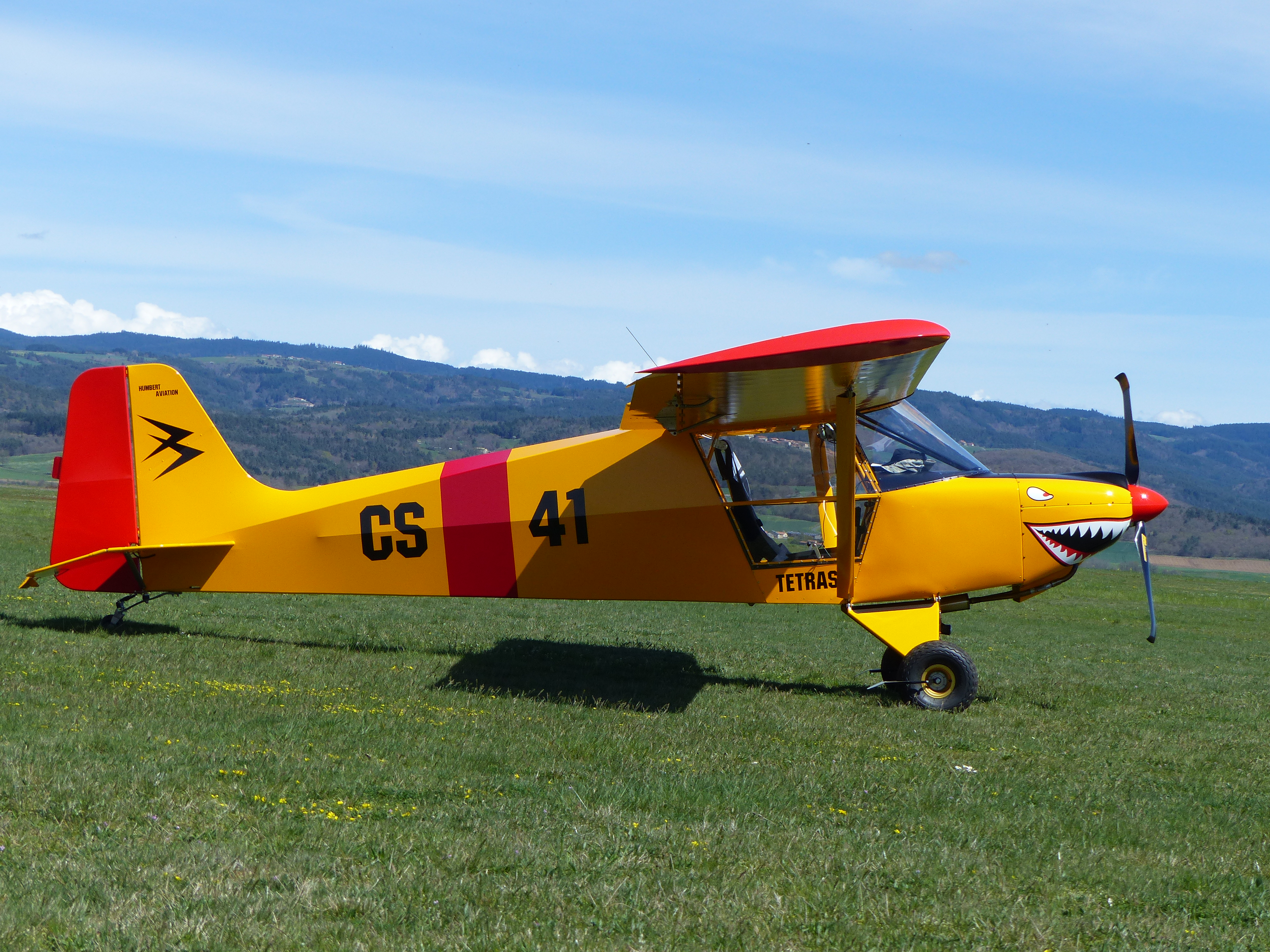
Tetras on parked on display

Tétras B
Standard version, introduced 1998. Early examples had the HW 2000 engine but the 80 hp (60 kW) Rotax 912UL, or optionally the 100 hp (75 kW) Rotax 912ULS engine, is currently (2015) fitted. Currently available.
Tétras BS
912 ULS engine. Currently available.
Tétras CS
Introduced 2007 with a 600 mm (23.6 in) shorter span wing. 912 ULS engine. Marketed 2008-9.
Tétras CT
Tricycle undercarriage version of CS, with 512 UL engine. Marketed 2008-9.
Tétras CTS
As CT with 512 ULS engine. Marketed 2008-9.

== Operators ==
Burkina Faso

- Military of Burkina Faso – Three aircraft were donated by France in October 2012.

Cameroon

- Cameroon Air Force - Eight aircraft (reg. TJX-CS, TJX-CT, TJX-CU, TJX-CV, TJX-CZ, TJX-DA, TJX-DB, TJX-DC)

Guinea

- Military of Guinea – At least five aircraft were donated by France, one crashed on 5 October 2016.

Madagascar

- Malagasy Air Force – Three aircraft (5R-MNQ, 5R-MNR, 5R-MNT)

Mali

- Malian Air Force – Seven aircraft as of 2011.

Niger

- Niger Air Force – Eight Tétras 912SCMs delivered from France around 2008. One crashed in 2010 and another the following year. As of 2018, three aircraft were in service, with the remaining three stored.

== Specifications (Tétras B) ==
Data from Jane's All the World's Aircraft 2011/12

General characteristics

- Capacity: 2
- Length: 6.50 m (21 ft 4 in)
- Wingspan: 10.10 m (33 ft 2 in)
- Height: 2.06 m (6 ft 9 in)
- Wing area: 15.70 m^{2} (169.0 sq ft)
- Airfoil: NACA 23012
- Empty weight: 256 kg (564 lb)
- Max takeoff weight: 450 kg (992 lb) ; where permitted, 495 kg (1,091 lb)
- Fuel capacity: 60 L (15.9 USgal, 13.2 Impgal) standard. Can be increased to 85 L (22.5 USgal, 18.7 Impgal) outside France.
- Powerplant: 1 × Rotax 912 UL flat four, 59.6 kW (79.9 hp)
- Propellers: 2-bladed DUC FC composite, 1.75 m (5 ft 9 in) diameter

Performance

- Maximum speed: 194 km/h (121 mph, 105 kn)
- Cruise speed: 180 km/h (110 mph, 97 kn) at 75% power and 3,048 m (10,000 ft)
- Stall speed: 55 km/h (34 mph, 30 kn) flaps down
- Range: 700 km (430 mi, 380 nmi) with standard fuel capacity
- g limits: +4/-2
- Rate of climb: 7.5 m/s (1,480 ft/min) maximum at sea level

== See also ==
Aircraft of comparable role, configuration, and era

- Blue Yonder Merlin
