= Humbert Aviation =

French aircraft manufacturer

- Company type: Privately held company
- Industry: Aerospace
- Headquarters: Ramonchamp, France
- Products: Microlight aircraft
- Website: www.humbert-aviation.com

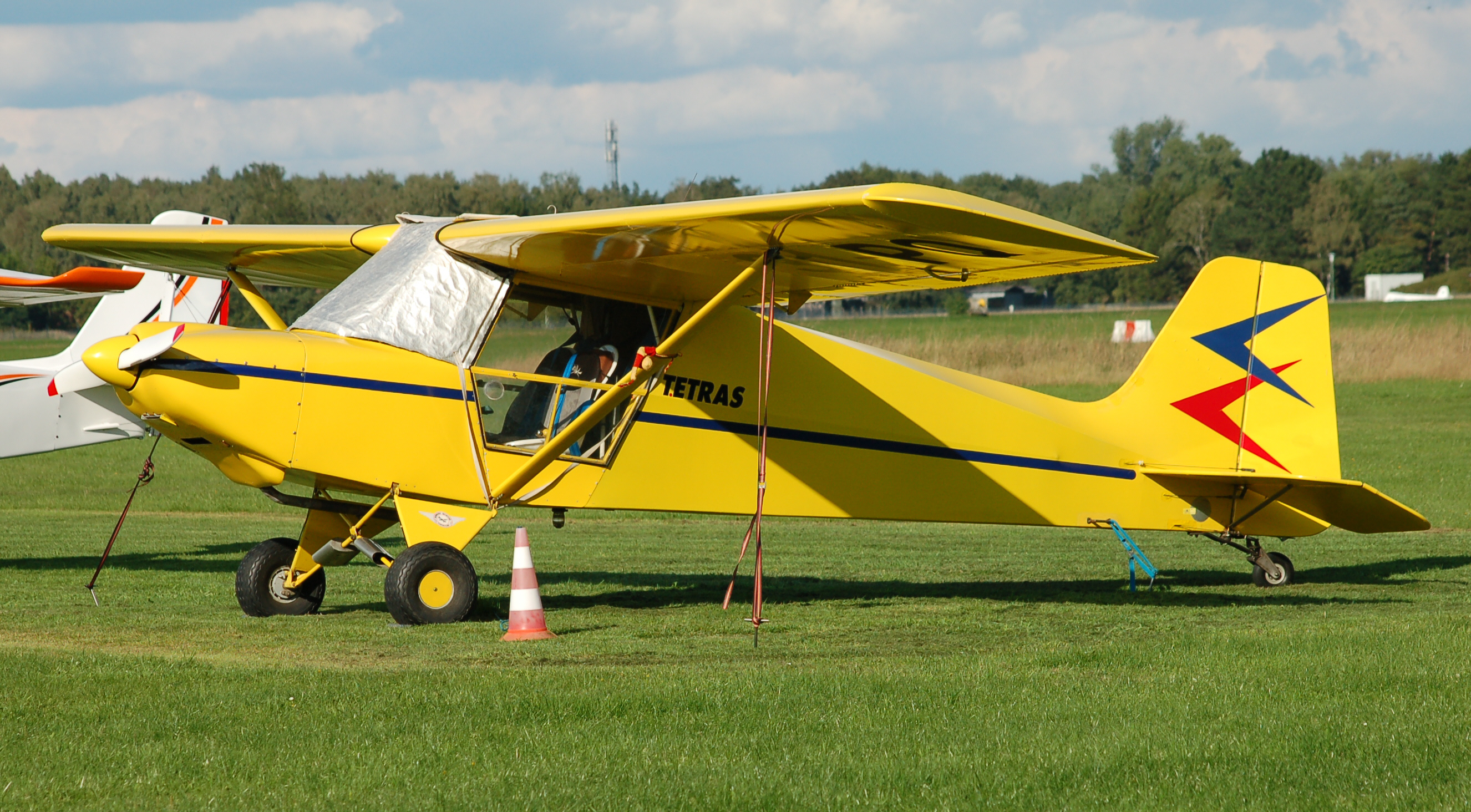
Humbert Tétras

Humbert Aviation is a French aircraft manufacturer based in Ramonchamp. The company specializes in the design and manufacture of microlight aircraft in the form of ready-to-fly aircraft for the Fédération Aéronautique Internationale microlight category.

== Products ==
The company currently markets two designs, the enclosed cockpit, high-wing, two-seats in side-by-side configuration Humbert Tétras and the open cockpit, high-wing, tandem two-seat Humbert La Moto Du Ciel. Both designs have been in production for many years. The aircraft both use welded 4130 steel tube construction with aluminium sheet covered wings and fabric-covered tail surfaces. The fuselage of the Tétras is also fabric-covered.

== Aircraft ==
Summary of aircraft built by Humbert Aviation
Model name	First flight	Number built	Type
Humbert Tétras	1992	150 (2010)	Enclosed cockpit, high-wing, two-seat microlight
Humbert La Moto Du Ciel			Open cockpit, high-wing, two-seat microlight
