= Hexadyne P60 =

American aircraft engine

- Type: Aircraft engine
- National origin: United States
- Manufacturer: Hexatron Engineering Co., Inc.

The Hexadyne P60 is an American aircraft engine, designed and produced by Hexatron Engineering of Salt Lake City, Utah for use in ultralight and homebuilt aircraft.

== Design and development ==
The engine is a twin cylinder four-stroke, horizontally-opposed, 800 cc (48.8 cu in), air-cooled, gasoline engine design, with a mechanical gearbox spur gear reduction drive with a reduction ratio of 2.5:1. It employs electronic ignition and produces 60 hp (45 kW) continuous at 5750 rpm. The engine management system is a six-sensor computer and the engine is optimized to drive a 68 to 70 in (173 to 178 cm) propeller.

The engine was initially displayed at AirVenture, Oshkosh, Wisconsin in 2001.

== Applications ==
- Blue Yonder Merlin

== Specifications (Hexadyne P60) ==
Data from World Directory of Leisure Aviation 2011-12 and manufacturer

=== General characteristics ===
- Type: Twin cylinder, four-stroke aircraft engine
- Bore: 92 mm (3.6 in)
- Displacement: 800 cc (48.8 cu in)
- Length: 596 mm (23.5 in)
- Width: 406 mm (16.0 in)
- Height: 450 mm (17.7 in)
- Dry weight: 45 kg (99.2 lb)

=== Components ===
- Fuel system: fuel injection
- Fuel type: gasoline
- Cooling system: air
- Reduction gear: mechanical gearbox spur gear reduction drive, reduction ratio of 2.5:1

=== Performance ===
- Power output: 60 hp (45 kW) at 5750 rpm
- Compression ratio: 9.0:1
- Fuel consumption: 3 U.S. gallons (11 L; 2.5 imp gal) per hour

== See also ==
Related lists

- List of aircraft engines
