= Mathews Petit Breezy =

American ultralight aircraft

General information
- Type: Ultralight aircraft
- National origin: United States
- Designer: Lyle Mathews
- Status: Plans still available

The Mathews Petit Breezy is an American ultralight aircraft that was designed by Lyle Mathews in conjunction with his partners Al Petit and Kindall and Wink Turner. It was made available in the form of plans for amateur construction. The aircraft was inspired by the larger RLU-1 Breezy.

== Design and development ==
The Petit Breezy was designed to comply with the US FAR 103 Ultralight Vehicles rules, including the category's maximum empty weight of 254 lb (115 kg). The aircraft has a standard empty weight of 246 lb (112 kg). It features a strut-braced high-wing, a single-seat, open cockpit, tricycle landing gear and a single engine in pusher configuration.

The aircraft is made from riveted aluminum tubing, with the wings and tail covered in doped aircraft fabric. Its 30 ft (9.1 m) span wing is supported by V-struts with jury struts. The wing features half-span ailerons. The tail is a strut-braced cruciform tail. The fuselage consists of an aluminum keel tube that runs from the nose wheel to the tail. The pilot is accommodated on an open seat mounted to the main keel tube and a second seat can be fitted under the wing.

In 2011 plans were still available for the design from the Vintage Ultralight Association. Construction time from the plans is estimated at 200–300 hours

== Specifications (Petit Breezy) ==
Data from Cliche and the Virtual Ultralight Museum

General characteristics

- Crew: one
- Length: 17 ft (5.2 m)
- Wingspan: 30 ft (9.1 m)
- Height: 5 ft 4 in (1.63 m)
- Wing area: 150 sq ft (14 m^{2})
- Empty weight: 246 lb (112 kg)
- Gross weight: 500 lb (227 kg)
- Fuel capacity: 5 U.S. gallons (19 L; 4.2 imp gal)
- Powerplant: 1 × Kawasaki 340 twin cylinder snowmobile engine, 30 hp (22 kW)

Performance

- Cruise speed: 40 mph (64 km/h, 35 kn)
- Stall speed: 22 mph (35 km/h, 19 kn)
- Maximum glide ratio: 6:1
- Rate of climb: 400 ft/min (2.0 m/s)

== See also ==
Related development

- RLU-1 Breezy

Aircraft of comparable role, configuration, and era

- Blue Yonder EZ Flyer
- Harper Lil Breezy
