= RLU-1 Breezy =

American homebuilt aircraft

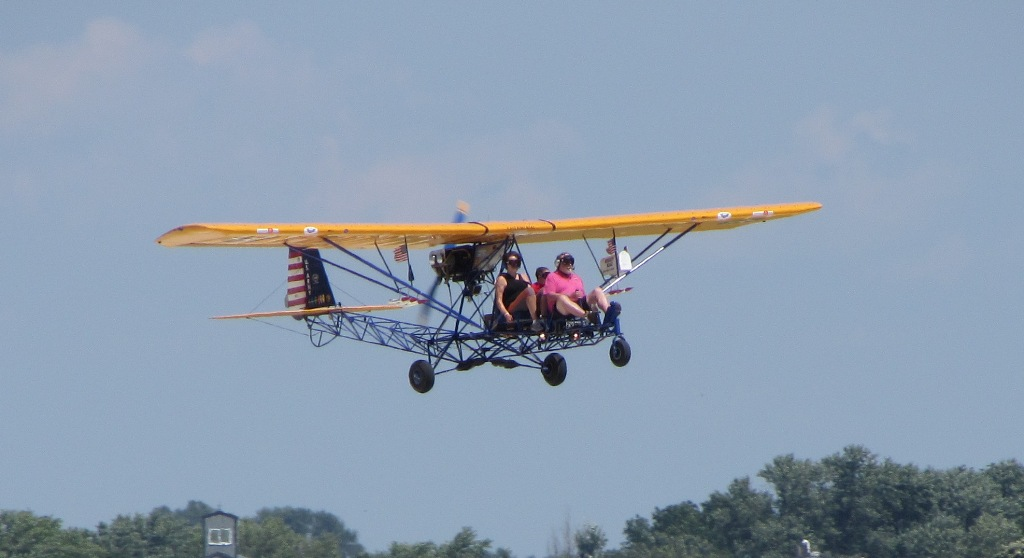

General information
- Type: Homebuilt aircraft
- National origin: United States of America
- Manufacturer: RLU
- Designer: Charles Roloff, Carl Unger, and Bob Liposky
- Number built: About 1000

History
- First flight: August 7, 1964

The RLU-1 Breezy is a homebuilt aircraft known for its "no cockpit" high wing pusher configuration. It is designed to seat the pilot and passenger with a maximum unobstructed view.

== Design and development ==
Designed and built by Charles Roloff, Robert Liposky and Carl Unger, the original Breezy used a modified set of Piper PA-12 wings. Wings from the Piper PA-14, Piper PA-18, Piper J-3, Piper J-4, Piper J-5, or Cessna 172 can also be used on the design. It first flew on August 7, 1964.

== Operational history ==
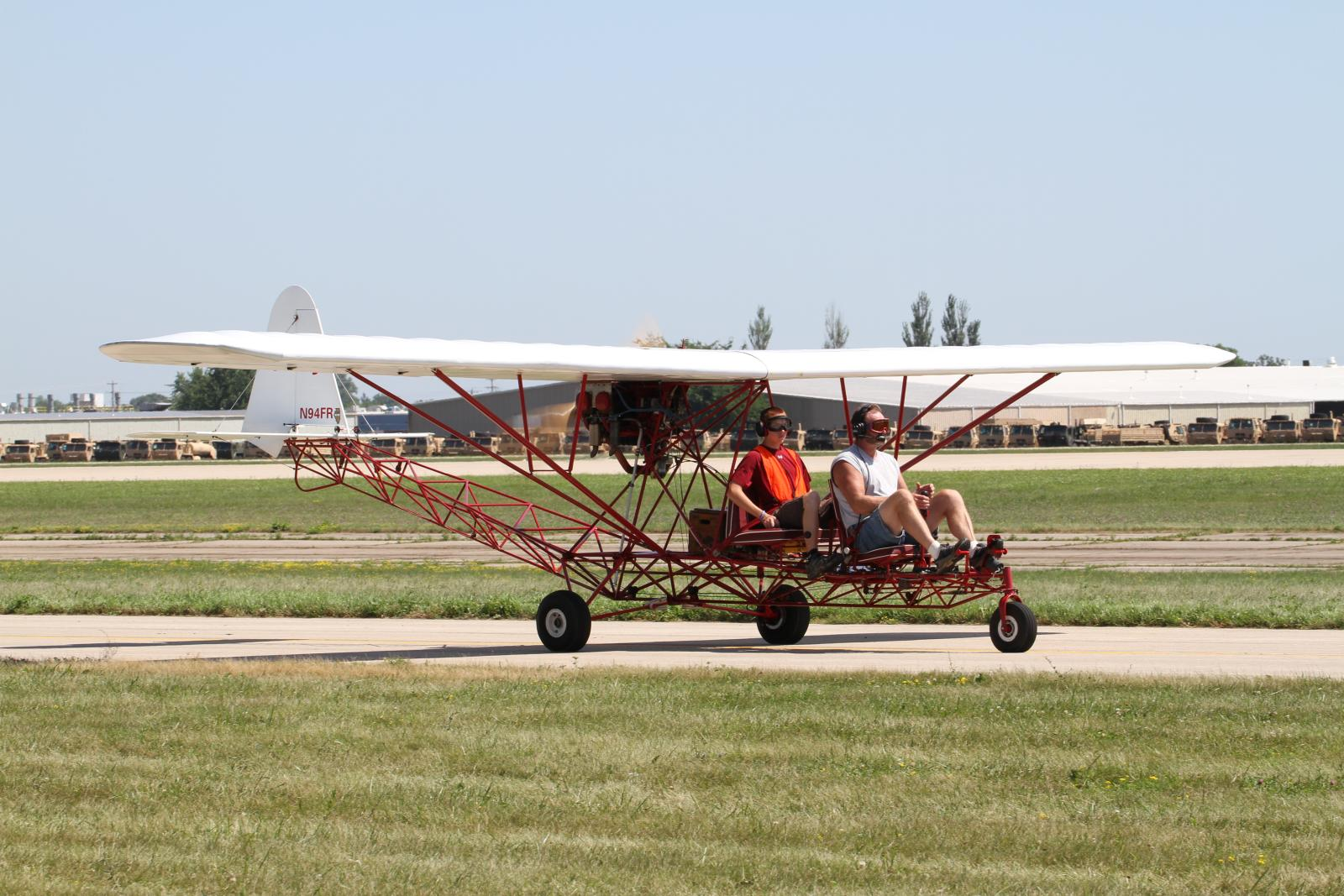
RLU-1 Breezy

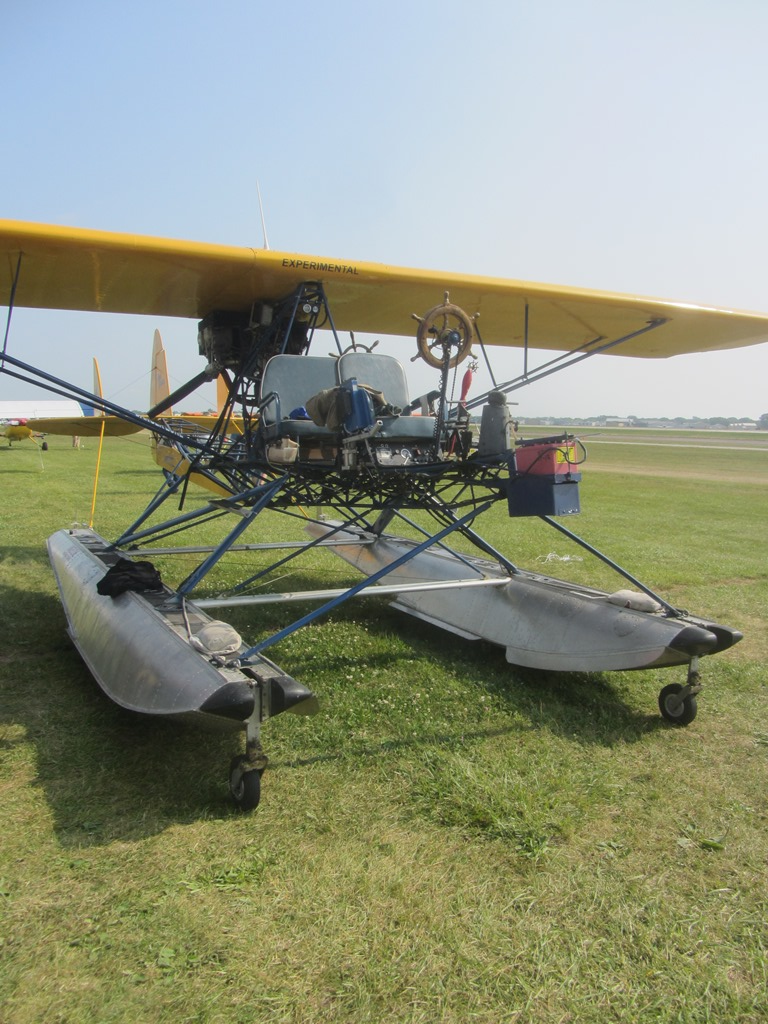
Amphibious Breezy

Designer and pilot Carl Unger flew thousands of passengers for free in his Breezy prototype. The aircraft is now part of the EAA AirVenture Museum collection.

At the 2014 EAA AirVenture Oshkosh there was a series of special events to celebrate the 50th anniversary of the design, including a fly-in of Breezys.

== Variants ==
Dawes Breezy
Variant with amphibious floats

== Specifications (Breezy) ==
Data from Sport Aviation

General characteristics

- Capacity: 3
- Length: 22 ft 6 in (6.86 m)
- Wingspan: 33 ft (10 m)
- Height: 8 ft 6 in (2.59 m)
- Wing area: 165 sq ft (15.3 m^{2})
- Fuel capacity: 10 U.S. gallons (38 L; 8.3 imp gal)
- Powerplant: 1 × Continental C-90 , 90 hp (67 kW)
- Range: 120 nmi (140 mi, 230 km)

== See also ==
Aircraft of comparable role, configuration, and era

- Aerosport Woody Pusher
- Blue Yonder EZ Flyer
- Harper Lil Breezy
- Mathews Petit Breezy
