= Harper Lil Breezy =

American ultralight airplane

Lil Breezy
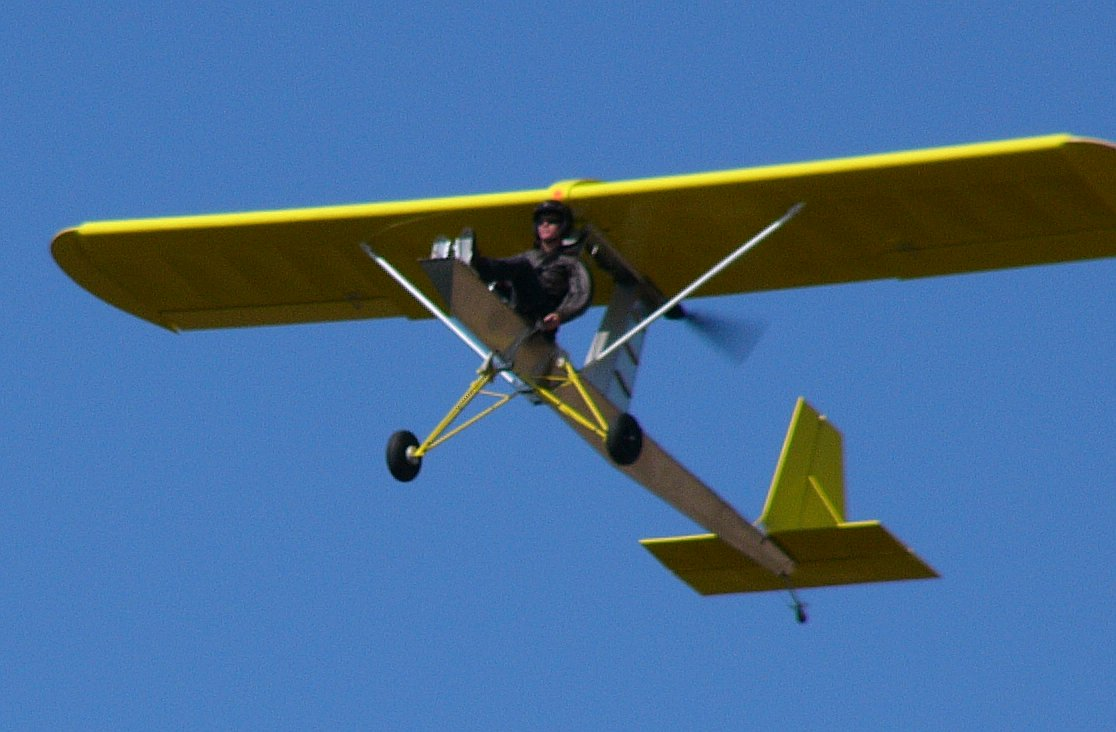
- Harper Lil Breezy- B single seater

General information
- Type: Ultralight aircraft and Light-sport aircraft
- National origin: United States
- Manufacturer: Harper Aircraft
- Designer: Jack Harper
- Status: Production completed (2012)

The Harper Lil Breezy is an American ultralight and light-sport aircraft that was designed by Jack Harper and produced by Harper Aircraft of Jacksonville, Florida. While the company was in business the aircraft was supplied as a kit for amateur construction or as a complete ready-to-fly-aircraft.

== Design and development ==
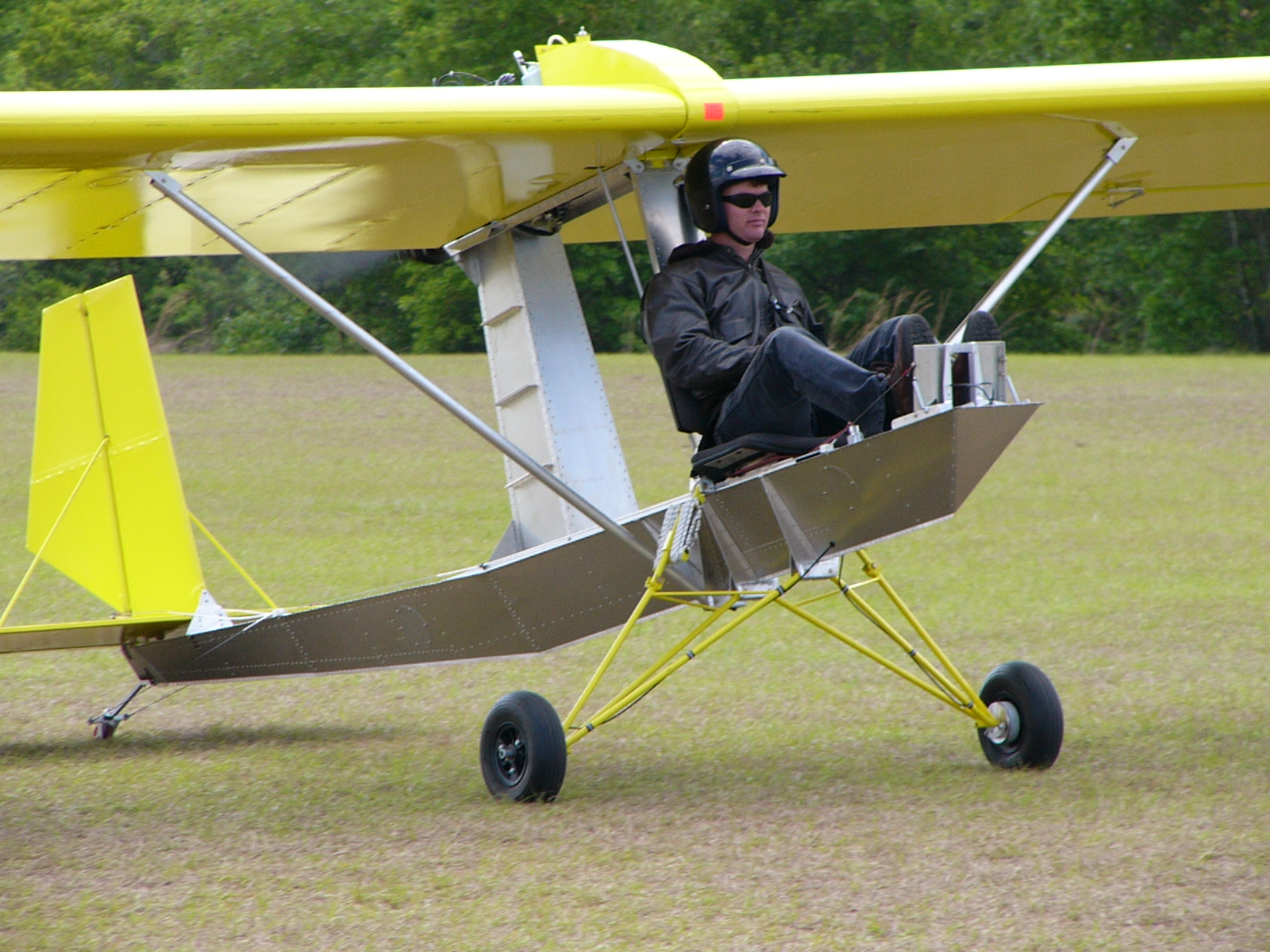
Harper Lil Breezy-B single seater at Sun 'n Fun 2004

The Lil Breezy was inspired by the similar RLU-1 Breezy and designed to comply with the United States FAR Part 103 Ultralight Vehicles rules in its single place version and also the US light-sport aircraft rules. It features a strut-braced high-wing, a single-seat or optionally a two-seats-in-tandem open cockpit without a windshield, fixed conventional landing gear and a single engine in pusher configuration.

The early Lil Breezy-A is made from welded steel tubing with its flying surfaces covered in doped aircraft fabric. The later "B" model is of aluminium construction, with flying surfaces covered with Dacron sailcloth. Standard engines available included the 50 hp (37 kW) Rotax 503 two-stroke powerplant.

== Variants ==
Lil Breezy-A
Initial model, available as a kit, with a steel tube fuselage.
Lil Breezy-B
Second model, available as a kit or later as a complete aircraft only, with aluminium construction.

== Specifications (Lil Breezy-B) ==
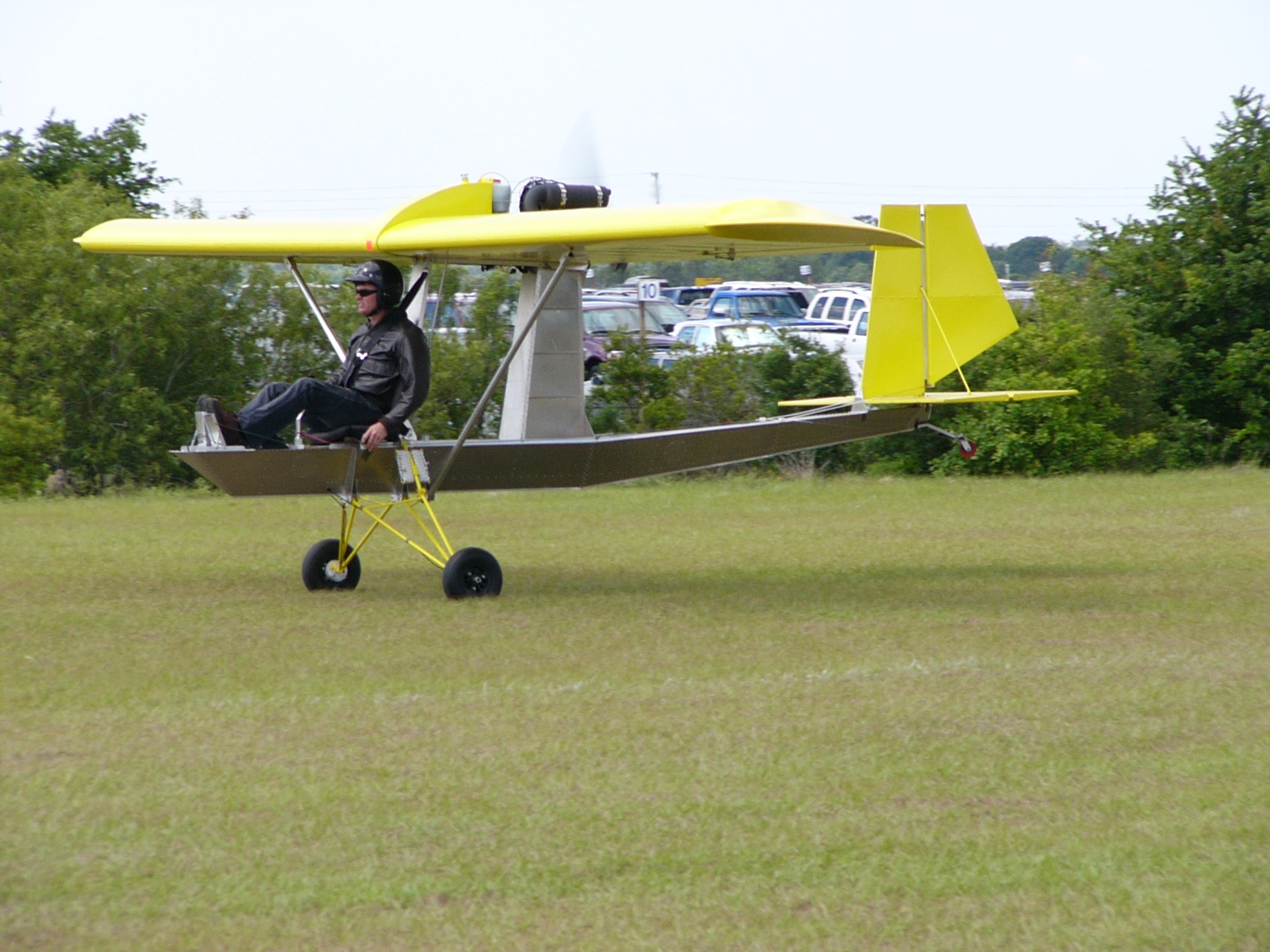
Harper Lil Breezy-B single seater at Sun 'n Fun 2004

Data from Bayerl

General characteristics

- Crew: one
- Capacity: one passenger
- Empty weight: 441 lb (200 kg)
- Gross weight: 677 lb (307 kg)
- Powerplant: 1 × Rotax 503 twin cylinder, air-cooled, two stroke aircraft engine, 50 hp (37 kW)

Performance

- Maximum speed: 65 mph (105 km/h, 57 kn)
- Cruise speed: 50 mph (80 km/h, 43 kn)
- Stall speed: 28 mph (45 km/h, 24 kn)

== See also ==
- Blue Yonder EZ Flyer
- Mathews Petit Breezy
