= Blue Yonder EZ Fun Flyer =

Canadian ultralight aircraft

EZ Fun Flyer

General information
- Type: Ultralight aircraft
- National origin: Canada
- Manufacturer: Blue Yonder Aviation
- Designer: Wayne Winters
- Status: In production
- Number built: 1

History
- Introduction date: 2011
- Developed from: Ultraflight Lazair

The Blue Yonder EZ Fun Flyer is a Canadian twin-engined ultralight aircraft that was designed by Wayne Winters and is produced by Blue Yonder Aviation of Indus, Alberta. The aircraft is supplied as a kit for amateur construction.

== Design and development ==
Even though it is a Canadian design, the aircraft was designed to comply with the US FAR 103 Ultralight Vehicles rules, including the category's maximum empty weight of 254 lb (115 kg). The aircraft has a standard empty weight of 251 lb (114 kg). It features a strut-braced high-wing, inverted V-tail, a single-seat, open cockpit, conventional landing gear and twin engines in tractor configuration. The EZ Fun Flyer closely resembles the Ultraflight Lazair in configuration and dimensions.

The aircraft structure is made from aluminum tubing, with foam wing ribs. Its 34 ft (10.4 m) span wing is supported by a single lift strut per side. The engines are Radne Raket 120 single cylinder, 120cc, air-cooled, two stroke powered hang glider powerplants of 14 hp (10 kW) each, which give a cruise speed of 50 mph (80 km/h) and a rate of climb of 400 ft/min (2.0 m/s).

The construction time from the supplied kit is estimated by the designer at 160 hours.

== Operational history ==
Only one example has been registered in Canada.

== Specifications (EZ Fun Flyer) ==
Data from KitPlanes

General characteristics

- Crew: one
- Length: 15 ft (4.6 m)
- Wingspan: 34 ft (10 m)
- Wing area: 146 sq ft (13.6 m^{2})
- Empty weight: 251 lb (114 kg)
- Gross weight: 600 lb (272 kg)
- Fuel capacity: 6 U.S. gallons (23 L; 5.0 imp gal)
- Powerplant: 2 × Radne Raket 120 single-cylinder, two-stroke, 120cc, air-cooled powered hang glider engines, 14 hp (10 kW) each

Performance

- Cruise speed: 50 mph (80 km/h, 43 kn)
- Stall speed: 17 mph (27 km/h, 15 kn)
- Range: 100 mi (160 km, 87 nmi)
- Rate of climb: 400 ft/min (2.0 m/s)
