= Blue Yonder Merlin =

Canadian monoplane aircraft

Merlin series
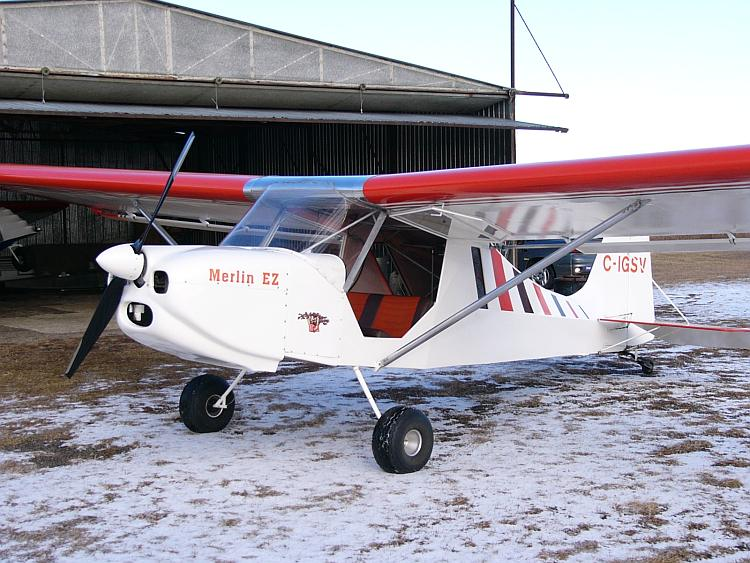
- Blue Yonder Merlin EZ

General information
- Type: Ultralight personal use and trainer aircraft
- Manufacturer: Blue Yonder Aviation
- Designer: John Burch
- Number built: 308 (2011)

History
- Manufactured: 1987-present
- Introduction date: 1987
- First flight: 1987

The Blue Yonder Merlin is a Canadian-designed and -built two-seat, high-wing monoplane with taildragger undercarriage. It can be built as a basic ultra-light, an advanced ultra-light or amateur-built aircraft.

== Design and development ==
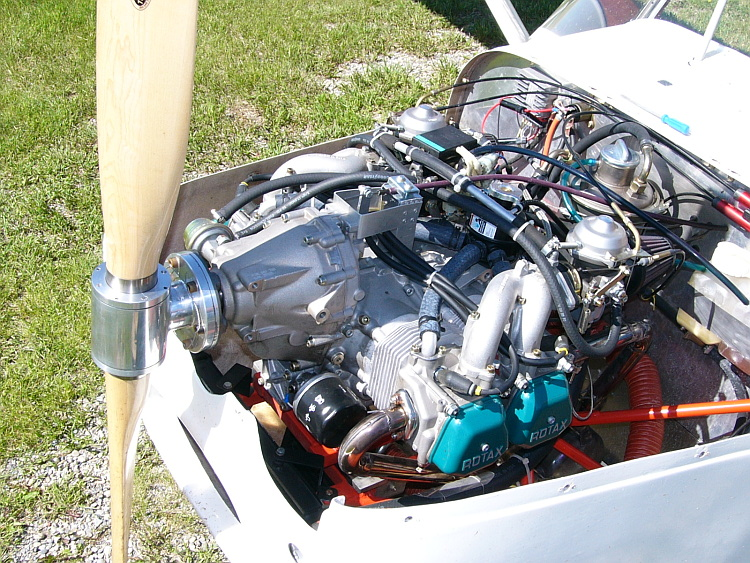
Rotax 912ULS 100 hp installation in a Blue Yonder Merlin EZ

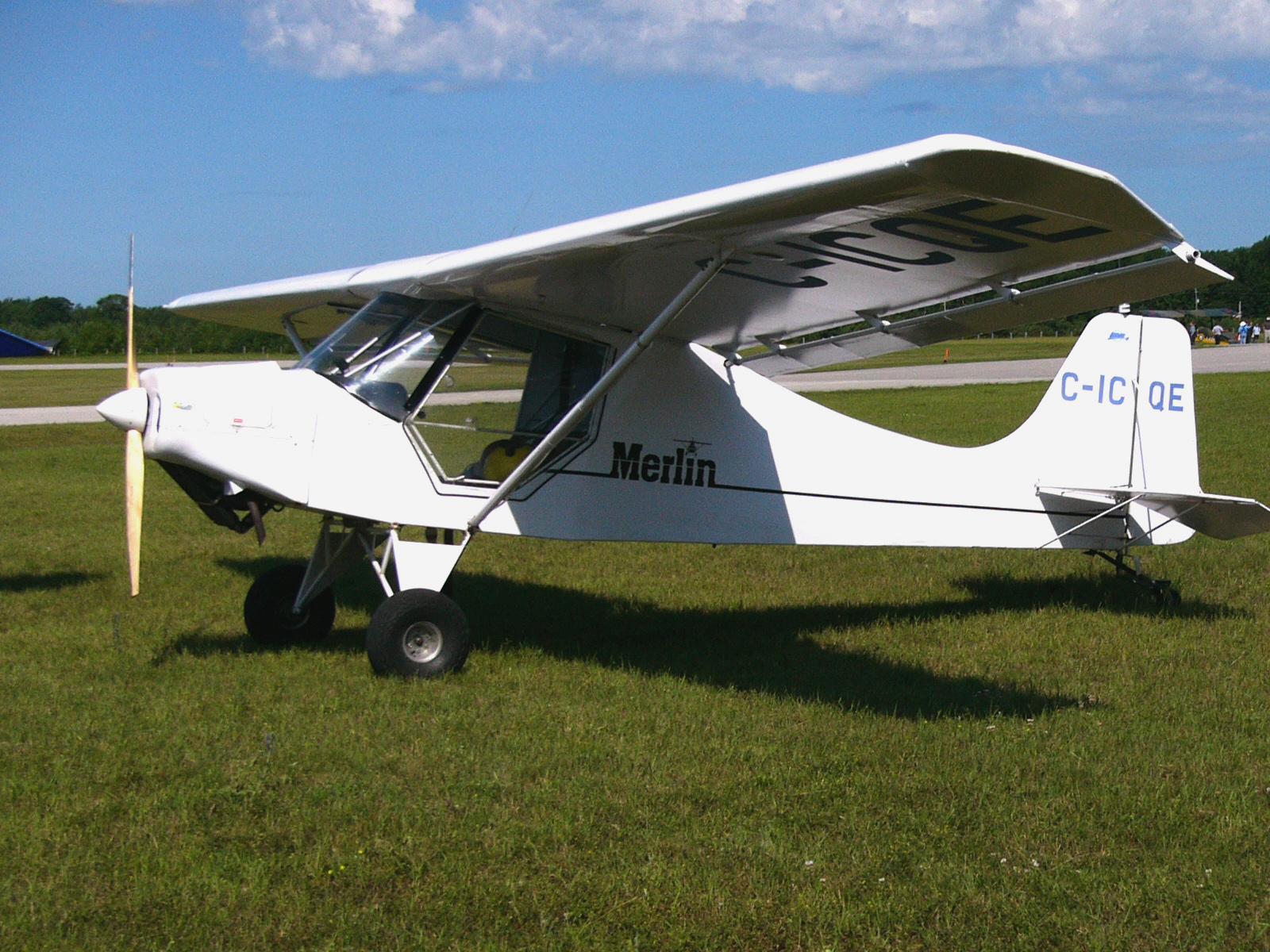
1990 model Macair Merlin GT

The Merlin was designed in 1986 by John Burch, who intended to use it in his flight training school. Burch was disappointed with the early ultralights available, in particular their inability to take off and land in crosswinds. The aircraft wing was inspired by the Lazair's wing and used the same aluminum "D" cell and foam rib construction techniques and constant-tapered wing planform. The first example flew in 1987.

The Merlin won the Pilot's Choice Award as Best Ultralight at the Aircraft Sport Expo in 1988.

Burch formed Macair Industries in Baldwin, Ontario to produce the aircraft. Initially there were two versions: the Merlin M50 powered by the 50 hp (37 kW) Rotax 503 two-stroke powerplant and the Merlin GT and Sport 65 version powered by the 64 hp (48 kW) Rotax 532 and later 582. The 100 hp (75 kW) Honda-based CAM 100 engine was also available as an option.

In 1991 Burch moved production of the Merlin to Michigan, USA under a new company name, Malcolm Aircraft. Within a short time that company went out of business and the Merlin was picked up by a new company in 1993 operating under the name of Merlin Aircraft who marketed the Merlin GT. After three years the company ceased business and the rights to the design were acquired by Blue Yonder Aviation of Indus, Alberta who continue to produce kits. Marketing in the United States was conducted by Aerocomp (now Comp Air) for some time, but this arrangement has been ended.

Blue Yonder's current model is the Merlin EZ which has an option of engines: the Rotax 582 of 64 hp (48 kW), the Rotax 912UL with 80 hp (60 kW) and the 912ULS with 100 hp (75 kW). The Rotax 618 two-stroke powerplant of 74 hp (55 kW) was an option until that engine was discontinued by Rotax. The Merlin was used as the testbed aircraft for development of the Hexadyne P60 engine.

The Merlin EZ uses the same foam-rib construction as previous models, but with a constant-chord wing with a Clark Y airfoil replacing the previously tapered wing. The fuselage is of 4130 welded steel tube construction, covered in aircraft fabric. The factory estimates build times at 350–450 hours of labour.

=== Merlin Manufacturers ===
Blue Yonder is the fourth manufacturer of the Merlin design. Companies who have built the Merlin were:

Merlin Manufacturers
Company	Location	Dates	Ownership
Macair Industries	Baldwin, Ontario, Canada	1988-91	John Burch
Malcolm Aircraft	Michigan, USA	1991-92	John Burch
Merlin Aircraft	Michigan, USA	1993-96	
Blue Yonder	Indus, Alberta, Canada	1996–present	Wayne Winters

== Variants ==
Merlin M50
Initial model, tapered wings, powered by a 50 hp (37 kW) Rotax 503 engine
Merlin GT/Sport 65
Initial model, tapered wings, powered by a 64 hp (48 kW) Rotax 532 and later by a Rotax 582 or 100 hp (75 kW) CAM 100 engine
Merlin EZ
Current model, constant chord wings, powered by a 64 hp (48 kW) Rotax 582, 74 hp (55 kW) Rotax 618, 80 hp (60 kW) Rotax 912UL, 100 hp (75 kW) Rotax 912ULS
Merlin TG
Tricycle landing gear model, constant chord wings, powered by a 64 hp (48 kW) Rotax 582, 80 hp (60 kW) Rotax 912UL, 100 hp (75 kW) Rotax 912ULS

== Specifications (Merlin EZ Rotax 912ULS) ==
Data from Merlin magic revisited and Merlin EZ

General characteristics

- Crew: two
- Length: 23 ft 0 in (7.01 m)
- Wingspan: 35 ft 6 in (10.82 m)
- Height: 7 ft 0 in (2.13 m)
- Wing area: 235 sq ft (21.8 m^{2})
- Empty weight: 700 lb (318 kg)
- Max takeoff weight: 1,400 lb (635 kg)
- Powerplant: 1 × Rotax 912S 4-cyl. air-cooled horizontally opposed four-stroke piston engine, 100 hp (75 kW)

Performance

- Maximum speed: 100 kn (120 mph, 190 km/h)
- Cruise speed: 96 kn (110 mph, 180 km/h)
- Rate of climb: 1,400 ft/min (7.1 m/s)
- Wing loading: 8.75 lb/sq ft (42.7 kg/m^{2})

== See also ==
Related development

- Blue Yonder EZ Flyer

Aircraft of comparable role, configuration, and era

- Humbert Tétras
