= Indus, Alberta =

Indus
- Hamlet
- Location of Indus in Alberta
- Coordinates: 50°54′57″N 113°46′48″W
- Country: Canada
- Province: Alberta
- Census division: No. 6
- Municipal district: Rocky View County

Area (2021)
  - Land: 0.78 km^{2} (0.30 sq mi)

Population (2021)
  - Total: 36
  - Density: 46.2/km^{2} (120/sq mi)
- Time zone: UTC−06:00 (Alberta Time)

Indus is a hamlet in southern Alberta, Canada under the jurisdiction of Rocky View County. It is home to the Bill Herron Arena Indus is located approximately 6.1 km (3.8 mi) east of the City of Calgary's eastern limits and 24 km (15 mi) southeast of Downtown Calgary on Highway 791, 0.6 km (0.4 mi) north of Highway 22X.

Indus is home to a recreation complex that serves Rocky View County and the southeast communities in the Calgary region of which is made up of a mix which includes multi-generational Canadian farm families and acreage owners.

Indus's community hockey program is young, having been founded in the early 1970s, but in a relatively short time has developed a strong program that has seen many of its participating athletes move to advanced levels including junior hockey, Canadian university & USA college NCAA, as well as professional hockey. Notable players include Michael Stewart and Bart Vanstaalduinen who both played NCAA hockey for the Michigan State Spartans of Michigan State University. Stewart was drafted 13th overall in the 1992 NHL entry draft by the New York Rangers, and finished his career playing in Austria and Germany, where he now coaches. Vanstaalduinen played at MSU from 1992 to 1996, then finished his career in Europe and the ECHL.

The name 'Indus' was suggested in 1914 to the Canadian Pacific Railway by Dr. J.M. Fulton, was the shortened version of "industry". When the rail line reached this area, Dr. Fulton envisioned industrial growth for the region.

== Demographics ==
In the 2021 Census of Population conducted by Statistics Canada, Indus had a population of 36 living in 15 of its 15 total private dwellings, a change of −14.3% from its 2016 population of 42. With a land area of 0.78 km^{2} (0.30 sq mi), it had a population density of 46.2/km^{2} (119.5/sq mi) in 2021.

The population of Indus according to the 2018 municipal census conducted by Rocky View County is 32, a decrease from its 2013 municipal census population count of 36.

As a designated place in the 2016 Census of Population conducted by Statistics Canada, Indus had a population of 62 living in 24 of its 24 total private dwellings, a change of 37.8% from its 2011 population of 45. With a land area of 1.09 km^{2} (0.42 sq mi), it had a population density of 56.9/km^{2} (147.3/sq mi) in 2016.

== Education ==
Indus School was opened in 1952 and provides education to students in kindergarten through grade 8, it is a part of the Rocky View School District. Indus School is located as geographically the most southern school inside of the Rocky View School District and services students from Rocky View County, Langdon, Chestermere and Calgary (mainly from the Calgary's Southeast communities of Auburn Bay, Copperfield, Mahogany, McKenzie Towne, New Brighton and Seton).

Construction on an expansion and major renovations to the then old and dated Indus School would start with foundation work in early 2019, and construction of the main building would go underway during May 2020. By August 2021 most of the project had been complete, but had officially concluded during the autumn months of 2021. The project would include a multi-use "maker space" which functions as an art studio, wood and metal shop, and robotics studio. Alongside this the project included a redesigned learning commons with designs inspired by the rural setting the school is located in. As well major quality of life features for students were done for students in the school with larger locker rooms and a shared workspace called "The Living Room" which has garage doors that can open up into nearby classrooms.

Following the opening of a high school in nearby Langdon, the Rocky View School District made the decision in 2023 to decrease the amount of grade levels serviced by Indus School by removing grade 9, making it now kindergarten to grade 8.

== See also ==
- List of communities in Alberta
- List of hamlets in Alberta
