= Airdrome Nieuport 17 =

American fighter repica

General information
- Type: Amateur-built aircraft
- National origin: United States
- Manufacturer: Airdrome Aeroplanes
- Status: In production (2011)
- Number built: 9 (2011)

History
- Developed from: Nieuport 17

The Airdrome Nieuport 17 is an American amateur-built aircraft, designed and produced by Airdrome Aeroplanes, of Holden, Missouri. The aircraft is supplied as a kit for amateur construction.

The aircraft is a full-scale replica of the First World War French Nieuport 17 fighter. The replica is built from modern materials and powered by modern engines.

== Design and development ==
The Airdrome Nieuport 17 features a "V"-strut sesquiplane layout, a single-seat open cockpit, fixed conventional landing gear and a single engine in tractor configuration.

The aircraft is made from bolted-together aluminum tubing, with its flying surfaces covered in doped aircraft fabric. The kit is made up of twelve sub-kits. The Airdrome Nieuport 17 has a wingspan of 26.8 ft (8.2 m) and a wing area of 180 sq ft (17 m^{2}). The standard engine used is the 102 hp (76 kW) four stroke Volkswagen air-cooled engine. Building time from the factory-supplied kit is estimated at 400 hours by the manufacturer. The aircraft can be constructed as a Nieuport 17 or as the more refined Nieuport 17bis.

== Operational history ==
Nine examples had been completed by December 2011.

== Specifications (Nieuport 17) ==
Data from Kitplanes

General characteristics

- Crew: one
- Length: 19.5 ft (5.9 m)
- Wingspan: 26.8 ft (8.2 m)
- Wing area: 180 sq ft (17 m^{2})
- Empty weight: 532 lb (241 kg)
- Gross weight: 872 lb (396 kg)
- Fuel capacity: 14 U.S. gallons (53 L; 12 imp gal)
- Powerplant: 1 × Volkswagen air-cooled engine four cylinder, air-cooled, four stroke aircraft engine, 102 hp (76 kW)
- Propellers: 2-bladed wooden

Performance

- Cruise speed: 89 mph (143 km/h, 77 kn)
- Stall speed: 40 mph (64 km/h, 35 kn)
- Range: 370 mi (600 km, 320 nmi)
- Rate of climb: 950 ft/min (4.8 m/s)
- Wing loading: 4.8 lb/sq ft (23 kg/m^{2})

== See also ==
- Circa Reproductions Nieuport
