= Airdrome Nieuport 24 =

American fighter replica

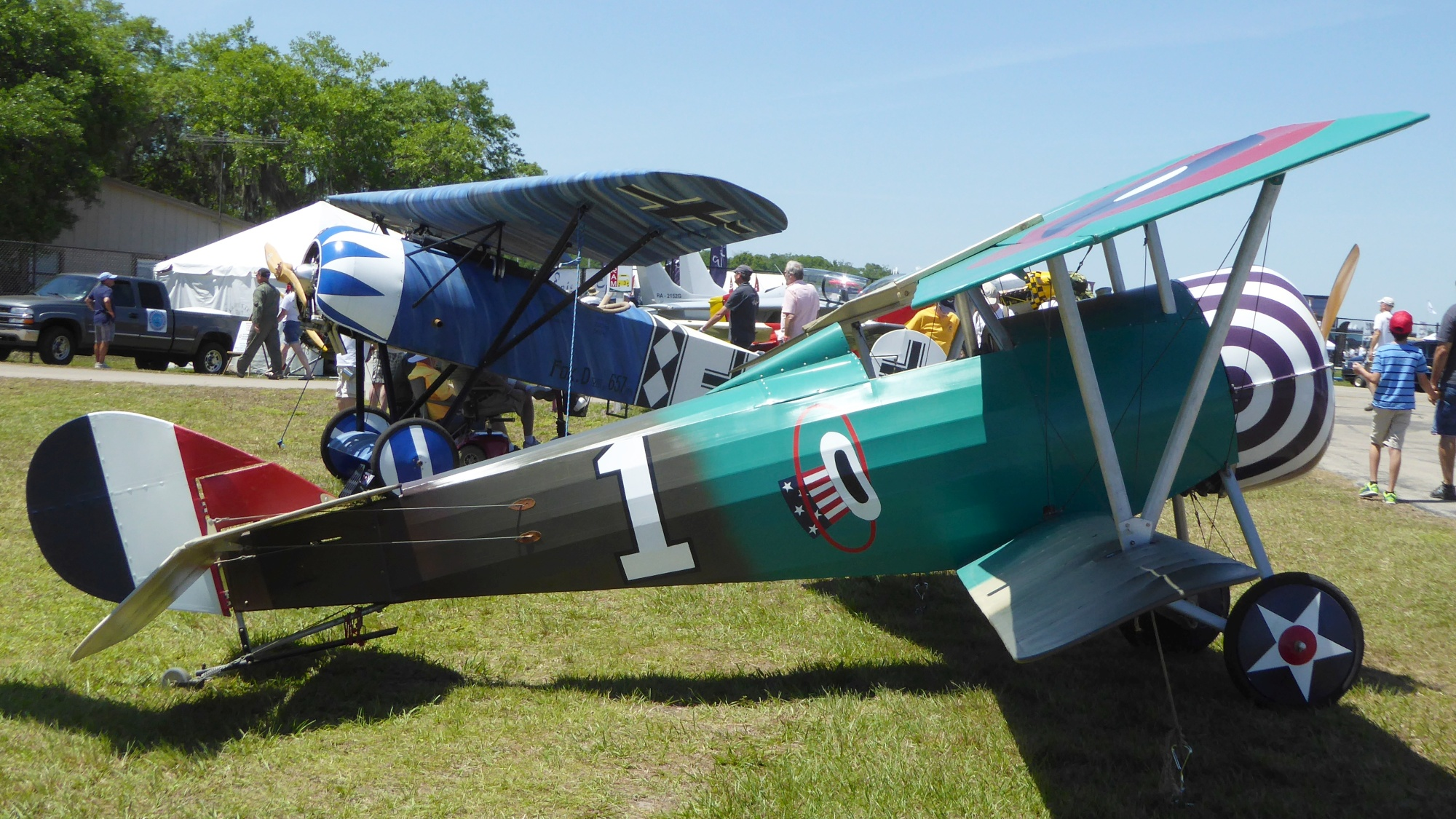

General information
- Type: Amateur-built aircraft
- National origin: United States
- Manufacturer: Airdrome Aeroplanes
- Status: In production (2015)
- Number built: 12 (2011)

The Airdrome Nieuport 24 is an American amateur-built aircraft, designed and produced by Airdrome Aeroplanes, of Holden, Missouri. The aircraft is supplied as a kit for amateur construction and is available in two versions, the Nieuport 24 and Nieuport 24 bis.

The aircraft is a full-sized replica of the First World War French Nieuport 24 fighter, built from modern materials and powered by modern engines.

== Design and development ==
The Airdrome Nieuport 24 features a strut-braced sesquiplane layout, a single-seat open cockpit, fixed conventional landing gear and a single engine in tractor configuration.

The aircraft is made from bolted-together aluminum tubing, with its flying surfaces covered in doped aircraft fabric. The kit is made up of twelve sub-kits. The Airdrome Nieuport 24 has a wingspan of 26.9 ft (8.2 m) and a wing area of 180 sq ft (17 m^{2}). It can be equipped with engines ranging from 85 to 110 hp (63 to 82 kW). The standard engine is the 110 hp (82 kW) Hirth F30 two stroke engine, with a Volkswagen air-cooled engine four-stroke or a 110 hp (82 kW) Rotec R2800 four stroke radial engine optional. Building time from the factory-supplied kit is estimated at 400 hours by the manufacturer.

The replica performs better than the original Nieuport 24 on the same installed power, because modern materials result in a much lighter aircraft.

== Operational history ==
Twelve examples had been completed by December 2011.

== Specifications (Airdrome Nieuport 24) ==
Data from Bayerl, Kitplanes and Airdrome Aeroplanes

General characteristics

- Crew: one
- Length: 19.5 ft (5.9 m)
- Wingspan: 26.9 ft (8.2 m)
- Wing area: 180 sq ft (17 m^{2})
- Empty weight: 496 lb (225 kg)
- Gross weight: 836 lb (379 kg)
- Fuel capacity: 14 U.S. gallons (53 L; 12 imp gal)
- Powerplant: 1 × Hirth F-30 four cylinder, air-cooled, two stroke aircraft engine, 110 hp (82 kW)

Performance

- Maximum speed: 95 mph (153 km/h, 83 kn)
- Cruise speed: 83 mph (134 km/h, 72 kn)
- Stall speed: 35 mph (56 km/h, 30 kn)
- Range: 370 mi (600 km, 320 nmi)
- Rate of climb: 850 ft/min (4.3 m/s)
- Wing loading: 4.6 lb/sq ft (22 kg/m^{2})
