= Airdrome Fokker D-VI =

American fighter replica

General information
- Type: Amateur-built aircraft
- National origin: United States
- Manufacturer: Airdrome Aeroplanes
- Status: In production (2011)
- Number built: 14 (2011)

History
- Developed from: Fokker D.VI

The Airdrome Fokker D-VI is an American amateur-built aircraft, designed and produced by Airdrome Aeroplanes, of Holden, Missouri. The aircraft is supplied as a kit for amateur construction.

The aircraft is a 3/4 scale replica of the First World War German Fokker D.VI fighter, built from modern materials and powered by modern engines.

== Design and development ==
The Airdrome Fokker D-VI features a strut-braced biplane layout, a single-seat open cockpit, fixed conventional landing gear and a single engine in tractor configuration.

The aircraft is made from bolted-together aluminum tubing, with its flying surfaces covered in doped aircraft fabric. The kit is made up of twelve sub-kits. The Airdrome Fokker D-VI has a wingspan of 17.9 ft (5.5 m) and a wing area of 110 sq ft (10 m^{2}). It can be equipped with engines ranging from 46 to 65 hp (34 to 48 kW). The standard engine is the 50 hp (37 kW) Rotax 503 two stroke engine, with a Volkswagen air-cooled engine optional. Building time from the factory-supplied kit is estimated at 400 hours by the manufacturer.

== Operational history ==
Fourteen examples had been completed by December 2011.

== Specifications (Fokker D-VI) ==
Data from Kitplanes and Airdrome Aeroplanes

General characteristics

- Crew: one
- Length: 15 ft (4.6 m)
- Wingspan: 17.9 ft (5.5 m)
- Wing area: 110 sq ft (10 m^{2})
- Empty weight: 297 lb (135 kg)
- Gross weight: 568 lb (258 kg)
- Fuel capacity: 14 U.S. gallons (53 L; 12 imp gal)
- Powerplant: 1 × Rotax 503 two cylinder, air-cooled, two stroke aircraft engine, 50 hp (37 kW)
- Propellers: 2-bladed wooden

Performance

- Maximum speed: 78 mph (126 km/h, 68 kn)
- Cruise speed: 73 mph (117 km/h, 63 kn)
- Stall speed: 30 mph (48 km/h, 26 kn)
- Range: 120 mi (190 km, 100 nmi)
- Rate of climb: 750 ft/min (3.8 m/s)
- Wing loading: 5.2 lb/sq ft (25 kg/m^{2})
