= Airdrome Nieuport 11 =

American homebuilt aircraft

General information
- Type: Amateur-built aircraft
- National origin: United States
- Manufacturer: Airdrome Aeroplanes
- Status: In production (2011)
- Number built: 1 (2011)

History
- Developed from: Nieuport 11

The Airdrome Nieuport 11 is an American amateur-built aircraft, designed and produced by Airdrome Aeroplanes, of Holden, Missouri. The aircraft is supplied as a kit for amateur construction.

The aircraft is a 7/8 scale replica of the First World War French Nieuport 11 Bebe fighter, a key aircraft in ending the Fokker Scourge. The replica is built from modern materials and powered by modern engines.

== Design and development ==
The Airdrome Nieuport 11 features a "V"-strut sesquiplane layout, a single-seat open cockpit, fixed conventional landing gear and a single engine in tractor configuration.

The aircraft is made from bolted-together aluminum tubing, with its flying surfaces covered in doped aircraft fabric. The kit is made up of twelve sub-kits. The Airdrome Nieuport 11 has a wingspan of 23.6 ft (7.2 m) and a wing area of 110 sq ft (10 m^{2}). It can be equipped with engines ranging from 52 to 80 hp (39 to 60 kW). The standard engine used is the 52 hp (39 kW) four stroke Volkswagen air-cooled engine. Building time from the factory-supplied kit is estimated at 375 hours by the manufacturer.

== Operational history ==
Only one example had been completed by December 2011.

== Specifications (Nieuport 11) ==
Data from Kitplanes

General characteristics

- Crew: one
- Length: 13.6 ft (4.1 m)
- Wingspan: 23.6 ft (7.2 m)
- Wing area: 110 sq ft (10 m^{2})
- Empty weight: 380 lb (172 kg)
- Gross weight: 720 lb (327 kg)
- Fuel capacity: 8 U.S. gallons (30 L; 6.7 imp gal)
- Powerplant: 1 × Volkswagen air-cooled engine four cylinder, air-cooled, four stroke aircraft engine, 52 hp (39 kW)
- Propellers: 2-bladed wooden

Performance

- Cruise speed: 74 mph (119 km/h, 64 kn)
- Stall speed: 34 mph (55 km/h, 30 kn)
- Range: 150 mi (240 km, 130 nmi)
- Rate of climb: 700 ft/min (3.6 m/s)
- Wing loading: 6.6 lb/sq ft (32 kg/m^{2})

== See also ==
- Circa Reproductions Nieuport
