= Airdrome Fokker DR-1 =

American fighter replica

General information
- Type: Amateur-built aircraft
- National origin: United States
- Manufacturer: Airdrome Aeroplanes
- Status: In production (2011)
- Number built: 27 (3/4 scale, 2011); 5 (full scale, 2011)

History
- Developed from: Fokker Dr.I

The Airdrome Fokker DR-1 is an American amateur-built aircraft, designed and produced by Airdrome Aeroplanes, of Holden, Missouri. The aircraft is supplied as a kit for amateur construction and is available in two versions, a full-sized and a 3/4 scale replica.

The aircraft is a replica of the First World War German Fokker Dr.I Triplane, built from modern materials and powered with modern engines.

== Design and development ==
The Airdrome Fokker DR-1 features a strut-braced triplane layout, a single-seat open cockpit, fixed conventional landing gear and a single engine in tractor configuration.

The aircraft is made from bolted-together aluminum tubing, with its flying surfaces covered in doped aircraft fabric. Both aircraft kits are made up of twelve sub-kits. The dimensions and the engines recommended vary depending on which variant is being constructed. Building time for either version is estimated at 400 hours by the manufacturer.

== Variants ==
Airdrome Fokker DR-1 Triplane - Full Scale Replica
This version has a standard empty weight of 534 lb (242 kg), a wingspan of 24 ft (7.3 m) and is powered by a 102 hp (76 kW) Volkswagen air-cooled engine. Five had been completed by the end of 2011.
Airdrome Fokker DR-1 Triplane - 3/4 Scale Replica
This version has a standard empty weight of 341 lb (155 kg), a wingspan of 17.9 ft (5.5 m) and is powered by a 64 hp (48 kW) Rotax 582 two-stroke or a 65 hp (48 kW) Volkswagen air-cooled engine. Twenty-seven had been completed by the end of 2011.

== Specifications (3/4 scale DR-1) ==
Data from Bayerl, Kitplanes and Airdrome Aeroplanes

General characteristics

- Crew: one
- Length: 15 ft (4.6 m)
- Wingspan: 17 ft 11 in (5.41 m)
- Wing area: 150 sq ft (14 m^{2})
- Empty weight: 341 lb (155 kg)
- Gross weight: 583 lb (264 kg)
- Fuel capacity: 12 U.S. gallons (45 L; 10.0 imp gal)
- Powerplant: 1 × Rotax 582 twin cylinder, liquid-cooled, two stroke aircraft engine, 64 hp (48 kW)

Performance

- Maximum speed: 78 mph (126 km/h, 68 kn)
- Cruise speed: 64 mph (103 km/h, 56 kn)
- Stall speed: 34 mph (55 km/h, 30 kn)
- Range: 70 mi (110 km, 61 nmi)
- Rate of climb: 950 ft/min (4.8 m/s)
- Wing loading: 3.9 lb/sq ft (18.9 kg/m^{2})
