= Coccinelle (disambiguation) =

Coccinelle was a French transsexual actress and entertainer.

Coccinelle may also refer to:

== Transportation ==
- SIPA S.1000 Coccinelle, a French-built light civil utility aircraft of the 1950s
- Pottier P.130 Coccinelle, a French light aircraft originating from one designed, but not built, in the 1960s
- Volkswagen Beetle (French nickname), a German car (1938–2003)
  - Volkswagen Coccinelle, the model Volkswagen Beetle (A5) (2011-on)
- Citroën Coccinelle, a project of the Citroën 2CV

== Other uses ==
- Coccinelle (software), a framework for refactoring of C source code
- Coccinelle Association, an LGBTQI+ association in Ecuador, named after the French actress

== See also ==
- Coccinellidae, the ladybug or ladybird beetle family (French: coccinelle)
