= Airdrome Morane Saulnier L =

American fighter replica

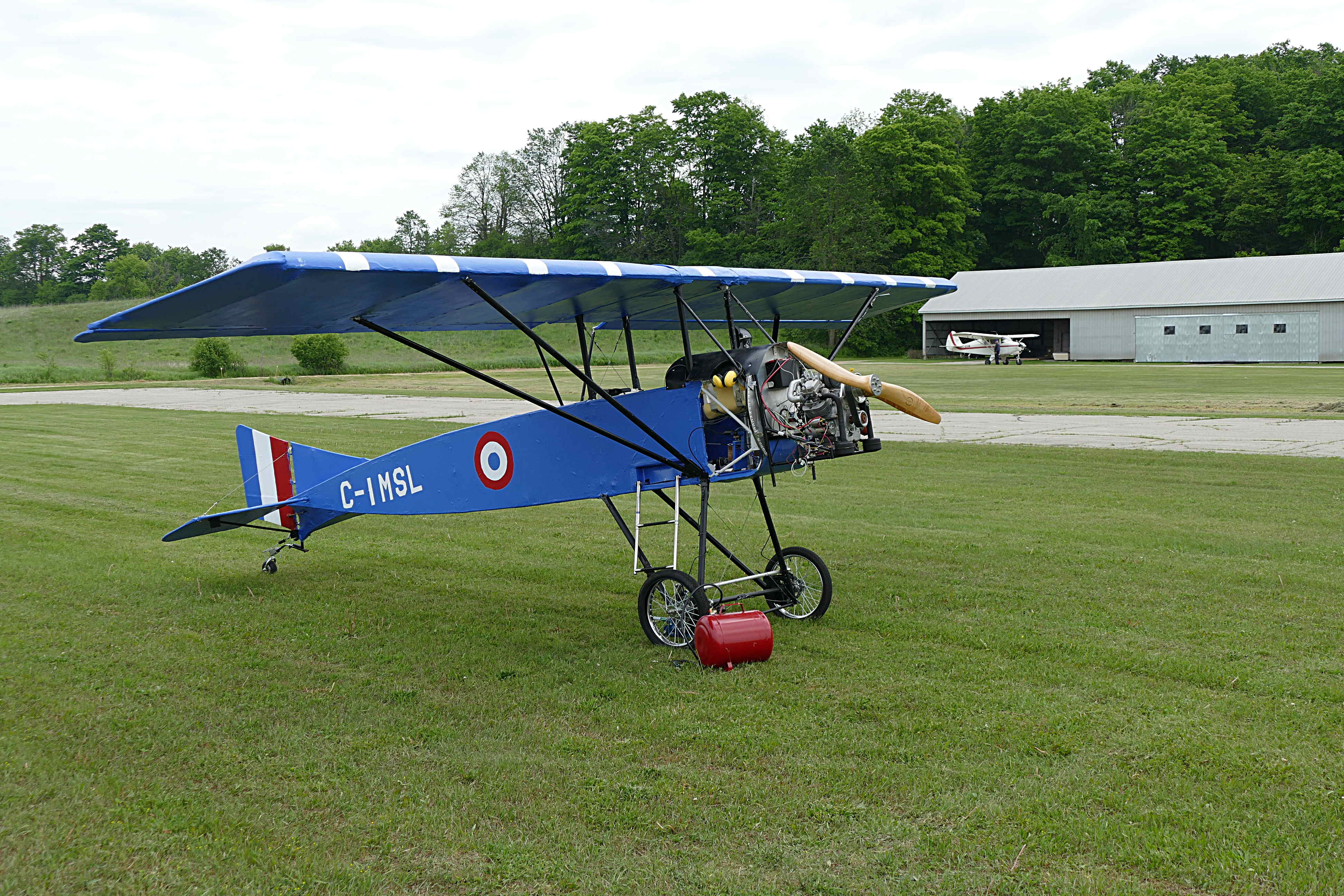

General information
- Type: Amateur-built aircraft
- National origin: United States
- Manufacturer: Airdrome Aeroplanes
- Status: In production (2011)
- Number built: 2 (2011)

History
- Developed from: Morane-Saulnier L

The Airdrome Morane Saulnier L is an American amateur-built aircraft, designed and produced by Airdrome Aeroplanes, of Holden, Missouri. The aircraft is supplied as a kit for amateur construction.

The aircraft is a 3/4 scale replica of the First World War French Morane-Saulnier L fighter, first flown by French aviator Roland Garros to shoot down an enemy aircraft with a forward-firing machine gun in March 1915. The replica is built from modern materials and powered by modern engines.

== Design and development ==
The Airdrome Morane Saulnier L features a parasol wing monoplane layout, a single-seat open cockpit, fixed conventional landing gear and a single engine in tractor configuration.

The aircraft is made from bolted-together aluminum tubing, with its flying surfaces covered in doped aircraft fabric. The kit is made up of twelve sub-kits. The Airdrome Morane Saulnier L has a wingspan of 26 ft (7.9 m) and a wing area of 120 sq ft (11 m^{2}). It can be equipped with engines ranging from 35 to 52 hp (26 to 39 kW). The standard engine used is the 35 hp (26 kW) Valley Engineering Big Twin four stroke engine. Building time from the factory-supplied kit is estimated at 300 hours by the manufacturer.

== Operational history ==
Two examples had been completed by December 2011.

== Specifications (Morane Saulnier L) ==
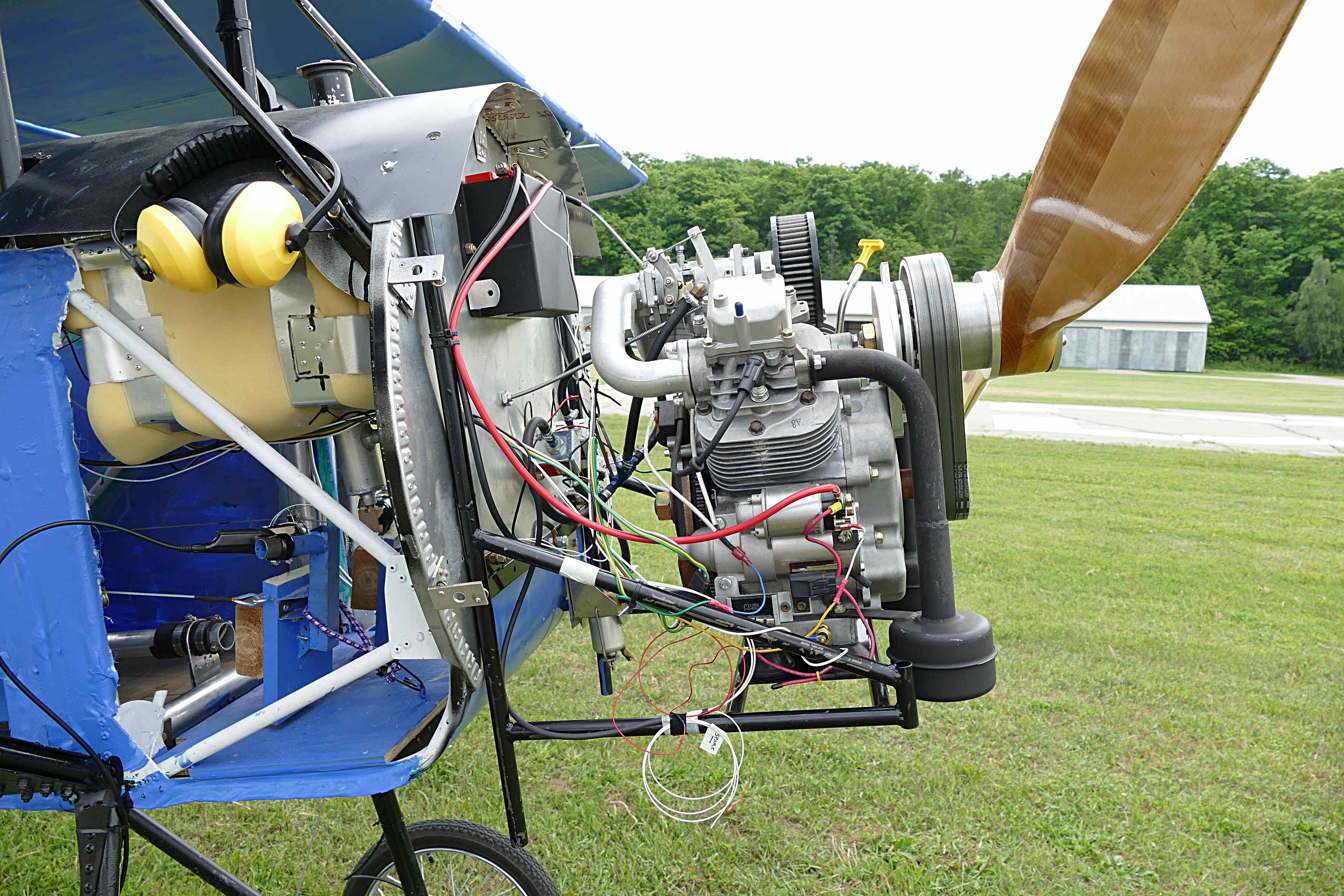
Engine detail

Data from Kitplanes

General characteristics

- Crew: one
- Length: 17 ft (5.2 m)
- Wingspan: 26 ft (7.9 m)
- Wing area: 120 sq ft (11 m^{2})
- Empty weight: 356 lb (161 kg)
- Gross weight: 640 lb (290 kg)
- Fuel capacity: 5 U.S. gallons (19 L; 4.2 imp gal)
- Powerplant: 1 × Valley Engineering Big Twin two cylinder, air-cooled, four stroke aircraft engine, 35 hp (26 kW)
- Propellers: 2-bladed wooden

Performance

- Cruise speed: 63 mph (101 km/h, 55 kn)
- Stall speed: 31 mph (50 km/h, 27 kn)
- Range: 300 mi (480 km, 260 nmi)
- Rate of climb: 650 ft/min (3.3 m/s)
- Wing loading: 5.3 lb/sq ft (26 kg/m^{2})
