= Airdrome DeHavilland DH-2 =

American homebuilt aircraft

General information
- Type: Amateur-built aircraft
- National origin: United States
- Manufacturer: Airdrome Aeroplanes
- Status: In production (2011)
- Number built: 2 (2011)

History
- Developed from: Airco DH.2

The Airdrome DeHavilland DH-2 is an American amateur-built aircraft, designed and produced by Airdrome Aeroplanes, of Holden, Missouri. The aircraft is supplied as a kit for amateur construction.

The aircraft is an 80% scale replica of the First World War British Airco DH.2 fighter, used to counter the Fokker Scourge of 1915. The replica is built from modern materials and powered by modern engines.

== Design and development ==
The Airdrome DeHavilland DH-2 features a strut-braced biplane layout, a single-seat open cockpit, fixed conventional landing gear and a single engine in pusher configuration.

The aircraft is made from steel and aluminum, with its flying surfaces covered in doped aircraft fabric. The Airdrome DeHavilland DH-2 has a wingspan of 22.8 ft (6.9 m) and a wing area of 145 sq ft (13.5 m^{2}). It can be equipped with engines ranging from 40 to 52 hp (30 to 39 kW). The standard engine used is the 40 hp (30 kW) Valley Engineering Big Twin four stroke engine. Building time from the factory-supplied kit is estimated at 350 hours by the manufacturer.

== Operational history ==
Two examples had been completed by December 2011.

== Specifications (DeHavilland DH-2) ==
Data from Kitplanes

General characteristics

- Crew: one
- Length: 15 ft (4.6 m)
- Wingspan: 22.8 ft (6.9 m)
- Wing area: 145 sq ft (13.5 m^{2})
- Empty weight: 354 lb (161 kg)
- Gross weight: 596 lb (270 kg)
- Fuel capacity: 10 U.S. gallons (38 L; 8.3 imp gal)
- Powerplant: 1 × Valley Engineering Big Twin two cylinder, air-cooled, four stroke aircraft engine, 40 hp (30 kW)
- Propellers: 2-bladed wooden

Performance

- Cruise speed: 61 mph (98 km/h, 53 kn)
- Stall speed: 29 mph (47 km/h, 25 kn)
- Range: 120 mi (190 km, 100 nmi)
- Rate of climb: 615 ft/min (3.12 m/s)
- Wing loading: 4.1 lb/sq ft (20 kg/m^{2})
