= Airdrome Taube =

American fighter replica

General information
- Type: Amateur-built aircraft
- National origin: United States
- Manufacturer: Airdrome Aeroplanes
- Status: In production (2011)
- Number built: 1 (2011)

History
- Developed from: Etrich Taube

The Airdrome Taube (English: Dove) is an American amateur-built aircraft, designed and produced by Airdrome Aeroplanes, of Holden, Missouri. The aircraft is supplied as a kit for amateur construction.

The aircraft is a 3/4 scale replica of the First World War German Etrich Taube scout/observation/bomber, built from modern materials and powered by modern engines.

== Design and development ==
The Airdrome Taube features a mid-wing cable-braced monoplane layout with an inverted "V" kingpost, a two-seat open cockpit, fixed conventional landing gear and a single engine in tractor configuration.

The aircraft is made from bolted-together aluminum tubing, with its flying surfaces covered in doped aircraft fabric. The Airdrome Taube has a wingspan of 27 ft (8.2 m) and a wing area of 170 sq ft (16 m^{2}). The standard engine is a 105 hp (78 kW) Volkswagen air-cooled engine four stroke engine. Building time from the factory-supplied kit is estimated at 500 hours by the manufacturer.

== Operational history ==
One example had been completed by December 2011.

== Specifications (Taube) ==
Data from Kitplanes

General characteristics

- Crew: one
- Length: 17 ft (5.2 m)
- Wingspan: 30 ft (9.1 m)
- Wing area: 170 sq ft (16 m^{2})
- Empty weight: 720 lb (327 kg)
- Gross weight: 1,145 lb (519 kg)
- Fuel capacity: 10 U.S. gallons (38 L; 8.3 imp gal)
- Powerplant: 1 × Volkswagen air-cooled engine four cylinder, air-cooled, four stroke automotive conversion, 105 hp (78 kW)
- Propellers: 2-bladed wooden

Performance

- Cruise speed: 65 mph (105 km/h, 56 kn)
- Stall speed: 35 mph (56 km/h, 30 kn)
- Range: 200 mi (320 km, 170 nmi)
- Rate of climb: 700 ft/min (3.6 m/s)
- Wing loading: 6.7 lb/sq ft (33 kg/m^{2})
