= Airdrome Fokker D-VII =

American replica fighter

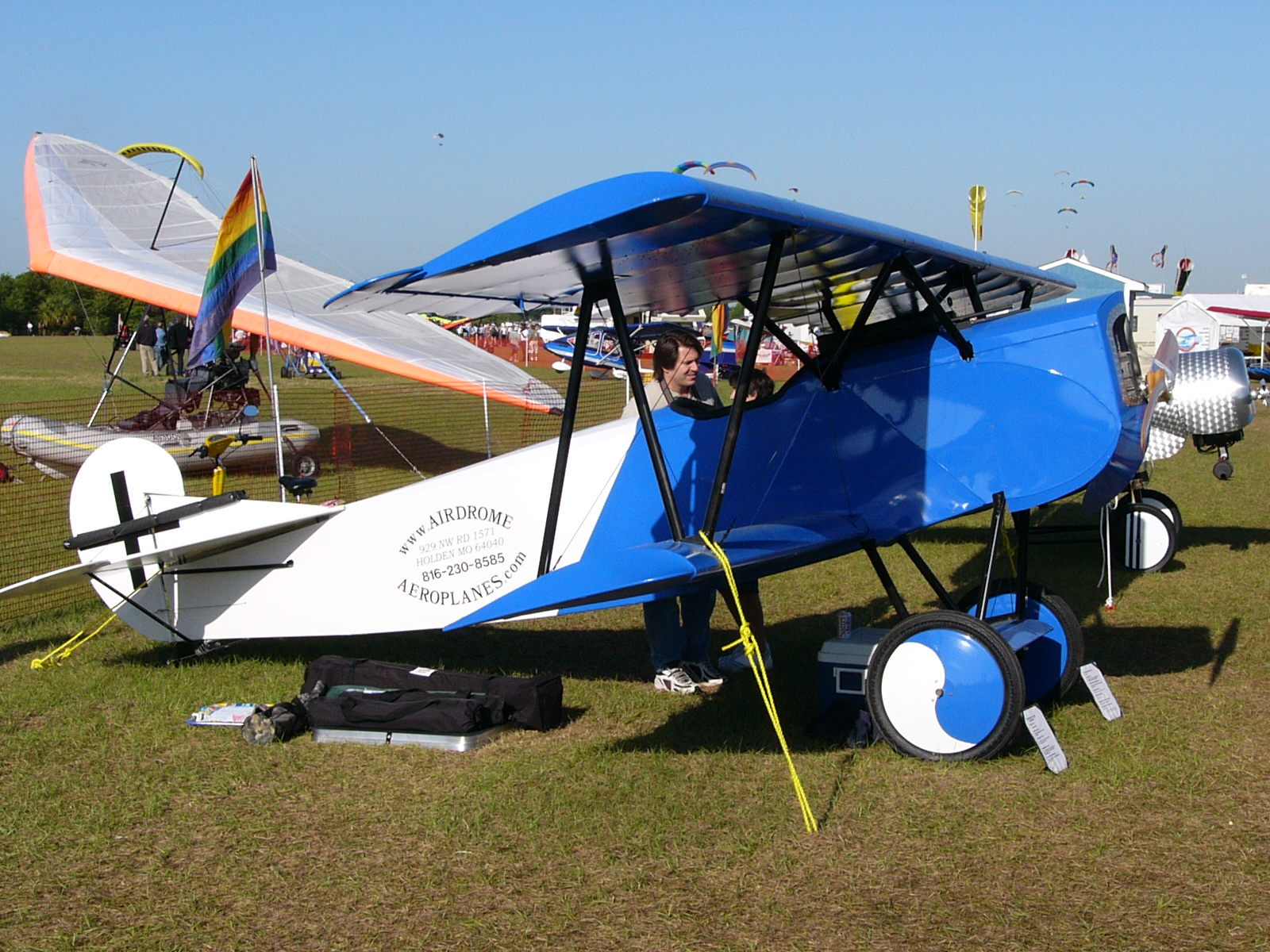
- Airdrome Airplanes Fokker D-VII at Sun 'n Fun 2004

General information
- Type: Amateur-built aircraft
- National origin: United States
- Manufacturer: Airdrome Aeroplanes
- Status: In production (2011)
- Number built: 5 (2011)

History
- Developed from: Fokker D.VII

The Airdrome Fokker D-VII is an American amateur-built aircraft, designed and produced by Airdrome Aeroplanes, of Holden, Missouri. The aircraft is supplied as a kit for amateur construction.

The aircraft is an 80% scale replica of the First World War German Fokker D.VII fighter, built from modern materials and powered by modern engines.

== Design and development ==
The Airdrome Fokker D-VII features a strut-braced biplane layout, a single-seat open cockpit, fixed conventional landing gear and a single engine in tractor configuration.

The aircraft is made from bolted-together aluminum tubing, with its flying surfaces covered in doped aircraft fabric. The kit is made up of twelve sub-kits. The Airdrome Fokker D-VII has a wingspan of 23.3 ft (7.1 m) and a wing area of 148 sq ft (13.7 m^{2}). It can be equipped with engines ranging from 80 to 110 hp (60 to 82 kW). The standard engine is the 110 hp (82 kW) Hirth F-30 two stroke engine, with a Volkswagen air-cooled engine with reduction drive optional. Building time from the factory-supplied kit is estimated at 400 hours by the manufacturer.

== Operational history ==
Five examples had been completed by December 2011.

== Specifications ==
Data from Kitplanes and Airdrome Aeroplanes

General characteristics

- Crew: one
- Length: 15 ft (4.6 m)
- Wingspan: 23.3 ft (7.1 m)
- Wing area: 148 sq ft (13.7 m^{2})
- Empty weight: 470 lb (213 kg)
- Gross weight: 770 lb (349 kg)
- Fuel capacity: 10 U.S. gallons (38 L; 8.3 imp gal)
- Powerplant: 1 × Hirth F-30 four cylinder, air-cooled, two stroke aircraft engine, 110 hp (82 kW)
- Propellers: 2-bladed wooden

Performance

- Maximum speed: 105 mph (169 km/h, 91 kn)
- Cruise speed: 94 mph (151 km/h, 82 kn)
- Stall speed: 34 mph (55 km/h, 30 kn)
- Range: 240 mi (390 km, 210 nmi)
- Rate of climb: 960 ft/min (4.9 m/s)
- Wing loading: 5.2 lb/sq ft (25 kg/m^{2})
