= Airdrome Bleriot Model XI =

American homebuilt aircraft

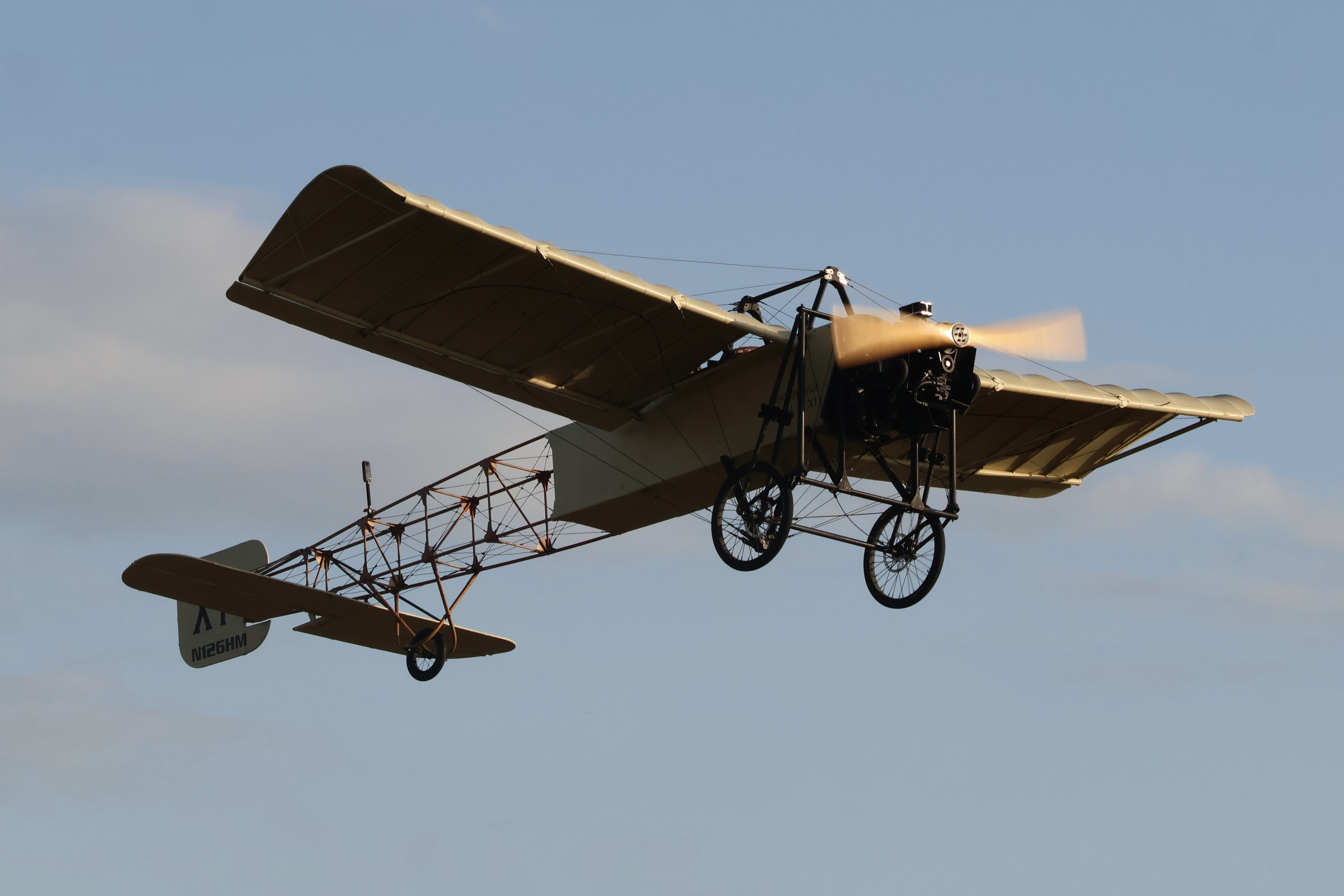

General information
- Type: Amateur-built aircraft
- National origin: United States
- Manufacturer: Airdrome Aeroplanes
- Status: In production (2011)
- Number built: 3 (full scale, 2011); 1 (3/4 scale, 2011)

History
- Developed from: Blériot XI

The Airdrome Bleriot Model XI, also referred to as the Airdrome Bleriot XI, is an American amateur-built aircraft, designed and produced by Airdrome Aeroplanes, of Holden, Missouri. The aircraft is supplied as a kit for amateur construction.

The aircraft is available as a full-scale or 3/4 replica of the French Blériot XI 1909 pioneer aircraft that was designed by Louis Blériot and used to fly across the English Channel on 25 July 1909. The replica is built from modern materials and powered by modern engines.

== Design and development ==
Airdrome Bleriot Model XI

The Airdrome Bleriot Model XI features a cable-braced monoplane layout, a single-seat open cockpit, fixed conventional landing gear and a single engine in tractor configuration.

The aircraft is made from steel and aluminum, with its flying surfaces covered in doped aircraft fabric. The full scale Airdrome Bleriot Model XI has a wingspan of 28.6 ft (8.7 m) and a wing area of 187 sq ft (17.4 m^{2}). The standard engine used on the full-scale version is the 110 hp (82 kW) four stroke Rotec R2800 radial engine, while the 3/4 scale version uses a Volkswagen air-cooled engine. Building time from the factory-supplied full scale kit is estimated at 375 hours by the manufacturer.

== Operational history ==
Three examples of the full scale and one 3/4 kit had been completed by December 2011.

== Specifications (Full Scale Bleriot Model XI) ==
Data from Kitplanes

General characteristics

- Crew: one
- Wingspan: 28.6 ft (8.7 m)
- Wing area: 187 sq ft (17.4 m^{2})
- Empty weight: 654 lb (297 kg)
- Gross weight: 1,014 lb (460 kg)
- Fuel capacity: 14 U.S. gallons (53 L; 12 imp gal)
- Powerplant: 1 × Rotec R2800 seven cylinder, air-cooled, four stroke radial engine, 110 hp (82 kW)
- Propellers: 2-bladed wooden

Performance

- Cruise speed: 50 mph (80 km/h, 43 kn)
- Stall speed: 32 mph (51 km/h, 28 kn)
- Range: 100 mi (160 km, 87 nmi)
- Rate of climb: 900 ft/min (4.6 m/s)
- Wing loading: 5.4 lb/sq ft (26 kg/m^{2})
