= Airdrome Sopwith Pup =

American homebuilt airplane

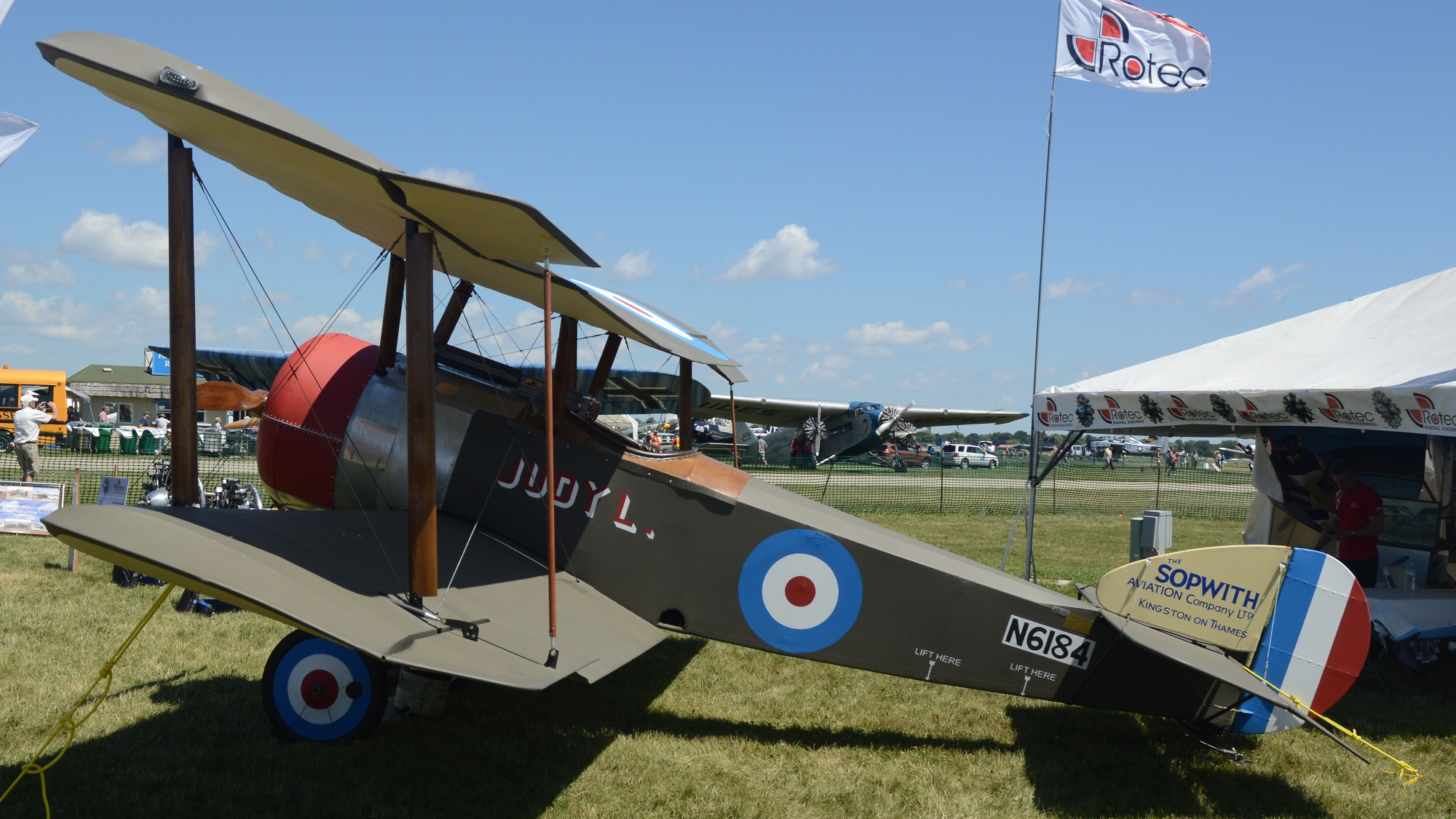

General information
- Type: Amateur-built aircraft
- National origin: United States
- Manufacturer: Airdrome Aeroplanes
- Status: In production (2011)
- Number built: 2 (2017)

History
- Developed from: Sopwith Pup

The Airdrome Sopwith Pup is an American amateur-built aircraft, designed and produced by Airdrome Aeroplanes in Holden, Missouri. It is supplied as a kit for amateur construction.

The aircraft is a full-scale replica of the First World War British Sopwith Pup fighter. The replica is built from modern materials and powered by modern engines.

== Design and development ==
The Airdrome Sopwith Pup features a strut-braced biplane layout, a single-seat open cockpit, fixed conventional landing gear and a single engine in tractor configuration.

The aircraft fuselage is made from metal tubing, covered in doped aircraft fabric. The Airdrome Sopwith Pup has a wingspan of 27 ft (8.2 m) and a wing area of 205 sq ft (19.0 m^{2}). It can be equipped with engines ranging from 110 to 150 hp (82 to 112 kW). The standard engine used is the 110 hp (82 kW) four stroke Rotec R2800 radial engine. Building time from the factory-supplied kit is estimated at 450 hours by the manufacturer.

== Operational history ==
One example had been completed by December 2011. Another example completed its first flight in late May 2017.

== Specifications (Sopwith Pup) ==
Data from Kitplanes

General characteristics

- Crew: one
- Length: 19 ft (5.8 m)
- Wingspan: 27 ft (8.2 m)
- Wing area: 205 sq ft (19.0 m^{2})
- Empty weight: 396 lb (180 kg)
- Gross weight: 596 lb (270 kg)
- Fuel capacity: 14 U.S. gallons (53 L; 12 imp gal)
- Powerplant: 1 × Rotec R2800 seven cylinder, air-cooled, four stroke radial engine, 110 hp (82 kW)
- Propellers: 2-bladed wooden

Performance

- Cruise speed: 81 mph (130 km/h, 70 kn)
- Stall speed: 37 mph (60 km/h, 32 kn)
- Range: 200 mi (320 km, 170 nmi)
- Rate of climb: 1,000 ft/min (5.1 m/s)
- Wing loading: 2.9 lb/sq ft (14 kg/m^{2})
