= Airdrome Fokker D-VIII =

American fighter replica

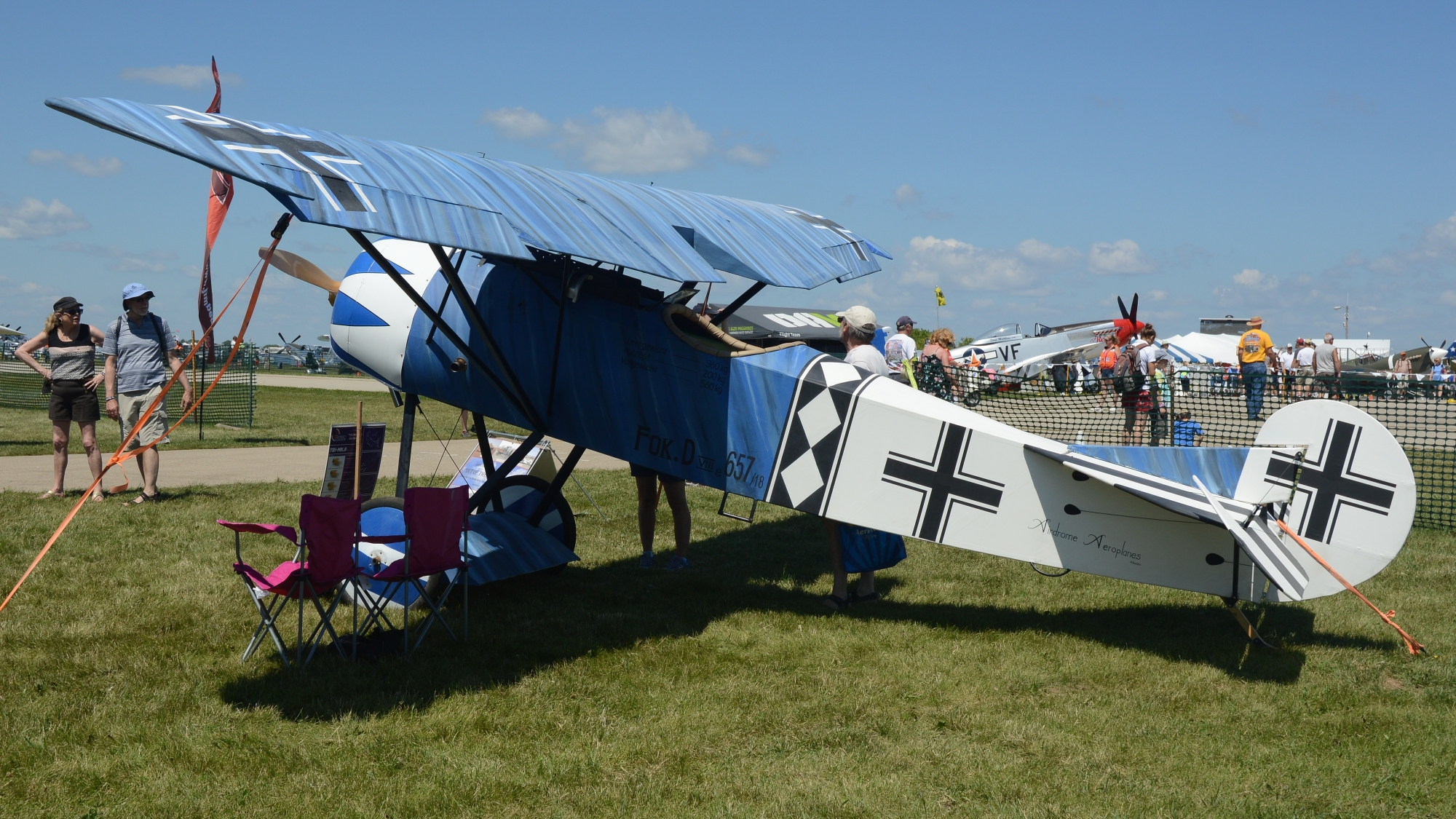

General information
- Type: Amateur-built aircraft
- National origin: United States
- Manufacturer: Airdrome Aeroplanes
- Status: In production (2011)
- Number built: 21 (2011)

History
- Developed from: Fokker D.VIII

The Airdrome Fokker D-VIII is an American amateur-built aircraft, designed and produced by Airdrome Aeroplanes, of Holden, Missouri. The aircraft is supplied as a kit for amateur construction.

The aircraft is a 3/4 scale replica of the First World War German Fokker D.VIII fighter, built from modern materials and powered by modern engines.

== Design and development ==
The Airdrome Fokker D-VIII features a parasol wing monoplane layout, a single-seat open cockpit, fixed conventional landing gear and a single engine in tractor configuration.

The aircraft is made from bolted-together aluminum tubing, with its flying surfaces covered in doped aircraft fabric. The kit is made up of twelve sub-kits. The Airdrome Fokker D-VIII has a wingspan of 25 ft (7.6 m) and a wing area of 75 sq ft (7.0 m^{2}). It can be equipped with engines ranging from 46 to 85 hp (34 to 63 kW). The standard engine is the 50 hp (37 kW) Rotax 503 two stroke engine or 35 hp (26 kW) Rotax 377, with a Volkswagen air-cooled engine optional. Continental A65 65 hp (48 kW) engines and 55 to 75 hp (41 to 56 kW) Lycoming O-145 powerplants have also been used. Building time from the factory-supplied kit is estimated at 400 hours by the manufacturer.

== Operational history ==
Twenty-one examples had been completed by December 2011.

== Specifications (Fokker D-VIII) ==
Data from Kitplanes and Airdrome Aeroplanes

General characteristics

- Crew: one
- Length: 16 ft (4.9 m)
- Wingspan: 25 ft (7.6 m)
- Wing area: 75 sq ft (7.0 m^{2})
- Empty weight: 275 lb (125 kg)
- Gross weight: 517 lb (235 kg)
- Fuel capacity: 10 U.S. gallons (38 L; 8.3 imp gal)
- Powerplant: 1 × Rotax 503 two cylinder, air-cooled, two stroke aircraft engine, 50 hp (37 kW)
- Propellers: 2-bladed wooden

Performance

- Maximum speed: 92 mph (148 km/h, 80 kn)
- Cruise speed: 80 mph (130 km/h, 70 kn)
- Stall speed: 32 mph (51 km/h, 28 kn)
- Range: 280 mi (450 km, 240 nmi)
- Rate of climb: 1,120 ft/min (5.7 m/s)
- Wing loading: 6.9 lb/sq ft (34 kg/m^{2})
