= Circa Reproductions Nieuport =

General information
- Type: Homebuilt warbird replica
- National origin: Canada
- Manufacturer: Circa Reproductions
- Designer: Graham Lee
- Number built: over 325 (Nieuport 11 as of 2003)

History
- First flight: July 1984

The Circa Reproductions Nieuports are a family of Canadian 7/8 scale World War I sesquiplane aircraft replicas designed by Graham Lee of Lamont, Alberta for amateur construction from plans sold by Lee's company Circa Reproductions. Leading Edge Air Foils of Peyton, Colorado at one time also made construction kits available. Lee's Nieuports were among the earliest First World War replicas available and paved the way for later companies to produce plans and kits for a great variety of warbirds.

The aircraft's design was attributed to "the result of many years of affection for WWI type aircraft and a "too limited" flying budget."

== Design and development ==
The Nieuport 11 was the first design in the family and is a 7/8 (87%) scale version of the original French Nieuport 11 Bebe fighter. The prototype, registered as a Canadian basic ultralight as C-IRCA, first flew in July 1984.

The Nieuport 11 is constructed from 6061-T6 aluminum tubing, supported with 2024-T3 aluminum gussets, held together with blind rivets. At one point welded steel tube fuselages were also available. The wings, tail and fuselage are then covered with doped aircraft fabric. Landing gear is conventional, with 24 in (61 cm) spoked mainwheels with bungee suspension. The original design calls for a tailskid, the same as the World War One original aircraft, but since the skid is impractical on hard surfaced runways, a tailwheel is optional. The engine cowling is a horseshoe shaped semi-circular design.

Recommended engines for the aircraft include the 40 hp (30 kW) Rotax 447, the 50 hp (37 kW) Rotax 503, Volkswagen air-cooled engines and various Hirth engines. The designer estimated that the Nieuport 11 would take 400 hours to construct.

The aircraft have been described as being "very easy to fly, even by novice pilots."

By 2015 over 1200 sets of plans had been sold.

== Operational history ==
The Nieuport 11 won Grand Champion Light Plane at Oshkosh in 1989 and the Nieuport 12 won Reserve Grand Champion at Oshkosh in 1990.

== Variants ==
Nieuport 11
Single seat 7/8 scale reproduction of the Nieuport 11 fighter of 1916. First flown in July 1984. Kits were available in ultralight and experimental versions to meet United States FAR 103 Ultralight Vehicles and Experimental amateur-built regulations respectively. The ultralight version uses lighter tubing, engine and wheels to save weight.
Nieuport 12
Two seat 7/8 scale reproduction of the Nieuport 12 WWI observation aircraft, first flown in 1989. The designer estimates construction time at 1400 hours. Aircraft has 1,000 lb (454 kg) gross weight. Recommended engines include the 64 hp (48 kW) Rotax 582, 65 hp (48 kW) Continental A65, 65 hp (48 kW) Lycoming O-145 or 60 hp (45 kW) Volkswagen air-cooled engine.
Nieuport 17
Single seat 7/8 scale reproduction of the Nieuport 17 WWI fighter aircraft. This variant is similar to the Nieuport 11, but with a 2 ft (61 cm) greater wingspan and a completely circular engine cowling. The designer estimates construction time at 400 hours.

== Specifications (Nieuport 11 Bebe) ==
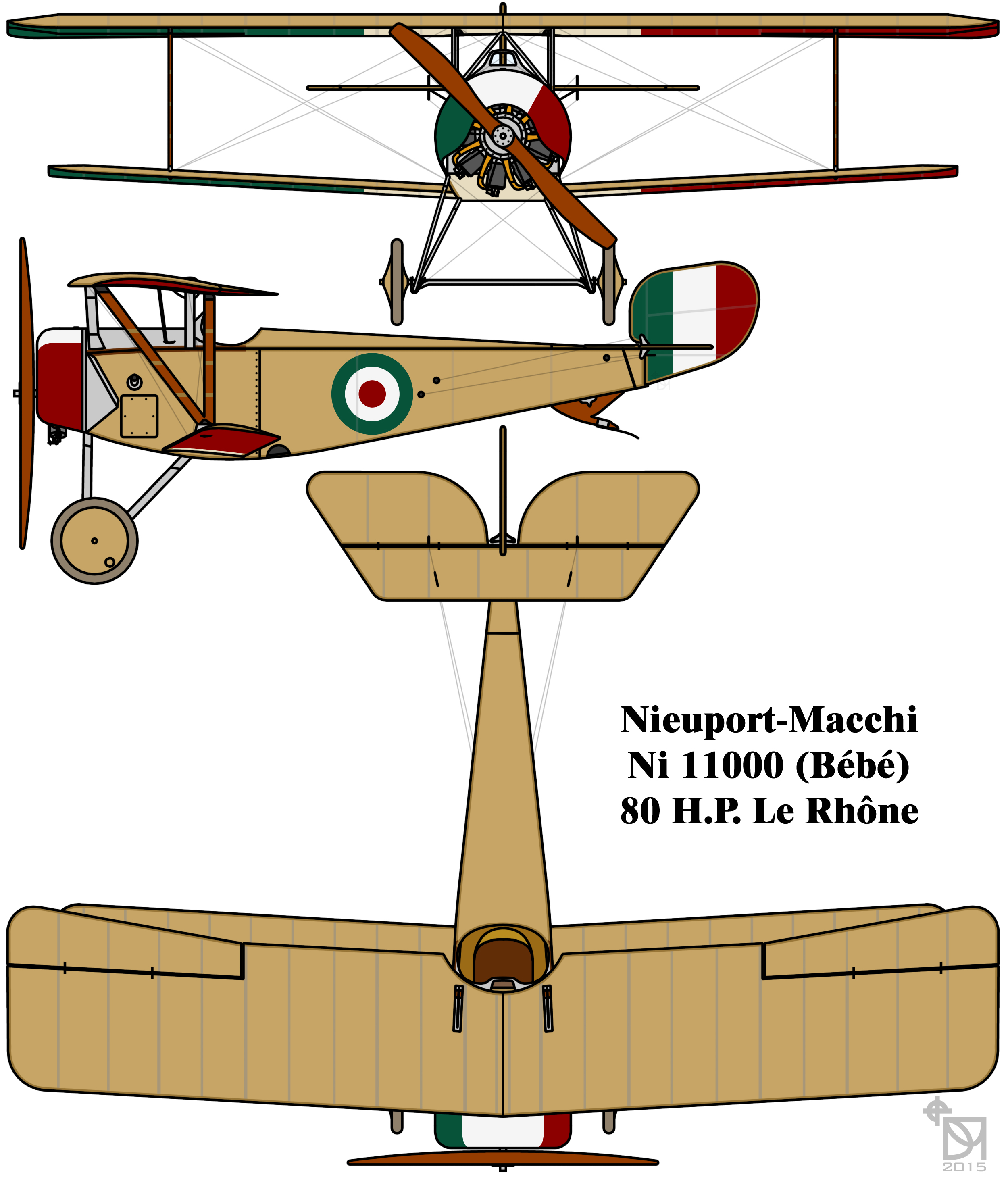
Three view drawing of the Nieuport 11

Data from Raisner

General characteristics

- Crew: one
- Length: 16 ft 0 in (4.88 m)
- Upper wingspan: 21 ft 6 in (6.55 m)
- Wing area: 114 sq ft (10.6 m^{2})
- Empty weight: 265 lb (120 kg)
- Gross weight: 550 lb (249 kg)
- Fuel capacity: 10 US Gallons (37.9 litres)
- Powerplant: 1 × Rotax 503 twin cylinder, two-stroke aircraft engine, 50 hp (37 kW)
- Propellers: 2-bladed wooden fixed pitch

Performance

- Maximum speed: 83 mph (134 km/h, 72 kn)
- Cruise speed: 65 mph (105 km/h, 56 kn)
- Stall speed: 27 mph (43 km/h, 23 kn)
- Range: 165 mi (266 km, 143 nmi)
- Service ceiling: 15,000 ft (4,600 m)
- Rate of climb: 750 ft/min (3.8 m/s)
- Wing loading: 4.82 lb/sq ft (23.5 kg/m^{2})

Armament

- Guns: One machine gun reproduction

Avionics

- none

== See also ==
- Airdrome Nieuport 11
- Airdrome Nieuport 17
