= Boyd G.B.1 =

G.B.1

General information
- Type: Two seat light kit-built aircraft
- National origin: United States
- Designer: Gary Boyd

History
- First flight: December 1979

The Boyd G.B.1 was a two-seat monoplane designed for homebuilt aircraft kit building from glass fibre parts.

== Design and development ==
Gary Boyd designed and built his G.B.1 over two-year period from 1977. The first flight was made in December 1979 and by early 1981 more than 70 flying hours had been achieved.

The G.B.1 was a monoplane almost entirely built from pre-moulded glass fibre components bonded together with polyester resin; these components, together with plans, were available to amateur builders. This structural approach was intended to make construction simple and also allowed the easy removal of the outer wing panels for transport. The prototype had a 1.8 L Volkswagen engine and a retractable, tailwheel undercarriage but the plans offered a choice of Volkswagen air-cooled engine installations in the 1.6 – 2.2 L range, as well as alternative fixed conventional undercarriage and retractable tricycle gear.

== Specifications (prototype) ==
Data from Jane's All the World's Aircraft 1981/82

General characteristics

- Crew: Two
- Length: 15 ft 7 in (4.74 m)
- Wingspan: 21 ft 0 in (6.40 m)
- Airfoil: RAF 48
- Empty weight: 550 lb (249 kg)
- Max takeoff weight: 1,100 lb (499 kg)
- Fuel capacity: 3 US gal (11.4 L; 2.5 Imp gal)
- Powerplant: 1 × HAPI Volkswagen 1.835 L (112 cu in) , 60 hp (45 kW)
- Propellers: 3-bladed

Performance

- Maximum speed: 170 mph (270 km/h, 150 kn) at 4,000 ft (1,220 m)
- Cruise speed: 150 mph (240 km/h, 130 kn)
- Stall speed: 45 mph (72 km/h, 39 kn)
- Endurance: 5 h
- Take-off run: 450 ft (137 m)
