= Airdrome Dream Classic =

Dream Classic

General information
- Type: Ultralight aircraft
- National origin: United States
- Manufacturer: Airdrome Aeroplanes
- Designer: Robert Baslee
- Number built: 56 (2011)

History
- Developed from: Santos-Dumont Demoiselle

The Airdrome Dream Classic is a minimalist, high wing, single seat, single engine ultralight aircraft inspired by the 1908 Santos-Dumont Demoiselle and produced in kit form by Airdrome Aeroplanes of Holden, Missouri.

The aircraft is intended for the US FAR 103 Ultralight Vehicles category.

== Development ==
The Dream Classic was designed as a low-cost and very basic ultralight. The fuselage is open and constructed from pop-riveted aluminum tubing. The wing is covered with aircraft fabric and is wire-braced utilizing a kingpost to support the ground loads or optionally strut-braced. The wings can be removed in 20 minutes for trailering. Controls are conventional three-axis, with the elevator and ailerons operated by a side stick.

Two different wings are available, a standard wing of 30.5 ft (9.3 m) span and 122 sq ft (11.35 sq m) area and a speed wing of 21.5 ft (6.6 m) span and 86 sq ft (8.00 sq m) area. The speed wing restricts the aircraft's useful load to 170 lb (77 kg), while the standard wing allows 250 lb (113 kg).

The standard engine is the 40 hp (30 kW) Rotax 447, although engines of 28 to 52 hp (21 to 39 kW) can be used. The manufacturer estimates that a builder will take 100–120 hours to complete this aircraft from the kit. In 2009 the airframe-only kit for the wire-braced version cost US$3495 and US$3995 for the strut-braced version. A completed airframe is also available for an additional US$2000.

By the fall of 2007, 48 wired braced and one strut-braced Dream Classics were flying.

== Variants ==
Dream Classic Standard
Single seat ultralight with 30.5 ft (9.3 m) wingspan and 122 sq ft (11.35 sq m) wing area, standard engine 40 hp (30 kW) Rotax 447
Dream Classic Speed
Single seat ultralight with 21.5 ft (6.6 m) wingspan and 86 sq ft (8.00 sq m) wing area, standard engine 40 hp (30 kW) Rotax 447

== Specifications (Dream Classic Speed) ==
Data from Airdrome Aeroplanes & Kitplanes

General characteristics

- Crew: one
- Capacity: 170 lb (77 kg); no passengers
- Length: 14 ft 0 in (4.27 m)
- Wingspan: 21 ft 6 in (6.6 m)
- Height: 6 ft 0 in (1.83 m)
- Wing area: 86 sq ft (8.00 m^{2})
- Empty weight: 223 lb (101 kg)
- Max takeoff weight: 393 lb (178 kg)
- Powerplant: 1 × Rotax 447 fixed pitch, 40 hp (30 kW)

Performance

- Maximum speed: 76 mph (123 km/h, 66 kn)
- Cruise speed: 68 mph (110 km/h, 59 kn)
- Stall speed: 31 mph (50 km/h, 27 kn)
- Rate of climb: 670 ft/min (3.4 m/s)
- Wing loading: 4.57 lb/sq ft (22.25 kg/m^{2})
- Power/mass: 9.3 lb/hp (0.16 kW/kg)

== See also ==
Aircraft of comparable role, configuration, and era

- Aero-Works Aerolite 103
- Ameri-Cana Eureka
- Avid Champion
- Beaujon Mach .07
- Beaujon Enduro
- Birdman WT-11 Chinook
- Fisher Avenger
- Hummel Bird
- ISON Airbike
- Skystar Kitfox Lite
- Spectrum RX-28 Beaver
