= Airdrome Aeroplanes =

American aircraft manufacturer

- Company type: Private company
- Industry: Aerospace
- Founded: 1989
- Headquarters: Holden, Missouri, United States
- Key people: CEO: Robert Baslee
- Products: Kit aircraft
- Number of employees: Two (2016)
- Website: www.airdromeaeroplanes.com

Airdrome Aeroplanes is an American aircraft manufacturer, founded by Robert Baslee, that offers a large selection of kit aircraft for amateur construction. The company is based in Holden, Missouri.

The company produces a range of kits specializing in replica aircraft from the pre-World War I pioneer period and from both the Central Powers and Allies of World War I.

== History ==
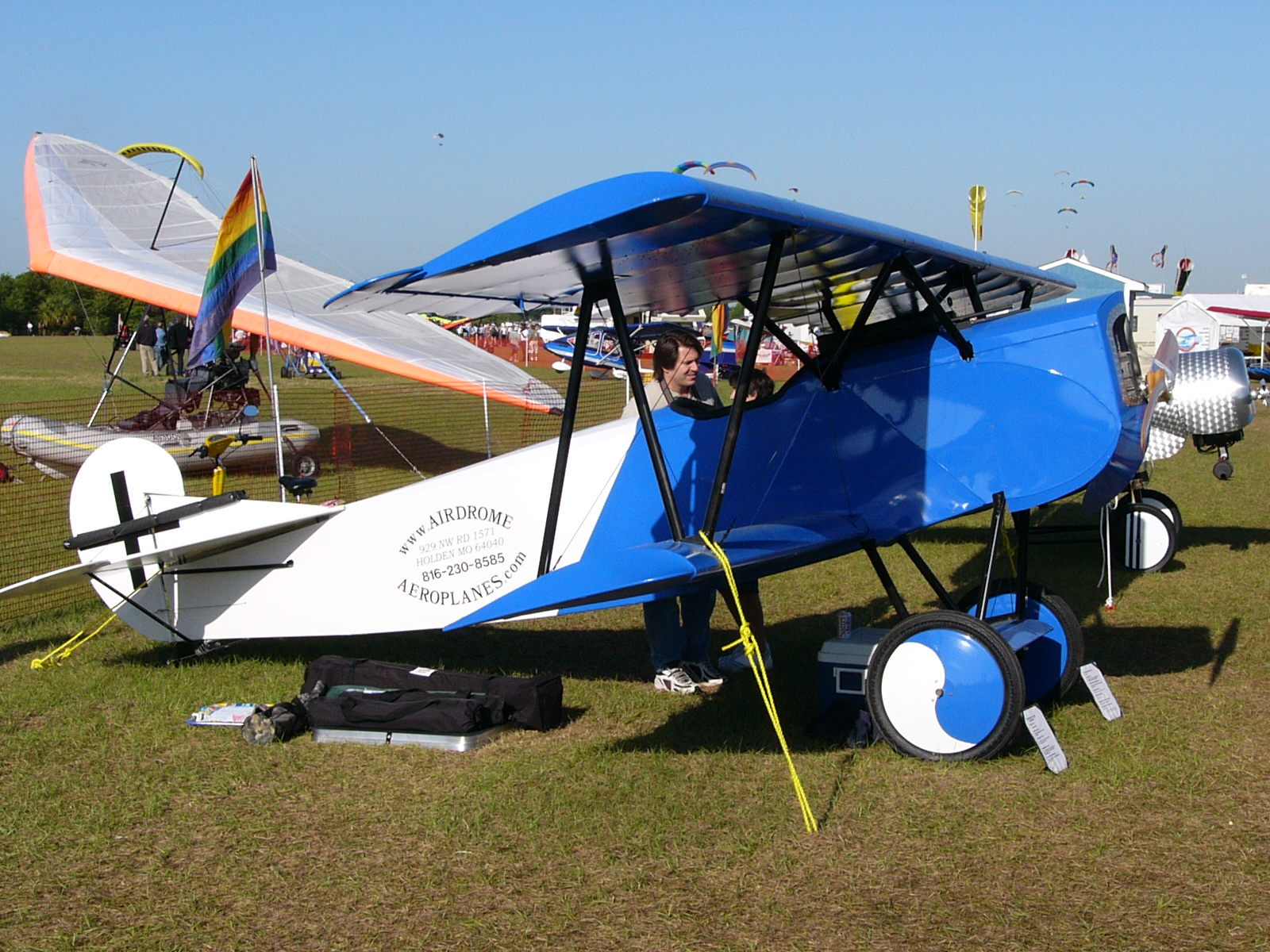
80% scale Airdrome Fokker D-VII at Sun 'n Fun 2004

Baslee started in aviation as a teenager, building model aircraft. He paid for his hobby by mowing lawns and shoveling snow in Lee's Summit, Missouri. A week before he turned 16, he sold all his models and started work on his private pilot certificate, completing it at age 17, with money earned working in the fast food industry. He became an apprentice machinist, graduated from high school in 1983 and later completed a degree in mechanical engineering.

Baslee constructed a series of homebuilt aircraft, selling each one to pay for the next one. He had aspired to build a Fokker Triplane, but found the existing replica plans very complex and slow to construct. He applied his engineering knowledge and created a new design of the DR.1, with a simplified structure and revised airfoil, a modified Clark Y, to improve handling. The resulting design uses aluminum tubing and pop riveted gussets, in place of wooden structure. All designs use a two-spar wing design to give redundancy not found in the original First World War designs. Most World War I designs were very tail-heavy and so the balance was adjusted in his designs to give a better center of gravity.

The prototype Triplane was shown at EAA AirVenture in 1989, resulting in requests for kits from prospective customers. This in turn resulted in the founding of the company to develop and produce the kits.

Each design is completed over about 1000 hours of work and then a prototype is finished. The prototype construction allows the completion of photographs and video of the construction techniques.

The company has two employees, including Baslee and ships an average of one kit per week. The company has about 500 aircraft flying.

The company is best known for its construction of four full-scale Nieuport 17 aircraft for the 2006 film Flyboys during a period of 52 days. The company also built a Morane L for the 2009 film Amelia.

== Aircraft ==
References: Kitplanes and Airdrome Aeroplanes

Summary of aircraft built by Airdrome Aeroplanes
Model name	First flight	Number built	Type
Bleriot Model XI		1	Pioneer aircraft replica
Dream Classic		49	Inspired by the pioneer Santos-Dumont Demoiselle
Dream Fantasy Twin		4	Two-seat version of the Dream Classic
Eindecker E-III		14	World War I aircraft replica
Fokker DR-1		23/5	World War I aircraft replica in 3/4 scale and full size
Fokker D-VI		7	World War I aircraft replica in 3/4 scale
Fokker D-VII		2	World War I aircraft replica 80% scale
Fokker D-VIII		16	World War I aircraft replica in 3/4 scale
Taube		1	World War I aircraft replica
Morane Saulnier L		1	World War I aircraft replica
Nieuport 11		1	World War I aircraft replica 7/8 scale
Nieuport 17		7	World War I aircraft replica
Nieuport 24		12	World War I aircraft replica
Nieuport 25			World War I aircraft replica
Nieuport 28		1	World War I aircraft replica
Sopwith Pup		2	World War I aircraft replica
Sopwith Camel		1	World War I aircraft replica
Sopwith Baby		1	World War I aircraft replica
DeHavilland DH-2		2	World War I aircraft 80% scale replica
