= Morane-Saulnier L =

French WW1 fighter and reconnaissance aircraft

Type L
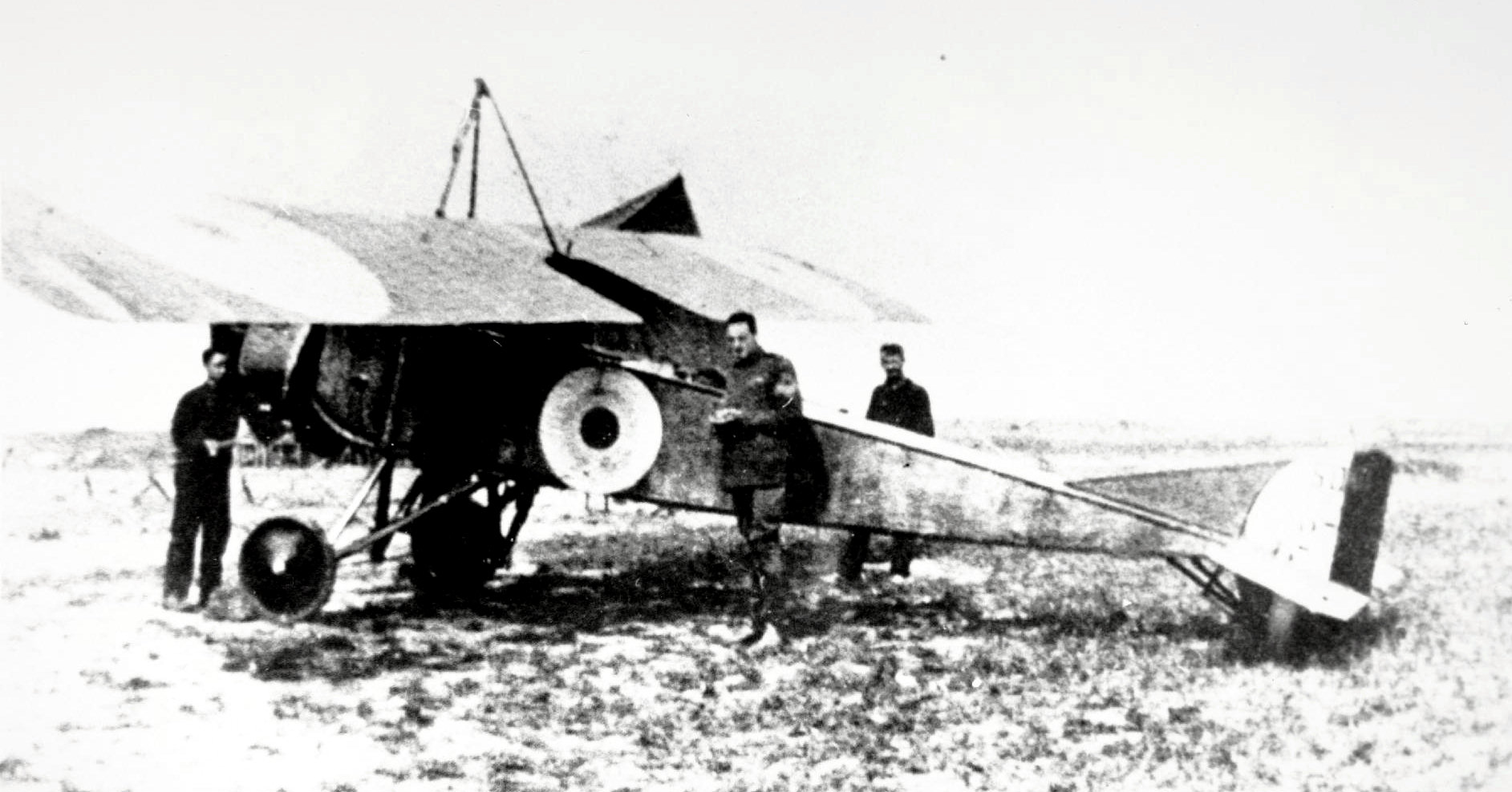
- RFC Morane-Saulnier L

General information
- Type: scout
- Manufacturer: Aéroplanes Morane-Saulnier
- Primary users: Aéronautique Militaire Royal Flying Corps; Royal Naval Air Service
- Number built: 600

History
- Introduction date: 1914
- First flight: August 1913

The Morane-Saulnier L, or Morane-Saulnier Type L, or, officially, MoS-3, was a French parasol wing one- or two-seat scout aeroplane of the First World War. The Type L became one of the first successful fighter aircraft when it was fitted with a single machine gun that fired through the arc of the propeller, which was protected by armoured deflector wedges. Its immediate effectiveness in this role launched an arms race in fighter development, and the Type L was swiftly rendered obsolete. The original Type L used wing warping for roll control, but a later version designated Type LA was fitted with ailerons.

Built by Morane-Saulnier, large numbers of the Type L were ordered by the French Aviation Militaire at the outbreak of the war. In total about 600 Type Ls were built and, in addition to the French air force, they served with the Royal Flying Corps, Royal Naval Air Service and the Imperial Russian Air Service.

The type was also produced under licence in Germany by Pfalz Flugzeugwerke as the unarmed A.I and A.II scouts (with 80 HP and 100 HP Oberursel engines respectively). About 60 were built for Bavarian air service. A few were later modified as the E.III fighters. A few Type Ls captured by Germany were fitted with a single German Spandau LMG 08 machine gun. These captured and converted aircraft are often mistaken for Pfalz E.IIIs.

About 450 aircraft were licence-built in Russia by Duks and Lebed works.

The Morane-Saulnier L was also built under licence in Sweden with some minor improvements as the Thulin D.

== Operational history ==
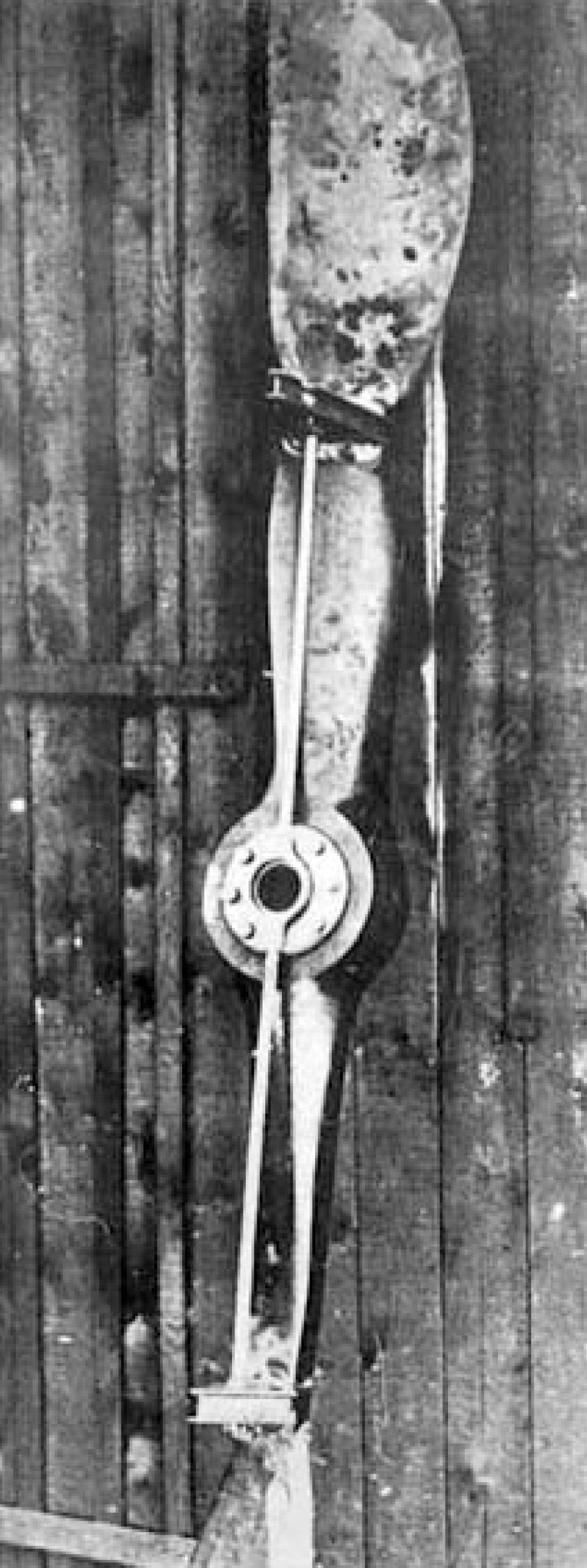
A propeller from an M-S Type L, complete with deflector wedges and supporting "tiebars".

In December 1914 the famous French aviator Roland Garros, then serving with Escadrille 23, worked with Raymond Saulnier to create a gun synchronizer, using the gas operated Hotchkiss light machine gun. However, the firing rate fluctuated too much for the synchronizer to function properly. As an interim measure, they then designed a "safety backup" in the form of braced "deflectors" (metal wedges) fitted to the rear surfaces of the propeller blades at the points where they could be struck by a bullet. Garros took his Type L fighter into combat with the deflectors in March 1915 and achieved immediate success, shooting down three German aircraft in April, a noteworthy feat at the time. The bullets that the French used were not likely to damage the harder steel of the wedges themselves. On 18 April 1915, Garros' deflector-equipped Type L force-landed behind German lines and was captured before he could destroy it.

Three two-seat Morane Type L aircraft were also the first victims of the first German fighter aircraft. Leutnant Kurt Wintgens, flying the Parabellum machine gun-armed Fokker Eindecker M.5K/MG prototype E.5/15, a copy of the Morane-Saulnier H with a wire-braced welded steel tube fuselage and fitted with the Fokker Stangensteuerung synchronized gun, downed the first on July 1, 1915, followed by two similar victories on July 4 and 15.

About 50 Type Ls were delivered to Britain's Royal Flying Corps, which used them as reconnaissance aircraft during 1915, with a further 25 being operated by the Royal Naval Air Service. On 7 June 1915 one of these aircraft, flown by Flight Sub-Lieutenant Reginald Alexander John Warneford of 1 Squadron RNAS intercepted the Deutsches Heer-flown Zeppelin LZ.37, destroying it, the first Zeppelin to be destroyed in the air. Warneford received the Victoria Cross for this achievement.

Cecil Lewis served with the RFC's Squadron Number 3 in 1916 through the Somme offensive. He flew the Type LA "Parasol" (as it was known) operationally, for over three hundred hours and was awarded the Military Cross. Most of that flying was conducted on a single airframe, RFC serial 5133. In his book "Sagittarius Rising" he recalled of the LA:

"I had a look over her, and the more I saw of her the less I liked her. It was certainly not love at first sight . . . the elevator was as sensitive as a gold balance; the least movement stood you on your head or on your tail. You couldn't leave the machine to its own devices for a moment . . . the Morane really was a death trap . . . Subsequently I flew every machine used by the Air Force during the war. They were all child's play after the Morane . . . but I did come to love the Morane as I loved no other aeroplane."

A Morane-Saulnier "Parasol" was used for the first flight by an airplane across the Andes on April 13, 1918, when the Argentine aviator Luis Candelaria flew from Zapala, Argentina, to Cunco, Chile; the flight lasted 2 hours 30 minutes and reached an altitude of 4,000 meters.

== Variants ==
- L company designation for basic model
  - MoS-3 official government/STAe designation for L
- LA company designation for improved L with faired fuselage and ailerons
  - MoS-4 official government/STAe designation for LA
- LH fighter developed from LA
  - MoS-20 official government/STAe designation for LH
- Pfalz A.I with Oberursel U.0 engine
- Pfalz A.II with Oberursel U.I engine
- Pfalz E.III - A Pfalz A.II armed with single synchronised lMG 08 machine gun
- Thulin D modified L built under licence in Sweden.

== Operators ==
Argentina

- Argentine Air Force - one aircraft

Belgium

- Belgian Air Force

Brazil

- Brazilian Army Aviation

Czechoslovakia

- Czechoslovak Air Force - one aircraft

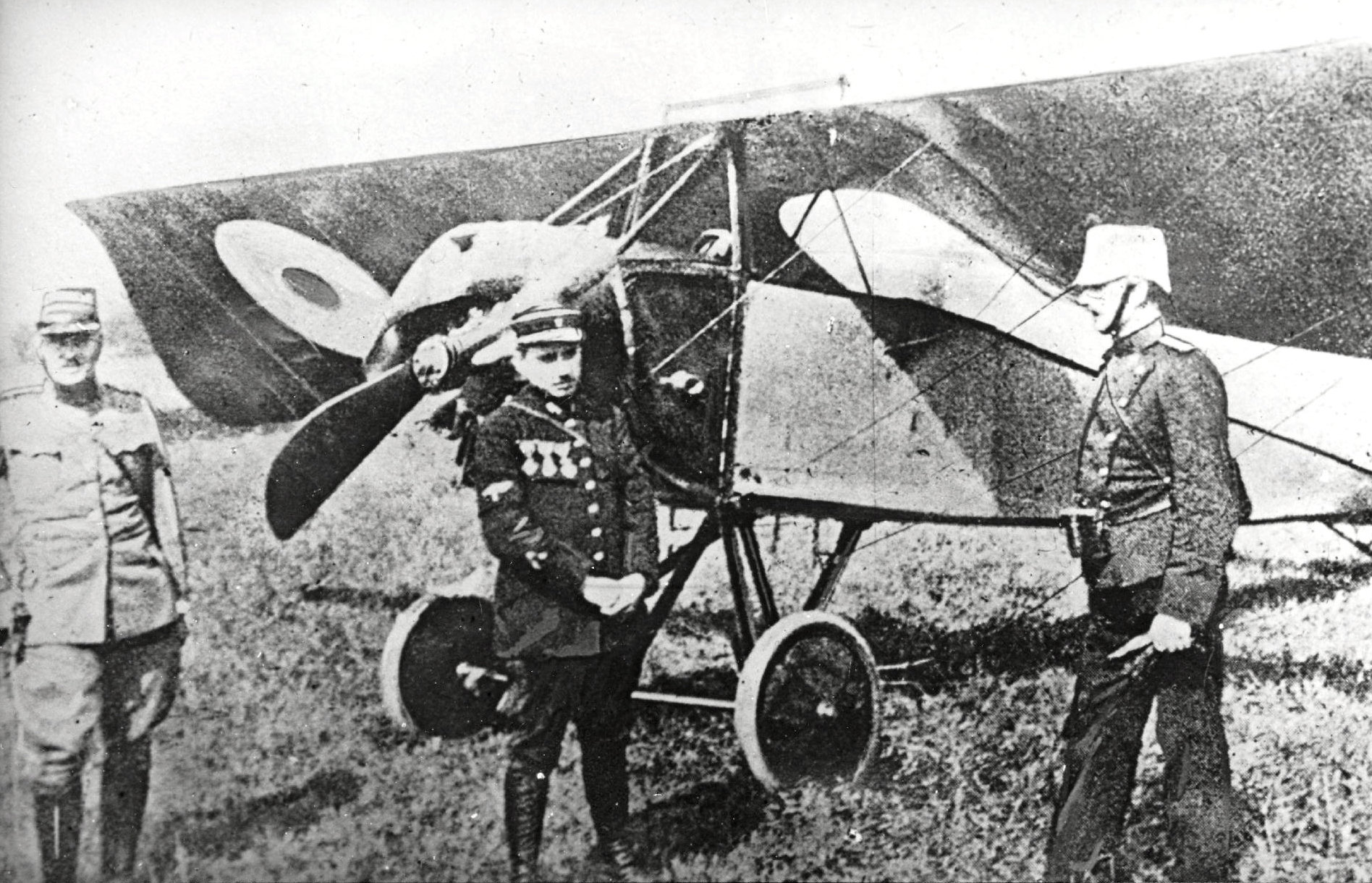
French Morane-Saulnier L

Finland

- Finnish Air Force - two aircraft

France

- French Air Force

Netherlands

- Royal Netherlands Air Force - one aircraft

Peru

- Peruvian Air Force

Poland

- Polish Air Force

Romania

- Romanian Air Corps

Russian Empire

- Imperial Russian Air Service

Sweden

- Swedish Air Force - one aircraft

Switzerland

- Swiss Air Force - one aircraft

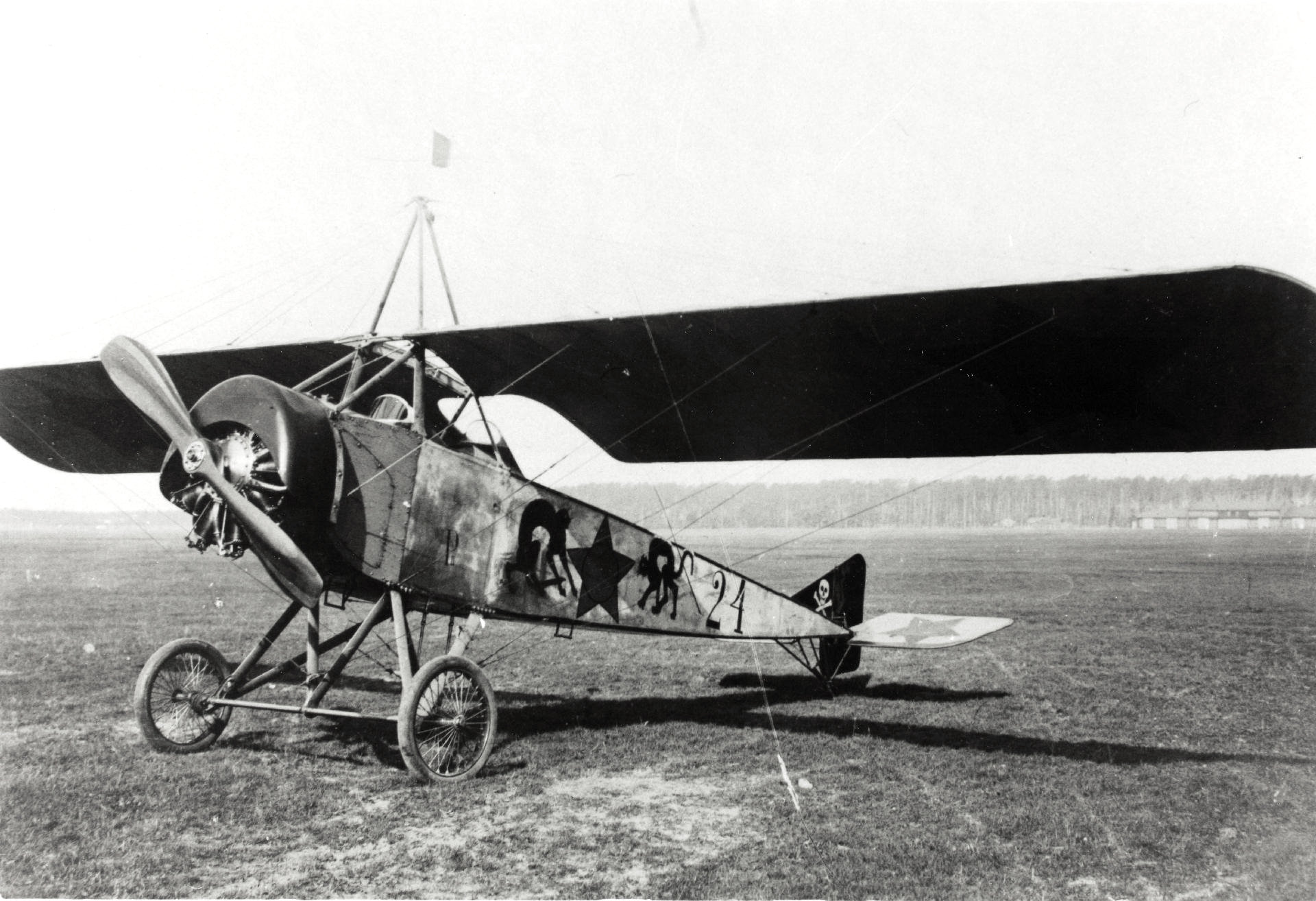
Soviet Morane-Saulnier L

Turkey

- Ottoman Air Force - original and Pfalz A.II aircraft

Ukraine

- Ukrainian Air Force - three aircraft

Soviet Union

- Soviet Air Force - ex-Imperial Russian Air Service aircraft

United Kingdom

- Royal Flying Corps
  - No. 1 Squadron RFC
  - No. 3 Squadron RFC
  - No. 30 Squadron RFC
- Royal Naval Air Service

== Specifications (Type L) ==
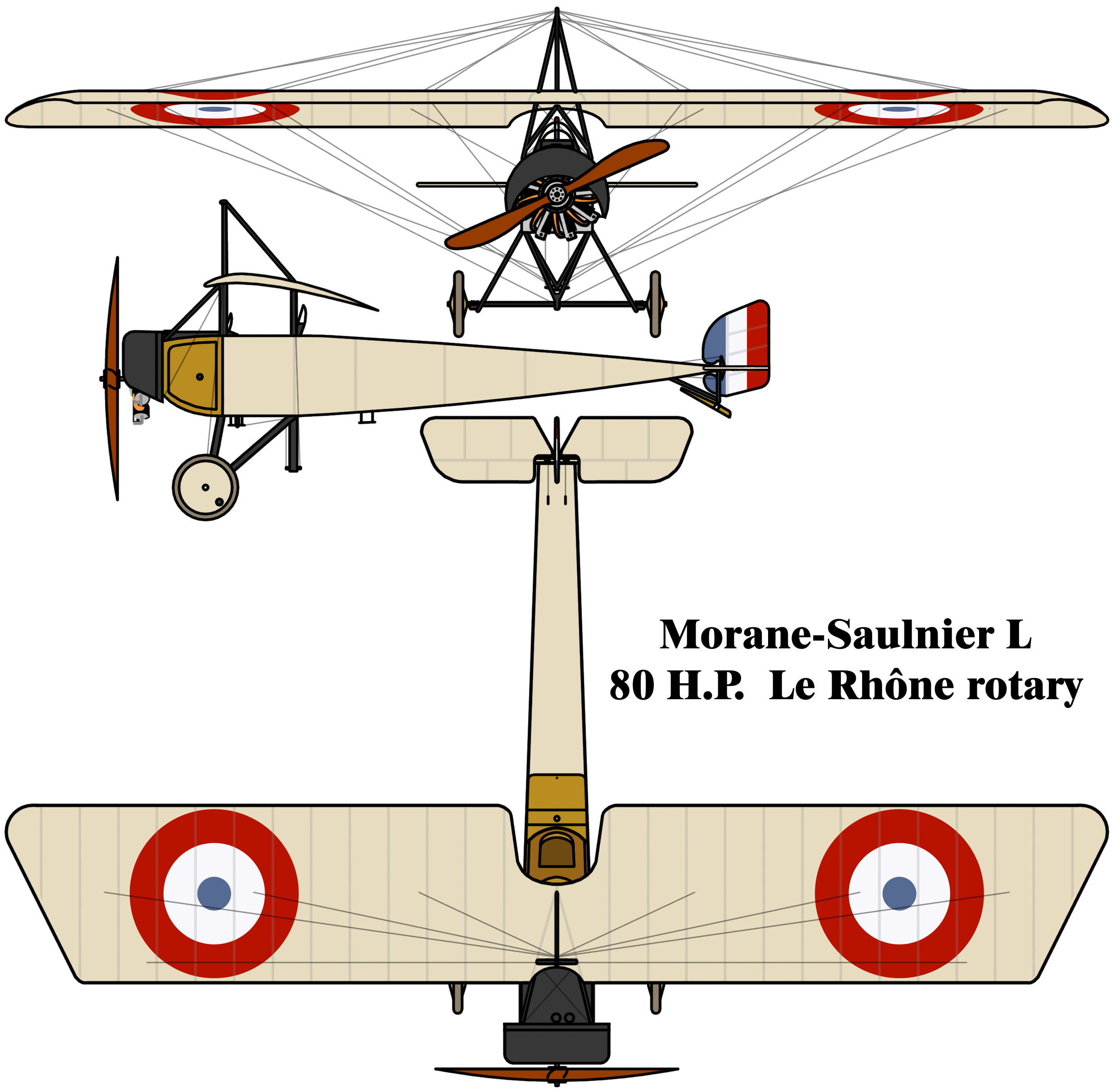
Morane-Saulnier L drawing

Data from Aeroplanes of the Royal Flying Corps (Military Wing.)

General characteristics

- Crew: 2
- Length: 6.88 m (22 ft 7 in)
- Wingspan: 11.20 m (36 ft 9 in)
- Height: 3.93 m (12 ft 11 in)
- Wing area: 18.3 m^{2} (197 sq ft)
- Empty weight: 393 kg (866 lb)
- Gross weight: 667.5 kg (1,472 lb)
- Powerplant: 1 × Le Rhône 9C 9-cylinder air-cooled rotary piston engine, 60 kW (80 hp)
- Propellers: 2-bladed fixed-pitch propeller

Performance

- Maximum speed: 125 km/h (78 mph, 67 kn)
- Time to altitude: 1,000 m (3,300 ft) in 8 minutes

Armament

- Guns: 1 × 0.303 in (7.7 mm) Lewis gun

== See also ==
Related development

- Morane-Saulnier Type G shoulder wing monoplane precursor
- Morane-Saulnier Type N
- Airdrome Morane Saulnier L, a modern kit reproduction
