= Volkswagen air-cooled engine =

German automotive engine

Volkswagen Boxer Engine

Overview
- Manufacturer: Volkswagen
- Production: 1936–2006

Layout
- Configuration: Flat-4 naturally aspirated petrol engine
- Displacement: 1.0 L (985 cc); 1.1 L (1,131 cc); 1.2 L (1,192 cc); 1.3 L (1,285 cc); 1.5 L (1,493 cc); 1.6 L (1,584 cc); 1.7 L (1,679 cc); 1.8 L (1,795 cc); 2.0 L (1,971 cc)
- Cylinder bore: 70 mm (2.76 in); 75 mm (2.95 in); 77 mm (3.03 in); 83 mm (3.27 in); 85.5 mm (3.37 in); 90 mm (3.54 in); 93 mm (3.66 in) 94 mm (3.70 in)
- Piston stroke: 64 mm (2.52 in); 66 mm (2.60 in); 69 mm (2.72 in); 71 mm (2.80 in)

Chronology
- Successor: Volkswagen Wasserboxer engine

The Volkswagen air-cooled engine is an air-cooled, gasoline-fuelled, boxer engine with four horizontally opposed cast-iron cylinders, cast aluminum alloy cylinder heads and pistons, magnesium-alloy crankcase, and forged steel crankshaft and connecting rods.

There are two distinct families/variations of the aircooled engine, namely Type 1 and Type 4. The Type 3 engine is a variation of the Type 1 engine with a low-profile cooling arrangement.

Variations of the engine were produced by Volkswagen plants worldwide from 1936 until 2006 for use in Volkswagen's own vehicles, notably the Type 1 (Beetle), Type 2 (transporter), Type 3, and Type 4. Additionally, the engines were widely used in industrial, light aircraft and kit car applications.

== Type 1: 1.0–1.6 litres ==
Volkswagen Type 1 Engine

Overview
- Manufacturer: Volkswagen
- Also called: Type 3 engine (when equipped with a crank mounted cooling fan)
- Production: 1936-2006

Layout
- Configuration: Flat-4 naturally aspirated petrol engine
- Cylinder block material: Aluminum / magnesium alloy
- Cylinder head material: Aluminum alloy
- Valvetrain: Pushrod OHV

Combustion
- Fuel system: Mechanical / Carbureted / Digifant EFI (Mexico and U.S. Type 3 only)
- Fuel type: Gasoline
- Oil system: Wet sump
- Cooling system: Air-cooled

Chronology
- Successor: Volkswagen Type 4 engine

The Type 1 engine got its name from the Type 1 Beetle it originally came with. It evolved from the original 985 cc in the KdF wagen in 1939 to the 1600 cc dual port fuel-injected engine that came in the 2003 Mexican Beetle. The very last Type 1 engine came in the 2006 Type 2c built in Brazil. In most applications, the Type 1 engine came with an upright cooling shroud and a belt driven fan.

When equipped with crank mounted cooling fan, the Type 1 engine may be referred as Type 3 engine. These engines came only in 1500 cc and 1600 cc configurations in Volkswagen Type 3 based vehicles. The Type 1 engine was also used in Type 2 vehicles with additional engine mounting provisions. The term "universal engine case" refers to an engine case that can be used for all three applications. All Type 1 engines used lighter magnesium alloy for the engine case even though late model engines used stronger alloys for durability. The bore spacing on Type 1 engine is 112 mm.

A re-design of the Type 1 engine was introduced in 1968 in the Volkswagen Type 4. It came to be known as the Type 4 engine. It was larger and more powerful and shared almost nothing with the Type 1 engine other than the general architecture of the longblock.

=== 1000 ===
- 1938–1942 KdF-Wagen
- 1941–1942 Volkswagen Kübelwagen

Volkswagen 1000 engine

Overview
- Production: 1938–1942

Layout
- Displacement: 985 cc (60.1 cu in)
- Cylinder bore: 70 mm (2.76 in)
- Piston stroke: 64 mm (2.52 in)
- Compression ratio: 5.8:1

Output
- Power output: 18 kW (24 PS; 24 bhp) at 3,000 rpm, 22 kW (30 PS; 30 bhp)

=== 1100 ===
Volkswagen 1100 engine
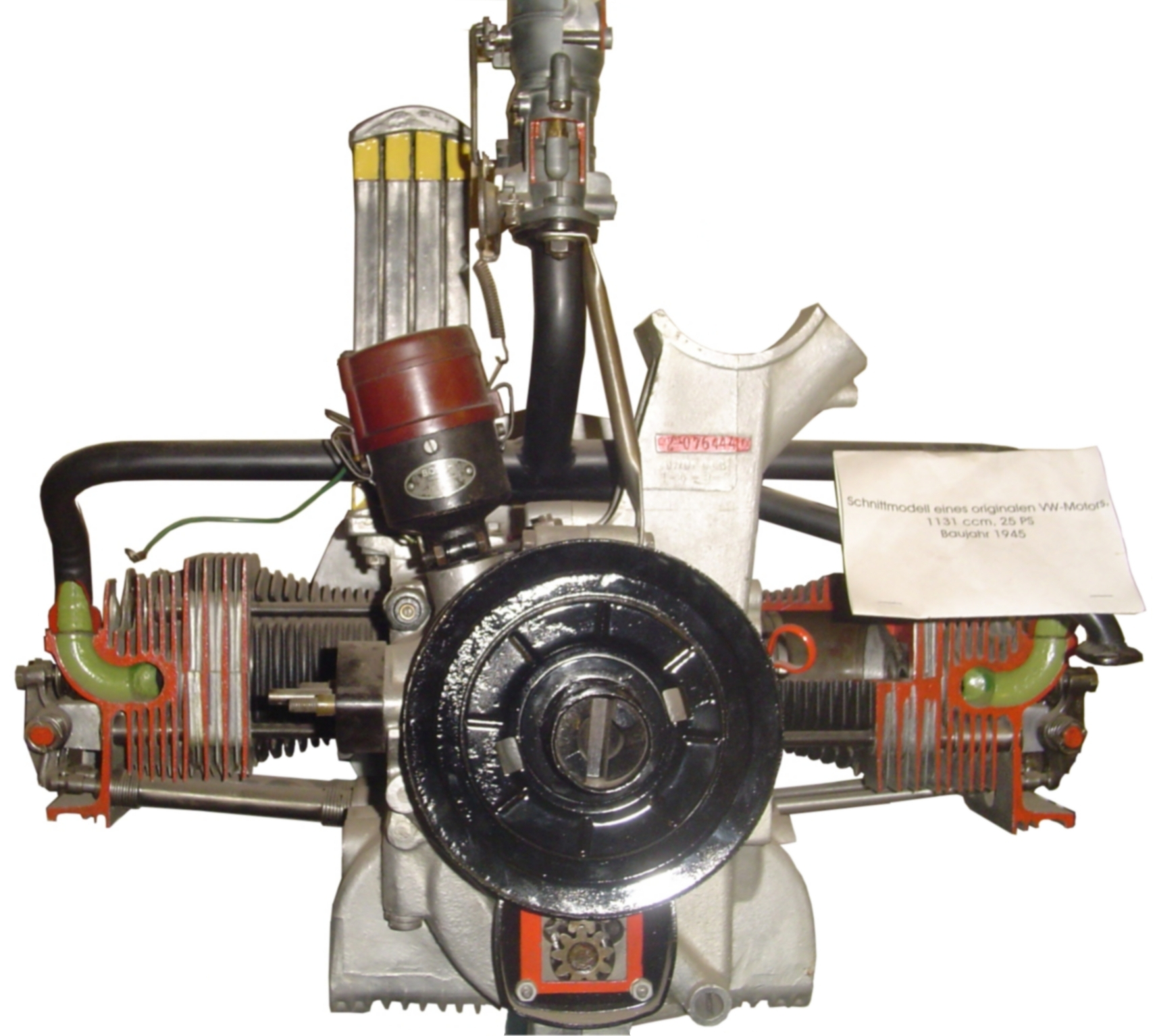
- Cutaway 1945 1131 cc engine

Overview
- Also called: 1100 engine
- Production: 1945–1953

Layout
- Displacement: 1,131 cc (69.0 cu in)
- Cylinder bore: 75 mm (2.95 in)
- Piston stroke: 64 mm (2.52 in)
- Compression ratio: 5.8:1

Output
- Power output: 18 kW (24 PS; 24 bhp) at 3,300 rpm, 22 kW (30 PS; 30 bhp)
- Specific power: 15.9 kW (22 PS; 21 bhp) / L (18kW variant)
- Torque output: 68 N⋅m (50 lbf⋅ft) at 2,000 rpm

Like the Volkswagen Beetle produced after the war, the first Volkswagen Transporters (bus) used the Volkswagen air-cooled engine, a 1.1 litre, DIN-rated 18 kW (24 PS, 24 bhp), air-cooled four-cylinder "boxer" engine mounted in the rear. The 22-kilowatt (29 PS; 29 bhp) version became standard in 1955, while an unusual early version of the engine which developed 25 kilowatts (34 PS; 34 bhp) debuted exclusively on the Volkswagen Type 2 (T1) in 1959.

- 1942–1944 Volkswagen Schwimmwagen
- 1942–1945 Volkswagen Kübelwagen, Volkswagen KdF-Wagen
- 1945–1953 Volkswagen Beetle
- 1950–1953 Volkswagen Type 2

=== 1200 ===
Volkswagen Typ 1200
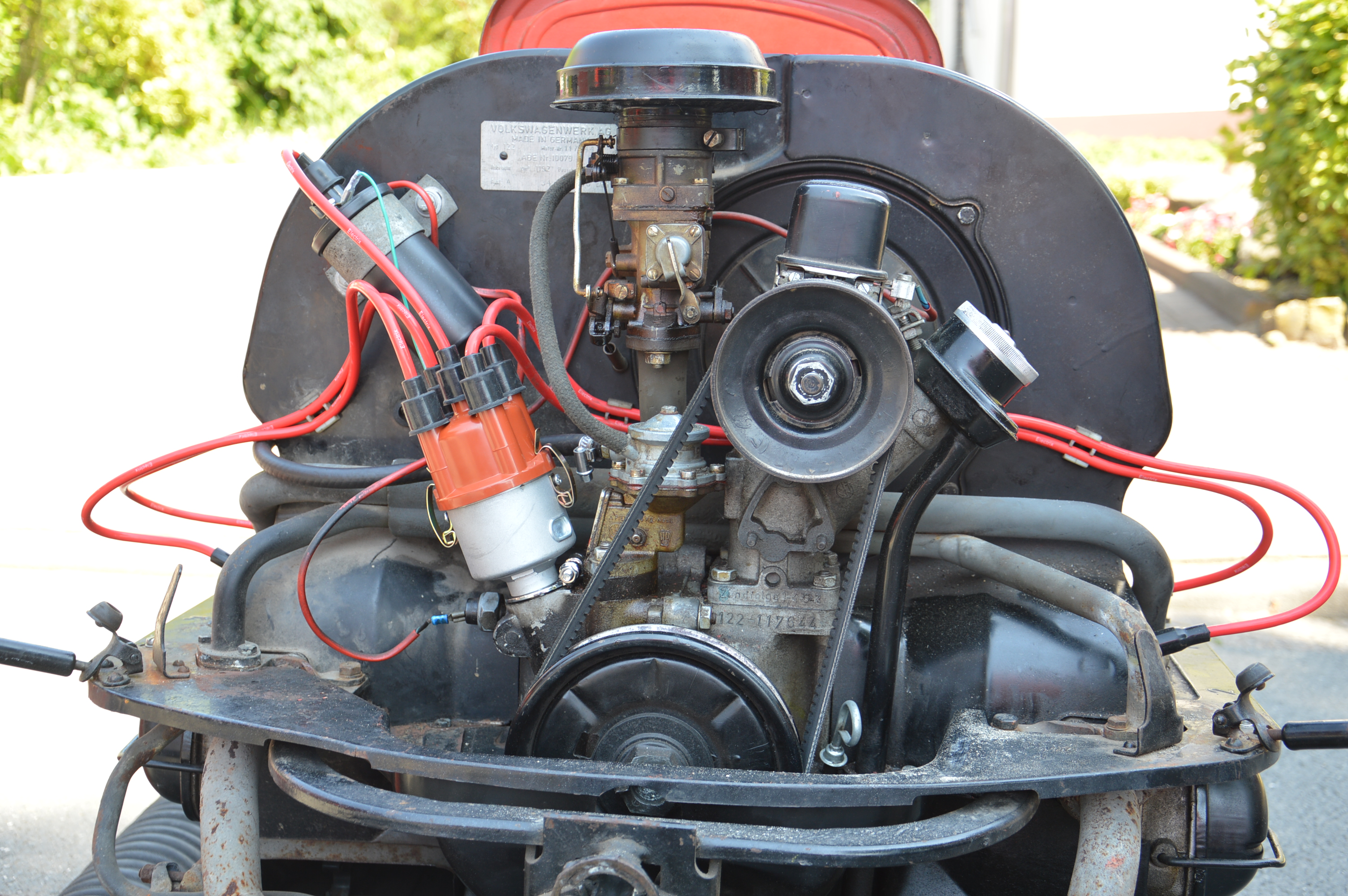

Overview
- Also called: 1200 Engine
- Production: 1950–1991

Layout
- Displacement: 1,192 cc (72.7 cu in)
- Cylinder bore: 77 mm (3.03 in)
- Piston stroke: 64 mm (2.52 in)
- Compression ratio: 7.0:1 – 7.3:1

Combustion
- Fuel system: Carburettor; Solex 28 PCI or Solex 28 PICT
- Fuel type: Carburettor fuel 86 RON (7:1 compression ratio); 87 RON (7,3:1 compression ratio)

Output
- Power output: 22 kW (30 PS; 30 bhp); 25 kW (34 PS; 34 bhp); 27 kW (37 PS; 36 bhp); 30 kW (41 PS; 40 bhp)
- Specific power: 18.5–21.0 kW (25–29 PS; 25–28 bhp) / L
- Torque output: depending on engine application, around ~70–80 N·m

The 1.2-litre engine is called Type 122 and has a displacement of 1,192 cc (72.7 cu in). As industrial engine, its rated power is 22.8 kW (31 PS; 31 bhp) at 3000 min^{−1} without a governor, the highest torque 81.4 N⋅m (60 lbf⋅ft) at 2000 min^{−1}. With a governor set to 8% accuracy, the rated power is 21.33 kW (29 bhp; 29 PS) at 3000 min^{−1}, the highest torque is 69.63 N⋅m (51 lbf⋅ft) at 2000 min^{−1}. For other applications, the power and torque output may vary, e.g. On the Beetle produced 41 PS (40 bhp; 30 kW) at 3900 rpm and 88 N⋅m (65 lbf⋅ft) of torque at 2400 rpm.

=== 1300 ===
Volkswagen 1300 engine

Overview
- Production: 1966–1995

Layout
- Displacement: 1,285 cc (78.4 cu in)
- Cylinder bore: 77 mm (3.03 in)
- Piston stroke: 69 mm (2.72 in)

1285 cc Single port 1966, type 1, beetle only. With Higher compression, it developed 50 bhp. It was a problematic engine, and so only used in the North American market in type 2 vehicles for model year 1966.

- 1966 Volkswagen Beetle (Europe, North America)
- 1966-70 Volkswagen Beetle (Europe, Non-USA)
- 1966 Type 2 (North America)
- 1971-73 Type 2 (Non USA) AB Engine code
- 1971-72 Non USA Low octane markets AC Engine code

== Type 4: 1.7–2.0 litres ==
From 1968 to 1983, the Type 4 engine was produced in 1.7, 1.8 and 2.0 litre variants.

== Other applications ==
Beginning in 1987, Dunn-Right Incorporated of Anderson, South Carolina, US has made a kit to perform the conversion of a VW engine to a compressor.

=== Industrial ===
Volkswagen AG has offered these air-cooled boxer engines for use in industrial applications since 1950, lately under its Volkswagen Industrial Motor brand. Available in 18 kilowatts (24 PS; 24 bhp), 22 kilowatts (30 PS; 30 bhp), 25 kilowatts (34 PS; 34 bhp), 31 kilowatts (42 PS; 42 bhp), 33 kilowatts (45 PS; 44 bhp) and 46 kilowatts (63 PS; 62 bhp) outputs, from displacements of 1.2 litres (73 cu in) to 1.8 litres (110 cu in), these Industrial air-cooled engines were officially discontinued in 1991.

=== Aircraft ===
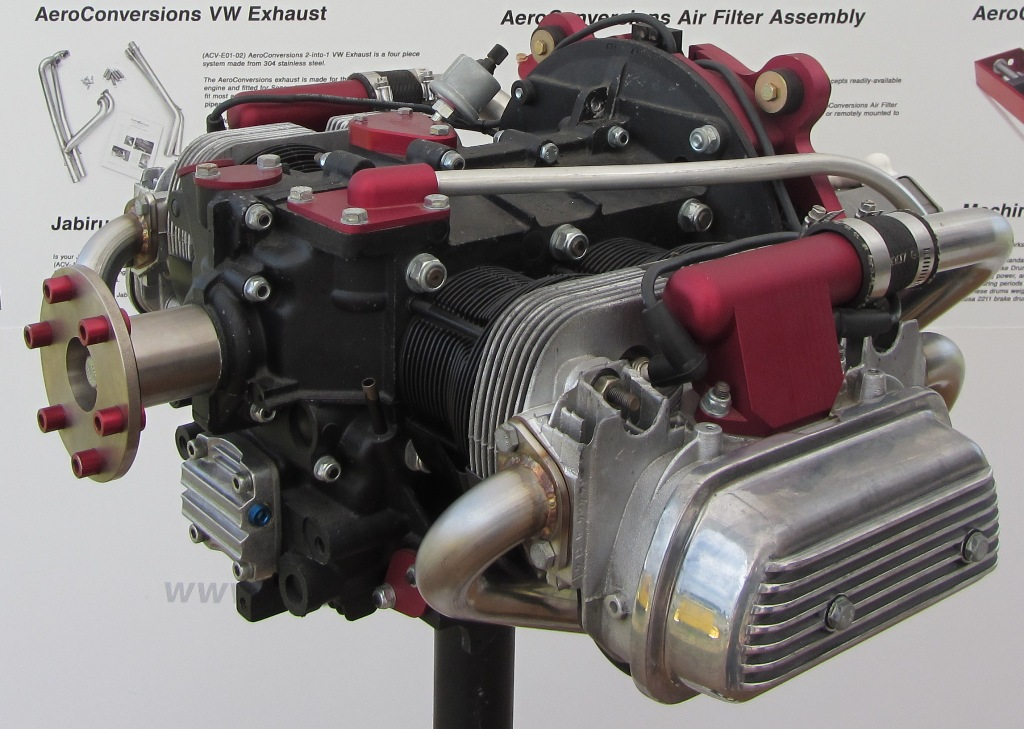
AeroConversions AeroVee Engine

The air-cooled opposed four-cylinder Beetle engines have been used for other purposes as well. Limbach Flugmotoren has since 1970 produced more than 6,000 aircraft engines based on the Beetle engine. Sauer has since 1987 produced certified engines for small airplanes and motorgliders, and is now also producing engines for the ultralight community in Europe.

This type of VW engine deployment started separately in Europe and in the US. In Europe this started in France soon after the Second World War using the engine in the Volkswagen Kübelwagen that were abandoned by the thousands in the country side and peaked with the JPX engine. In the US this started in the 1960s when VW Beetle started to be imported. A number of companies still produce aero engines that are Volkswagen Beetle engine derivatives: Limbach, Sauer, Hapi, Revmaster, Great Plains Type 1 Front Drive, Hummel, the AeroConversions AeroVee Engine, and others. Kit planes or plans built experimental aircraft were specifically designed to utilize these engines. The VW air-cooled engine does not require an expensive and often complex gear reduction unit to utilize a propeller at efficient cruise RPM. With its relative low cost and parts availability, many experimental aircraft are designed around the VW engines.

Formula V Air Racing uses aircraft designed to get maximum performance out of a VW powered aircraft resulting in race speeds above 160 mph.

Some aircraft that use the VW engine are:

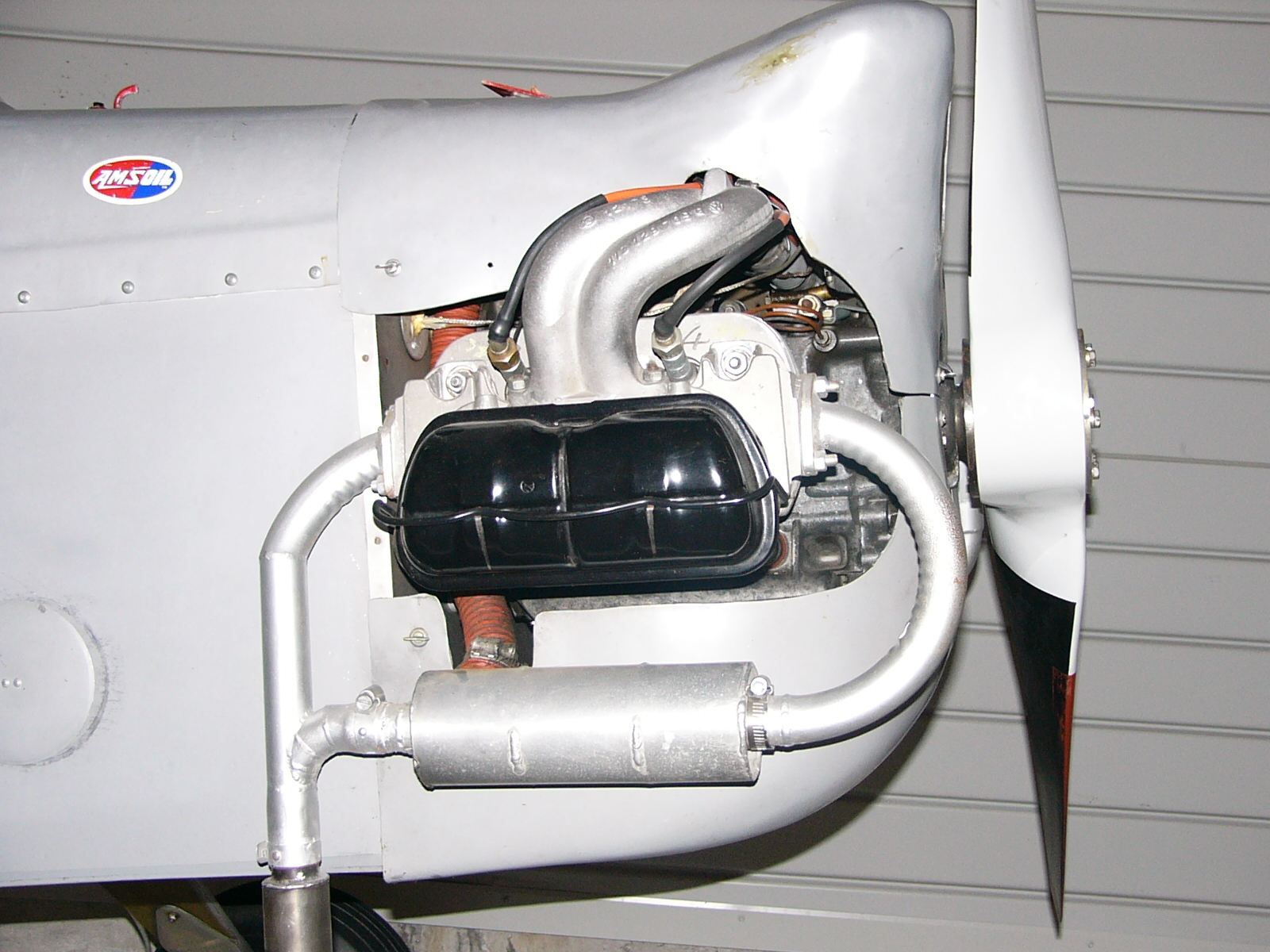
Volkswagen air-cooled engine installed in an Evans VP-1 Volksplane

- Aerosport Quail
- Airdrome Bleriot Model XI
- Airdrome Dream Fantasy Twin
- Airdrome Fokker DR-1
- Airdrome Fokker D-VI
- Airdrome Fokker D-VII
- Airdrome Fokker D-VIII
- Airdrome Nieuport 11
- Airdrome Nieuport 24
- Airdrome Taube
- AirLony Skylane
- Airmotive EOS 001
- Akaflieg München Mü23 Saurier
- Altair Coelho AC-11
- Alvarez Polliwagen
- Aurore MB 04 Souris Bulle
- Bensen B-8
- BK Fliers BK-1
- Bounsall Super Prospector
- Boyd G.B.1
- Bradley Aerobat
- Cassutt Special
- Circa Reproductions Nieuport 11
- Circa Reproductions Nieuport 17
- Corby Starlet
- Denney Kitfox
- Druine Turbulent
- Evans VP-1 Volksplane
- Evans VP-2 Volksplane
- Falconar F9A
- Falconar F11 Sporty
- Fisher Avenger V
- Fisher Youngster
- Flaglor Sky Scooter
- Flitzer Z-21
- Great Plains Easy Eagle
- Grob G 109
- Harmon Der Donnerschlag
- Harmon Mister America
- Hummel H5
- Hummel Ultracruiser Plus
- JDT Hi-MAX
- JPM 01 Médoc
- Junqua Ibis
- Just Superstol
- Mignet Pou-du-Ciel
- Mini-Hawk Tiger-Hawk
- JDT V-MAX
- Kolb M3X
- Leger Pataplume 1
- Light Miniature Aircraft LM-5
- Milholland Legal Eagle – half VW and full Type 1 VW engines
- Monnett Sonerai
- Nicollier Menestrel
- Parker Jeanie's Teenie
- Parrish Dart
- Pazmany PL-4A
- Plumb BGP-1
- Pober Pixie
- Pottier P.40
- Pottier P.130 Coccinelle
- Preceptor STOL King
- Preceptor Ultra Pup
- Preceptor Stinger
- QAC Quickie Q2
- RagWing RW1 Ultra-Piet – half VW and full Type 1 VW engines
- RagWing RW7 Duster – half VW and full Type 1 VW engines
- Rand Robinson KR-1
- Rand Robinson KR-2S
- Scheibe Falke
- Sisler SF-2A Cygnet
- Sonex Aircraft Onex
- Sonex Aircraft Sonex
- Southern Aeronautical Renegade
- Southern Aeronautical Scamp
- Stewart Headwind
- Stolp SA-500 Starlet
- Taiwan Dancer TD-3
- Tervamäki ATE-3
- Tipsy Nipper
- Taylor Monoplane
- Thatcher CX4
- Vidor Champion V
- Viking Dragonfly
- Zenair CH 100

==== Half VW ====
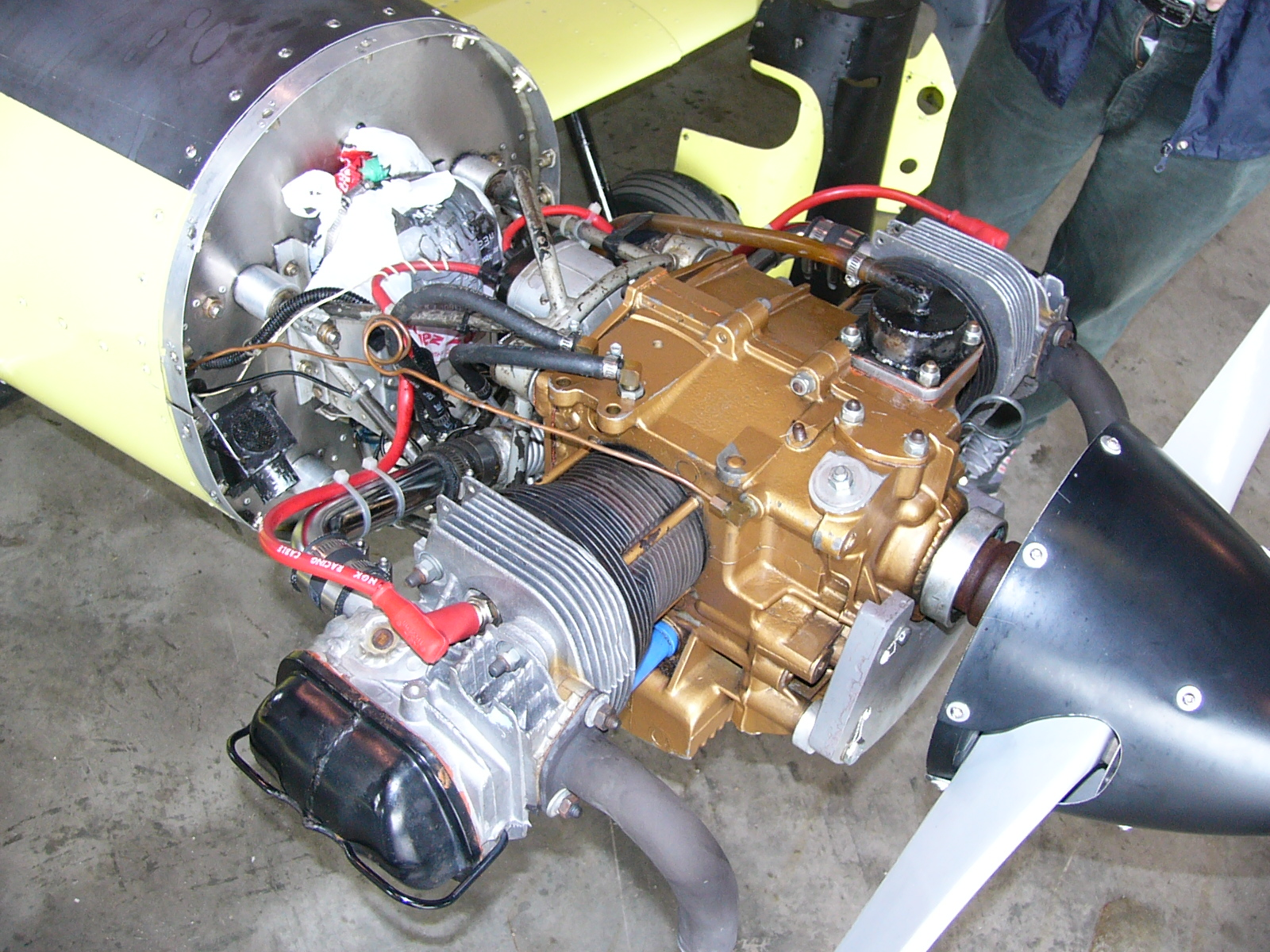
Half Volkswagen engine mounted in a Hummel Bird

For aircraft use, a number of experimenters, who were seeking a small, two-cylinder, four-stroke engine, began cutting Type 1 VW engine blocks in half, creating a two-cylinder, horizontally opposed engine. The resulting engine produces 30 to 38 hp (22 to 28 kW). Plans and kits have been made available for these conversions.

One such conversion is the Carr Twin, designed by Dave Carr, introduced in January 1975, in the Experimental Aircraft Association's Sport Aviation magazine. The design won the John Livingston Award for its outstanding contribution to low cost flying and also was awarded the Stan Dzik Memorial Award for outstanding design.

Other examples include the Total Engine Concepts MM CB-40 and Better Half VW.

Some aircraft that use the Half VW engine are:

- Belite Ultra Cub
- Duane's Hangar Ultrababy
- Hummel Bird
- Hummel Ultracruiser
- Milholland Legal Eagle – half VW and full Type 1 VW engines
- Pop's Props Pinocchio
- Preceptor N3 Pup
- RagWing RW1 Ultra-Piet – half VW and full Type 1 VW engines
- RagWing RW4 Midwing Sport
- RagWing RW7 Duster – half VW and full Type 1 VW engines
- Spacek SD-1 Minisport
- Ultravia Pelican
