= Pottier P.130 Coccinelle =

French light aircraft

P.130 Coccinelle
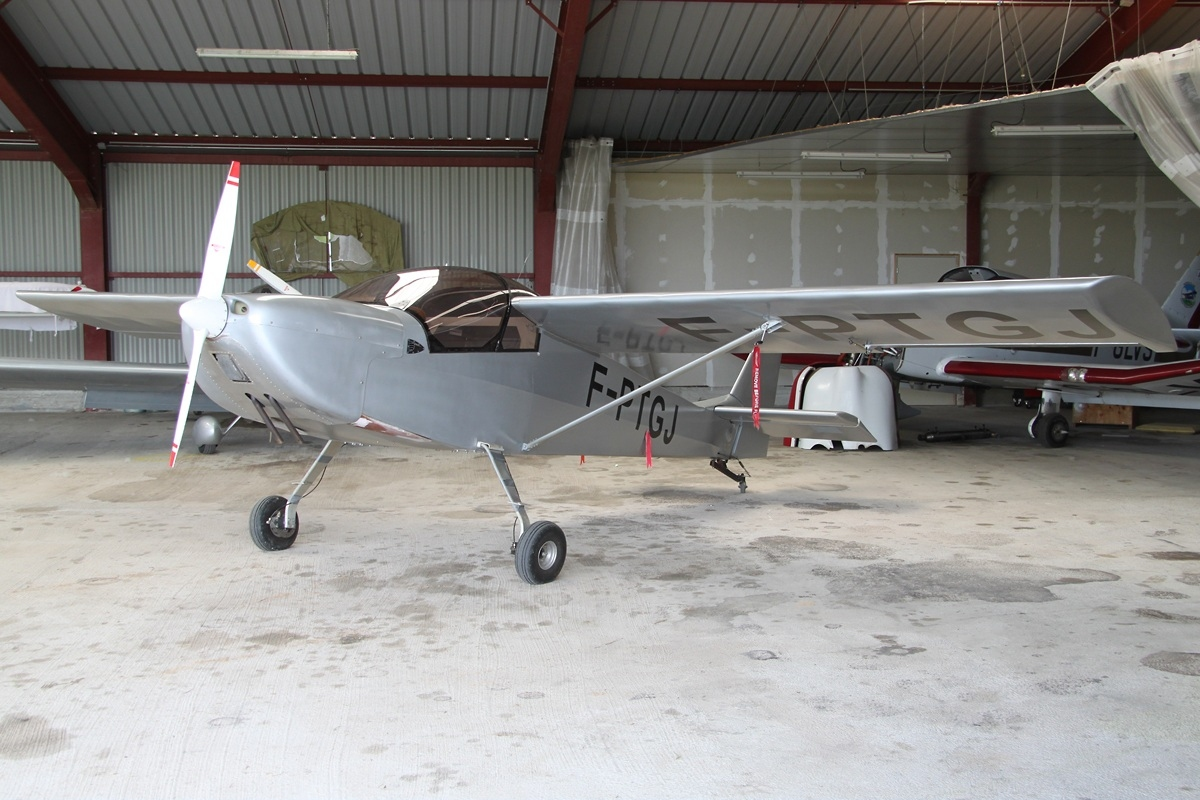
- P.130L Coccinelle

General information
- Type: Side-by-side sports aircraft
- National origin: France
- Designer: Jean Pottier
- Number built: 23 registered in Europe by 2014

History
- First flight: 1998
- Developed from: Pottier P.30 Pétrel

The Pottier P.130 Coccinelle (English: ladybird (US: ladybug)) is a French light aircraft originating from one designed, but not built, in the 1960s. Redeveloped thirty years later, it is a homebuilt, single engine two seater. More than twenty have been constructed.

== Design and development ==
In 1966 Jean Pottier designed the P.30 Pétrel. It would have been a single engine, small, shoulder wing monoplane, but it was never built. Thirty years later Pottier produced a revised version seating two side by side and designated the P.130 Coccinelle. This venture was supported by the RSA's Bleu Citron (English: Blue lemon) programme and the P.130 has sometimes been referred to as the Pottier Bleu Citron.

The Coccinelle is a simple wood framed, fabric covered monoplane, with shoulder mounted wings braced by a single strut each side from the lower fuselage longerons. The wings are essentially rectangular in plan, though with blunted forward tips, and have significant forward sweep. The balanced rudder is almost without a fin, though there is a shallow, triangular fillet in front of the rudder, which is large, straight edged and extends to the keel. The rectangular tailplane, mounted at the top of the fuselage, carries full span, rectangular plan elevators with a central cut-out to allow rudder movement.

The Coccinelle's fuselage has a rectangular section throughout and its profile is straight edged except under the engine, where it curves upwards. The side-by-side seats are ahead of the wing leading edge and largely enclosed under a one piece, rear hinged, part bubble type canopy. Behind this are further transparencies which can vary from builder to builder but extend rearwards a little way into the wing. Most Coccinelles have a tail wheel undercarriage with front wheels on thin, steel cantilever legs, though a tricycle undercarriage is an option. Some builders have added spats.

Following Pettier normal practice, the Coccinelle was intended for home building from his plans. These allow a choice between the P.130UL, meeting the ultralight certification requirements, or the normal P.130L. The 2014 French register shows that the latter is usually preferred. A variety of engines are suitable, including the Volkswagen air-cooled flat four with powers between 48–75 kW (65–100 hp) and the 60 kW (80 hp) JPX.

The prototype first flew in 1998 and by 2001 more than 60 were under construction in France. The European 2014 civil aircraft registers show 23 P.130s, 21 in France and 2 in Spain.

== Variants ==
P.130L Coccinelle
meeting normal light aircraft certification requirements
P.130UL Coccinelle
meeting ultralight requirements

== Specifications (65 hp Volkswagen engine) ==
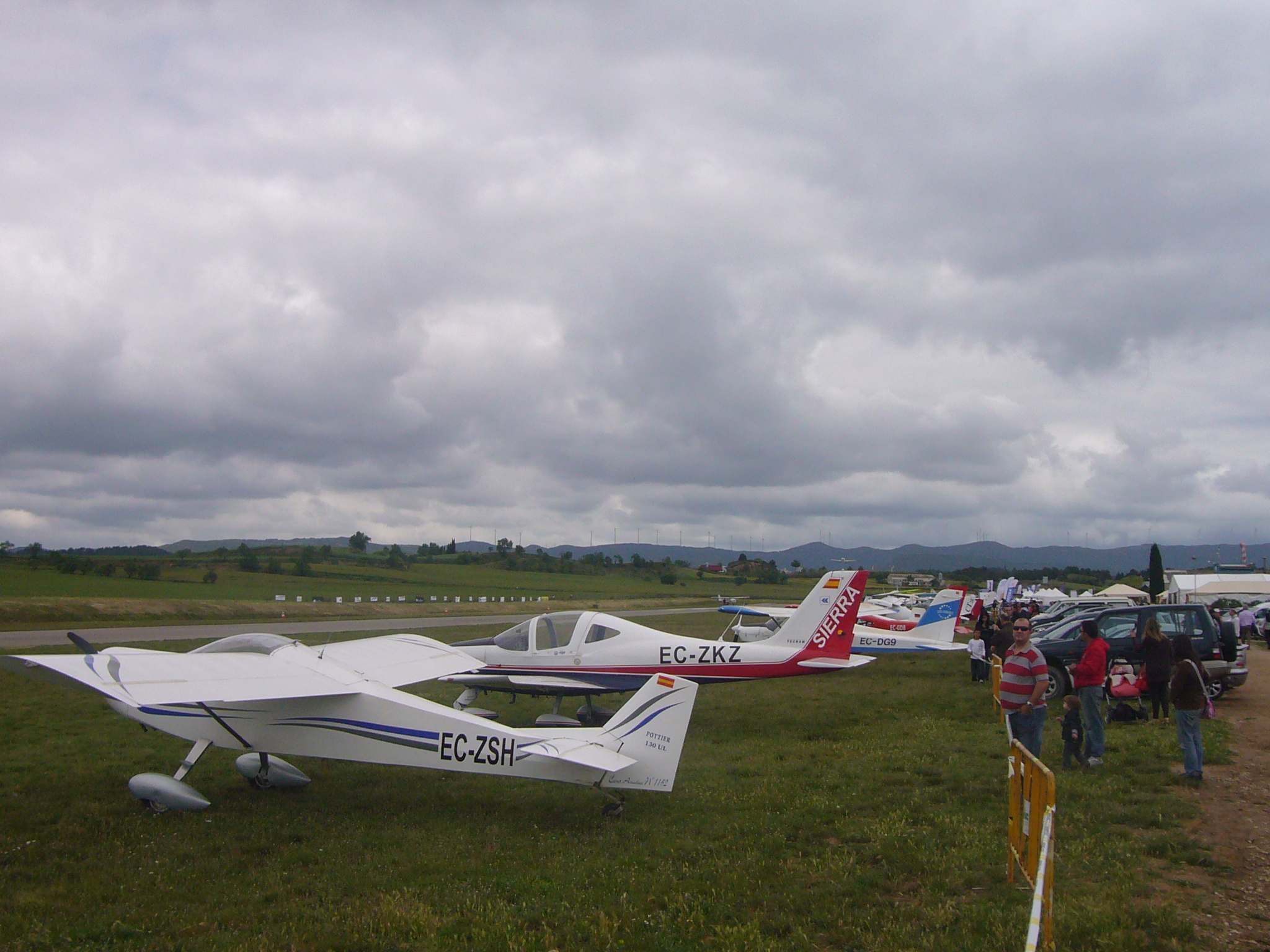
P.130UL Coccinelle in foreground

Data from Simpson (2001) pp.445

General characteristics

- Length: 6.9 m (22 ft 8 in)
- Wingspan: 8.1 m (26 ft 7 in)
- Height: 1.98 m (6 ft 6 in)
- Empty weight: 260 kg (573 lb)
- Gross weight: 500 kg (1,102 lb)
- Powerplant: 1 × 1600 cc Volkswagen air-cooled flat-four, 48 kW (65 hp)
- Propellers: 2-bladed

Performance

- Maximum speed: 195 km/h (121 mph, 105 kn)
- Cruise speed: 181 km/h (112 mph, 98 kn)
- Range: 480 km (300 mi, 260 nmi)
- Rate of climb: 4 m/s (790 ft/min) initial
