= Aircraft dope =

Aircraft fabric chemical finish

External videos
- Doping Techniques

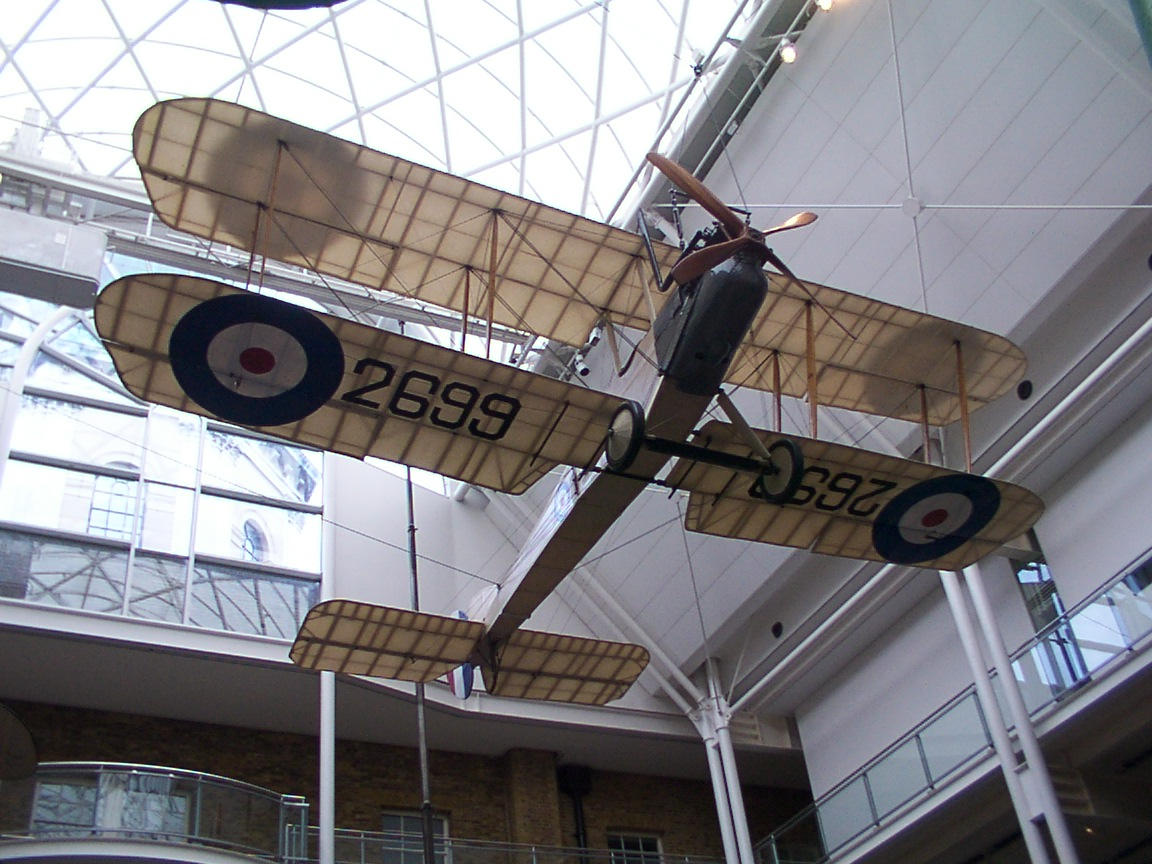
2699 a World War I Royal Aircraft Factory B.E.2 finished in a clear (non-coloured) dope

Aircraft dope is a plasticised lacquer that is applied to fabric-covered aircraft. It tightens and stiffens fabric stretched over airframes, which renders them airtight and weatherproof, increasing their durability and lifespan. The technique was in common use for full-size and flying models of aircraft.

== Attributes ==
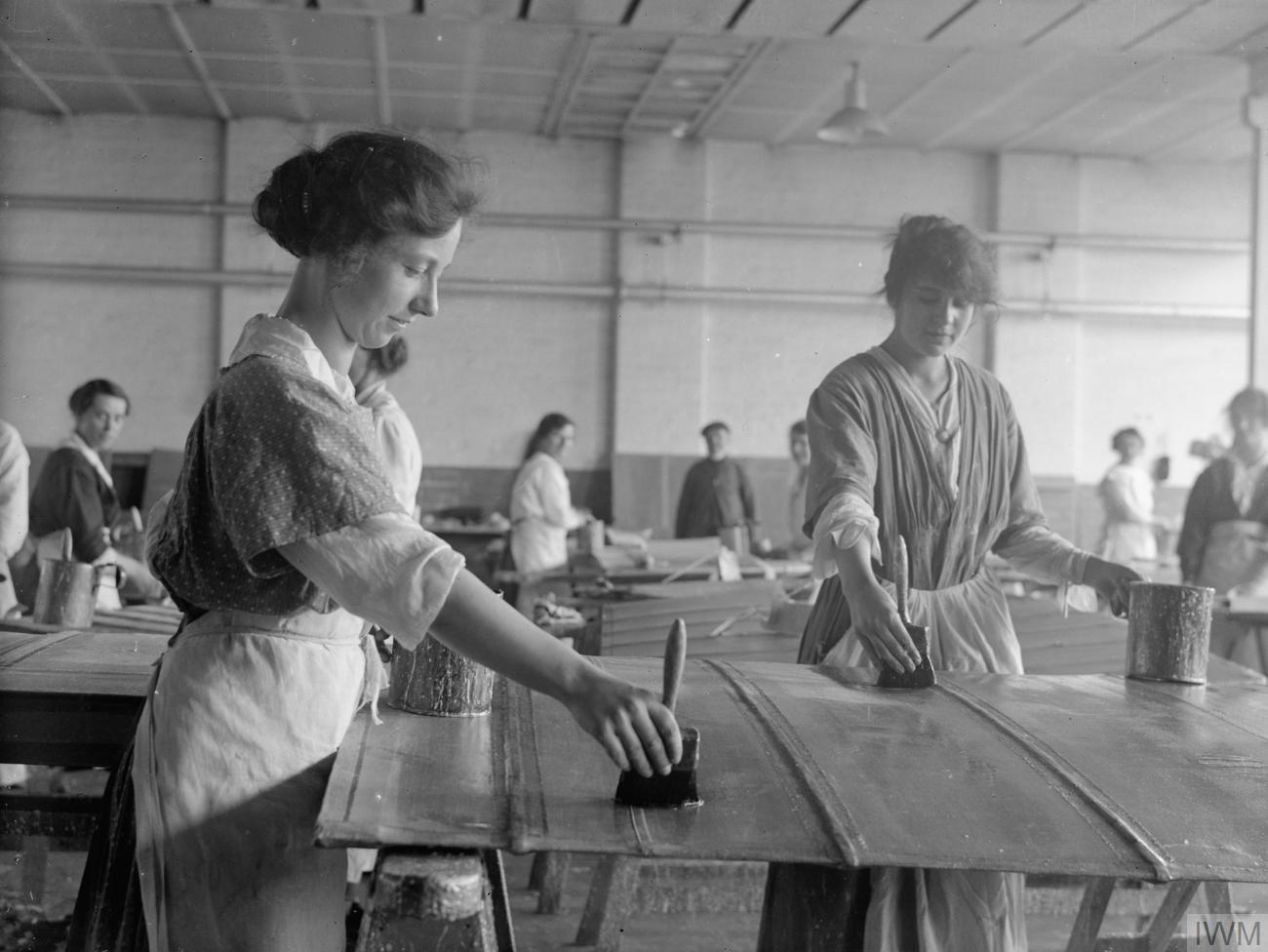
Workers doping the canvas on planes before painting, September 1918

Doping techniques have been employed in aircraft construction since the dawn of heavier-than-air flight; the fabric of the ground-breaking Wright Flyer had benefitted from doping, as did many of the aircraft that soon followed. Without the application of dope, fabric coverings lacked durability while being highly flammable, both factors rendering them far less viable. By the 1910s, a wide variety of doping agents had entered widespread use while entirely original formulas were being regularly introduced in the industry. Typical doping agents include nitrocellulose, cellulose acetate and cellulose acetate butyrate. Liquid dopes are often highly flammable; nitrocellulose, for instance, is also known as the explosive propellant "guncotton". Dopes often have colouring pigments added to facilitate even application, and are available in a wide range of colours.

Dope has been applied to various aircraft fabrics, such as madapollam; in more recent decades, it has also been applied to polyester and other fabrics with similar fine weave and absorbent qualities. Reportedly, polyester fabric coverings have become an industry-wide standard; the use of both cotton and linen fabrics have effectively been eliminated. In addition to changes in the materials that dope is applied to, the methods of application have also been refined to reduce shrinking, improve adherence and increase lifespan.

By the 1910s, it was recognised that, while the practice was highly beneficial, certain types of doping agents posed a risk to workers' health. While acetate and nitrate-based dopes were believed to pose little risk by themselves, the volatile compounds to dissolve them prior to application were poisonous. The medical profession across several nations became aware of this threat just prior to the First World War, and promoted the need for adequate workplace ventilation as a mitigating measure in factories where doping was performed. In the United Kingdom specifically, studies were performed into the potential health impacts of various dopes, concluding that those produced to Royal Aircraft Factory specifications rendered them less liable to result in illness than several others. Investigations into health concerns surrounding dope were also conducted during the Second World War.

Due to more powerful engines and advanced aerodynamic techniques, aluminium (and subsequently composites) supplanted fabric as the primary material used in the aviation industry by the latter half of the 20th century. Various light aircraft, including gliders, home-built kits, and light sport aircraft, have continued to use fabrics. Thus doping techniques continue to be employed, albeit to a lesser degree than at the dawn of aviation. There are several covering methods that do not use dope coating processes, as alternative treatment methods have been devised. Identical materials and techniques must be used during maintenance as had been employed in construction; thus, traditionally built aircraft continue to use doping techniques throughout their operating lives.

== Accidents ==
Numerous accidents have occurred as a result of the incorrect use of doping techniques. Examples of common mistakes include mixing dope with other chemicals, using it on the wrong fabrics, or applying it to contaminated or improperly prepared surfaces.

During the investigation into the 1930 R101 airship disaster, it was determined that improper doping practices had resulted in the fabric of the airship having become brittle and easy to damage.

Among the hypotheses for the 1937 Hindenburg airship disaster, the Incendiary Paint Theory, presented by Addison Bain, is that a spark between inadequately grounded fabric cover segments of the Hindenburg started the fire, and that the spark had ignited the "highly flammable" outer skin doped with iron oxide and aluminum-impregnated cellulose acetate butyrate, which remain potentially reactive even after fully setting. The hypothesis has been disputed.

On 27 April 1995, 91-year-old aircraft designer, builder and significant figure in the homebuilt aircraft movement Steve Wittman and Paula Muir, Wittman's wife, were killed when their Wittman O&O Special broke up in flight due to delamination and separation of the wing fabric, resulting in wing aeroelastic flutter. The US National Transportation Safety Board investigation determined that the layers and types of doping that had been used on the aircraft did not have "the best adhesive qualities" and referred to "the Poly-Fiber Covering and Painting Manual" for proper processes to use.
