= Moscow attack =

Moscow attack may refer to:

- Fire of Moscow (1547) blamed on the tsar's maternal relatives from the Glinski family
- Sack of Moscow (1571) by Crimean Tatars
- Fire of Moscow (1812) concurrent with Napoleon's occupation
- Battle of Moscow (1941) during World War II
- Kremlin drone attack (May 2023)
- July–August 2023 Moscow drone attack
- 30 May 2023 Moscow drone strikes
- November 2024 Moscow drone attack

== See also ==
- Moscow terrorist attack (disambiguation)
