= Sonex Electric Sport Aircraft =

American electric aircraft

Electric Sport Aircraft

General information
- Type: Homebuilt aircraft
- Manufacturer: Sonex Aircraft
- Designer: Sonex Aircraft Hornet's Nest
- Status: Development ended

History
- First flight: 3 December 2010 (Waiex Test Bed)
- Developed from: Sonex Aircraft Xenos

The Sonex Electric Sport Aircraft (ESA) was a two-place (one place with additional batteries) aircraft design that was under development by Sonex Aircraft, using the 80 hp (60 kW) Sonex e-Flight electric system for thrust. Sonex designed this aircraft as a part of an attempt to develop alternate fuels, to ensure feasibility of inexpensive sport aviation in the future.

The last update on the project was put out by the company in 2011 and the webpage about it was removed in 2017.

== Design and development ==
The ESA was designed to use the Sonex e-Flight electric system, which was concurrently under development. The airframe was developed from the Xenos, and was not intended to compete with the other aircraft in the Sonex line. The initial flights, however, have used a Waiex airframe, and were centered around testing the electric power system. The aircraft was to be aluminum riveted, and features were to include a shortened wingspan and tail tips (in relation to the Xenos), aerobatic wing tips, 8' flaps instead of spoilers, and for the center of gravity, an auxiliary battery and controller in the tail cone.

The electrical system was 270 volts and 200 amps, and was intended to be adjustable to different power outputs. As of 2007, the brushless DC-Cobalt motor was designed be very lightweight, at only 50 lb (23 kg), to operate at 90% efficiency, and to use Lithium-ion and Lithium-polymer batteries.

For safety, the batteries were contained in "safety boxes", which were designed, in the event of a problem, to direct fire or explosion through designated holes, and to help cool the cells normally. In the final version, the batteries were intended able to be charged in the aircraft, while retaining the ability to be easily removed and swap them with other batteries. The design won the Lindberg Electric Aircraft Prize for the "Best Electric Aircraft Sub-System or Component Technology" at Airventure 2010, and at that time the first completion of a production aircraft was anticipated for the end of 2011.

== Specifications ==
Data from manufacturer’s website

General characteristics

- Crew: one
- Length: 19 ft 9 in (6.02 m)
- Wingspan: 35 ft 8 in (10.87 m)
- Wing area: 130 sq ft (12 m^{2})
- Empty weight: 920 lb (417 kg) - unknown whether empty weight includes the batteries.
- Gross weight: 1,320 lb (599 kg)
- Fuel capacity: 17kW-hr battery pack + optional 14kW-hr auxiliary battery (in lieu of passenger)
- Powerplant: 1 × e-flight Electric System Electric, 80 hp (60 kW)

Performance

- Stall speed: 43 mph (69 km/h, 37 kn)
- Never exceed speed: 170 mph (270 km/h, 150 kn)
- Range: 87 mi (140 km, 76 nmi) - range is 164 miles (143 nmi; 244 km) with auxiliary battery option
- Endurance: 50 min (96 min with auxiliary battery option)
- g limits: +4.4/-2.2
- Rate of climb: 800 ft/min (4.1 m/s)
- Lift-to-drag: 17:1
