= Sonex Aircraft Onex =

American kit-built airplane

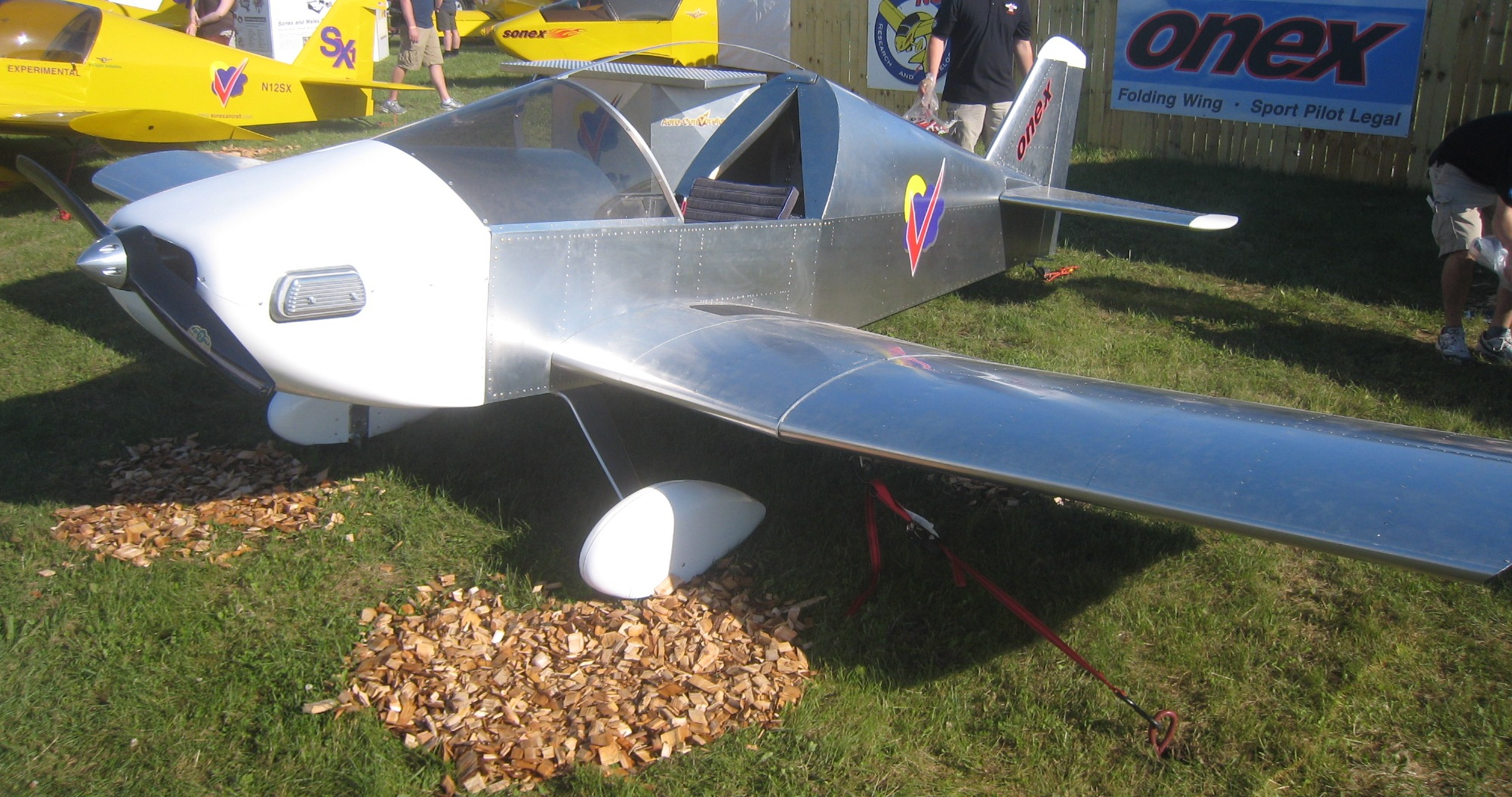
- Prototype of Sonex Aircraft Onex

General information
- Type: Homebuilt aircraft
- Manufacturer: Sonex Aircraft
- Designer: John Monnett
- Status: In production
- Number built: 53 incl 2 prototypes as of March 2019

History
- First flight: 27 January 2011
- Developed from: Sonex Aircraft Sonex

The Onex (pronounced "One-X" ) is an American single-seat, low-wing aircraft first flown on 27 January 2011 and currently being produced by Sonex Aircraft as a kit for amateur construction.

== Design and development ==
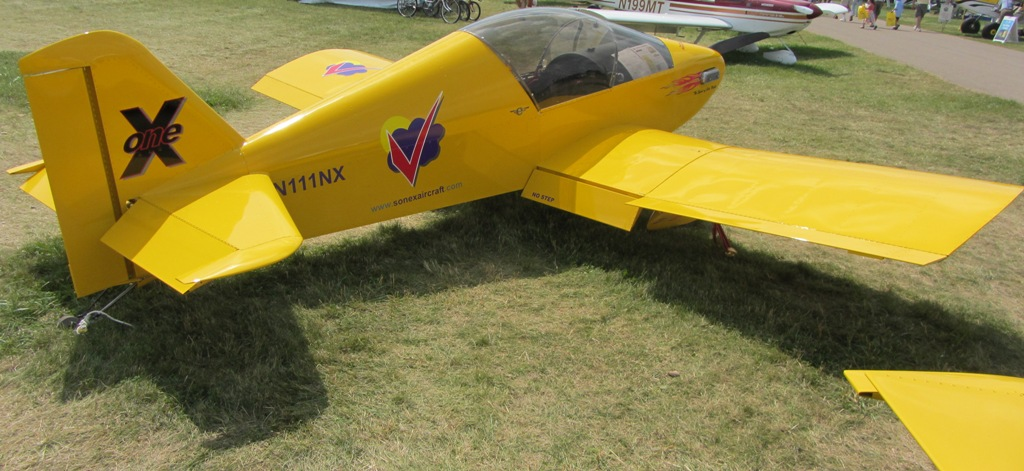
A prototype Onex

The Onex was designed to be economical, have aerobatic capabilities and folding wings, allowing storage in a standard 7 ft (2.1 m) high by 8 ft (2.4 m) wide residential garage. The aircraft has been designed to standard light aircraft FAR-23 static load requirements with the wings supporting more than 10,000 pounds in sandbags during the tests. Intended for the US experimental home-built and light-sport aircraft categories, in 2012 the company estimated the total price to purchase and build the aircraft to be around US$25,299, making it the least expensive of their kits. The FAA's National Kit Evaluation Team has approved construction checklists demonstrating compliance with the homebuilt requirement that the "major portion", or 51% of the aircraft, is completed by the builder, not the manufacturer. This also allows the owner to seek commercial help with construction.

The first prototype was flown with conventional landing gear with the first flight of the tricycle gear version taking place on October 5, 2011. The prototype was equipped with an AeroVee Volkswagen air-cooled engine.

In a February 2, 2011 webinar, Monett discussed many of technical aspects of the Onex, as well as providing a description of the early flight tests. The Onex is constructed from 6061 aluminum and features a single 15-gallon molded plastic fuel tank mounted in the fuselage, situated so the pilot can see the level of the fuel remaining. Monett claims that this type of tank is the safest and placing it in the fuselage, as opposed to in the wing, will reduce the chances of a fire in case of an accident. A further advantage of this configuration is that the fuel system will be gravity-fed and therefore not require a fuel pump, as it would if the tank were in the wings. Monett discussed the aim of simplicity and that a major goal is to reduce the parts count and thereby cost and weight. He also indicated that on the first test flight the aircraft climbed at 1200 ft per minute and was very responsive to the controls. Monett stated also that he had done some cursory testing of the flaps and found the 45° flap position to be very effective.

In a progress update on January 26, 2012, Sonex stated that more than 50 kits had been shipped before the new year, and some were nearing completion.

== Specifications (Onex with regular span wing) ==
Data from manufacturer’s website

General characteristics

- Crew: one
- Length: 16 ft 5 in (5.0 m)
- Wingspan: 20 ft 0 in (6.10 m)
- Wing area: 84.4 sq ft (7.84 m^{2})
- Airfoil: NACA 64-415
- Empty weight: 600 lb (272 kg)
- Gross weight: 950 lb (431 kg)
- Fuel capacity: 15 US gallons (56.8 liters)
- Powerplant: 1 × AeroVee four cylinder, four-stroke, Volkswagen air-cooled engine, 80 hp (60 kW)

Performance

- Cruise speed: 155 mph (249 km/h, 135 kn) at 8,000 ft (2,400 m).
- Stall speed: 45 mph (72 km/h, 39 kn)
- Never exceed speed: 216 mph (348 km/h, 188 kn)
- Range: 535 mi (861 km, 465 nmi)
- Service ceiling: 16,000 ft (4,900 m) (calculated service ceiling)
- g limits: +6/-3 at gross weight
- Rate of climb: 700 ft/min (3.6 m/s) to 900 ft/min (4.6 m/s)
- Lift-to-drag: 10:1
- Power/mass: 11.875 lb/hp (7.223 kg/kW)

== See also ==
Related development

- Sonex Aircraft Sonex
- Sonex Aircraft SubSonex

Aircraft of comparable role, configuration, and era

- Parker Jeanie's Teenie
- BK Fliers BK-1
- Thatcher CX4
- Silence Twister
