= Moscow terrorist attack =

Moscow terrorist attack may refer to:

- 1977 Moscow bombings
- 1999 Russian apartment bombings in Moscow
- Moscow theater hostage crisis (2002) terrorist attack
- 2004 Moscow Metro bombings (disambiguation)
- 2010 Moscow Metro bombings terrorist attack
- Domodedovo International Airport bombing (2011)
- Crocus City Hall attack (2024)

== See also ==
- Moscow attack (disambiguation)
