= Mugin UAV Mugin =

Chinese unmanned aerial vehicle

Mugin
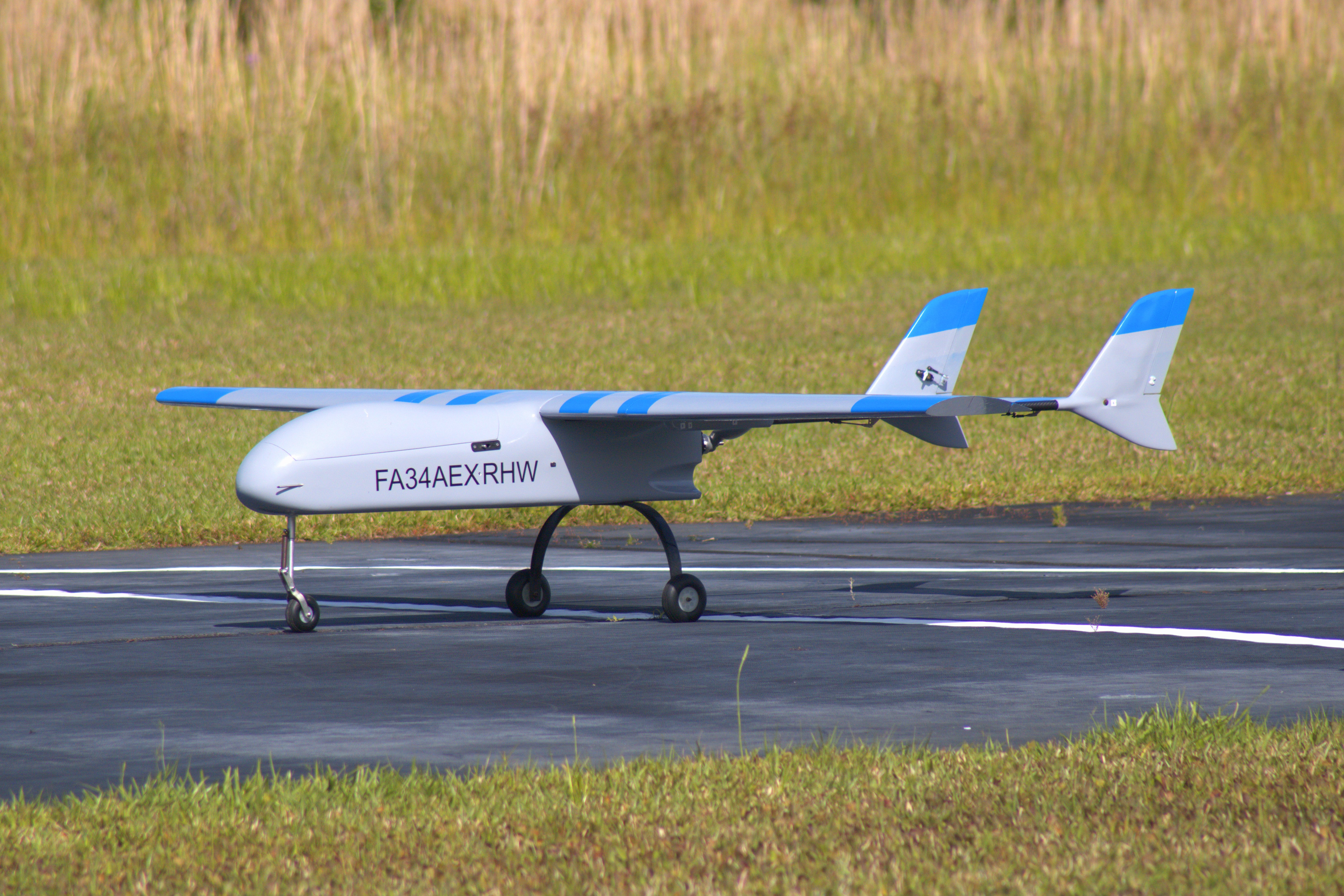
- Mini Mugin H-Tail "Apollo" of Embry–Riddle Aeronautical University. This aircraft has been modified with a pitot tube and an electric motor.

General information
- Type: Unmanned aerial vehicle
- National origin: China
- Manufacturer: Mugin UAV
- Primary users: Russian Armed Forces Armed Forces of Ukraine; Nigerian Air Force

The Mugin is a series of twin-boom fixed-wing unmanned aerial vehicles built by Mugin UAV in China. The Mugin gained notoriety during the Russo-Ukrainian War, in which both sides used the drone for various purposes.

== Operational history ==
In November 2021, Somali security forces seized six Mugin-2s imported from Turkey over fears that they were intended to be used in a attacks.

The Mugin saw use by both Russian and Ukrainian forces during the Russian invasion of Ukraine. In February 2023, Ukrainian soldiers shot down what appeared to be a Mugin-4 carrying an OF-62 high-explosive fragmentation projectile. In March 2023, soldiers of the 111th Territorial Defense Brigade shot down a Russian Mugin-5 Pro with AK-47s. The soldiers had been alerted to the launch of the drone by agents in Russian-occupied territory and later found it flying at a low altitude. An examination of the downed drone revealed that it was likely intended to be used as a loitering munition as it was filled with approximately 44 lb (20 kg) of explosives, which were subsequently safely detonated by the Ukrainian soldiers.

Ukrainian forces reportedly used Mugin-5 drones presumably for surveillance inside Russian-occupied territory. Ukrainian Mugin-5s were also used in an attack on the Black Sea Fleet headquarters in Sevastopol in August 2022, and were speculated to have been used in the Kremlin drone attack in May 2023.

In response to the military use of its drones, Mugin UAV released a statement in March 2023 condemning such use and stated that they had ceased all sales to Russia and Ukraine.

== Variants ==
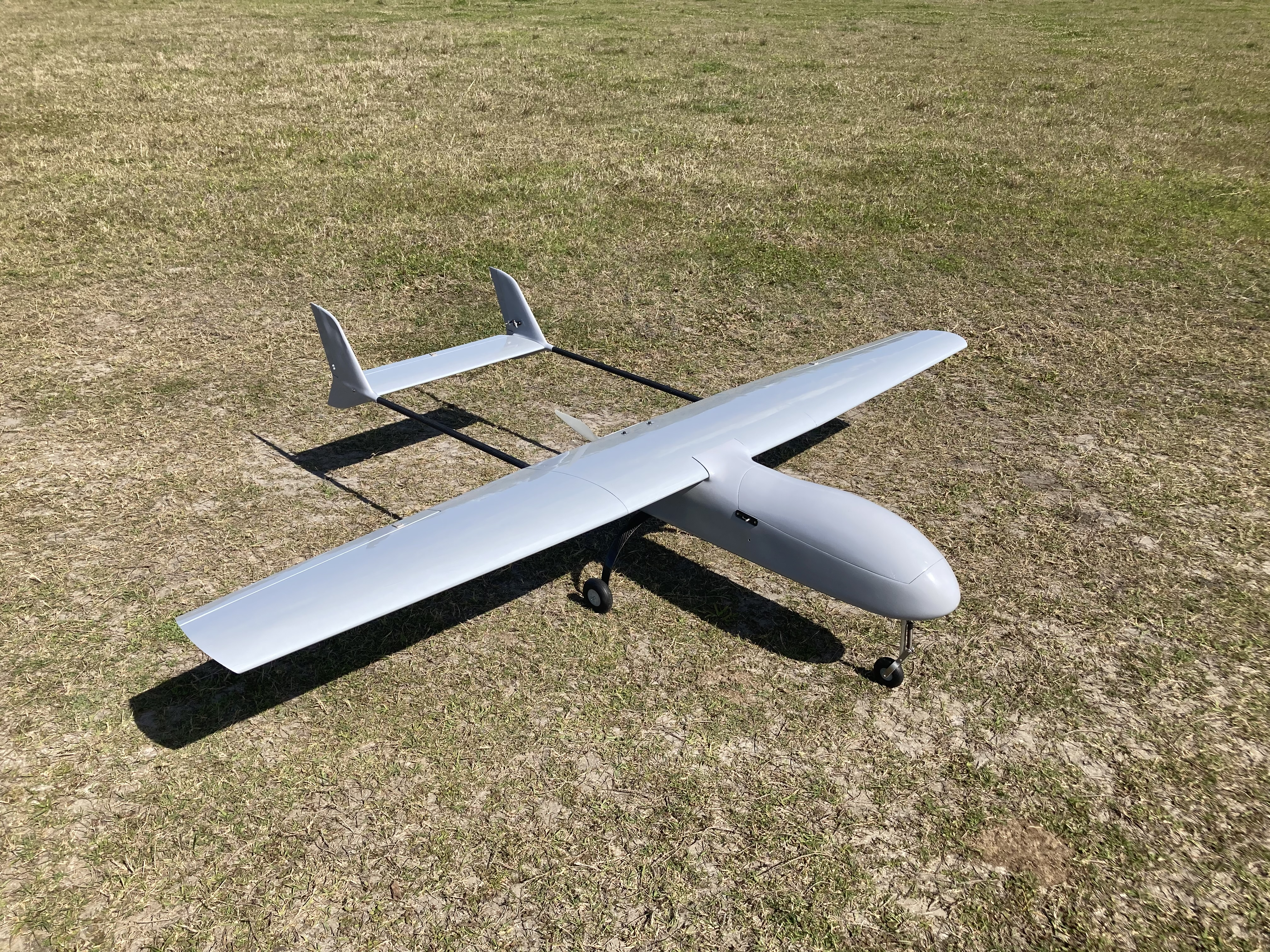
Mini Mugin H-Tail

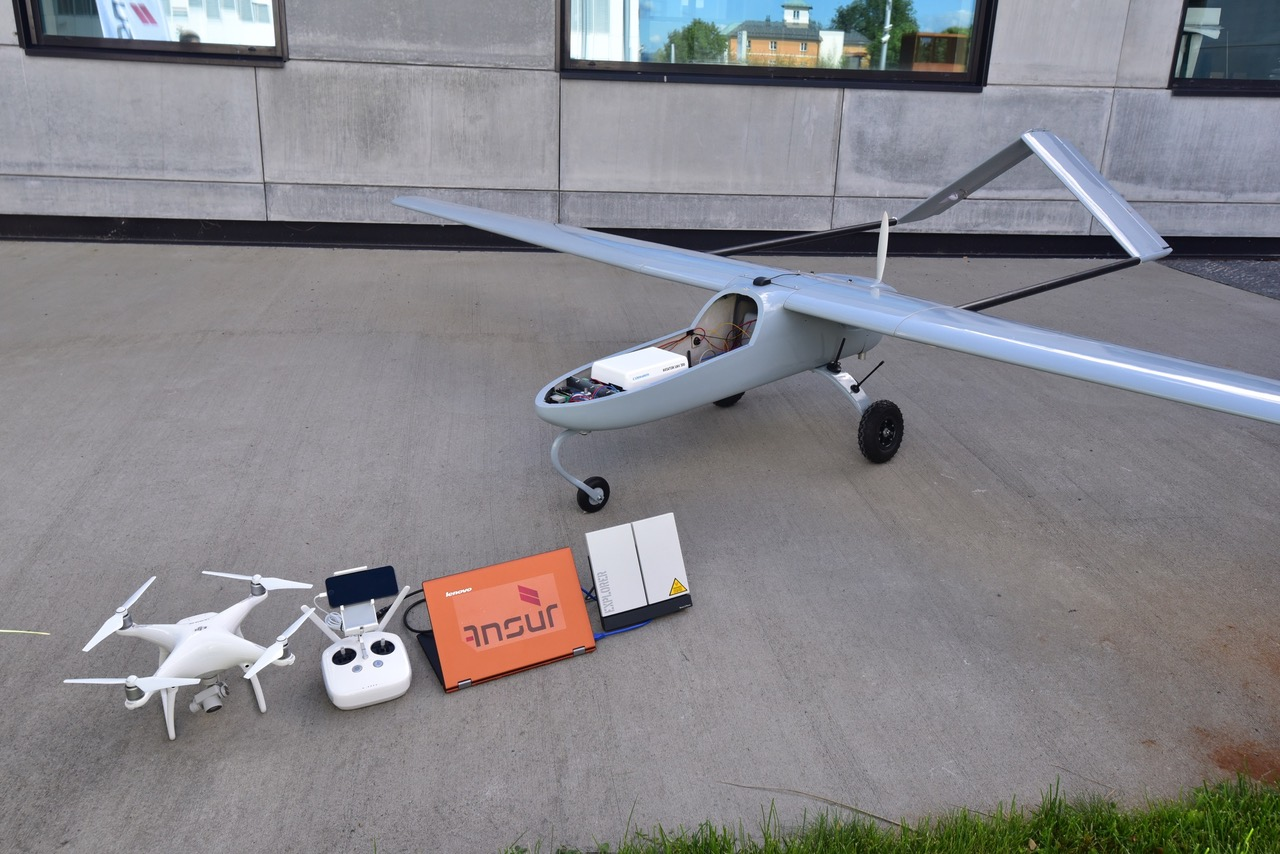
Mugin V-Tail with its payload cover removed beside a DJI Phantom 4

Mini Mugin
Conventional takeoff variant with a 2,600 mm (8.5 ft) wingspan. Built in both "H-Tail" (twin tail) and "V-Tail" (inverted V-tail) configurations and intended for 20-35cc gasoline engine.
Mugin-2 Pro
VTOL variant with a 2,930 mm (9.61 ft) wingspan, an "H-Tail" configuration, and powered by either an electric motor or gasoline engine.
Mugin-3
Variant with a 3,220 mm (10.56 ft) or 3,600 mm (11.8 ft) wingspan and powered by a DLE60 engine. The 3,220 mm variant is built in a conventional takeoff "V-Tail" configuration, while the 3,600 mm variant has been built in both conventional and VTOL configurations, both with an "H-Tail". In March 2019, the material of the VTOL variant was changed from wood to fiberglass, reducing the drone's weight from 14.6 kg (32 lb) to 13 kg (29 lb).
Mugin-3 Pro
Variant of the Mugin-3 with a carbon fiber construction. Built in two versions; a 3,220 mm (10.56 ft) wingspan "V-Tail" conventional takeoff variant and a 3,600 mm (11.8 ft) wingspan "V-Tail" VTOL variant.
Mugin-4
Conventional takeoff variant with a 4,500 mm (14.8 ft) wingspan.
Mugin-4 Pro
VTOL variant of the Mugin-4 with a carbon fiber construction. Built in two versions; one with a 4,720 mm (15.49 ft) wingspan and a "2023 Edition" with a 4,000 mm (13 ft) wingspan.
Mugin-5 Pro
Variant with a 5,000 mm (16 ft) wingspan and a carbon fiber construction. Built in three versions; a conventional takeoff variant, a VTOL variant with four lift motors, and a VTOL variant with eight lift motors.
Mugin-6 Pro
Variant with a 6,000 mm (20 ft) wingspan and a carbon fiber construction. Built in two versions; a conventional takeoff variant, and a VTOL variant. The conventional landing variant features disc brakes.
Mugin EV350
Electric VTOL variant with a 3,500 mm (11.5 ft) wingspan.
Mugin EV350M
Aerial mapping variant of the Mugin EV350.
Mugin EV460
Electric VTOL variant with a 4,600 mm (15.1 ft) wingspan.

== Operators ==
Nigeria

- The 401st Flying Training School of the Nigerian Air Force has used the Mugin for training purposes. The school temporarily ceased operations with the Mugin in 2017 due to a lack of spare parts, but resumed operations in June 2019.

Russia

- The Russian Armed Forces has used the Mugin as a loitering munition during its invasion of Ukraine.

Ukraine

- The Armed Forces of Ukraine has used the Mugin-5 for surveillance and as a loitering munition during the Russia invasion.

== Specifications (Mugin-5 Pro VTOL, eight lift motors) ==
Data from Mugin UAV

General characteristics

- Capacity: 25 kg (55 lb)
- Length: 3.5 m (11 ft 6 in)
- Wingspan: 5 m (16 ft 5 in)
- Width: 0.375 m (1 ft 3 in) (fuselage)
- Height: 0.99 m (3 ft 3 in)
- Wing area: 2.615 m^{2} (28.15 sq ft)
- Empty weight: 34 kg (75 lb)
- Max takeoff weight: 100 kg (220 lb)
- Fuel capacity: 30 L (7.9 US gal)
- Powerplant: 1 × DLE 222 gasoline engine (recommended)
- Powerplant: 8 × T-motor V13 electric VTOL motors (recommended)
- Propellers: 2-bladed forward propeller

Performance

- Maximum speed: 144 km/h (89 mph, 78 kn)
- Cruise speed: 126 km/h (78 mph, 68 kn)
- Stall speed: 86.4 km/h (53.7 mph, 46.7 kn)
- Range: 800 km (500 mi, 430 nmi)
- Endurance: 7 hours

== See also ==
Aircraft of comparable role, configuration, and era

- HESA Shahed 136
- NASC TigerShark XP
