= Viking 110 =

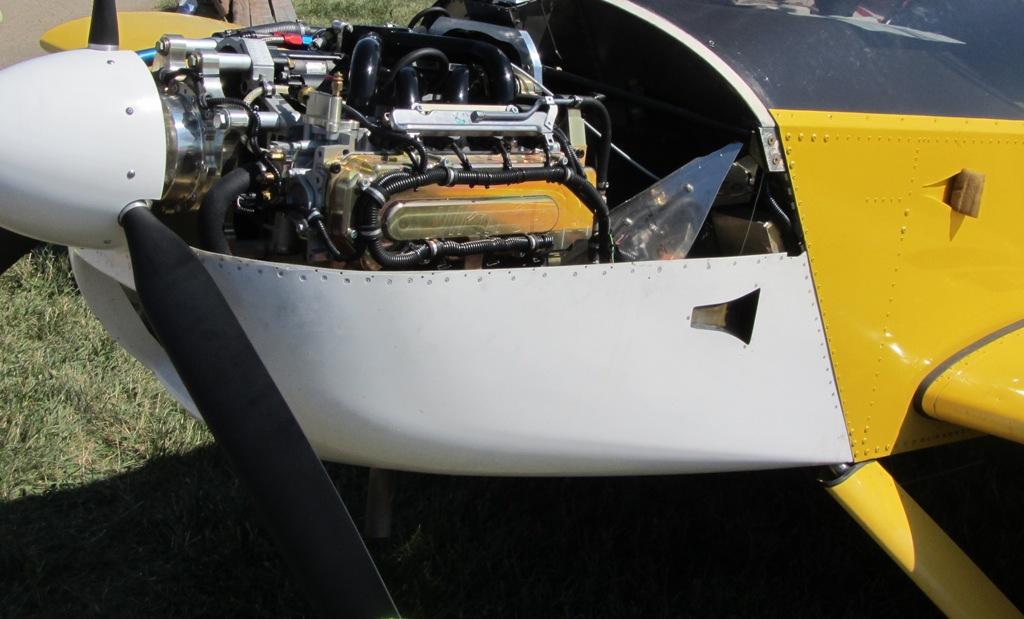
- Viking engine installation in a Sonex
- Type: Piston aircraft engine
- Manufacturer: Viking Aircraft Engines
- Designer: Jan Eggenfellner
- First run: 2009
- Developed from: Honda Fit

The Viking 110 is a 110 hp aircraft engine that was developed from Honda Fit automotive engine components by Viking Aircraft Engines of Edgewater, Florida.

== Design and development ==
The aluminum block Viking 110 has electronic ignition and multi-port fuel injection. It was introduced in 2009 and is based upon the 2009 model Honda Fit automotive engine. It produces 110 hp (82 kW) through a mechanical gear reduction drive with helical gears, with a reduction ratio of 2.33:1. A Warp Drive Inc propeller is recommended. The design was later developed into the Viking 130, producing 130 hp (97 kW) and which replaced the 110 in production.

== Operational history ==
By August 2016 the company had delivered 100 engines and had 25 reported flying.

== Applications ==
- Just Highlander
- Progressive Aerodyne SeaRey
- Sonex Aircraft Sonex
- Van's RV-12
- Zenith CH-601
- Zenith CH-650
- Zenith CH-701
- Zenith CH-750

== Specifications (Viking 130) ==
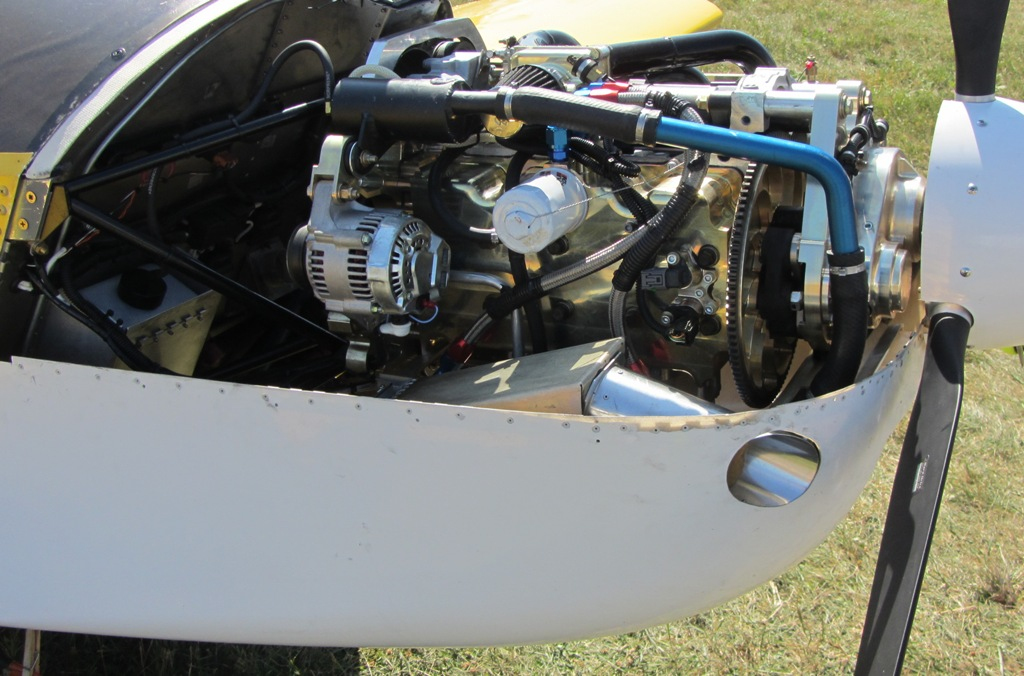
Viking 110 Sonex Installation

Data from Manufacturer

=== General characteristics ===
- Type: Inline, four cylinder, gear-reduced, liquid-cooled piston aircraft engine
- Bore: 73 mm (2.87 in)
- Stroke: 90 mm (3.54 in)
- Displacement: 1,497 cc (91 cu in)
- Length: 24.5 in (62.23 cm)
- Width: 22.0 in (55.88 cm)
- Height: 218.0 in (553.72 cm)
- Dry weight: 178 lb (81 kg)
- Designer: Jan Eggenfellner

=== Components ===
- Cooling system: liquid
- Reduction gear: helical gear, 2.33:1

=== Performance ===
- Power output: 110 hp (82 kW)
- Compression ratio: 10.4:1

== See also ==
Comparable engines

- D-Motor LF39
- Jabiru 3300
- Lycoming IO-233
- Rotax 912

Related lists

- List of aircraft engines
