= NASC TigerShark XP =

American unmanned aerial vehicle

TigerShark XP
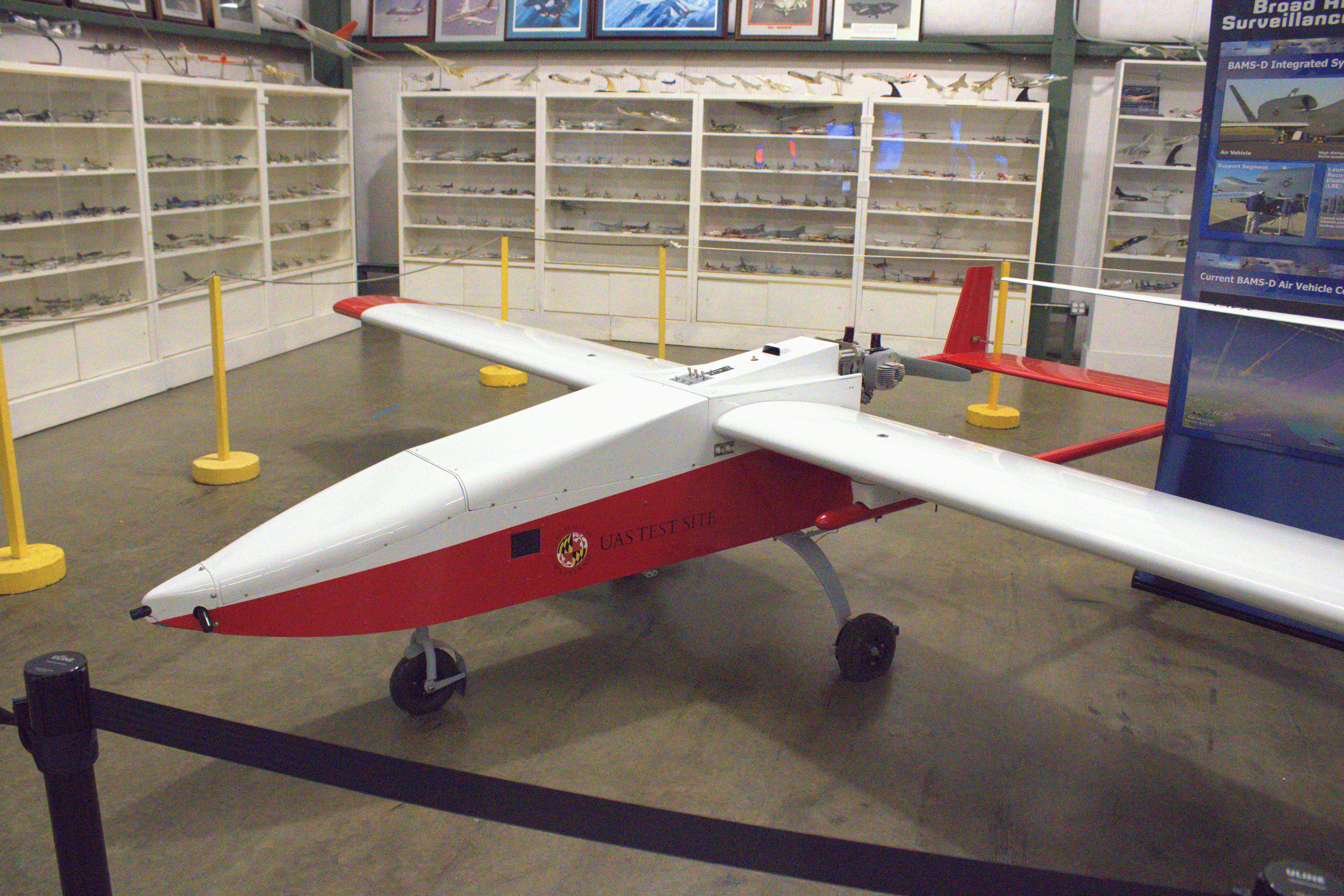
- TigerShark XP at the Patuxent River Naval Air Museum

General information
- Type: Unmanned aerial vehicle
- National origin: United States
- Manufacturer: NASC

The TigerShark XP is an unmanned aerial vehicle developed by Navmar Applied Sciences Corporation.

== Specifications ==
- Wingspan of 22 feet
- Gross Weight 515lbs.
- Payload Capacity of 100lbs.
- Flight Duration 10 hours.
- Engine 32 Hp Herbrandson 372cc two stroke.
- Autopilot Fully Autonomous Piccolo II

== See also ==
Aircraft of comparable role, configuration, and era

- Mugin UAV Mugin
