= Sonex Aircraft Teros =

Teros
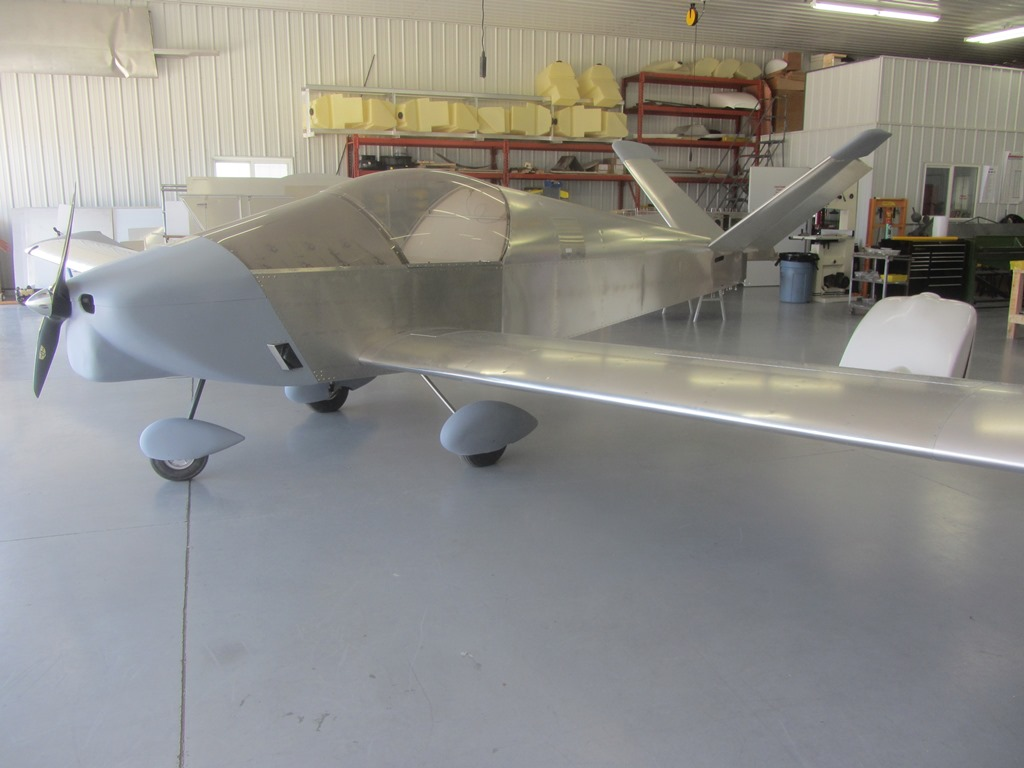
- NASC Teros

General information
- Type: UAV Group 4/5
- Manufacturer: Navmar Applied Sciences Corporation
- Status: In Development
- Primary user: ISR (Intelligence, surveillance and reconnaissance)

History
- Developed from: Sonex Aircraft Waiex

The Teros is a UAV developed by Navmar Applied Sciences Corporation.

== Description ==
The NASC Teros UAS is a single-engine, low wing, V tail monoplane developed by Navmar Applied Sciences Corporation in collaboration with Sonex using the Sonex built Aircraft Waiex as a base airframe, powered by a turbocharged AeroConversions AeroVee 2180 engine, with fixed tricycle landing gear.

== Specifications ==
General characteristics

- Powerplant: 1 × AeroConversions AeroVee 2180 four cylinder horizontally-opposed aircraft engine, 100 hp (75 kW)
