= Sonex Aircraft =

American homebuilt aircraft manufacturer

Sonex Aircraft, LLC
- Type: Private
- Industry: Aerospace
- Founded: 1998
- Founder: John Monnett
- Headquarters: Oshkosh, Wisconsin, United States
- Key people: Jeremy Monnett (Former CEO); Mark Schaible (CEO)
- Number of employees: 9
- Subsidiaries: AeroConversions engines
- Website: sonexaircraft.com

Sonex Aircraft, LLC is an American kit aircraft manufacturer located in Oshkosh, Wisconsin, producing kits for four all-metal homebuilt monoplanes. The company was founded in 1998 by John Monnett, who has designed the Monnett Sonerai sport aircraft series, Monnett Monerai sailplane, Monnett Moni motorglider, and Monnett Monex racer. Approximately 700 Sonex aircraft were reported flying by early 2026.

== History ==
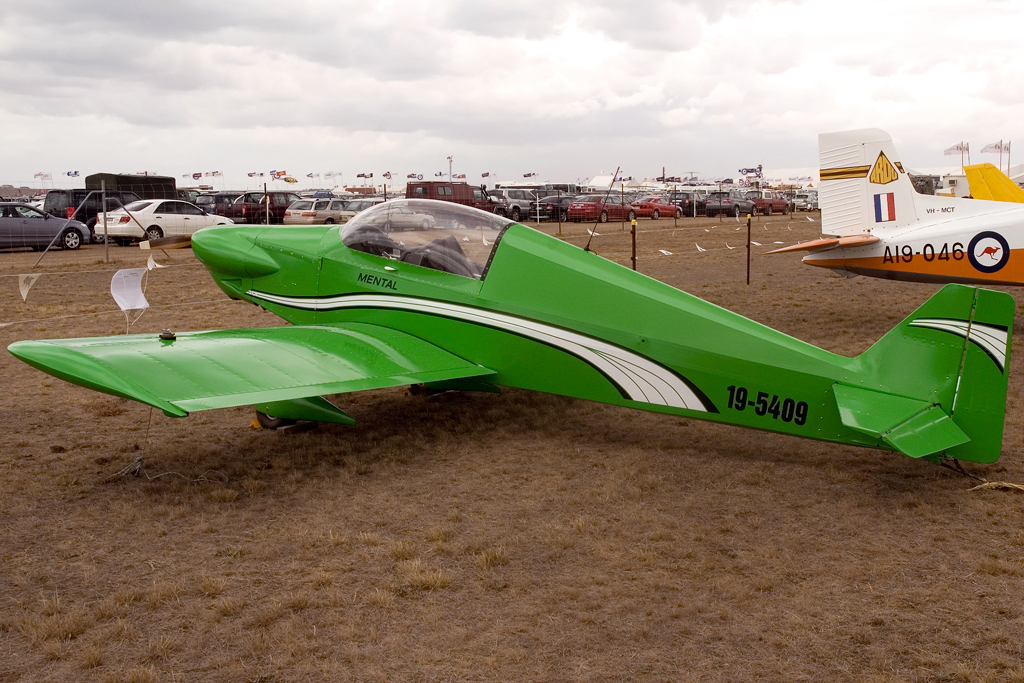
Sonerai IILS

The company was founded by John Monnett in 1998. (Note: Monnet had previously owned another company, Monnet Experimental Aircraft, from 1972 to 1986. By May 1995, he had also established Sky Struck Enterprises, which offered seminars on homebuilt aircraft construction. The latter would eventually be used to market the Sonex aircraft design before the eponymous company was founded.)

The company opened a flight center and a 5,600 sq ft (520 m^{2}) parts distribution warehouse in 2006. The following year, it displayed an electrically powered version of its Sonex aircraft.

In 2013, the FAA National Kit Evaluation Team (NKET) approved fast-build "51% rule" versions of the Sonex, Waiex, and Onex.

Sonex CEO, Jeremy Monnett, the son of founder John Monnett Jr. was killed in the crash of a Sonex SA in 2015.

In June 2018, John Monnett announced his plan to retire and sell the company. In January 2022, Sonex employee and general manager, Mark Schaible, purchased the assets of Sonex Aircraft LLC and Sonex Aerospace LLC, forming them into a new company, Sonex LLC. Schaible was the owner and president of the new company.

In December 2019 the John Monnett-designed Sonerai was acquired by Sonex Aircraft.

The company rolled out a prototype highwing aircraft in 2024.

In March 2026, bankruptcy of both Sonex LLC and Schaible were announced – with a last-minute offer to sell the company – citing rising costs, a severe downturn in sales, competition from their own used aircraft, cashflow issues, and bank pressure. However, by June the company had restarted production.

== Products ==
=== Aircraft ===
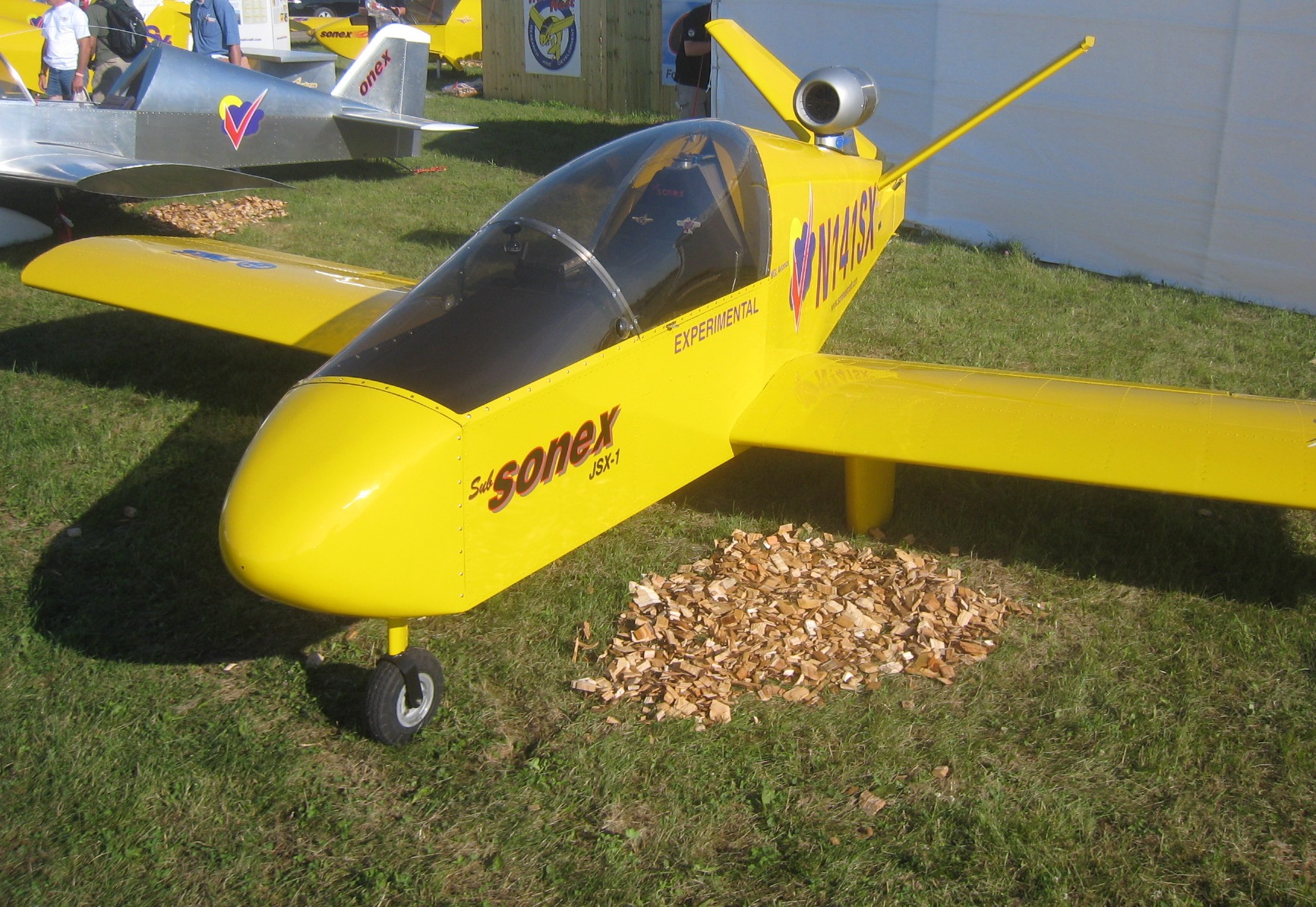
Sub Sonex JSX-1

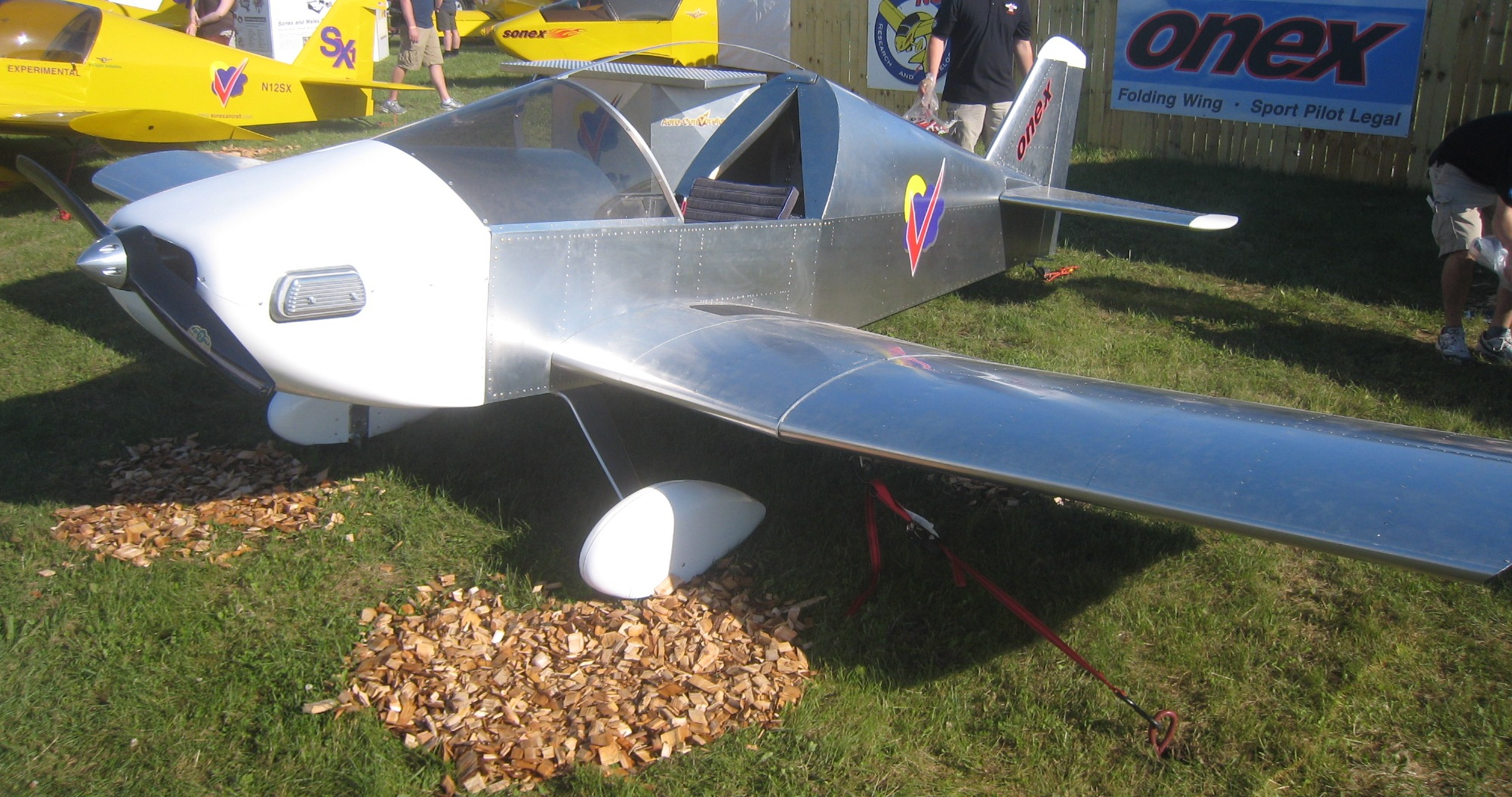
Sonex Onex

Model name	First flight	Number built	Type
Sonerai	1971		Single piston engine low-wing homebuilt airplane
Sonex	2000 (customer built)	500 by 2014	Single piston engine low-wing homebuilt airplane
Waiex	2003		Single piston engine low-wing homebuilt airplane with Y-tail
Xenos	2003		Single piston engine low-wing homebuilt motor glider
Onex	2011		Single piston engine single-seat low-wing homebuilt airplane
ESA			Unbuilt single electric engine low-wing homebuilt airplane
SubSonex JSX-1	2011		Single jet engine low-wing homebuilt airplane
SubSonex JSX-2	2014		Single jet engine low-wing homebuilt airplane
Teros	2015		Single piston engine low-wing unmanned aerial vehicle
Sierra Hotel			Single piston engine high-wing homebuilt airplane

=== Engines ===
Company subsidiary AeroConversions manufactures the AeroConversions AeroVee Engine, a custom aircraft implementation of the Volkswagen air-cooled engine.

== Hornet's Nest ==
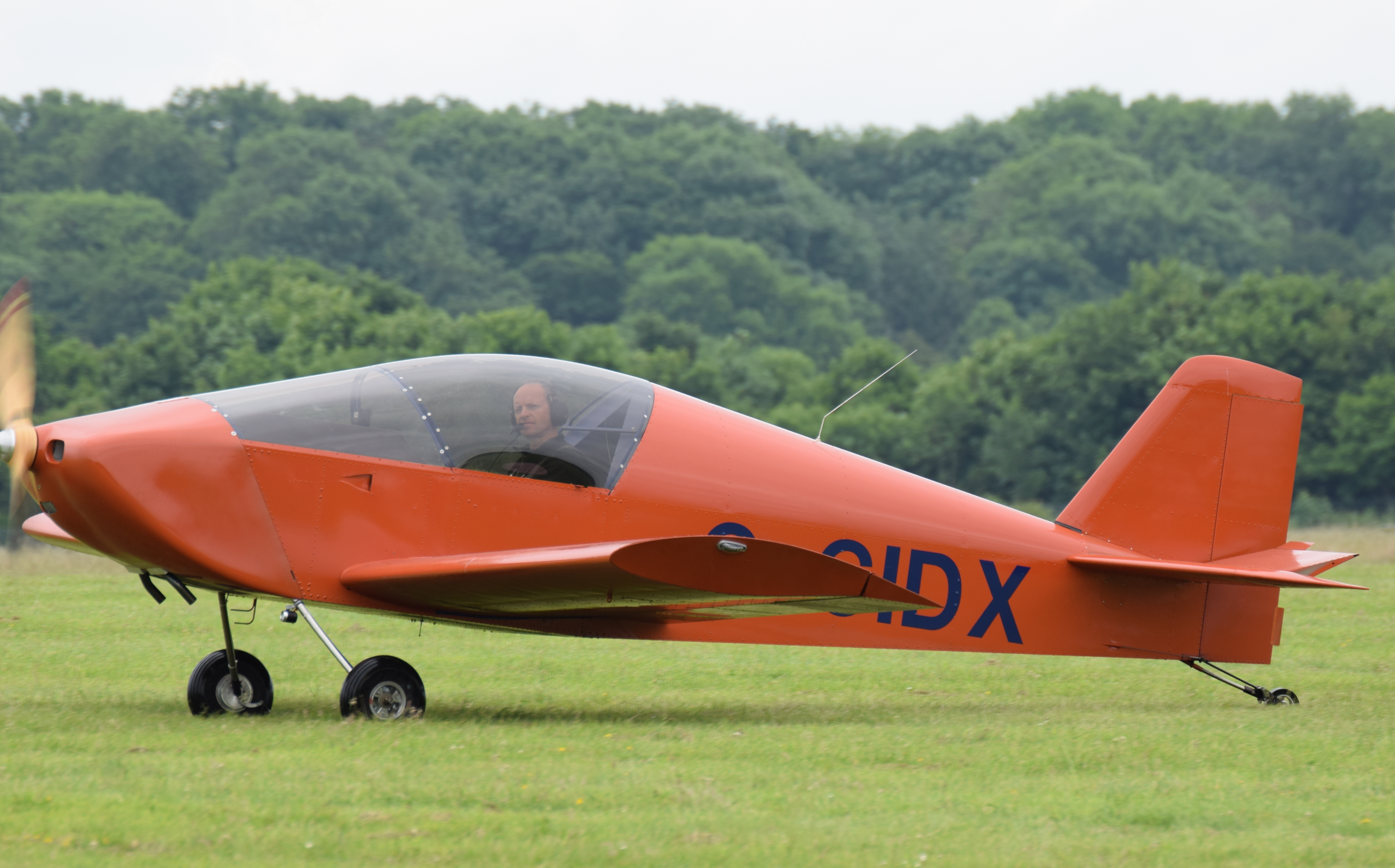
Sonex at Cotswold Airport, Gloucestershire, England, 2016

The Hornet's Nest is the research and development arm of Sonex LLC.

=== E-flight ===
At AirVenture 2007, Sonex Aircraft announced a project to work on innovative technologies in aviation. The E-flight projects includes using an electric motor, ethanol-based fuels, and other power plant alternatives. In December 2010, an all-electric Waiex was test flown from Wittman Field in Oshkosh, Wisconsin. The aircraft was flown with a 54 kW (72 hp) brushless DC electric motor, managed by a newly designed controller. Power is from a collection of 14.5 kW-hour lithium polymer batteries, giving the aircraft an endurance of one hour at low-speed cruise or 15 minutes of aerobatics. This was the beginning of the development of the Sonex Electric Sport Aircraft.
