= Sonex Aircraft Sonex =

Type of aircraft

Sonex
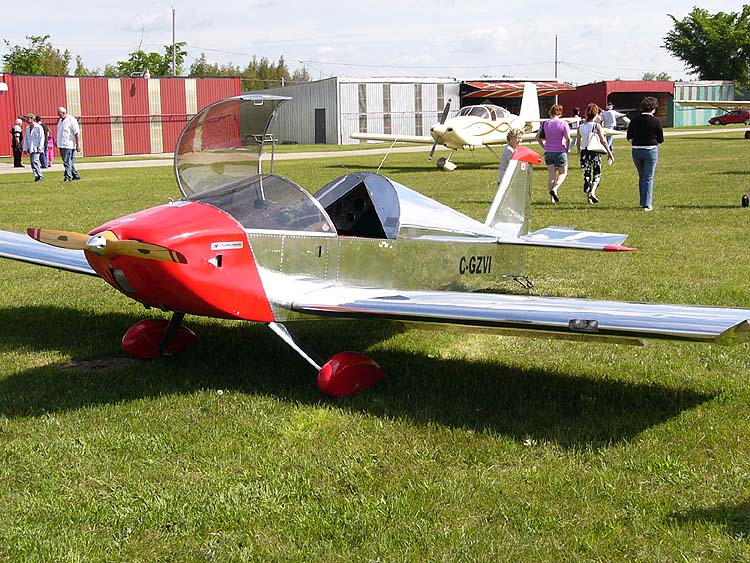

General information
- Type: Kit Aircraft
- Manufacturer: Sonex Aircraft
- Designer: John Monnett
- Primary user: Private Owners
- Number built: 311 (Sonex, Dec 2011); 1 (Onex, Dec 2011); 33 (Waiex, Dec 2011); 7 (Xenos, Dec 2011)

History
- First flight: 28 February 1998
- Variants: Sonex Aircraft Onex; Sonex Aircraft Xenos

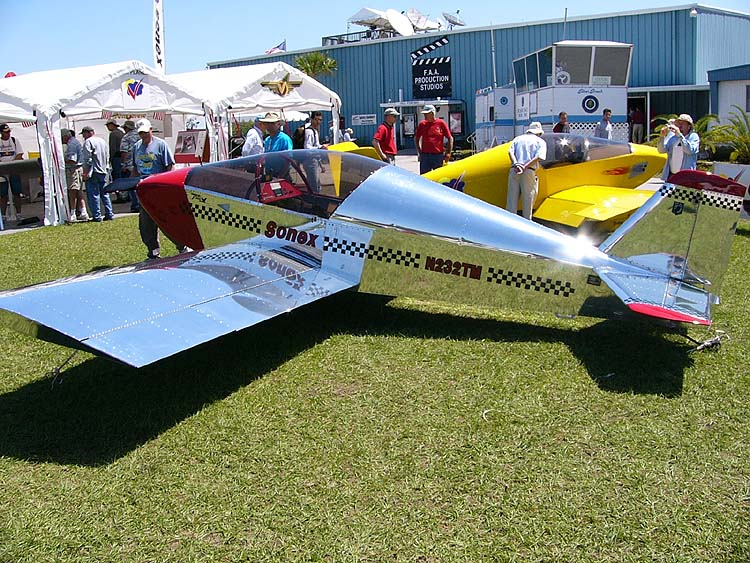
A Sonex at the company display at Sun 'n Fun 2004.

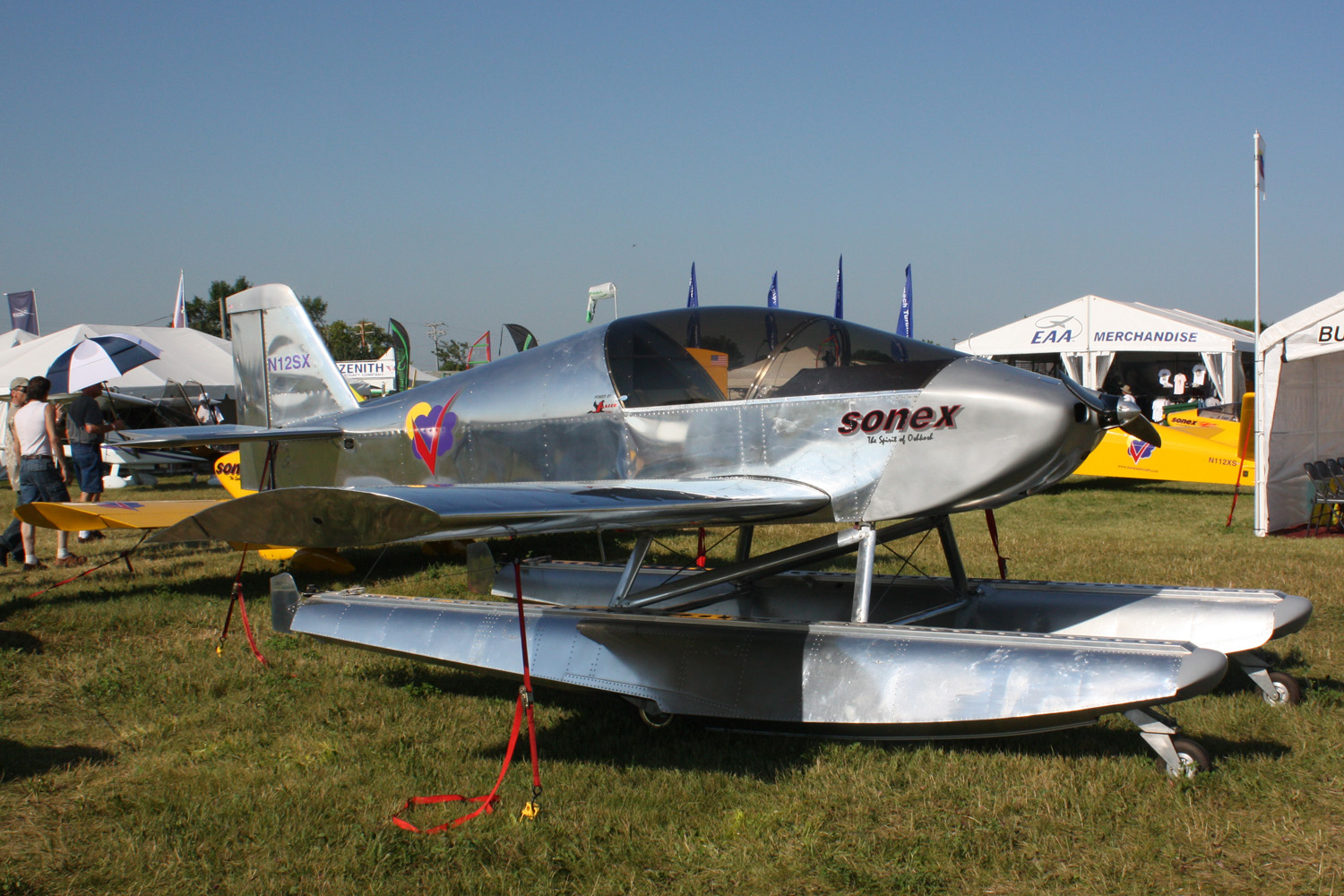
Sonex on floats at Airventure 2008.

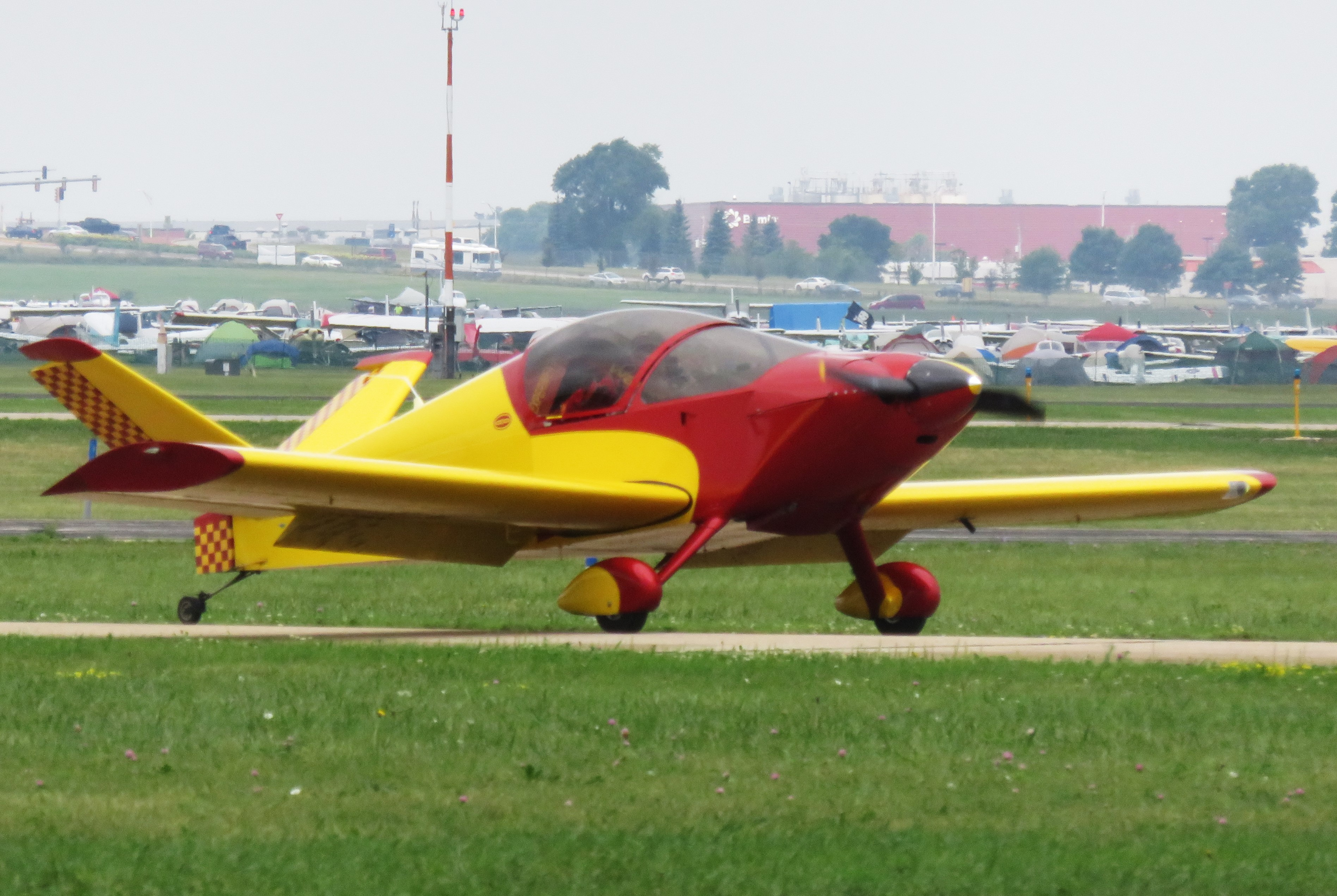
Sonex Aircraft Waiex

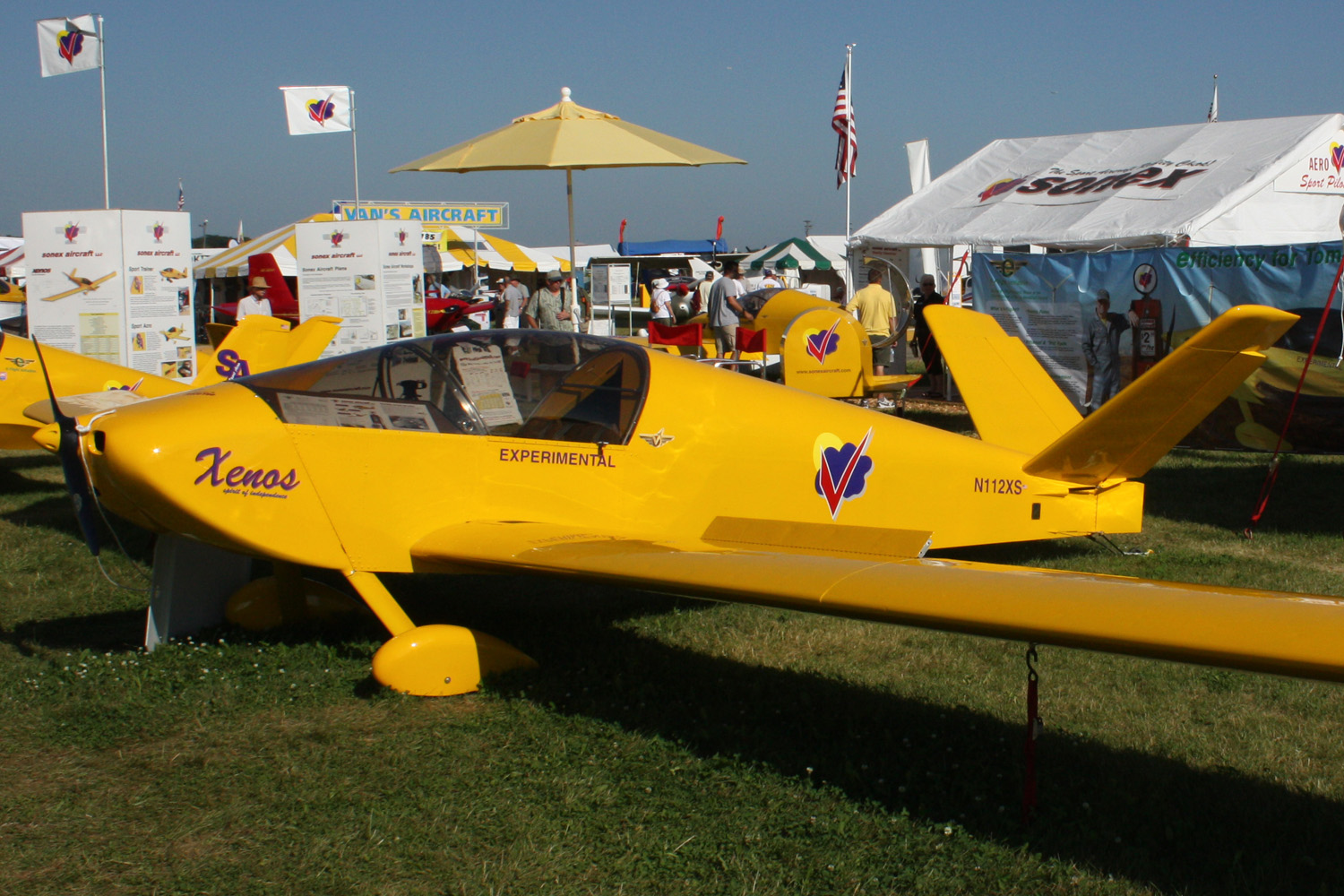
Sonex Xenos at Airventure 2008.

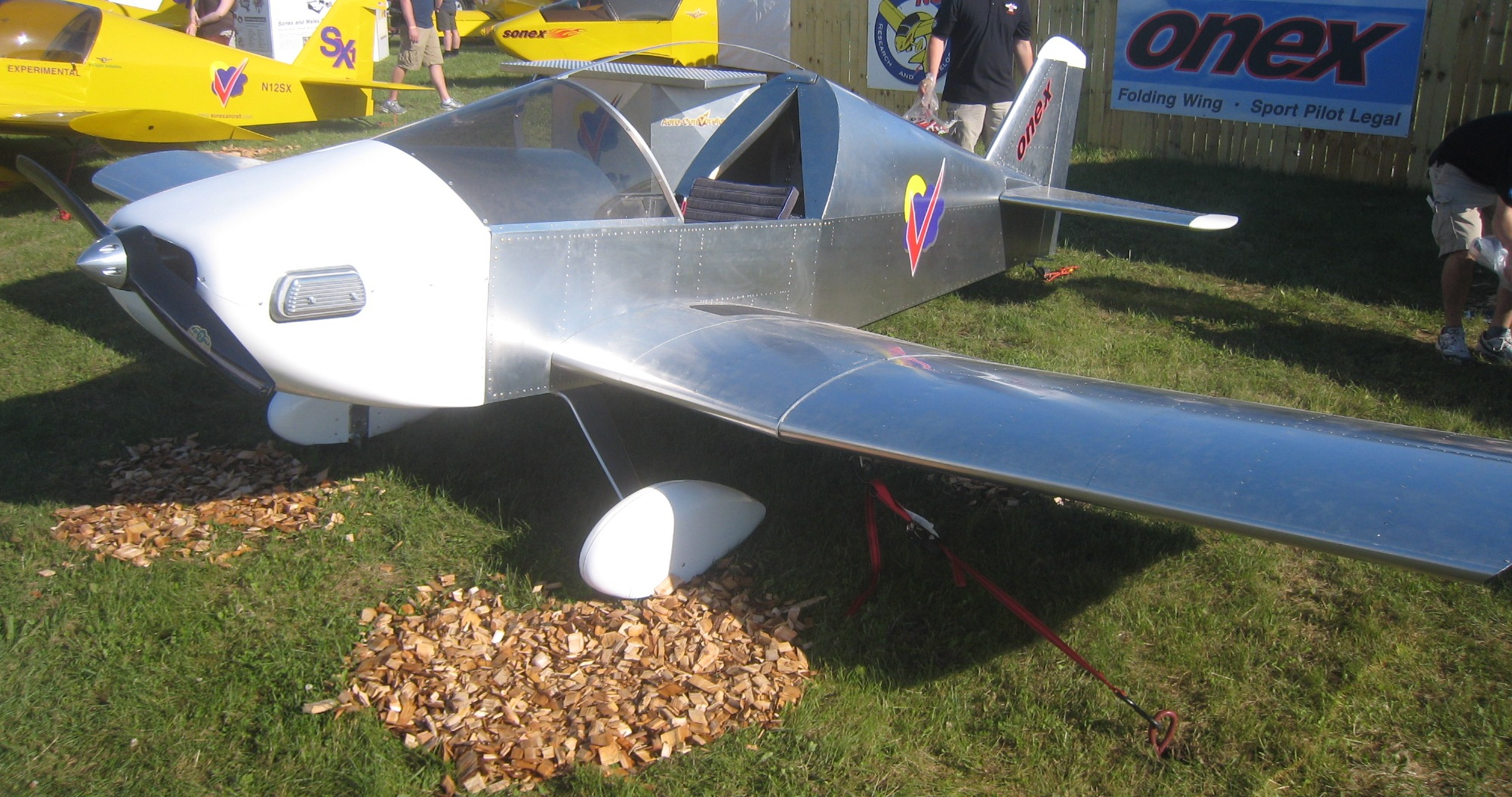
Onex

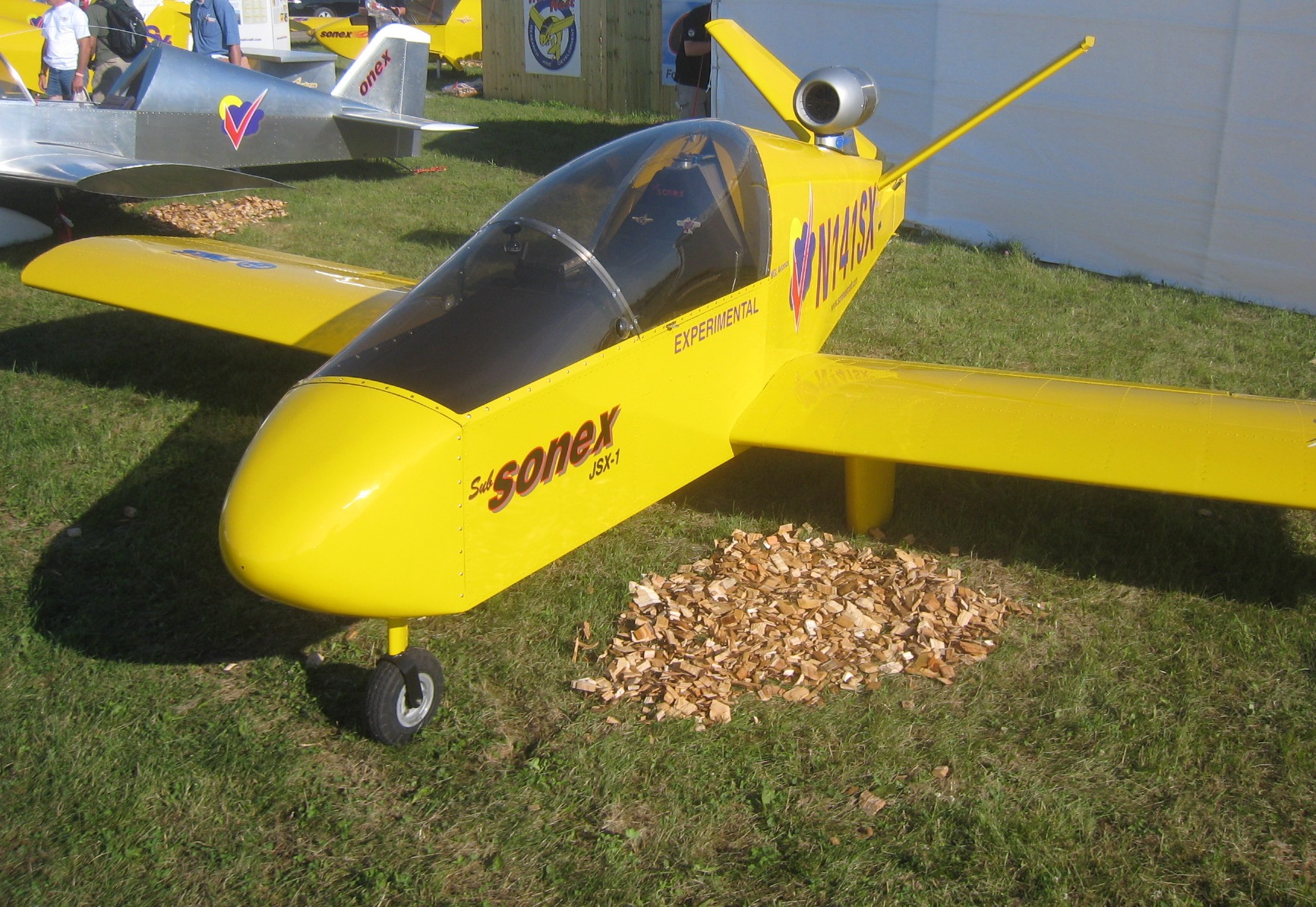
SubSonex prototype

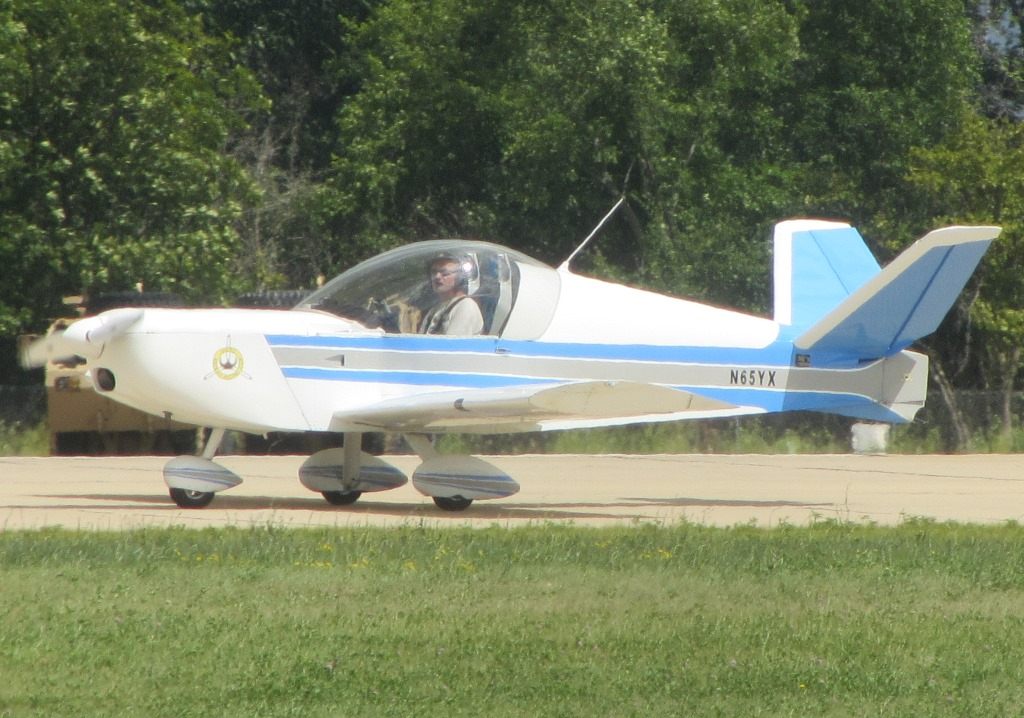
Sonex Waiex with a Viking 110 engine

The Onex, Sonex, Waiex and Xenos are a family of lightweight, metal, low-wing, two seat homebuilt aircraft. Kits are produced and marketed by Sonex Aircraft, a small manufacturer based in Oshkosh, Wisconsin. By 2014, 500 customer built aircraft had been completed. The Sonex can also be built from plans.

Company founder John Monnett was approached by an Italian business looking for an aircraft that would meet their Microlight category. A variation of Sonerai was initially proposed to meet the 40 mph minimum flight speed requirement. Eventually a clean-sheet design was built around a Jabiru or VW engine installation with similar all-aluminum box fuselage construction as the Monnett Moni. The Sonex can accept various lightweight – less than 200 lb (91 kg) – engines of between 80 and 130 hp (60 and 97 kW).

The Sonex, Waiex and Xenos all qualify as American experimental light-sport aircraft (ELSA).

== Development ==
The Sonex plans contain several construction options, including conventional or tricycle landing gear, as well as a center or dual stick. Motor mount drawings are supplied for all three recommended powerplants: the 2180cc Volkswagen, 2200 Jabiru, and 3300 Jabiru. High performance is achieved through a clean aerodynamic shape and simple, light weight construction.

The Sonex can be built from scratch using factory supplied drawings or may be assembled in approximately 800 to 1,000 hours using the precut complete airframe kit. A complete kit based Sonex can be constructed for as little as USD$25,600.

The Sonex first flew on 28 February 1998.

The aviation website Aero-News.Net named the Sonex the Plane of the Year - E-LSA Kit Category for 2006.

== Variants ==
Sonex
The original model, incorporating a low-wing design, two seats, and a conventional tail. Available as plans or a kit.
Sonex B
Introduced in April 2016, this model is a modification of the original Sonex, with an enlarged cockpit for larger and taller pilots, a center "Y-stick", electric flaps and dual throttles as standard. Support for the CAMit 3300 was offered and more room for the Rotax 912 and ULPower UL350i series of engines.
Waiex
In production - Almost identical to the Sonex, but features a Y-tail. Although similar in looks to a V-tail, the Y-tail has a stub rudder in line with the aft fuselage. The company markets this version under the motto Just Because It Looks Cool. Available as a kit only. First flew on 19 July 2003.
Waiex B
Introduced April 2016 - Same improvements as Sonex B
e-Flight Waiex
Waiex electric aircraft variant, powered by a DC brushless electric motor, built in 2007 and first displayed at AirVenture in 2009. Available as a kit only. First flew in 2010.
Xenos
In production - motor-glider development of the Waiex with longer wings and the same choice of engines. Available as a kit only.
Onex
(pronounced One-ex by the company) In production - All new design introduced at Airventure 2009. The design features a single seat with folding wings and an AeroVee Volkswagen air-cooled engine.
Teros
(2015) A proposed UAV, developed with Navmar Applied Sciences Corporation using the Waiex airframe powered by a turbocharged Aero-Vee engine.
SubSonex
A single place single engine turbine aircraft similar in design to an Onex, with a Waiex style Y tail. Introduced at Airventure 2009. Powered by a Czech-built PBS TJ-100 turbojet engine mounted above the aft fuselage, with the exhaust exiting between the Y-tail. The SubSonex achieved first engine test runs in December 2009. The engine produces 240 lb (109 kg) of thrust. Originally developed with only a central mono pod wheel, tail wheel and small wing tip outriggers. The prototype developed directional controllability problems during taxi-tests. The SubSonex now has a tricycle landing gear. and was flight tested by Jet-sailplane performer Bob Carlton in August 2011.

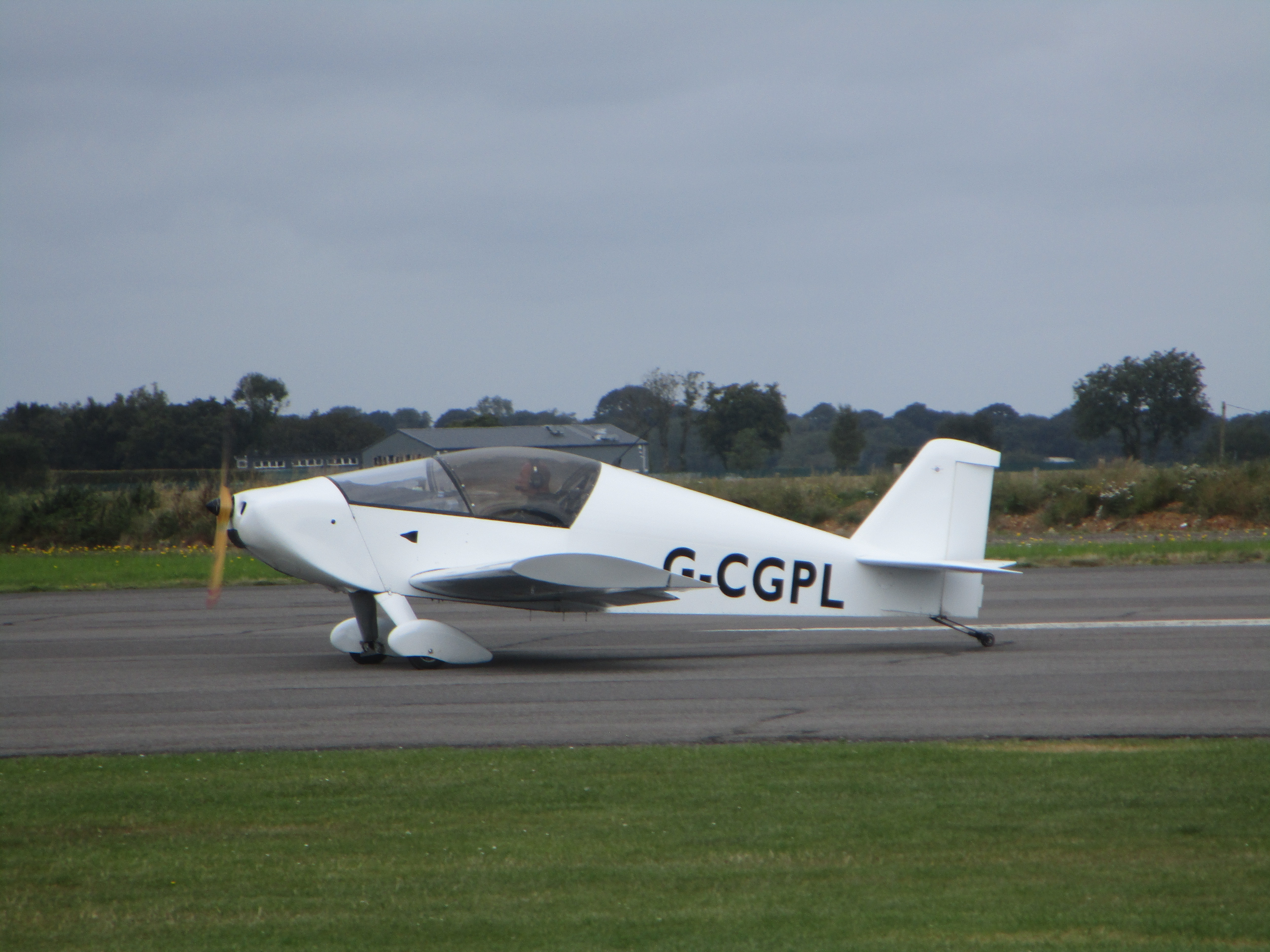
G-CGPL - SONEX Taxiing at Dunkeswell Aerodrome

== Specifications (Sonex) ==
Data from manufacturer’s website

General characteristics

- Crew: one
- Capacity: one passenger
- Length: 18 ft 1 in (5.51 m)
- Wingspan: 22 ft 0 in (6.71 m)
- Height: 4 ft 8 in (1.42 m) with conventional landing gear, 74" with tri-gear
- Wing area: 98 sq ft (9.1 m^{2})
- Airfoil: NACA 64-415
- Empty weight: 620 lb (281 kg)
- Gross weight: 1,220 lb (553 kg)
- Fuel capacity: 16 US gallons (60.6 litres)
- Powerplant: 1 × Jabiru 3300 six cylinder horizontally-opposed aircraft engine, 120 hp (89 kW)

Performance

- Cruise speed: 170 mph (270 km/h, 150 kn) at 8000 ft
- Stall speed: 40 mph (64 km/h, 35 kn) flaps down
- Never exceed speed: 197 mph (317 km/h, 171 kn)
- Range: 400 mi (640 km, 350 nmi)
- Service ceiling: 23,000 ft (7,000 m)
- g limits: +6/-3 at aerobatic gross weight or +4.4/-2.2 at utility gross weight
- Maximum glide ratio: 11:1
- Rate of climb: 1,400 ft/min (7.1 m/s)
- Lift-to-drag: 11:1
