= Sonex Aircraft SubSonex =

American jet-powered homebuilt airplane

SubSonex
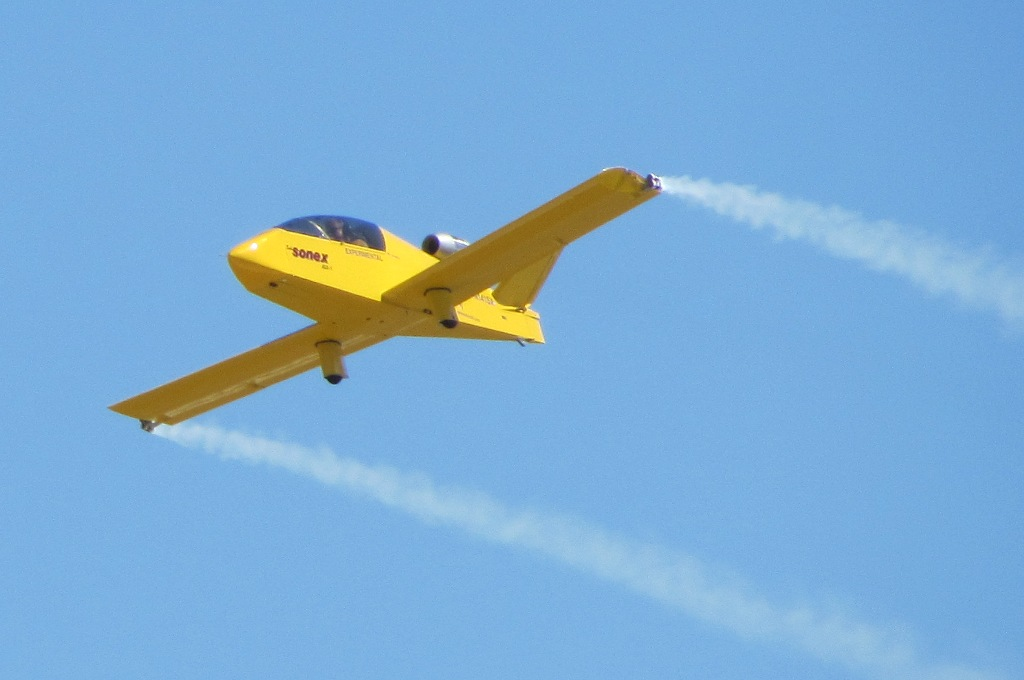
- SubSonex JSX-1

General information
- Type: Homebuilt aircraft
- National origin: United States
- Manufacturer: Sonex Aircraft
- Designer: John Monnett
- Status: In production (2022)
- Number built: 17 (January 2022)

History
- Manufactured: Fall 2014-present
- Introduction date: 2015
- First flight: 10 August 2011

The SubSonex is an experimental, single-seat, amateur-built jet aircraft from Sonex Aircraft's "Hornet's Nest" development division.

== Design and development ==
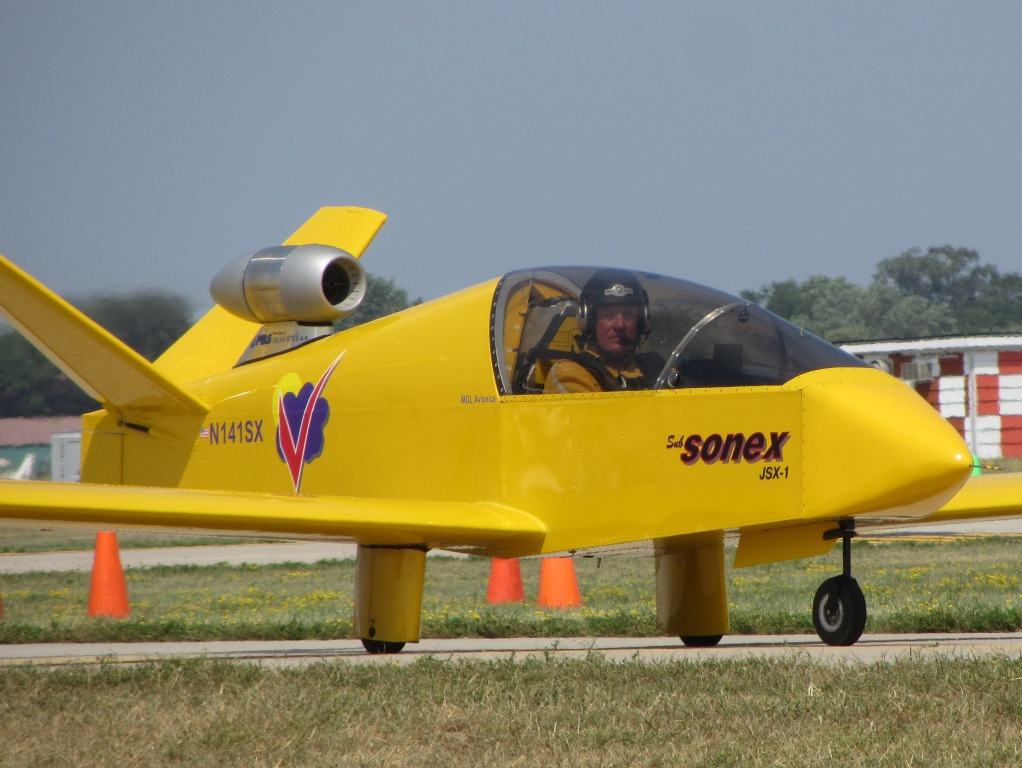
SubSonex JSX-1 demonstration flight

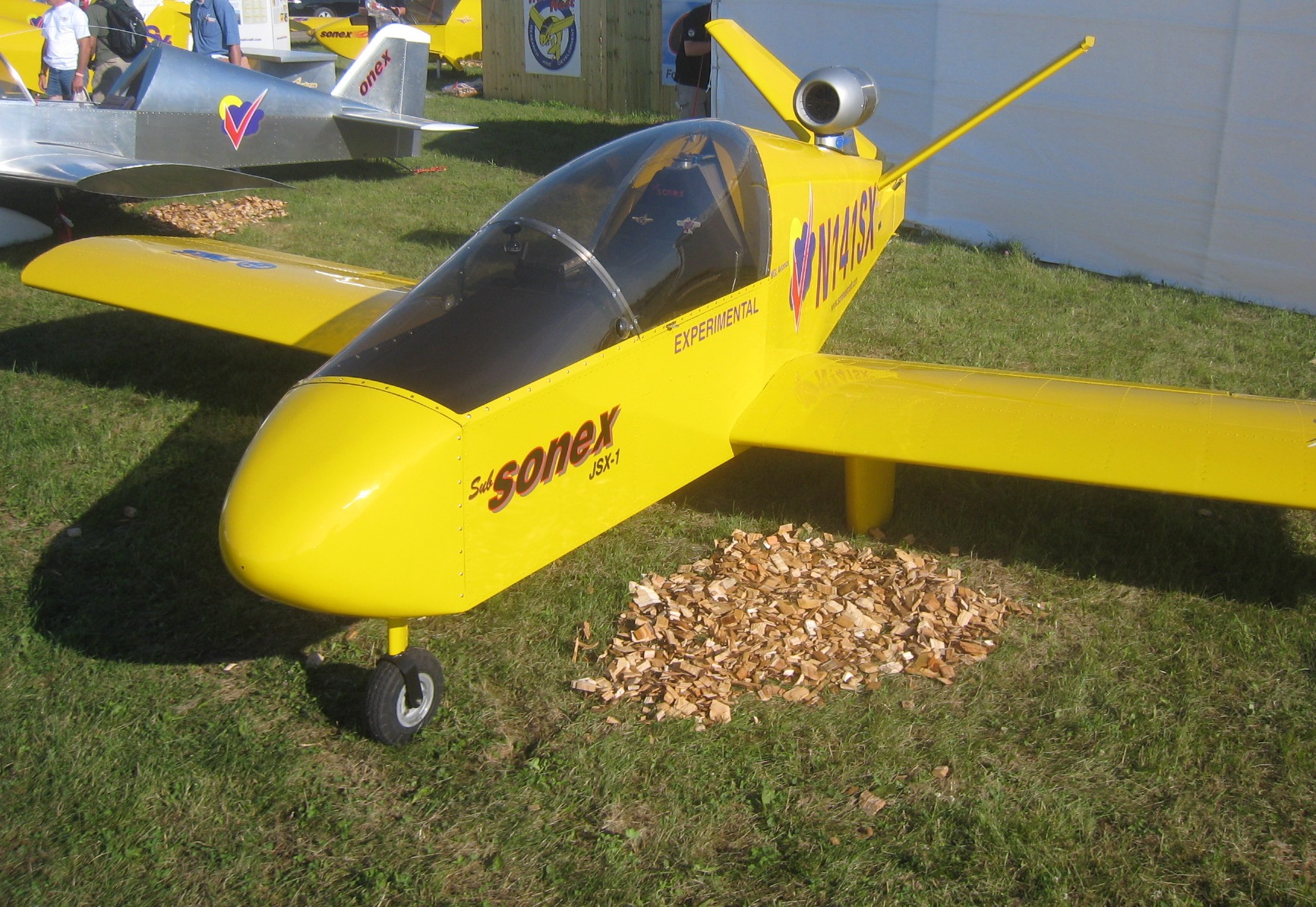
JSX-1 prototype

The JSX-1 is a single place, single engine jet aircraft similar in design to an Onex, with a Waiex style Y tail, fixed main landing gear and a retractable nosewheel. Introduced at AirVenture 2009, it is powered by a Czech-built PBS TJ100 turbojet engine mounted above the aft fuselage, with the exhaust exiting between the Y-tail. It achieved first engine test runs in December 2009. The engine produces 1100 N (240 lb) of thrust. Originally developed with only a central mono pod wheel, tail wheel and small wing tip outriggers, the prototype exhibited directional controllability problems during taxi tests. It was flight tested by jet-sailplane performer Bob Carlton in August 2011.

The production model of the SubSonex is the JSX-2. The landing gear was changed to a fully retractable, pneumatically-operated tricycle configuration.

At AirVenture 2013 the company began taking US$10,000 deposits on production kits. The kit's projected price was US$125,000 in 2013 and US$135,000 in 2014.

The first JSX-2 kit was shipped to a customer in February 2015, and completed and flown in October 2015.

== Operational history ==
By January 2022, 17 examples had been registered in the United States with the Federal Aviation Administration.

In August 2024, two JSX-2s were used by the Michigan Air National Guard as "cruise missile threat replication aircraft" and drones during Exercise Northern Strike. The JSX-2s are supplied by KestrelX.

== Variants ==
JSX-1
Prototype version.

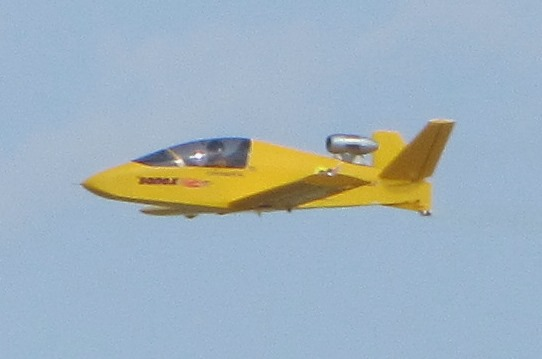
SubSonex JSX-2

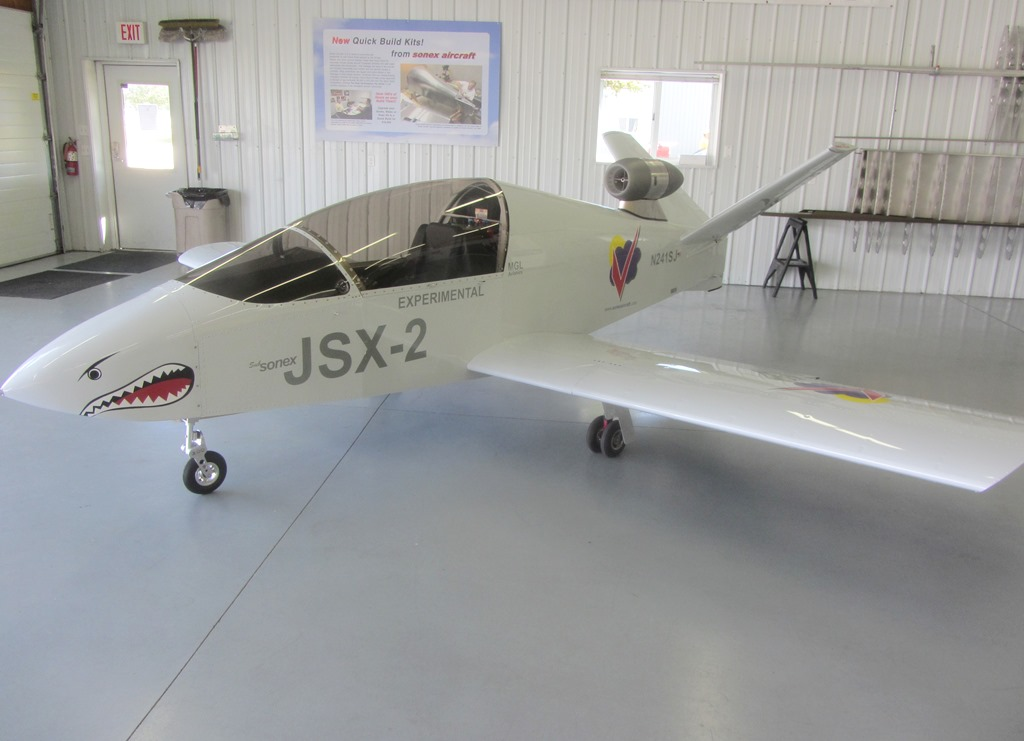
SubSonex JSX-2

JSX-2
Second version with a BRS parachute, wider fuselage, more streamlined nose, and fully retractable undercarriage. Bob Carlton performed the first test flight with the prototype JSX-2 on 10 July 2014 from Wittman Field. Entered production as an amateur-built kit in the fall of 2014.
JSX-2T
Two-seats in side-by-side configuration version announced in July 2019. It will use the same PBS TJ-100 turbojet engine with the PBS TJ-150 as an option. The design is projected to offer a cruise speed of over 174 kn (322 km/h) and an estimated useful load of 970 lb (440 kg). The aircraft was expected to be first publicly displayed at EAA AirVenture Oshkosh in July 2020, but the event was cancelled due to the COVID-19 pandemic.
NASC Tracer
Twin-jet unmanned aerial vehicle (UAV) model for military and civil applications, designed by Sonex and the Navmar Applied Sciences Corporation (NASC)

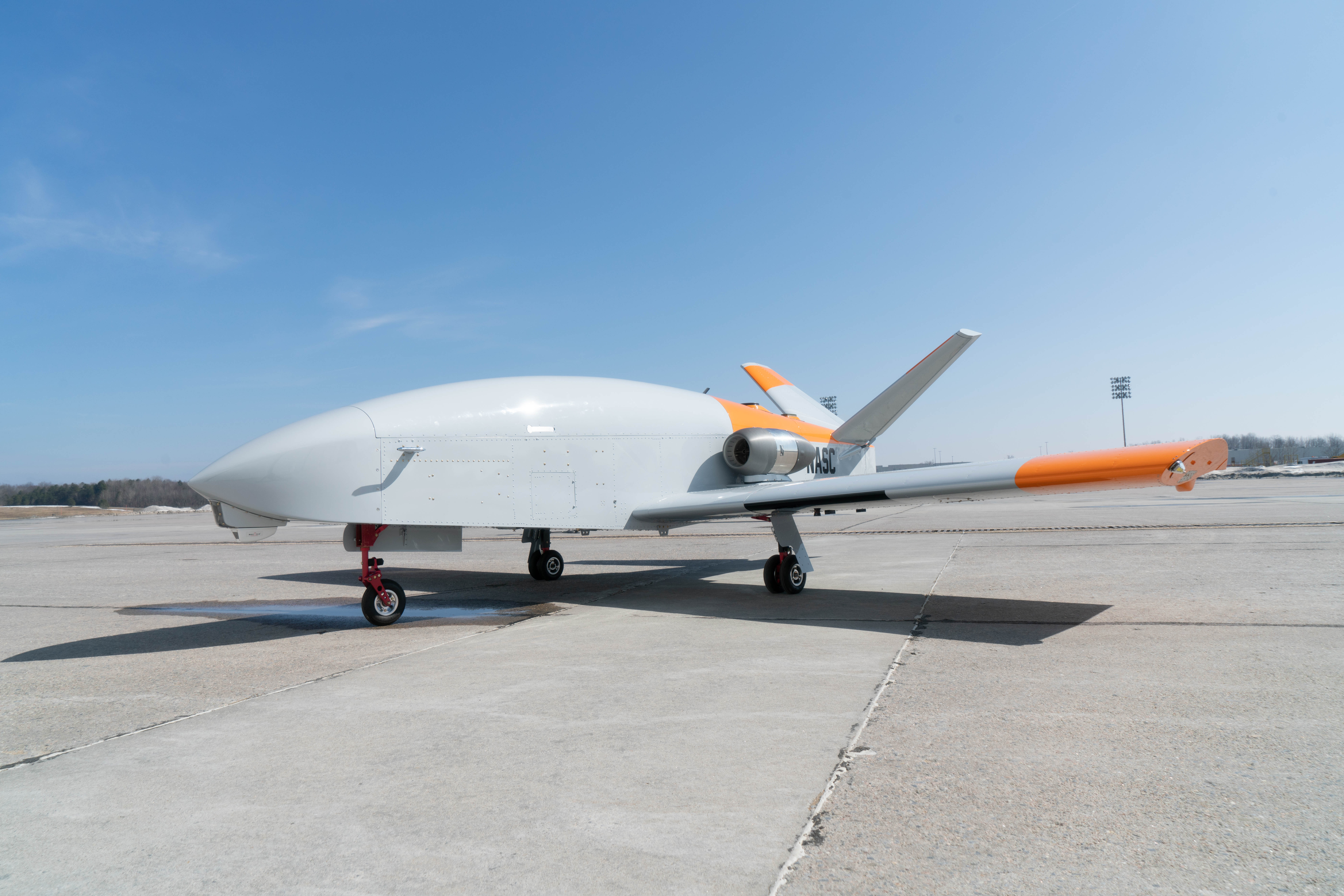
NASC Tracer

== Specifications (JSX-2) ==
Data from Sonex Aircraft and AINonline

General characteristics

- Crew: 1
- Length: 16 ft 6 in (5.03 m)
- Wingspan: 18 ft (5.5 m)
- Wing area: 60 sq ft (5.6 m^{2})
- Airfoil: 64-415
- Empty weight: 500 lb (227 kg) average
- Gross weight: 1,000 lb (454 kg) utility configuration
- Fuel capacity: 40 U.S. gallons (150 L; 33 imp gal)
- Powerplant: 1 × PBS TJ100 turbojet, 290 lbf (1.3 kN) thrust

Performance

- Cruise speed: 210 kn (240 mph, 390 km/h) TAS
- Stall speed: 50 kn (58 mph, 93 km/h) landing configuration
- Never exceed speed: 249 kn (287 mph, 462 km/h)
- Range: 420 nmi (480 mi, 770 km) with 30 minute reserve
- g limits: +4.4/-2.2 in utility configuration, +6/-3 in aerobatic configuration
- Rate of climb: 1,600 ft/min (8.1 m/s) initial at sea level
- Fuel consumption: 18 US gallons (68 L) per hour

Avionics

- MGL Avionics Flight II instrument and the MGL V10 Com transceiver

== See also ==
Aircraft of comparable role, configuration, and era

- Bede-5J jet
- Colomban Cri-cri Jet
- Wheeling PJ1

Related lists

- List of very light jets
