= 30 May 2023 Moscow drone strikes =

May 2023 event in Moscow, Russia

- Part of the Attacks in Russia of the Russo-Ukrainian war
- Location: Moscow, Russia
- Date: 30 May 2023
- Target: Moscow
- Attack type: Drone strike
- Weapon: 25 drones
- Perpetrators: Disputed: Ukraine (per Russia, denied by Ukraine)

On 30 May 2023, amidst the ongoing Russo-Ukrainian war, the Russian capital of Moscow was subject to several drone strikes. At least eight drones were involved in the attacks. Five of the drones were shot down by air missiles, the other three were suppressed by electronic warfare systems. Russia blamed Ukraine.

Moscow was also targeted and struck by drones numerous times in June, July, August, and September.

== Background ==
In February 2022, Russia launched an invasion of Ukraine.

Earlier in May 2023, two drones were shot down over the Kremlin in Moscow in what Russia claims was an attack perpetrated by Ukraine.

== Attacks ==
The same day as the strikes, the Ukrainian capital of Kyiv faced its third air raid within 24 hours.

Videos posted to social media showed a drone exploding in a field outside Moscow, and others flying over houses in Rublyovka, a wealthy district in southwestern Moscow.

Sergei Shoigu, Russian minister of defence, claimed Ukraine had used eight drones, though none had hit their targets. The ministry said that five drones had been shot down, and the other three had their systems jammed. According to a Telegram channel with links to the security services, around 25 drones were involved, with 15 shot down approaching Moscow or over the city according to Russia. Mayor of Moscow Sergey Sobyanin stated that two people suffered minor injuries after drones crashed into residential buildings. Three residential buildings had some windows shattered as a result of the attacks.

Attacking aircraft resembled the Ukrainian long-range Beaver drone.

== Reactions ==
Vladimir Putin, President of Russia, claimed that the strikes showed Ukraine was attempting "to intimidate Russia", saying that it was "clearly a sign of terrorist activity" and that Russia would strengthen air defences around Moscow. Putin vowed to retaliate against Ukraine for the attacks. The foreign ministry of Russia stated that support for Ukraine was "pushing the Ukrainian leadership towards ever more reckless criminal deeds including acts of terrorism". Leader of the Russian mercenary Wagner Group, Yevgeny Prigozhin, criticized the Russian defence ministry for its failure to prevent the attack.

In response to the attacks, Ukrainian presidential adviser Mykhailo Podolyak said in an online interview that "of course we are pleased to watch and predict an increase in the number of attacks. But of course we have nothing directly to do with this".

A spokesperson for the United States government said that information was still being gathered on the attacks, saying that "as a general matter, [the United States does] not support attacks inside of Russia]". A French official said that French military support to Ukraine should not be used to attack Russia.

Russia's ambassador to the United States, Anatoly Antonov, called the American refusal to condemn Ukraine for the attack "an encouragement for Ukrainian terrorists".

== See also ==
- July–August 2023 Moscow drone attack
- November 2024 Moscow drone attack
- Kremlin drone attack
- Crocus City Hall attack
