= Sonex Xenos =

American homebuilt aircraft

Xenos
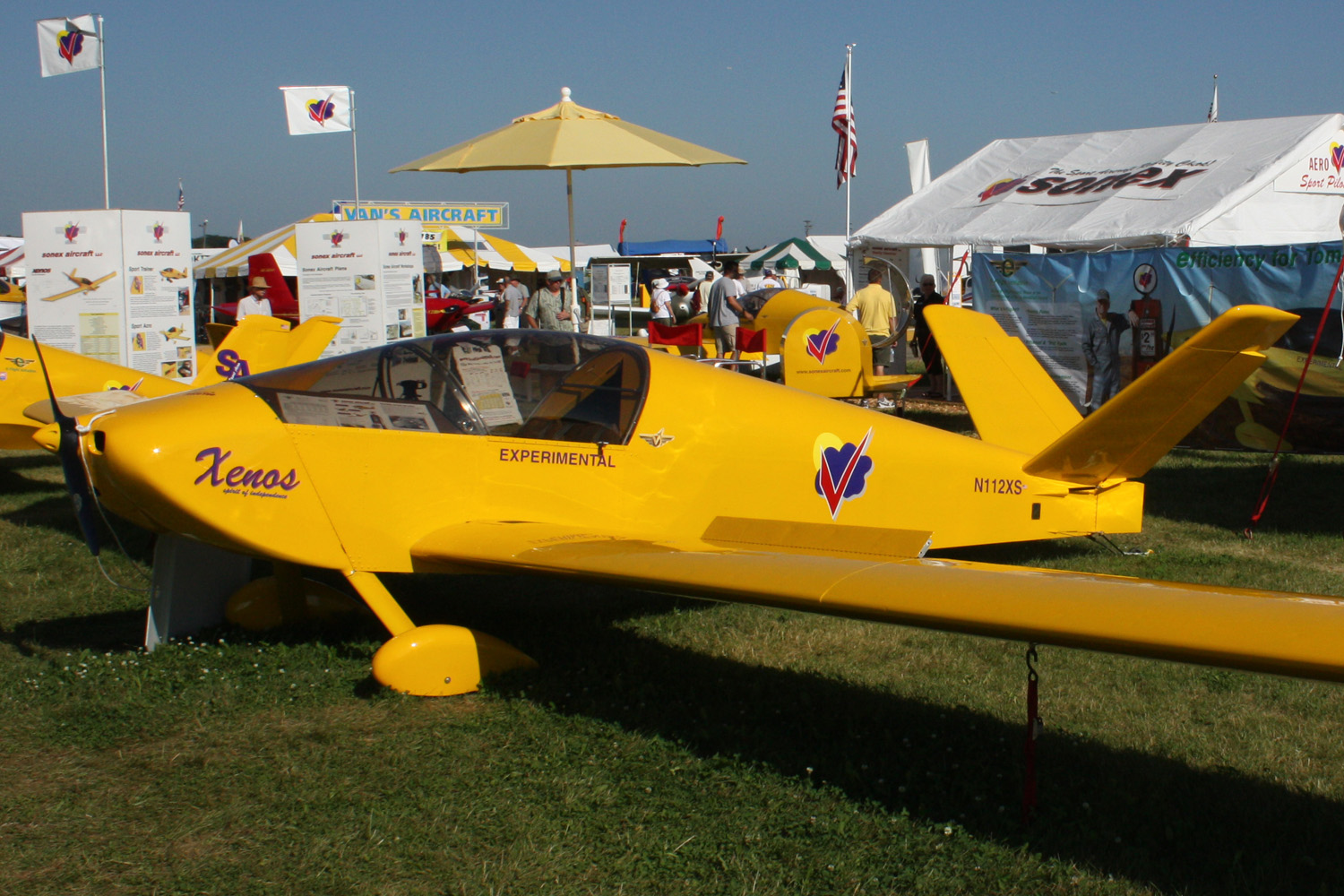

General information
- Type: Kit aircraft
- Manufacturer: Sonex Aircraft

History
- First flight: 19 July 2003

The Xenos is a light, aluminum, low-wing, two seat homebuilt aircraft, that can be registered as a motor glider or a light-sport aircraft (ELSA). Kits are produced and marketed by Sonex Aircraft, a small manufacturer based in Oshkosh, Wisconsin.

== Design and development ==
The Xenos motor glider is an evolution of the Monnett Moni motor glider.

After the introduction of the original Xenos model, the Xenos-B model was introduced in January 2017. Shipments of the "B" model began in March 2017. In response to customer demand, the "B" model included modifications that had already been incorporated into the Sonex and Waiex "B" models. The modifications included enlarging the fuselage to provide more shoulder, hip, knee and foot room. Also, the seat was moved back and staggered seating can be added by the use of seat cushions. The control stick was changed to a "Y" stick, the instrument panel enlarged, fuel capacity increased by 4 U.S. gallons (15 L; 3.3 imp gal), plus a number of improvements to speed construction time.

== Specifications (Xenos-B) ==
Data from manufacturer's website

General characteristics

- Crew: one
- Capacity: one passenger
- Length: 19 ft 9 in (6.02 m)
- Wingspan: 45 ft 8 in (13.92 m)
- Height: 4 ft 11 in (1.50 m)
- Wing area: 158 sq ft (14.7 m^{2})
- Empty weight: 720 lb (327 kg)
- Gross weight: 1,275 lb (578 kg)
- Fuel capacity: 20 US gallons (75.7 litres)
- Powerplant: 1 × Jabiru 3300(optional) , 120 hp (89 kW)

Performance

- Cruise speed: 140 mph (230 km/h, 120 kn) at 8000 ft
- Stall speed: 44 mph (71 km/h, 38 kn) clean
- Never exceed speed: 150 mph (240 km/h, 130 kn)
- Range: 500 mi (800 km, 430 nmi)
- Service ceiling: 23,000 ft (7,000 m)
- g limits: +6/-3 at aerobatic gross weight or +4.4/-2.2 at utility gross weight
- Maximum glide ratio: 24:1
- Rate of climb: 2,000 ft/min (10 m/s)
- Lift-to-drag: 24:1
