= Navmar Applied Sciences Corporation =

American engineering company

Navmar Applied Sciences Corporation is an American engineering company.

== Operations ==
Navmar provides engineering and technical solutions in the area of acoustics, electronics, aerodynamics, systems engineering, prototyping, sensors, electro-optics, materials, system integration, and corrosion protection to defence departments globally. It offers acoustic and non-acoustic sensors, and sonobuoys for undersea surveillance and exploration; unmanned aircraft systems; personnel for unmanned aircraft mission support; and analysis and engineering services for aircraft subsystems and related equipment.

The company was founded in 1977 by CEO and President Thomas Fenerty and is based in Warminster, Pennsylvania, with locations and operations in the United States.

== Unmanned aerial vehicles ==
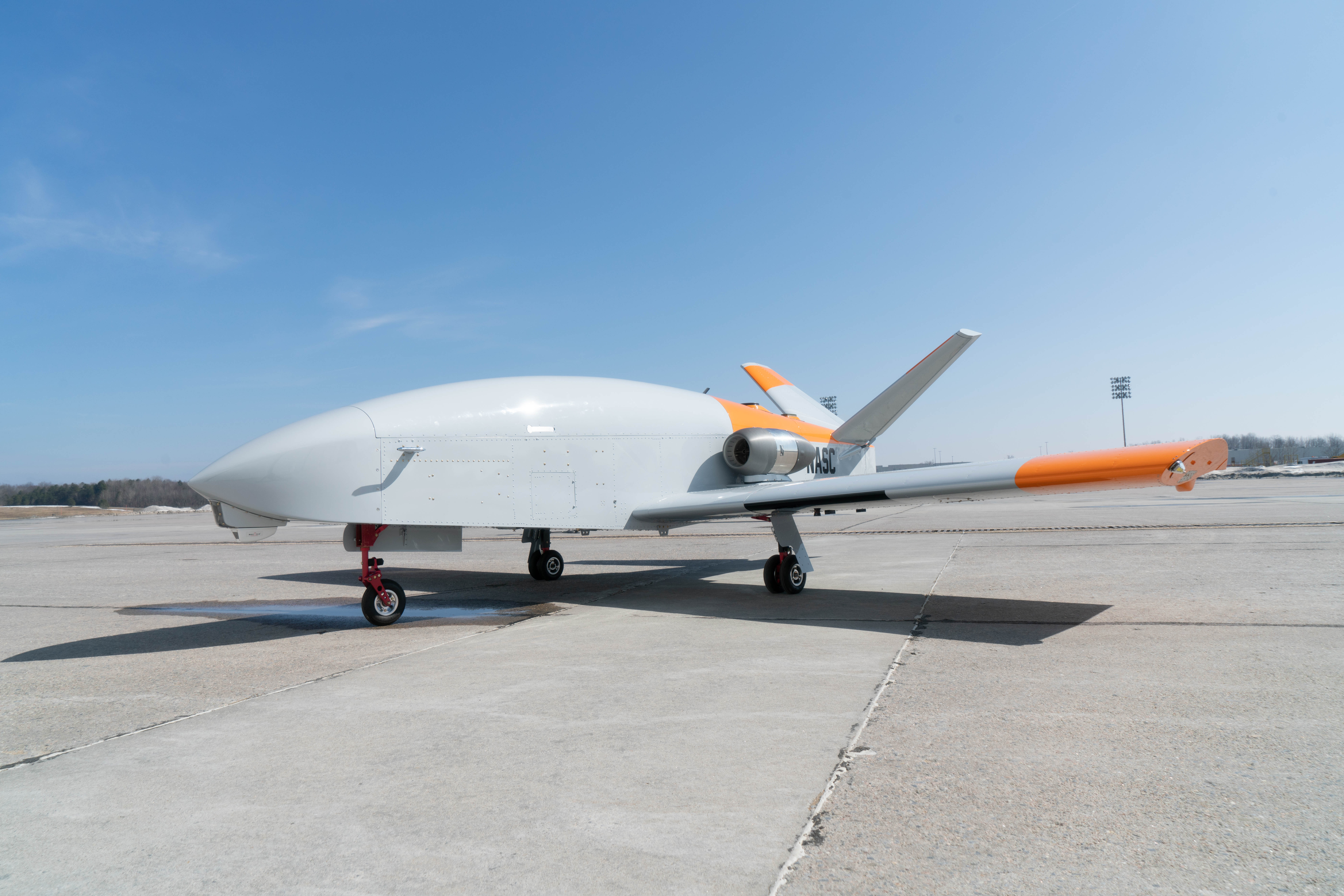
NASC Tracer

- ArcticShark
- NASC Tracer
- RQ-23 TigerShark
- Sonex Aircraft Teros
- TigerShark XP

== Government contracts ==
Navmar Applied Sciences Corporation has worked on 194 contracts worth $1.23 billion in obligations from the U.S. Federal Government from FY2007 to 2017.

- A high of $253 million in obligations in FY2011
- A low of $32.1 million in obligations in FY2009

Principle agencies

- Department of Defense
- Department of Transportation
- General Services Administration
