= 2004 Moscow Metro bombings =

The 2004 Moscow Metro bombings refer to two related terrorist attacks:

- February 2004 Moscow Metro bombing
- August 2004 Moscow Metro bombing
