= November 2024 Moscow drone attack =

- Part of the attacks in Russia during the Russian invasion of Ukraine
- Location: Moscow, Russia
- Date: 10 November 2024; 7 – 10 a.m (MSK)
- Target: Moscow
- Attack type: Drone attack
- Weapon: Drone
- Injuries: One hospitalized
- Perpetrator: Ukraine
- Motive: Retaliation for a previous Russian drone attack

On 10 November 2024, at least 34 Ukrainian drones attacked Moscow. It is the largest drone strike on the city since the 2022 Russian invasion of Ukraine. Three Moscow airports were temporarily closed and landings were diverted.

== Background ==
In the night of 7 November 2024, Russia launched overnight missile and drone strikes across Ukraine that killed 11 civilians and injured dozens more. Warning sirens in Kyiv lasted for almost 10 hours as buildings caught fire due to the exploding drones.

On 9 November 2024, the Ukrainian Defense Ministry announced that Russia had launched 145 drones across the country overnight. Three people were killed and eighteen others injured.

== Attack ==
On 10 November 2024 at approximately 7 a.m MSK, Ukraine began its attack by launching an estimated 70 drones into Russian territory. The Russian Defense Ministry claimed 34 drones were shot down over Moscow's outskirts, making the attack the largest strike in the capital since the beginning of the Russian invasion of Ukraine.

== Reactions ==
Russia: The Russian Defense Ministry announced that they had "thwarted a terrorist attack by the Kiev regime" with "airplane-type drones" on a Telegram post.

== See also ==
- 30 May 2023 Moscow drone strikes
- July–August 2023 Moscow drone attack
- Kremlin drone attack
- Crocus City Hall attack
