= July–August 2023 Moscow drone attack =

2023 drone attacks in Moscow

Moscow City drone attacks
- Part of 2022 Russian invasion of Ukraine
- Date: July 30 – August 23, 2023
- Location: (Russia) , Moscow, MIBC "Moscow City"; 55.749588°N 37.535299°E
- Outcome: Damage to the facades of three towers
- Deaths: 0
- Injuries: 1
- Suspects: Ukraine (accused by Russia)

Diagram of the towers struck by drones (marked with red pins)

The Moscow City drone attacks were a series of Ukrainian drone strikes targeting the Moscow International Business Centre, between 30 July and 23 August 2023. The attacks occurred amid the ongoing Russian invasion of Ukraine. Russian authorities attributed responsibility to Ukraine, describing each incident as an attempted terrorist attack.

== Course of the events ==
=== 30 July ===
In the early hours of 30 July, two drones entered the Moscow City district. Russian electronic warfare systems suppressed both, causing them to lose control and crash into office buildings in the complex. Windows were blown out across several floors and a security guard was injured by debris. A third drone was intercepted and destroyed over the Odintsovo district on the outskirts of Moscow.

=== 1 August ===
Two days later, another drone struck the same tower that had been hit, impacting at the level of the 21st floor. The attack prompted a temporary suspension of operations at Vnukovo International Airport.

=== 23 August ===
Three drones were involved in the final attack. One came down over the Mozhaisk district of Moscow Oblast, while a second crashed in Khimki, damaging several structures including residential buildings. The third struck the unfinished One Tower skyscraper within the Moscow City complex, causing damage between the 10th and 15th floors and blowing out windows in a neighbouring building. No casualties were reported.

== See also ==
- 30 May 2023 Moscow drone strikes
- November 2024 Moscow drone attack
- Kremlin drone attack
