= Kremlin drone attack =

2023 drone explosion in Moscow, Russia

- Part of the attacks in Russia during the Russo-Ukrainian war
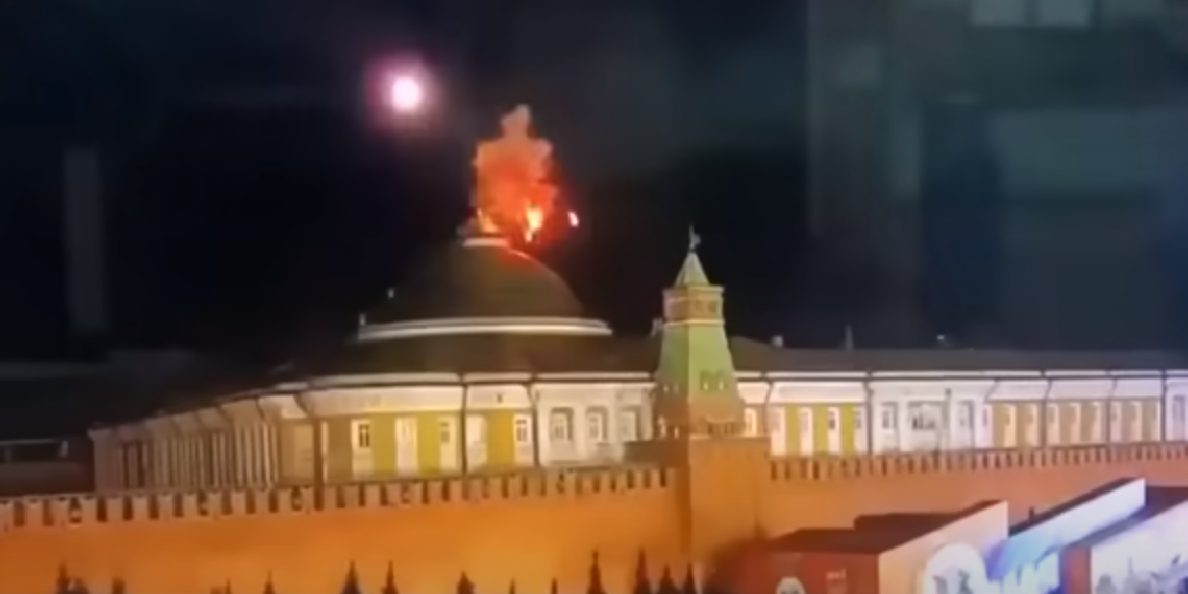
- Footage of the incident
- Location: Kremlin Senate, Moscow, Russia
- Date: 3 May 2023; 02:27 and 02:43 (MSK, UTC+03:00)
- Target: Kremlin
- Attack type: Drone attack
- Deaths: None
- Injuries: None
- Perpetrator: Disputed

On 3 May 2023, amidst the ongoing Russo-Ukrainian war, two explosive drones allegedly targeted the Kremlin in Moscow and were shot down. President Vladimir Putin was not present in the building at the time and no one was injured in the incident.

The Kremlin accused Ukraine of perpetrating the incident and called it an "act of terrorism" and an assassination attempt. Ukrainian officials denied involvement, while U.S. officials said it was likely that a Ukrainian intelligence or special military unit was behind the attack.

== Incident ==
An unverified video posted on social media showed an object flying towards the Kremlin before a small explosion occurred near a flagpole on top of the Kremlin Senate dome. In the footage, two unidentified people were seen climbing the dome. Another video showed smoke rising near the building.

Russian officials claimed that the two drones were disabled with electronic radar assets.

== Reactions ==
=== Russia ===
On 3 May, Moscow's mayor Sergey Sobyanin announced a no drone zone over the city.

Vyacheslav Volodin, the speaker of Russia's State Duma and ally of Putin, called the alleged drone attack a "terrorist attack" on Russia and compared the Ukrainian government to terrorist organizations such as al-Qaeda and the Islamic State, saying that "The Nazi Kyiv regime must be recognised as a terrorist organisation." Volodin demanded the use of "weapons capable of stopping and destroying the Kyiv terrorist regime". Loyalist and Duma deputy Mikhail Sheremet called for a retaliatory strike against Ukrainian president Zelenskyy.

Yevgeny Prigozhin, the head of the Wagner military group, cautioned against the use of nuclear weapons, saying that "We look like clowns threatening to use nuclear weapons in response to a child's drone."

Kremlin spokesman Dmitry Peskov claimed that the United States was behind an alleged drone attack on the Kremlin aiming to kill Putin, saying that "We know very well that decisions about such actions, about such terrorist attacks, are made not in Kyiv but in Washington." Leading Kremlin propagandist Vladimir Solovyov compared the incident to the September 11 attacks.

Former president and the current head of Russia's Security Council, Dmitry Medvedev, threatened that "After today's terrorist attack, there are no options left aside the physical elimination of Zelensky and his cabal." State Duma member Andrey Gurulyov said that "We should officially declare that all of the leadership of this terrorist nation is subject to being physically eliminated."

Moscow vowed to retaliate whenever and wherever it deems fit.

==== Russian dissidents ====
Former Russian politician Ilya Ponomarev claimed in a CNN interview that prior to the attack he had spoken with Russian resistance "anti-fascists" who carried it out. According to Ponomarev, the group originally planned the attack to occur on Victory Day, but in April there were discussions where he advised that the attack instead occur prior to the festivities, due the danger to parade crowds, and that because to the sacredness of the day, it might achieve the opposite result due to a rally 'round the flag effect . On his account, the goal of the 3 May drone attack was to force cancellation of the parade so that Russians would understand that the war was lost.

=== Ukraine ===
Ukrainian presidential adviser Mykhailo Podolyak commented that Kyiv had nothing to do with the alleged attack on the Kremlin, that such actions achieved nothing for Kyiv on the battlefield, and would only provoke Russia to take more radical action. Podolyak said that the allegations that Kyiv was behind the incident, and Russia's arrest of alleged Ukrainian saboteurs in Crimea, could indicate that Moscow was preparing for a large-scale "terrorist" attack against Ukraine in the coming days. Ukrainian President Volodymyr Zelenskyy, while on a visit to Finland stated that, "We don't attack Putin or Moscow. We fight on our territory. We are defending our villages and cities." On 3 May 2023, Russian strikes on Ukraine's Kherson Oblast killed 21 people.

=== Other countries ===
U.S. Secretary of State Antony Blinken stated at a global press conference, "I would take anything coming out of the Kremlin with a very large shaker of salt." US officials were skeptical that any drone sent to Ukraine could have been used in the attack, as it would have to travel a long distance to reach Moscow. White House press secretary Karine Jean-Pierre said the US was "not encouraging or enabling Ukraine to strike beyond its border."

Phillips O'Brien, professor of strategic studies at the University of St Andrews, said, "It certainly wasn't an attempt to assassinate Putin, because he doesn't sleep in the roof and he probably never sleeps in the Kremlin." James Nixey, director of the Russia and Eurasia Program at the Chatham House think-tank, said "the two most likely possibilities are a 'warning shot across the bows' by Kyiv or a false flag operation by Moscow designed to justify more intense attacks in Ukraine or more conscription."

U.S. officials said it was likely that a Ukrainian intelligence or special military unit was behind the attack, though they had "low confidence" that the Ukrainian government directly authorized the attack due to U.S. intelligence agencies having not yet identified specific units or officials involved in the attack.

== See also ==
- Drone warfare
- 2022–2023 Western Russia attacks
- 1999 Russian apartment bombings
- 2018 Caracas drone attack, a similar incident with a drone targeting Venezuelan President Nicolás Maduro
- Mathias Rust, who landed a light aircraft near the Kremlin
- 2024 drone attack on Benjamin Netanyahu's residence
- 30 May 2023 Moscow drone strikes
- July–August 2023 Moscow drone attack
- November 2024 Moscow drone attack
