= AeroConversions AeroVee 2180 =

Engine for homebuilt aircraft

Aero Vee Engine
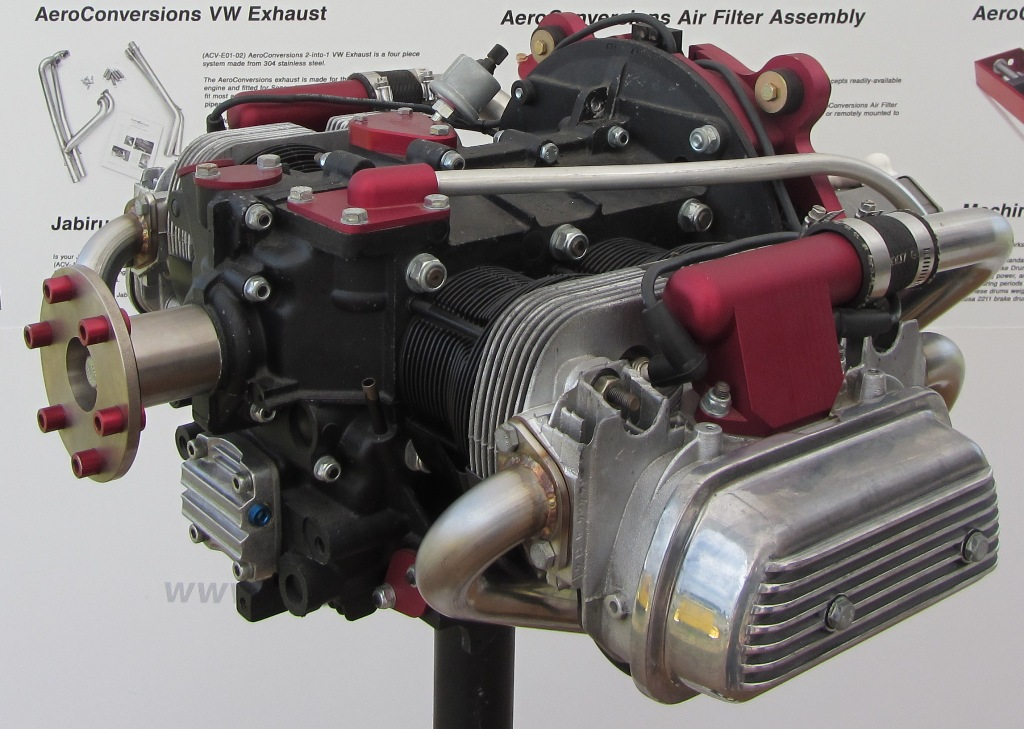
- Type: Horizontally Opposed Piston Engine
- National origin: Germany, America
- Manufacturer: AeroConversions division of Sonex Aircraft, LLC
- First run: 2002
- Major applications: Sonex, Waiex, Xenos
- Developed from: Volkswagen air-cooled engine

The AeroConversions Aerovee Engine is a kit-built engine for homebuilt aircraft based on the Volkswagen air-cooled engine.

== Design and development ==
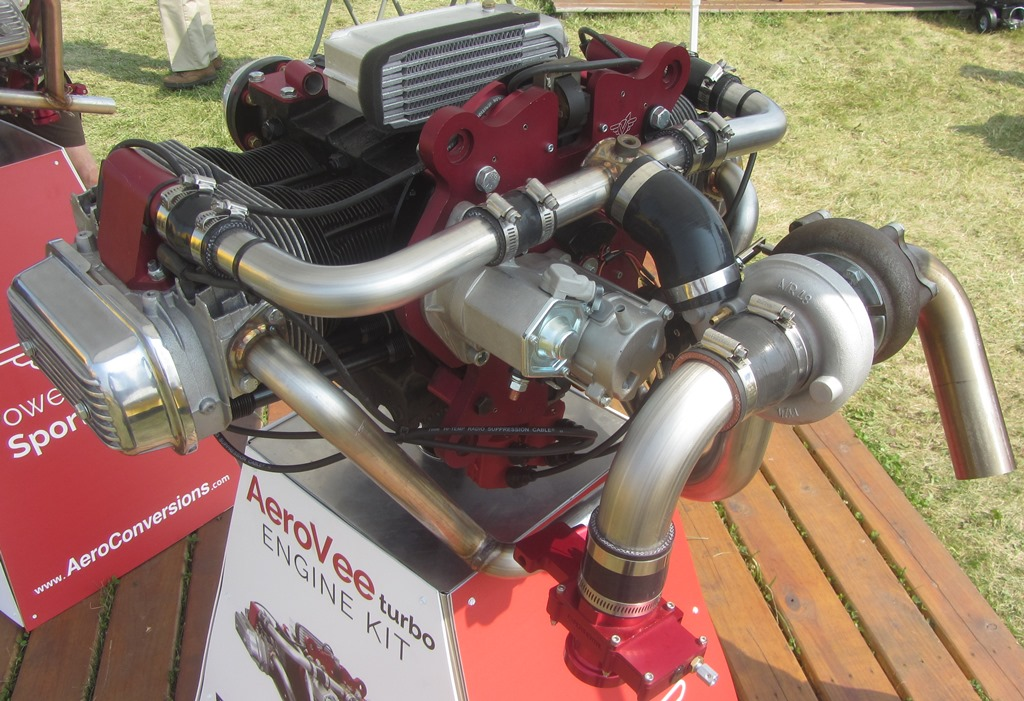
AeroVee Turbo

The AeroVee engine is manufactured and marketed by AeroConversions, a part of Sonex Aircraft. In 2014, a turbocharger was developed as a $4,200 modification to existing AeroVee engines. The new turbocharged engine is rated at 100 hp.

== Specifications (AeroVee 2.1) ==
Data from World Directory of Leisure Aviation 2011-12

=== General characteristics ===
- Type: Four-cylinder, air-cooled, horizontally-opposed, aircraft piston engine
- Bore: 92 mm (3.6 in)
- Stroke: 82 mm (3.2 in)
- Displacement: 2,180 cc (133.0 cu in)
- Length: 762 mm (30.0 in)
- Width: 343 mm (13.5 in)
- Height: 616 mm (24.3 in)
- Dry weight: 76 kg (167.6 lb)

=== Components ===
- Cooling system: Air-cooled

=== Performance ===
- Power output: 80 hp (60 kW) at 3400rpm
- Compression ratio: 8.0:1
