= Bonsall DB-1 Mustang =

DB-1 Mustang
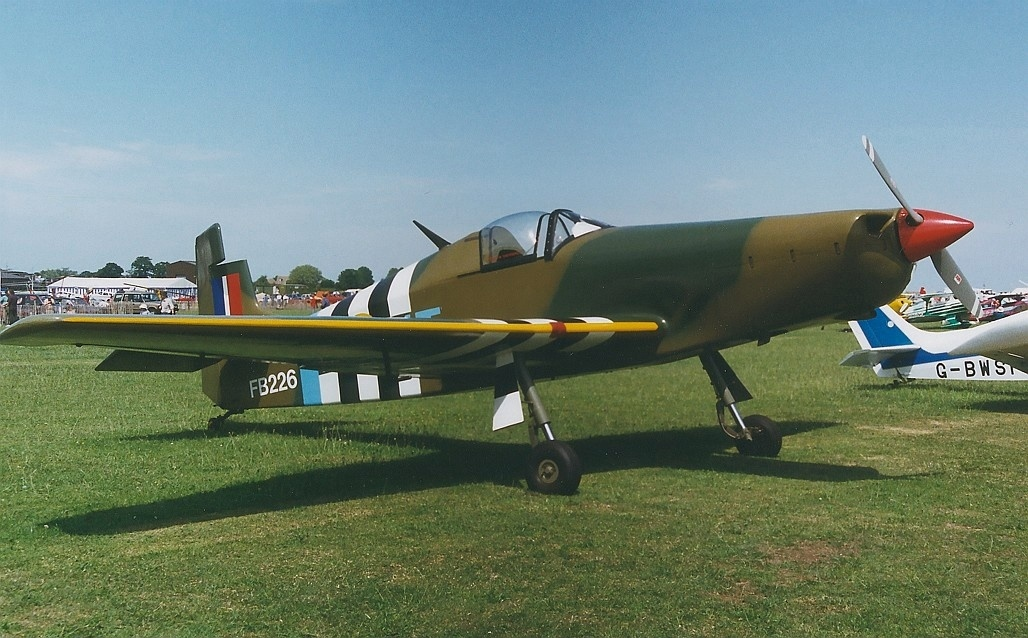

General information
- Type: Homebuilt aircraft
- National origin: England
- Designer: Dave Bonsall

History
- Introduction date: 1991

The Bonsall DB-1 Mustang is a single place, semi-scale P-51 Mustang replica homebuilt aircraft.

== Design and development ==
The Bonsall DB-1 Mustang was constructed over a 16-year span in England by designer Dave Bonsall. The completed aircraft was equipped with a Lycoming O-360 engine obtained from a Socata TB-10 Tobago. It is a single-seat, low-wing aircraft featuring retractable conventional landing gear.

== Specifications (DB-1 Mustang) ==
Data from Sport Aviation

General characteristics

- Crew: 1
- Powerplant: 1 × Lycoming O-360 Horizontally opposed piston aircraft engine, 130 kW (180 hp)

== See also ==
Aircraft of comparable role, configuration, and era

- FK-Lightplanes SW51 Mustang
- Titan T-51 Mustang
- W.A.R. P-51 Mustang
- Linn Mini Mustang
- Stewart S-51D Mustang
- Loehle 5151 Mustang
