= Loehle =

Loehle may refer to:

- Loehle Aircraft, an American aircraft manufacturing company
  - The following aircraft produced by the company:
    - Loehle 5151 Mustang, a replica of the P-51 Mustang
    - Loehle Sport Parasol, an American single-engine ultralight aircraft
    - Loehle Spad XIII, a line of single-engine ultralight aircraft

== People ==
- Alan Loehle (born 1954), American painter and professor at Oglethorpe University
