= Cameron P-51G =

Turboprop replica of P-51 Mustang

P-51G

General information
- Type: Two-seat turboprop homebuilt aircraft
- National origin: United States
- Manufacturer: Cameron & Sons Aircraft
- Designer: Murdo Cameron
- Number built: 1

History
- First flight: 1998

The Cameron P-51G (originally Cameron Grand 51) is an American two-seat turboprop representation of the 1940s North American P-51 Mustang, designed and built by Cameron & Sons Aircraft of Coeur d'Alene, Idaho for sale as completed aircraft or kits for amateur construction.

== Design and development ==
The P-51G is a full-size representation of the second world war Mustang. The design was started in 1988 with a first flight in 1998. It was displayed in public at Oshkosh in July 1998 as the Grand 51 but was subsequently renamed the P-51G.

The P-51G is a low-wing cantilever monoplane with an airframe made from carbon fiber epoxy. Of similar lines to the original Mustang, the prototype was fitted with a 1,450 hp (1,081 kW) Lycoming T53-L-701A turboprop with a three-bladed tractor propeller from an Grumman OV-1D Mohawk. The P-51G has a hydraulically operated retractable conventional landing gear with a retractable tailwheel. The main landing gear utilize components from North American T-6 landing gear. The two-seat cockpit has the pilot and passenger in tandem under a hinged one-piece canopy, the company does have a P-51D-style framed canopy available as an option. The Mustang-style under-fuselage air scoop is a dummy that provides a baggage compartment.

The design blends features of various P-51 models. The fuselage closely resembles the P-51D, but has features from the light weight P-51G model. The wing uses the P-51H model wing and has been shortened to 32 feet. The wet wing design holds 450 gallons of fuel.

The prototype aircraft does not have flaps since the turbine engine propeller has beta control to assist in stopping.

A production agreement to assemble complete aircraft was made in 1996 with Exclusive Aviation located in Fargo, North Dakota to build two aircraft. Cameron supplied an engine and parts for the two aircraft. SPW Associates entered into a loan agreement with Exclusive Aviation in 1997. In 1998 Exclusive Aviation had defaulted on this loan. On August 18, 1998, a “Transfer of Collateral Upon Peaceable Foreclosure and Renunciation” granting possession of the completed first airplane to SPW was signed. In May 1999, Cameron filed a lien against the airplane with the FAA. The ownership of the sole aircraft has been in litigation from the 2002 until 2006 when the North Dakota Supreme Court ruled that the aircraft belonged to SPW Associates. After the North Dakota Supreme Court judgement, the aircraft was put for sale.

== Specifications ==
Data from Jane's All the World's Aircraft 2003-2004

General characteristics

- Crew: one
- Capacity: two
- Length: 36 ft 0 in (10.97 m)
- Wingspan: 37 ft 0 in (11.28 m)
- Height: 10 ft 9 in (3.28 m)
- Wing area: 233.0 sq ft (21.65 m^{2})
- Aspect ratio: 5.9
- Empty weight: 4,500 lb (2,041 kg)
- Gross weight: 8,000 lb (3,628 kg)
- Powerplant: 1 × Lycoming T53-L-701A turboprop , 1450 hp (1081 kW)

Performance

- Maximum speed: 450 mph (724 km/h, 390 kn)
- Cruise speed: 360 mph (579 km/h, 310 kn)
- Stall speed: 96 mph (155 km/h, 83 kn)
- Range: 1,250 mi (2,011 km, 1,090 nmi)
- Service ceiling: 30,000 ft (9,144 m)
- g limits: ±8
- Rate of climb: 4,200 ft/min (21.34 m/s)

== See also ==
- North American P-51 Mustang
- Stewart S-51D Mustang
- Jurca Gnatsum
- W.A.R. P-51 Mustang
- Loehle 5151 Mustang
- Papa 51 Thunder Mustang
- FK-Lightplanes SW51 Mustang
