= Linn Mini Mustang =

Mini Mustang

General information
- Type: Homebuilt aircraft
- National origin: United States
- Designer: Charles Linn

History
- Introduction date: 1962
- First flight: 1962

The Mini Mustang was a scale replica of the P-51 Mustang. It featured aluminium construction and manual retractable landing gear.

== Operational history ==
After the crash of the first prototype, two new aircraft were built of a new design.

== Variants ==
- The L1 Mustang was the original prototype. The original crashed in 1966.
- The L2 Mustang featured longer canopy, balanced elevators, reshaped engine cowling and air-scoop, and a four-blade propeller replacing the two-blade ones.

== Specifications Mini Mustang ==
Data from

General characteristics

- Crew: 1
- Wingspan: 16 ft (4.9 m)
- Wing area: 50 sq ft (4.6 m^{2})
- Empty weight: 480 lb (218 kg)
- Gross weight: 850 lb (386 kg)
- Powerplant: 1 × Lycoming 0-290-G , 125 hp (93 kW)
- Propellers: 4-bladed Hegy, wood

Performance

- Maximum speed: 200 kn (230 mph, 370 km/h)
- Cruise speed: 200 kn (230 mph, 370 km/h)
- Range: 430 nmi (500 mi, 800 km)

== See also ==
Aircraft of comparable role, configuration, and era

- FK-Lightplanes SW51 Mustang
- Stewart S-51D Mustang
- Titan T-51 Mustang
- W.A.R. P-51 Mustang
- Jurca Gnatsum
- Loehle 5151 Mustang
