= Titan T-51 Mustang =

American homebuilt airplane

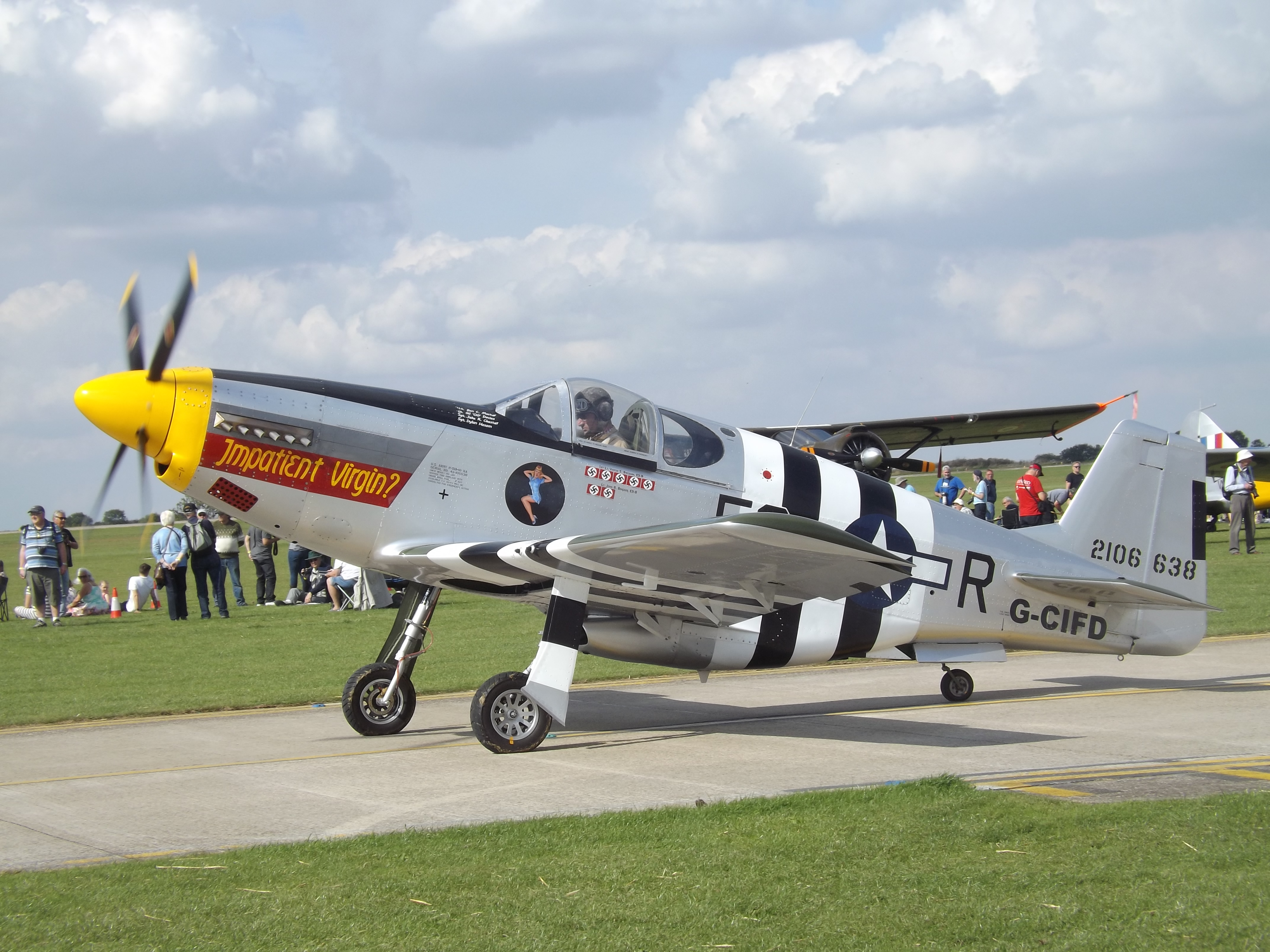

General information
- Type: Kit aircraft
- National origin: United States
- Manufacturer: Titan Aircraft
- Designer: John Williams
- Status: In production
- Number built: 28 (Sept. 2012)

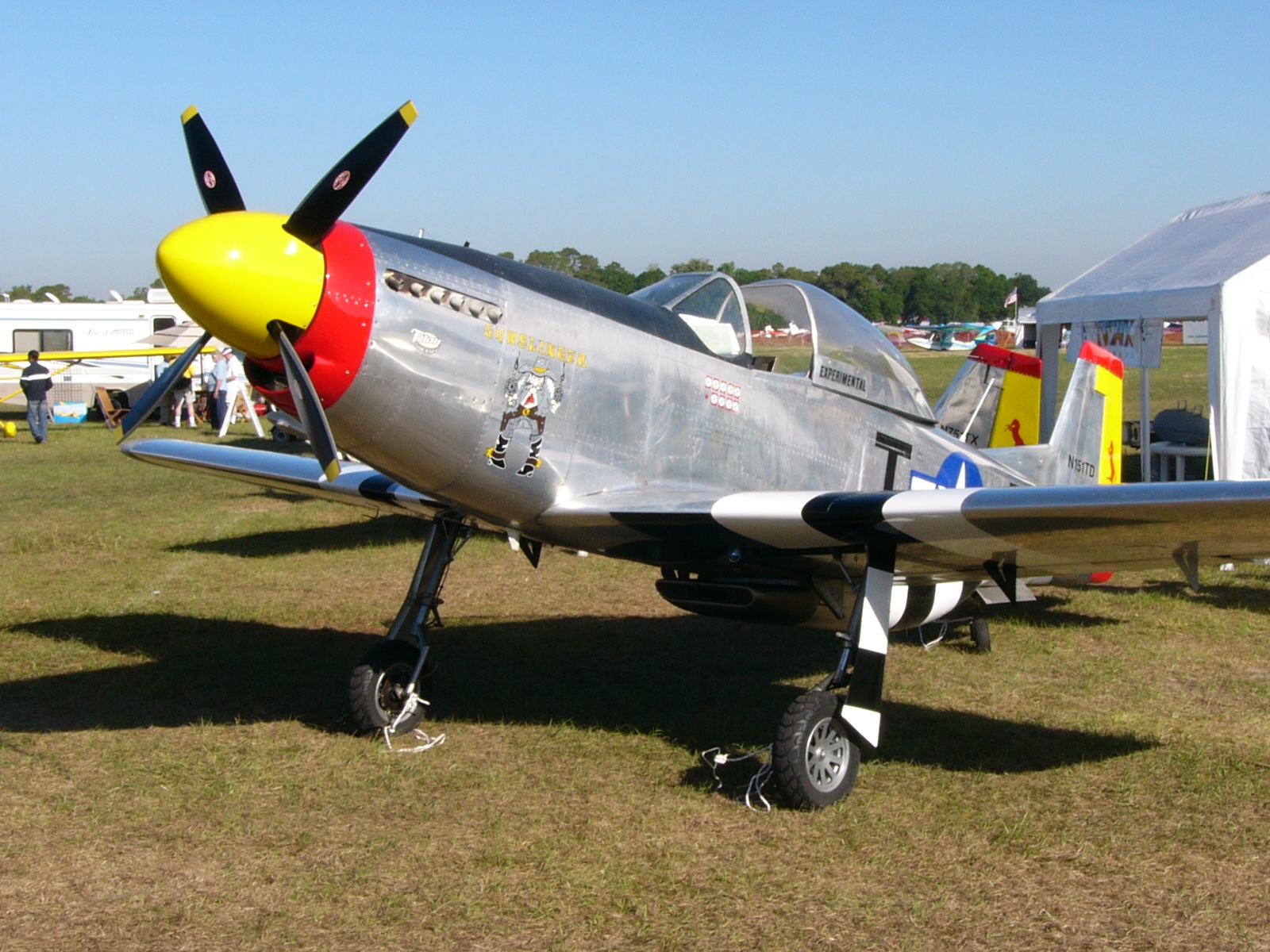
Titan T-51

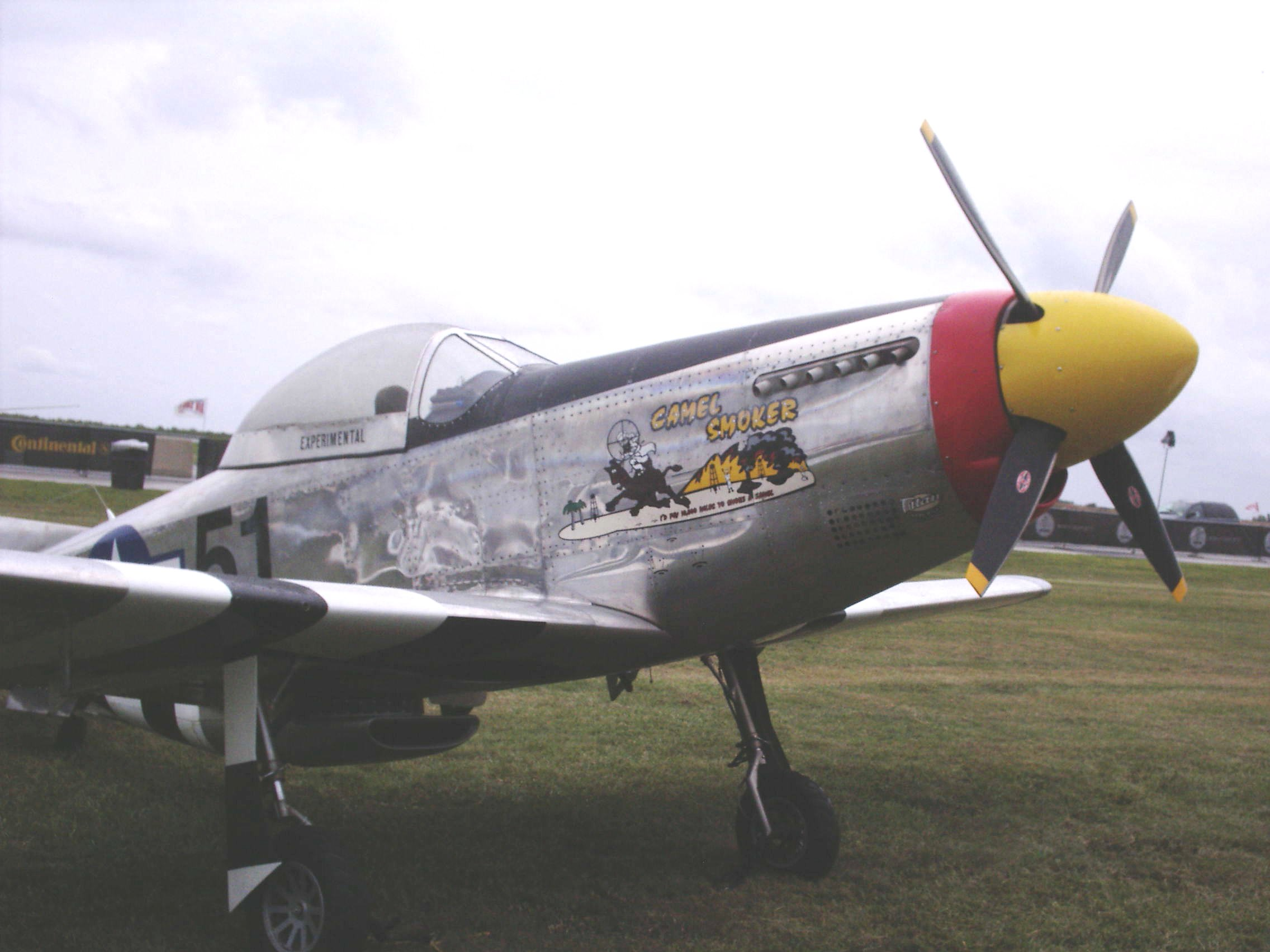
Titan T-51

The Titan T-51 Mustang is a three-quarter scale replica of the P-51 Mustang that was designed by Titan Aircraft owner John Williams. It is a two-seat homebuilt aircraft with dual controls and tandem seats, and has remarkable performance given the small size of the engine.

T-51 kits are fabricated by Titan Aircraft Company at South Austinburg, Ohio in the United States and are being assembled and flown in several countries where they are popular with pilots and particularly with spectators at airshows. The aircraft has a wide range of handling abilities, from a stall speed of only 39 mph (63 km/h) to high performance up to 197 mph (317 km/h) and agility afforded by a +6g / -4g load limit capability.

Titan has a long history with building a variety of aircraft to be flown under ultralight regulations, now including the FAA Light-sport Aircraft category. Pilots choose whether they want to buy a kitset which is fully complete and ready to assemble or a basic kitset to which they add their own choices of propellers, engines, and instruments. Two versions are available: the homebuilt with retractable gear which must be flown by pilots with retractable gear experience and the amateur built fixed-landing-gear version which qualifies for the 1,200 lb (540 kg) and under weight category in New Zealand and Australia and can be flown by a sport pilot in the US.

When scaled down, the Titan T-51 is not wide enough to fit a standard aircraft engine, so the Titan T-51 incorporates light-sport and ultralight type aircraft engines. The most frequently applied powerplant is the Rotax 912ULS/3, which produces 100 hp (75 kW), but the Rotax 914 UL3, which produces 115 hp (86 kW), is also fitted by owners wanting even higher performance. Some builders also consider Mazda Rotary engines due to their power-to-weight ratios and their dependability. The current engine of choice for the T-51 is the Suzuki H engine, specifically the H27A 2.7L V6, which generates 185 hp (138 kW).

The construction-to-flying time for the Titan T-51 is about 1400–1600 hours, and jigs or complicated tools are not required.

== Accidents and incidents ==
- On July 6, 2021, a Titan T-51D crashed near Northeast Ohio Regional Airport during takeoff due to loss of engine power, resulting in its left wing substantially damaged.
- On 21 July 2024, the company founder, John Williams, was killed after the T-51 he was flying experienced a propeller overspeed and catastrophic failure during a post-maintenance flight near the Germack Airport in Geneva, Ohio. The pilot attempted an emergency landing on a small road parallel to the runway, but the aircraft contacted a tree prior to touchdown, resulting in fatal injuries to the pilot and sole occupant.

== Specifications ==
Data from

General characteristics

- Crew: 2
- Length: 23 ft 6 in (7.16 m)
- Wingspan: 24 ft 0 in (7.32 m)
- Height: 9 ft 2 in (2.8 m)
- Wing area: 118 sq ft (10.96 m^{2})
- Empty weight: 850 lb (385 kg)
- Gross weight: 1,450 lb (658 kg)
- Powerplant: 1 × Rotax 912ULS 4 cyl, 4 stroke, 100 hp (75 kW)
- Propellers: 4-bladed controllable propeller

Performance

- Maximum speed: 197 mph (317 km/h, 171 kn)
- Cruise speed: 150 mph (241 km/h, 130 kn)
- Stall speed: 39 mph (63 km/h, 34 kn)
- Never exceed speed: 197 mph (317 km/h, 171 kn)
- Range: 720 mi (1,159 km, 630 nmi) with reserve
- Service ceiling: 16,000–18,000 ft (4,877–5,486 m)
- Rate of climb: 1,200 ft/min (6.1 m/s)
- Takeoff run: 300 ft (91 m)
- Landing roll: 300 ft (91 m)

== See also ==
- Stewart S-51D Mustang
- Jurca Gnatsum
- W.A.R. P-51 Mustang
- Loehle 5151 Mustang
- Papa 51 Thunder Mustang
- Cameron P-51G
- FK-Lightplanes SW51 Mustang
