= War Aircraft Replicas International =

American homebuilt warbird replica manufacturer

War Aircraft Replicas International, Inc.
- Company type: Private company
- Industry: Aerospace
- Founded: 1974
- Headquarters: Tulsa, Oklahoma, United States
- Products: Kit aircraft
- Website: www.flywaraircraft.com

War Aircraft Replicas International, Inc. is an American aircraft manufacturer, originally located in Brandon, Florida and now Tulsa, Oklahoma, that specializes in kit built replica aircraft of World War II fighters.

The company was founded in California by Warren Erberspacher, Jim Kern, and Ken Thoms after collaborating on the Johnathan Livingston Seagull biplane racer of 1973. The founders were inspired by the scale fighter designs of Marcel Jurca of France, as well as the KR-1 wood and fiberglass construction.

== History ==
Development of the company's first design, the W.A.R. Focke-Wulf 190, commenced in 1973, with the first flight following in 1974. The aircraft are all half-scale World War II fighter aircraft replicas, based on a common design, consisting of a wooden fuselage box shape and wooden spar wing. Polyurethane foam was then used to create the different aircraft shapes and details. The foam was then covered in a high-strength laminating fabric and epoxy-resin. The series all share a common conventional landing gear design that is electrically retractable. The aircraft were initially powered by 1600 cc Volkswagen air cooled engines of 70 hp (52 kW) using Lloyd Paynter’s gear reduction units driving 3-blade Fahlin props, but later Continental O-200 and Lycoming O-235s were used along with the Rotec R2800 radial engine.

The company announced plans for a multitude of replicas that shared the basic layout. The geared Volkswagen engine width required aircraft with larger cowlings to accommodate the size of the engine and radial engine designs were selected for this reason. Molded foam blocks were offered for the following aircraft, however, not all remained in later production. The Corsair and Stuka designs required more complex bent-wing spars.

In 2014 the company was purchased and moved from Brandon Florida to Tulsa, Oklahoma.

== Aircraft ==
- W.A.R. FW-190
- W.A.R. F4U Corsair
- W.A.R. P-47 Thunderbolt
- W.A.R. Hawker Sea Fury
- W.A.R. P-51 Mustang
- W.A.R. P40E
- W.A.R. Japanese Zero
- W.A.R. P-38 Lightning
- W.A.R. BF-109
- W.A.R. TA-152H, "long nose Focke Wulf"
- W.A.R. Macchi C.200 Saetta
- W.A.R. Grumman F8F Bearcat
- W.A.R. Hawker Tempest II
- W.A.R. Hawk 75A-3
- W.A.R. Fokker D.XXI
- W.A.R. F6F-3 Hellcat
- W.A.R. Lavochkin La. 5FN
- W.A.R. Junkers Ju. 87B-2 Stuka, "Inline Czech Walter Minor engine specified".
