= P47 =

P47 or P-47 may refer to:

== Military ==
- HMS P47, a Royal Navy submarine
- INS Khanjar (P47), a corvette of the Indian Navy
- Republic P-47 Thunderbolt, an American fighter aircraft
  - W.A.R. P-47 Thunderbolt, a half-scale replica aircraft
- Hutchinson Air Force Station, ADC ID P-47, a United States Air Force station closed in 1968

== Other uses ==
- P-47: The Phantom Fighter, an arcade video game
- P-47, short for Petrobras 47, a floating storage and offloading facility.
- Papyrus 47, a biblical manuscript
- Phosphorus-47, an isotope of phosphorus
- P47, a Latvian state regional road
