= Papa 51 Thunder Mustang =

Type of aircraft

Thunder Mustang
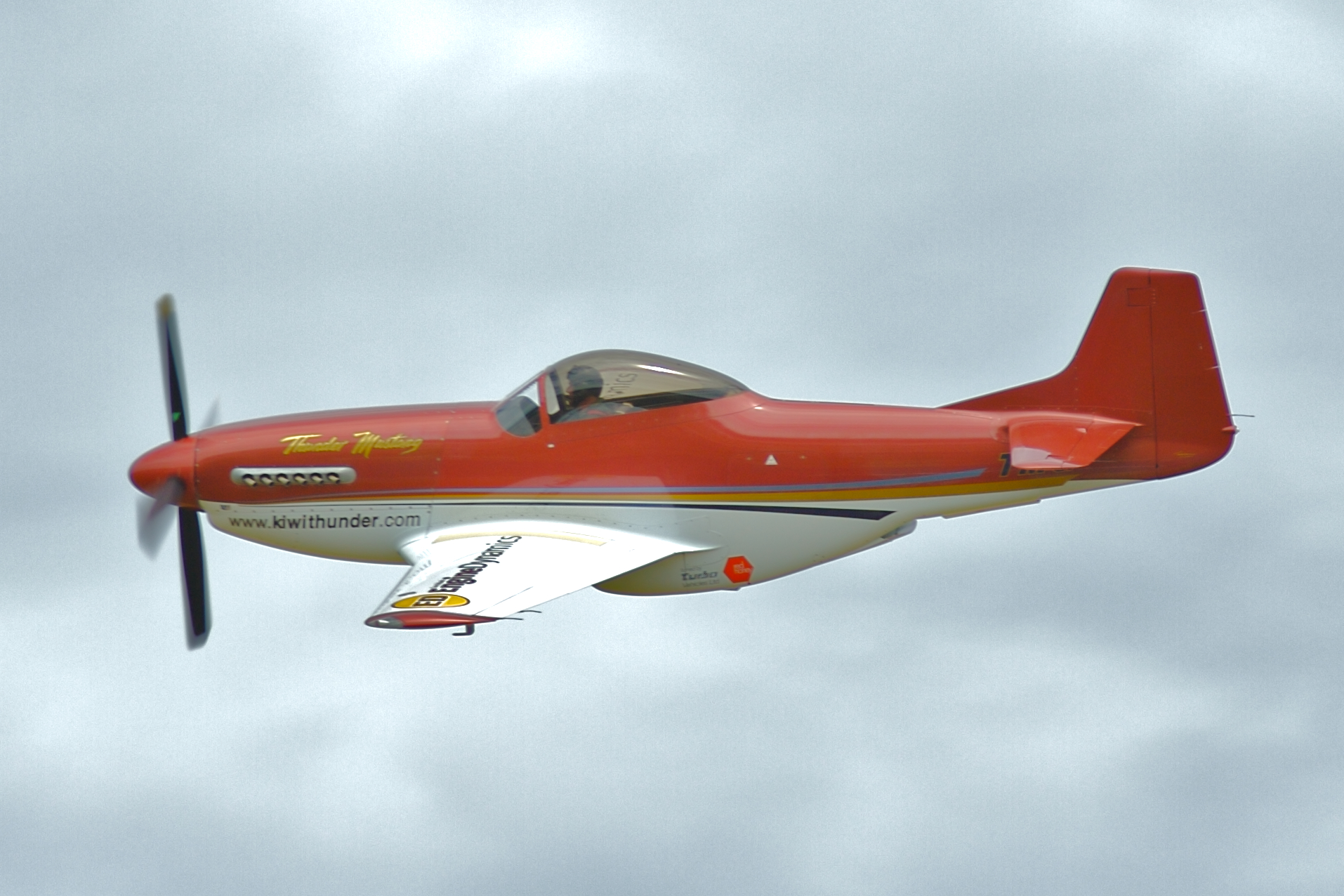
- Thunder Mustang flying at 2007 Wings over Wairarapa airshow

General information
- Type: Replica
- Manufacturer: Thunder Mustang LLC
- Status: Renewed Production Stages.
- Number built: 37

The Thunder Mustang is a modern, composite-shell, 0.75-scale kitplane replica of the American P-51 Mustang fighter of World War II, with performance comparable to the original P-51. As the fastest and most-powerful piston-powered kit aircraft available, it is the leader of pack of the various piston-powered, high-performance P-51 replica kits -- which include the Titan Aircraft T-51, (a welded steel airframe with secondary monocoque aluminum shell), and the all-aluminum Stewart S-51D -- though outrun by the full-scale, turbine-powered Cameron P-51G.

== Design and development ==
The Thunder Mustang is a 3/4-scale composite kitplane replica of the P-51 Mustang, powered by a modern, 640-horsepower, normally aspirated, water-cooled Falconer V-12 piston engine, enabling speeds approaching that of the original P-51 fighter. It is a low-wing, monocoque design, with retractable, conventional (tailwheel) landing gear.

It is currently in renewed production stages. Production ceased in the fall of 1999. The Thunder Builders Group LLC of Richmond, Texas owned the assets required to manufacture the airplane in September 2010, when they sold the assets to Dean Holt of Mount Vernon, Washington. Dean is currently in the process of manufacturing all the necessary components for complete kit offerings, which will be available in late fall 2011.

== Operational history ==
There were a total of 37 complete or partial kits produced, including the prototype. Of these 37, 27 were delivered as complete kits including the Falconer engine. Two have Walter turbines installed and presently flying.

Four Thunder Mustangs have competed at the Reno Air Races. John Parker has recorded lap speeds of more than 355 mph on the racecourse using the normally aspirated Falconer engine in his Thunder Mustang Blue Thunder II. Parker perished in a landing incident at Reno Stead on May 1, 2018. George Giboney posted lap speeds of 397 mph with his supercharged version of the Falconer engine during the 2010 races, with level flight top speed of more than 415 mph.

On January 4, 2020, a Thunder Mustang crashed in Santa Clarita, California, killing the pilot.

| Specifications | Thunder Mustang | North American P-51D Mustang |
|---|---|---|
| Powerplant | Falconer V-12 640 horsepower (480 kW) | Rolls-Royce Merlin V-1650-7 1,490 hp (1,110 kW) |
| Displacement | 601 cubic inches (9,850 cm^{3}) | 1,649 cubic inches (27,020 cm^{3}) |
| Propeller | MT 94 in (2,400 mm) diameter 4-bladed constant speed | Hamilton Standard 134 in (3,400 mm) diameter 4-bladed |
| Length | 24.2 ft (7.4 m) | 32.2 ft (9.8 m) |
| Frontal Area | 8.1 sq ft (0.75 m^{2}) | 13.4 sq ft (1.24 m^{2}) |
| Wing Span | 23.8 ft (7.3 m) | 37.0 ft (11.3 m) |
| Wing Area | 104 sq ft (9.7 m^{2}) | 237.75 sq ft (22.088 m^{2}) |
| Wing Loading | 28.84 lb/sq ft (140.81 kg/m^{2}) | 49.2 lb/sq ft (240.22 kg/m^{2}) |
| Power Loading | 0.2 hp/lb (0.329 kW/kg) | 0.13 hp/lb (0.22 kW/kg) |
| Gross Weight | 3,200 lb (1,500 kg) | 11,600 lb (5,300 kg) |
| Empty Weight | 2,200 lb (1,000 kg) | 7,635 lb (3,463 kg) |
| Useful Load | 1,000 lb (450 kg) | 3,965 lb (1,798 kg) |
| Payload w/full Fuel | 400 lb (180 kg) | 2,885 lb (1,309 kg) |
| Basic Fuel Capacity | 102 imp gal (460 L) (in wings) | 180 imp gal (820 L) (in wings) |
| Baggage Capacity | 50 lb (23 kg) | N/A |
| Performance | | |
| Rate of Climb @ gross | 86.666 ft/s (26.416 m/s) | 46.666 ft/s (14.224 m/s) |
| Maximum Level Speed @ Sea Level | 326 kn (375 mph; 604 km/h) | 326 kn (375 mph; 604 km/h) (380 kn (437 mph; 704 km/h) @ 25,000 ft (7,620 m)) |
| Cruise Speed @ 75% Power | 300 kn (345 mph; 556 km/h) | 250 kn (288 mph; 463 km/h) |
| Fuel Consumption | 22 to 25 imperial gallons (100 to 110 L) per hour | 50 to 75 imperial gallons (230 to 340 L) per hour |
| Range | 1,300 mi (2,092 km) | 700 mi (1,127 km) |
| Service Ceiling | 25,000 ft (7,600 m) | 46,000 ft (14,000 m) |
| Limiting and Recommended Airspeeds | | |
| Vx (best angle of climb) | 87 kn (100 mph; 161 km/h) | 87 kn (100 mph; 161 km/h) |
| Vy (best rate of climb) | 156 kn (180 mph; 289 km/h) | 148 kn (170 mph; 274 km/h) |
| Va (design maneuvering) | 222 kn (255 mph; 411 km/h) | 226 kn (260 mph; 419 km/h) |
| Vfe (max flaps extended) | 165 kn (190 mph; 306 km/h) | 143 kn (165 mph; 265 km/h) |
| Vle (max landing gear extended) | 148 kn (170 mph; 274 km/h) | 148 kn (170 mph; 274 km/h) |
| Vne (never exceed) | 439 kn (505 mph; 813 km/h) | 439 kn (505 mph; 813 km/h) |
| Vsl (stall, clean) | 77 kn (89 mph; 143 km/h) | 92 kn (106 mph; 170 km/h) |
| Vso (stall, in landing config.) | 68 kn (78 mph; 126 km/h) | 88 kn (101 mph; 163 km/h) |
| Best Glide | 152 kn (175 mph; 282 km/h) | 152 kn (175 mph; 282 km/h) |

== See also ==
- Stewart S-51D Mustang
- FK-Lightplanes SW51 Mustang
- Titan T-51 Mustang
- Jurca Gnatsum
- W.A.R. P-51 Mustang
- Loehle 5151 Mustang
- Cameron P-51G
