= R2800 =

R2800 may refer to the following engines:

- Pratt & Whitney R-2800 Double Wasp, a vintage American 18-cylinder, air-cooled radial aircraft engine
- Rotec R2800, a contemporary Australian seven-cylinder, air-cooled radial aircraft engine
