= W.A.R. Hawker Sea Fury =

American homebuilt warbird replica

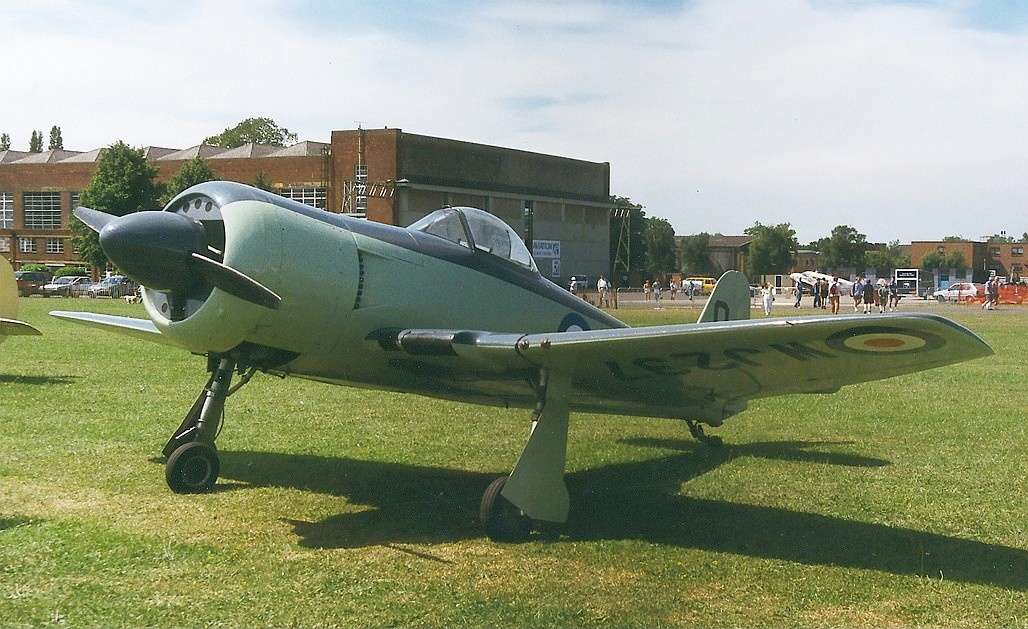

General information
- Type: Homebuilt aircraft
- National origin: United States
- Manufacturer: War Aircraft Replicas International, Inc.

History
- First flight: 1986

The W.A.R. Hawker Sea Fury is a half-scale homebuilt replica of a Hawker Sea Fury carrier fighter produced by War Aircraft Replicas International for amateur construction.

The first example was built in England, and flew in 1986.

== Specifications (W.A.R. Hawker Sea Fury) ==
General characteristics

- Crew: 1
- Capacity: 1
- Empty weight: 600 lb (272 kg)
- Gross weight: 900 lb (408 kg)
- Powerplant: 1 × Continental O-200 , 100 hp (75 kW)

Performance

- Maximum speed: 143 kn (165 mph, 266 km/h)
- Cruise speed: 117 kn (135 mph, 217 km/h)
- Stall speed: 48 kn (55 mph, 89 km/h)
- Range: 350 nmi (400 mi, 640 km)
- Wing loading: 12 lb/sq ft (59 kg/m^{2})
