= W.A.R. F4U Corsair =

American homebuilt warbird replica

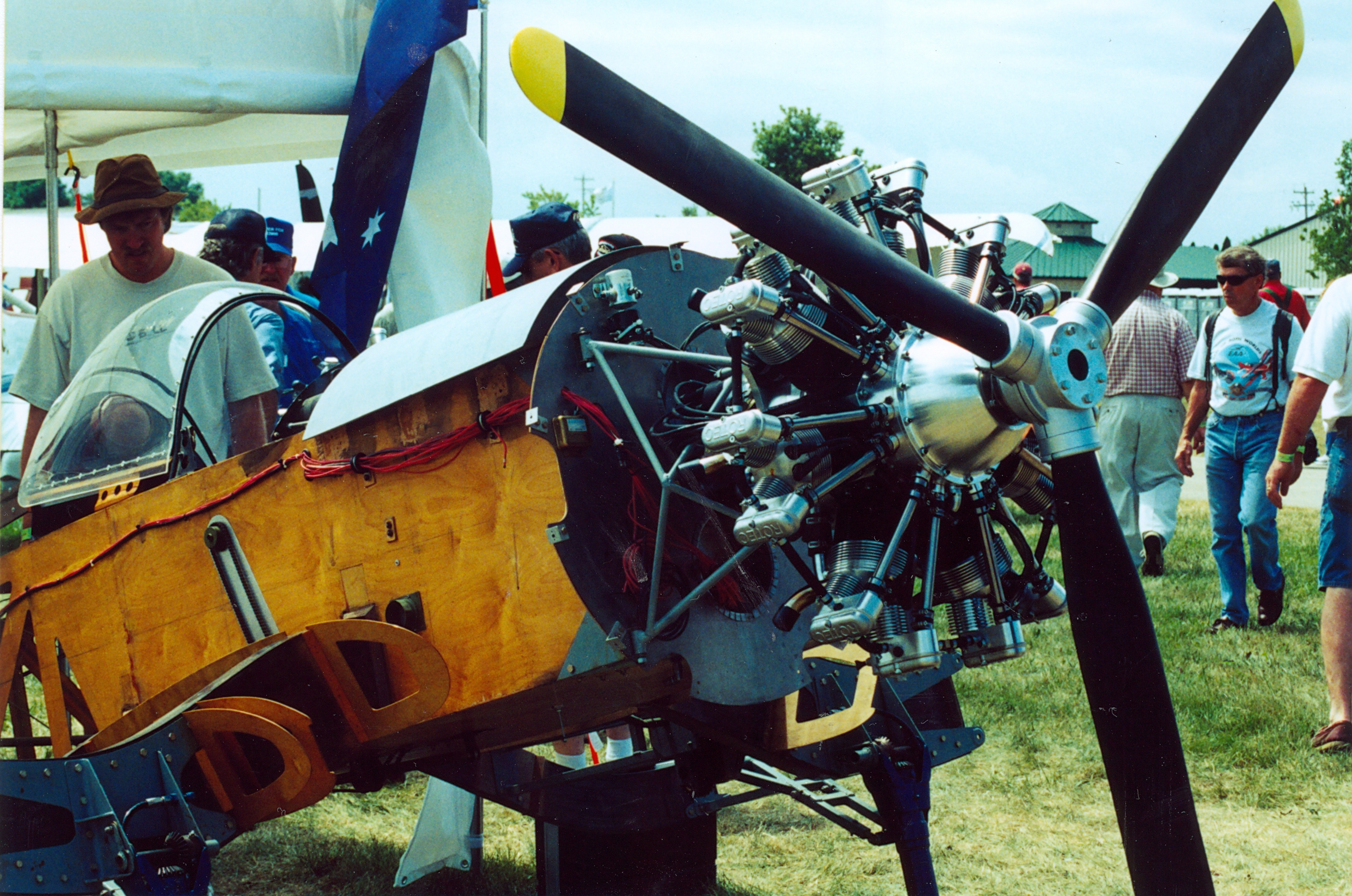
- Corsair displayed with a Rotec R2800 engine while under construction.

General information
- Type: Homebuilt aircraft
- National origin: United States
- Manufacturer: War Aircraft Replicas International, Inc.

History
- Introduction date: 1975

The W.A.R. F4U Corsair is a 50% scale homebuilt replica of the Chance-Vought F4U Corsair Second World War carrier fighter.

== Design and development ==
The aircraft is a single place, single engine gull-wing design with retractable conventional landing gear. The F4U was the second completed aircraft in the W.A.R. series, with the first example displayed at the EAA airshow in 1975. The aircraft featured folding wings.

== Operational history ==
A WAR F4U built by Fred Bauer Jr. was featured as the cover plane on the January 1980 Popular Mechanics. The plane was built from plans that cost $145.

== Variants ==
Some versions were built using 125 hp (93 kW) Lycoming O-235 and 123 hp (92 kW) HCI radial engines. One example was built using a Rotec R2800 radial engine.

== Specifications (W.A.R. F4U Corsair) ==
Data from Jane's All The World's Aircraft 1988–89

General characteristics

- Crew: 1
- Length: 16 ft 6 in (5.03 m)
- Wingspan: 20 ft 0 in (6.10 m)
- Height: 5 ft 0 in (1.52 m)
- Empty weight: 912 lb (414 kg)
- Gross weight: 1,200 lb (544 kg)
- Powerplant: 1 × Continental O-200-A air-cooled flat-four, 100 hp (75 kW)

Performance

- Maximum speed: 147 kn (169 mph, 272 km/h)
- Cruise speed: 105 kn (121 mph, 195 km/h)
- Range: 347 nmi (399 mi, 643 km)
- Rate of climb: 1,400 ft/min (7.1 m/s)
