= Airdrome Nieuport 28 =

American fighter repica

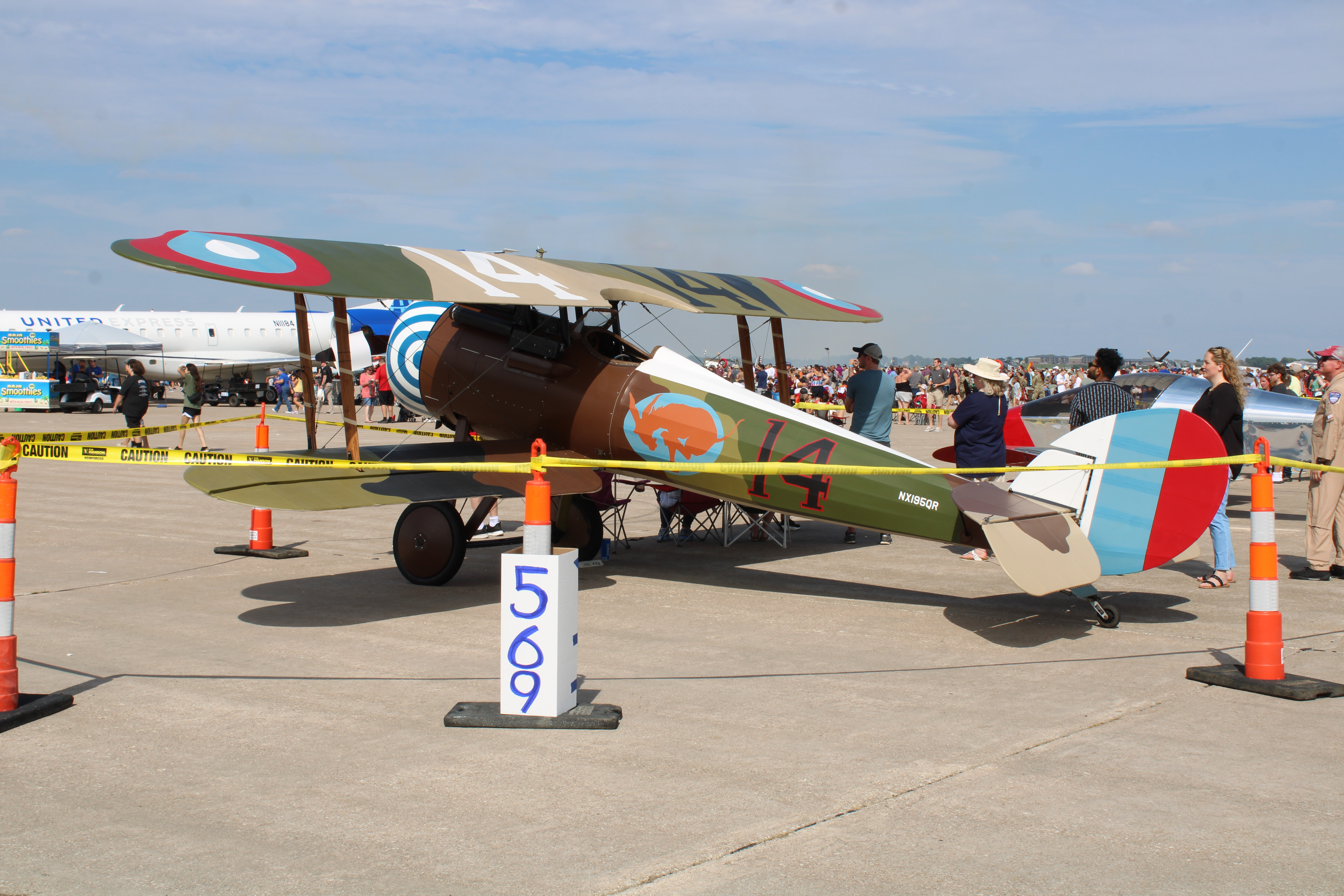

General information
- Type: Amateur-built aircraft
- National origin: United States
- Manufacturer: Airdrome Aeroplanes
- Status: In production (2011)
- Number built: 2 (2011)

History
- Developed from: Nieuport 28

The Airdrome Nieuport 28 is an American amateur-built aircraft, designed and produced by Airdrome Aeroplanes, of Holden, Missouri. The aircraft is supplied as a kit for amateur construction.

The aircraft is a full-scale replica of the First World War French Nieuport 28 fighter. The replica is built from modern materials and powered by modern engines.

== Design and development ==
The Airdrome Nieuport 28 features a strut-braced biplane layout, a single-seat open cockpit, fixed conventional landing gear and a single engine in tractor configuration.

The aircraft is made from aluminum tubing and gussets which are pull riveted together. Its flying surfaces covered in aircraft fabric. The kit is made up of twelve sub-kits. The Airdrome Nieuport 28 has a wingspan of 25 ft (7.6 m) and a wing area of 204 sq ft (19.0 m^{2}). It can be equipped with engines ranging from 110 to 150 hp (82 to 112 kW). The standard engine used is the 110 hp (82 kW) four stroke Rotec R2800 radial engine. Building time from the factory-supplied kit is estimated at 500 hours by the manufacturer.

== Operational history ==
Two examples had been completed by December 2011.

== Specifications (Nieuport 28) ==
Data from Kitplanes

General characteristics

- Crew: one
- Length: 24 ft (7.3 m)
- Wingspan: 25 ft (7.6 m)
- Wing area: 204 sq ft (19.0 m^{2})
- Empty weight: 812 lb (368 kg)
- Gross weight: 1,212 lb (550 kg)
- Fuel capacity: 14 U.S. gallons (53 L; 12 imp gal)
- Powerplant: 1 × Rotec R2800 seven cylinder, air-cooled, four stroke radial engine, 110 hp (82 kW)
- Propellers: 2-bladed wooden

Performance

- Cruise speed: 84 mph (135 km/h, 73 kn)
- Stall speed: 39 mph (63 km/h, 34 kn)
- Range: 200 mi (320 km, 170 nmi)
- Rate of climb: 900 ft/min (4.6 m/s)
- Wing loading: 5.9 lb/sq ft (29 kg/m^{2})
