= W.A.R. P40E =

American homebuilt warbird replica

General information
- Type: Homebuilt aircraft
- National origin: United States
- Manufacturer: War Aircraft Replicas International, Inc.

The W.A.R. P40E is a near-scale homebuilt replica of a Curtis P-40 Warhawk fighter.

== Variants ==
Some versions were built using 125 hp (93 kW) Lycoming O-235 and 123 hp (92 kW) HCI radial engines.

== Specifications (W.A.R. P40E) ==
General characteristics

- Crew: 1
- Capacity: 1
- Length: 19 ft (5.8 m)
- Wingspan: 22 ft (6.7 m)
- Empty weight: 600 lb (272 kg)
- Gross weight: 900 lb (408 kg)
- Powerplant: 1 × Continental O-200 , 100 hp (75 kW)
- Propellers: 3-bladed Ground Adjustable

Performance

- Maximum speed: 143 kn (165 mph, 266 km/h)
- Cruise speed: 120 kn (140 mph, 230 km/h)
- Stall speed: 43 kn (50 mph, 80 km/h)
- Never exceed speed: 180 kn (210 mph, 340 km/h)
- Range: 350 nmi (400 mi, 640 km)
- Wing loading: 12 lb/sq ft (59 kg/m^{2})
