= Northeast Ohio Regional Airport =

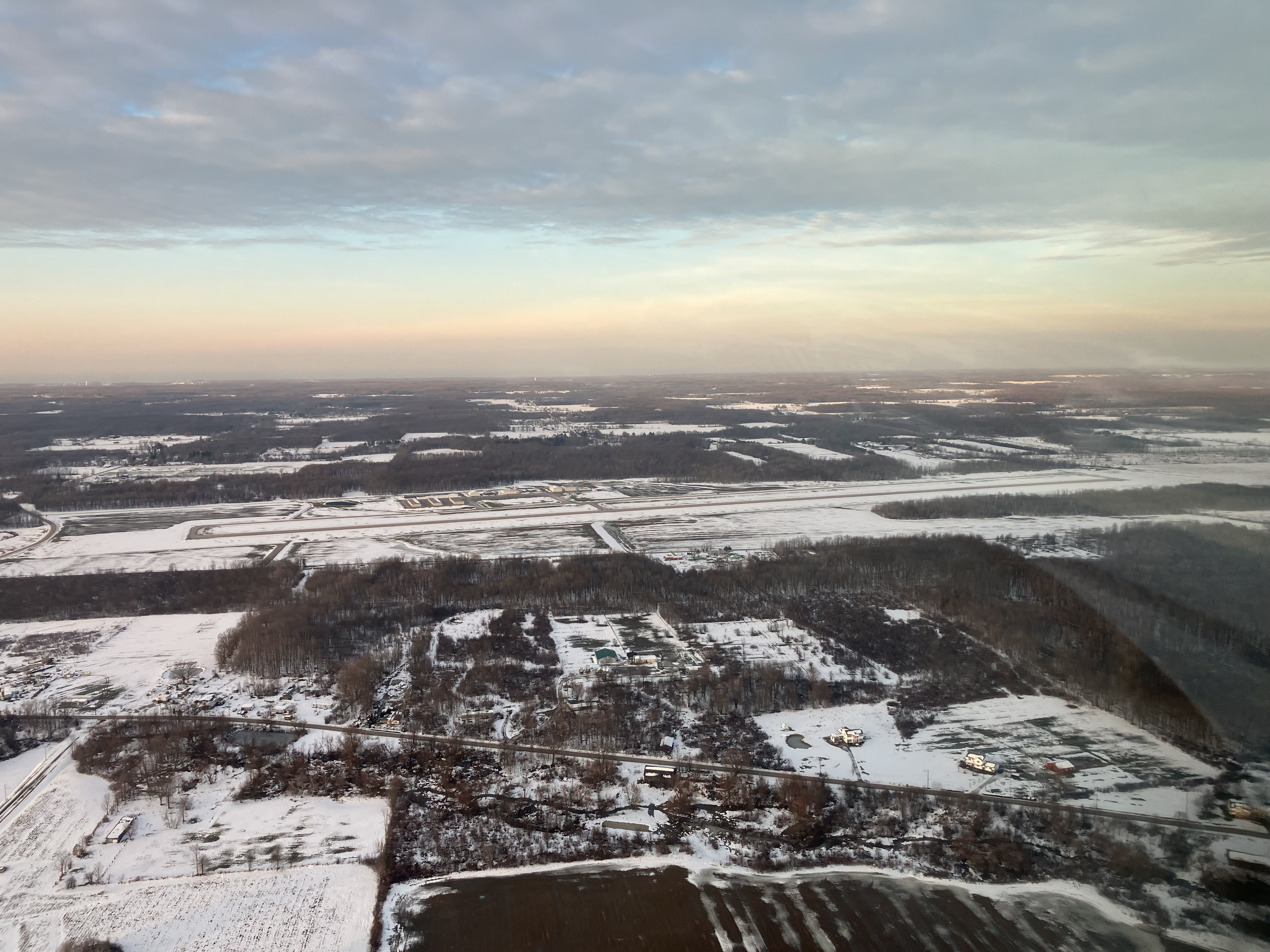
- IATA: JFN; ICAO: KHZY; FAA LID: HZY

Summary
- Airport type: Public
- Owner: Ashtabula County Airport Authority
- Operator: Ashtabula County Airport Authority
- Serves: Ashtabula County, Ohio
- Location: Jefferson, Ohio
- Time zone: UTC−05:00 (-5)
  - Summer (DST): UTC−04:00 (-4)
- Elevation AMSL: 926 ft (282 m)
- Coordinates: 41°46′41″N 080°41′44″W
- Website: flyhzy.com

Maps
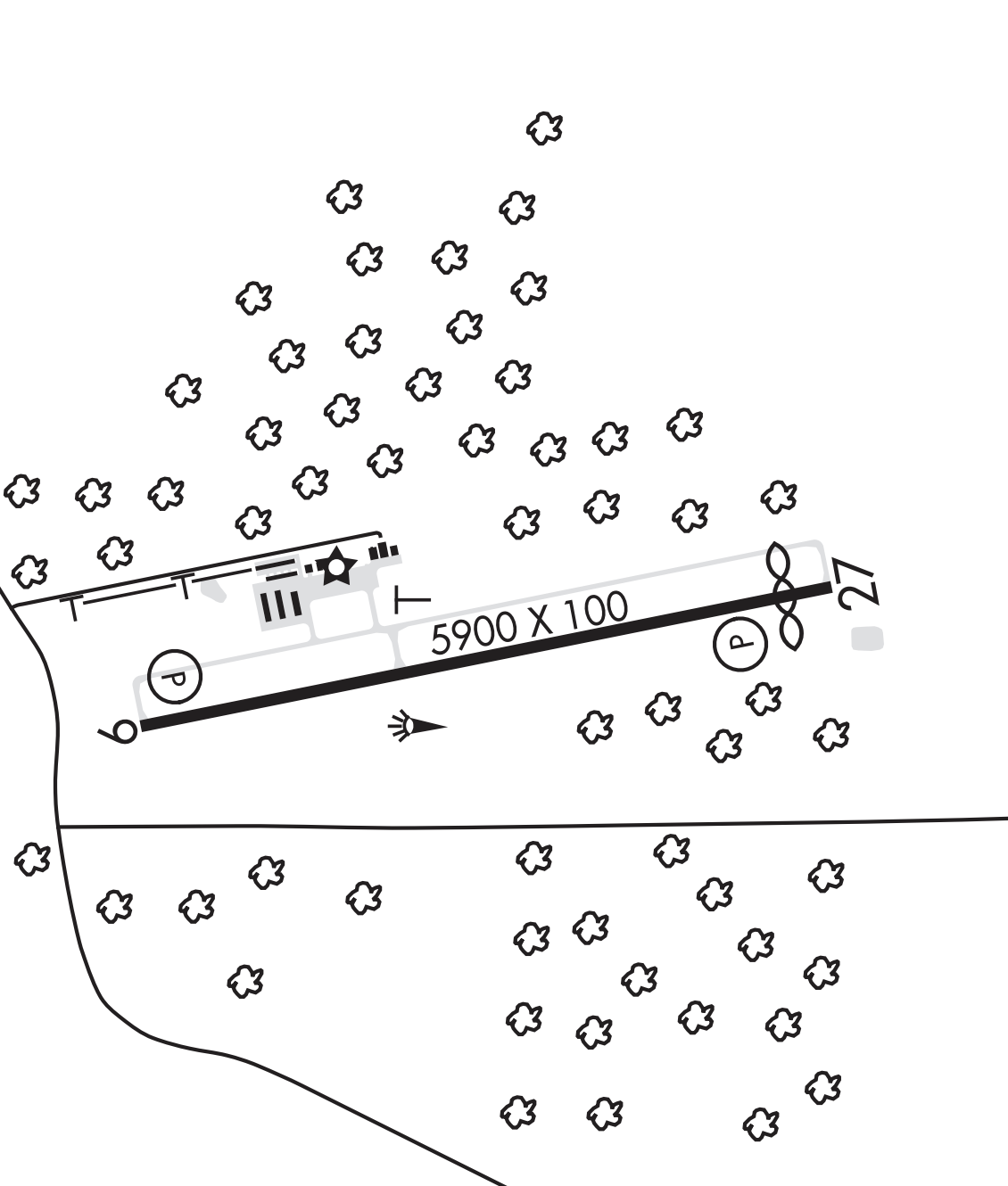

- Location of airport in Ohio HZY (the United States)

Runways
Direction	Length		Surface
Direction	ft	m	Surface
9/27	5,900	1,798	Grooved Asphalt

Statistics (2021)
- Aircraft operations: 1,196
- Based aircraft: 19
- Source: Federal Aviation Administration

Northeast Ohio Regional Airport (IATA: JFN, ICAO: KHZY, FAA LID: HZY), owned and operated by the Ashtabula County Airport Authority, is a public-use airport in Ashtabula County, Ohio, United States, eight nautical miles (15 km) southeast of the central business district of the city of Ashtabula. Airport is located in Denmark Township near the Village of Jefferson, which is the County Seat of Ashtabula County. The airport is located in the village of Jefferson, about 10 miles (16 km) south of Lake Erie. According to the FAA's National Plan of Integrated Airport Systems for 2009–2013, it is classified as a general aviation airport.

Although most U.S. airports use the same three-letter location identifier for the FAA and IATA, Northeast Ohio Regional Airport is assigned HZY by the FAA and JFN by the IATA.

The airport hosts regular events for pilots and other locals. In 2022, it hosted an Aviation Career Day for local high school students. There is also a regular "Run the Runway" 5K and 1 Mile running race at the airport.

== History ==
The Ashtabula County Airport Authority, which owns the airport, was started in 1965 for the purpose of developing an airport that can serve as an economic driver. A 520-acre (210 ha) site, one of twelve evaluated, was selected in early December 1965. The following day, the city of Ashtabula announced it would not provide any financial support due to the chosen location being too far from it. It was approved for a $210,000 federal grant in late April 1967. Construction on the airport had started by early June.

A 17,000 sq ft (1,600 m^{2}) hangar had been built at the airport by mid-June 1969. Prior to that, an eight plane T-hangar had been completed.

By mid June 2009, the airport was struggling financially and was forced to obtain emergency funding from the county.

The facility was renamed the Northeast Ohio Regional Airport in 2012 and the FAA recognized the name in early 2013.

The airport underwent an upgrade to reconstruct the runway and bring it into compliance with Category II approach minimums. The Federal Aviation Administration provided $7.4 million to the airport for the project, which began in 2017.

== Facilities and aircraft ==
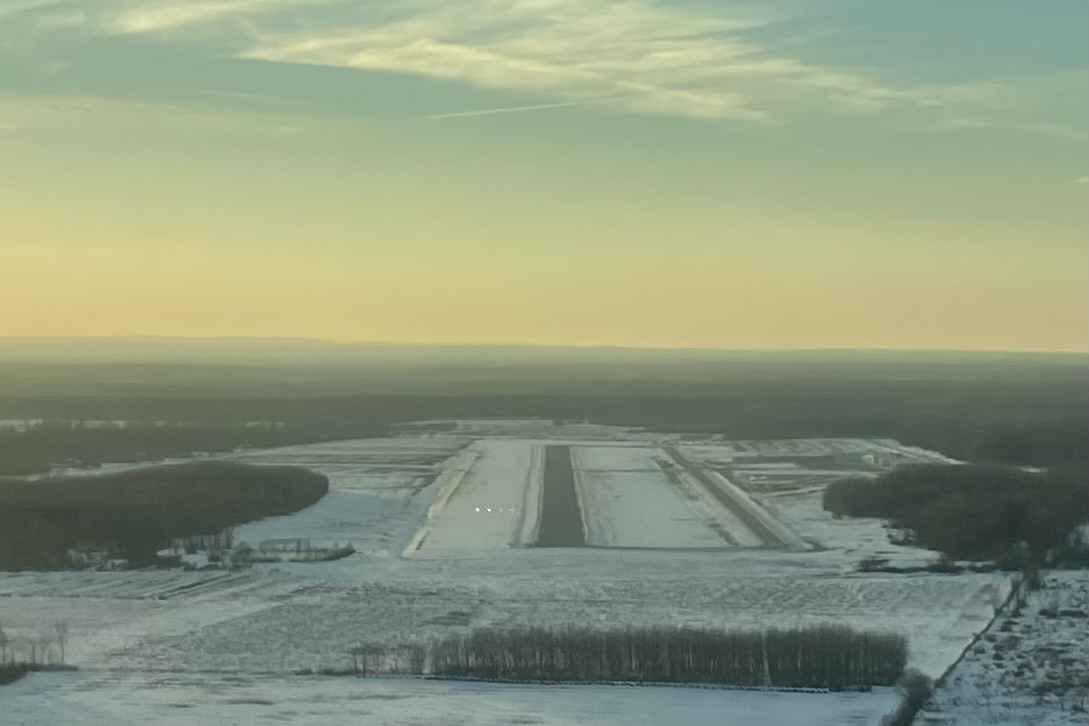
Landing on Runway 27

Northeast Ohio Regional Airport covers an area of 737 acres (298 ha) at an elevation of 926 feet (282 m) above mean sea level. It has one runway designated 9/27 with a grooved asphalt surface measuring 5,900 by 100 feet (1,798 x 30 m).

For the 12-month period ending October 12, 2021, the airport had 1,196 aircraft operations, an average of 23 per week: 88% general aviation, 12% air taxi, and <1% military. This is down from 16,886 operations in 2017.

For the same time period in 2021, 19 aircraft were based at the airport: 17 single-engine airplanes, 1 multi-engine airplane, and 1 jet.

The airport has a fixed-base operator that sells fuel – both avgas and jet fuel – and offers services such as catering, courtesy transportation, ground power, conference rooms, a crew lounge, showers, and more.

== Accidents ==
- On July 6, 2021, a Titan T-51D crashed during takeoff due to loss of engine power, resulting in its left wing substantially damaged.

== See also ==
- List of airports in Ohio
