= Loehle 5151 Mustang =

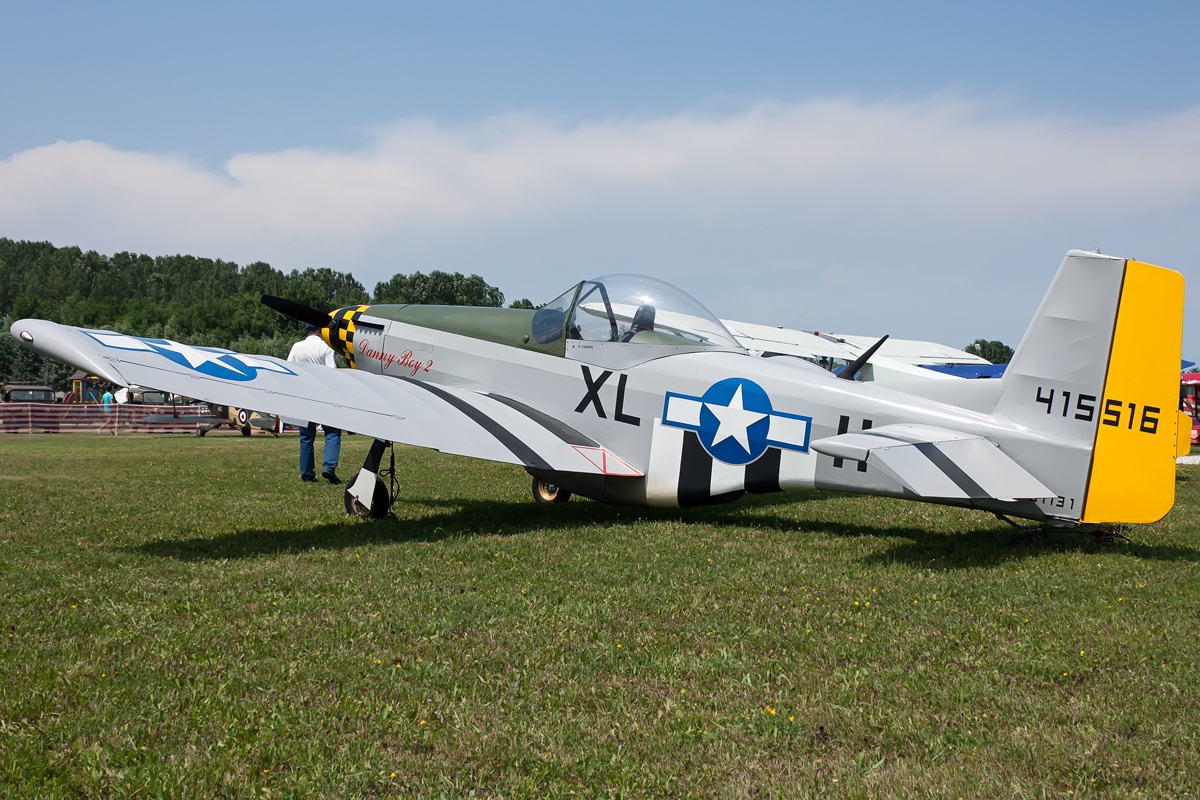

General information
- Type: Replica scale warbird
- National origin: United States
- Manufacturer: Loehle Aircraft
- Designer: Carl Loehle
- Number built: 110 (2011)

History
- Introduction date: 1988

The Loehle 5151 Mustang is a 3/4 scale replica of the P-51 Mustang, designed by American designer Carl Loehle. Its plans are provided for amateur builders. The aircraft has a wooden fuselage with fabric covering.

== Development ==
The wings are wood construction with geodetic supporting structure. The handling is docile and similar to the Piper Cub.

== Variants ==
5151 Mustang
Fixed gear model, with 27 examples flying by the end of 2011. This version is compliant with US light-sport aircraft rules.
5151 RG Mustang
Retractable gear model, with 83 examples flying by the end of 2011.

== Specifications (Loehle 5151 Mustang) ==
Data from Pilot Friend

General characteristics

- Crew: 1
- Length: 22 ft 10 in (6.96 m)
- Wingspan: 27 ft 5 in (8.36 m)
- Wing area: 130 sq ft (12 m^{2})
- Empty weight: 513 lb (233 kg)
- Gross weight: 885 lb (401 kg)
- Fuel capacity: 5-13 gallons
- Powerplant: 1 × Rotax 582 , 64 hp (48 kW)
- Propellers: 4-bladed wooden

Performance

- Cruise speed: 70 kn (80 mph, 130 km/h)
- Stall speed: 26 kn (30 mph, 48 km/h)
- Never exceed speed: 87 kn (100 mph, 160 km/h)
- Rate of climb: 1,200 ft/min (6.1 m/s)

== See also ==
- Bonsall DB-1 Mustang
- Stewart S-51D Mustang
- Titan T-51 Mustang
- W.A.R. P-51 Mustang
- Linn Mini Mustang
- Jurca Mustang
- FK-Lightplanes SW51 Mustang
- Papa 51 Thunder Mustang
