= Jurca Gnatsum =

Series of homebuilt replica fighter aircraft

Jurca MJ-7 Gnatsum
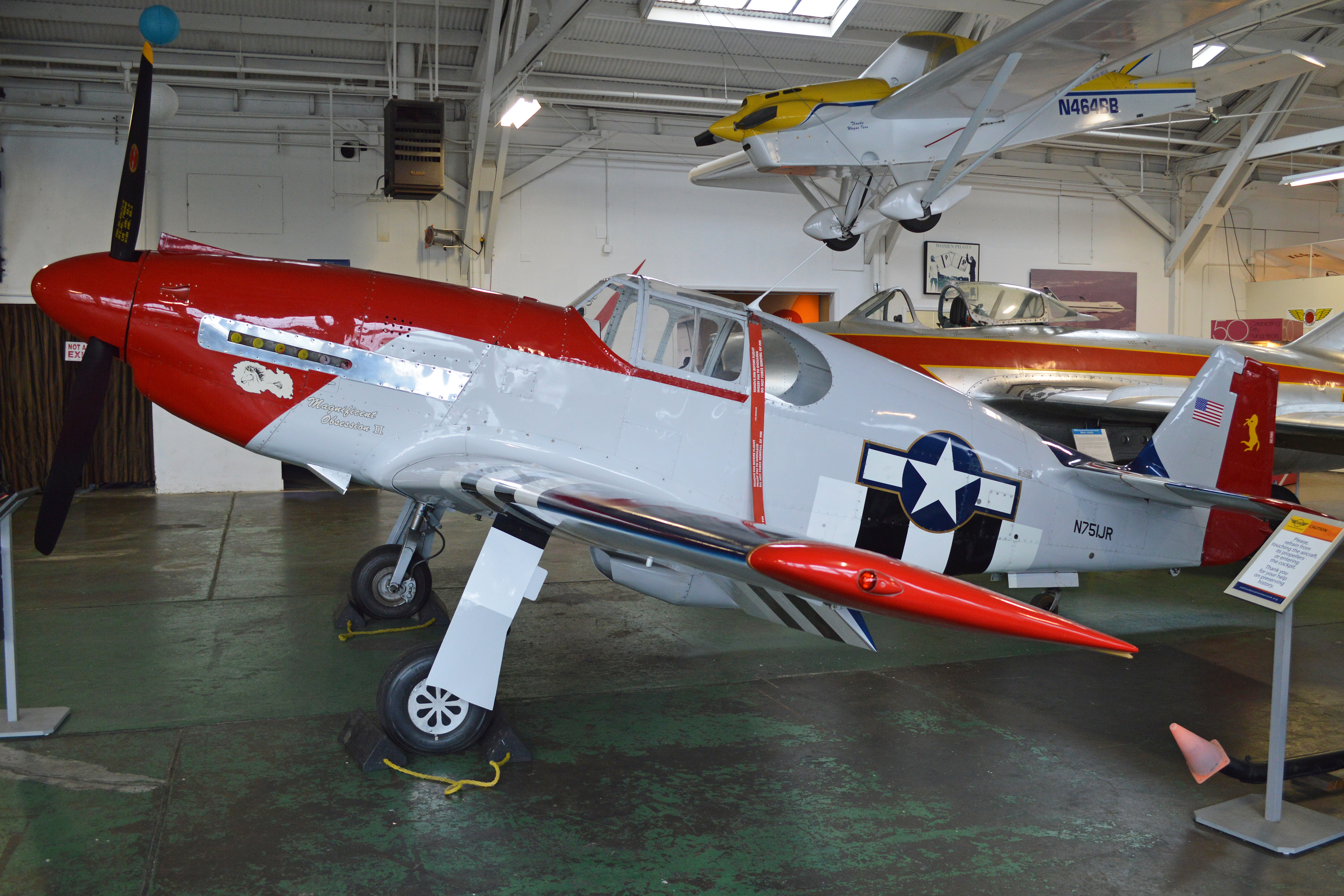

General information
- Type: Homebuilt near scale replica warbird
- National origin: France
- Designer: Marcel Jurca
- Number built: 25+

History
- First flight: 1969
- Variant: Falconar SAL Mustang

The Jurca Gnatsum is a French homebuilt near scale replica aircraft based on the North American P-51 Mustang.

== Design & Development ==
The Gnatsum (Mustang spelled backwards) is one of many wooden homebuilt designs from Romanian designer Marcel Jurca. Jurca, a Henschel Hs 129 pilot in World War II, expanded his warbird replica designs to include the Allied North American P-51 Mustang fighter.

The Gnatsum is a low-wing, cantilever monoplane with an enclosed single-seat cockpit and manually retractable tailwheel landing gear based on that of the Jurca Sirocco. Suitable for a number of engines around 200 hp (149 kW), plans for the Gnatsum are available as the 2/3 scale MJ-7 and the 3/4 scale MJ-77, as well as the MJ-70 full-size representation. All versions are constructed from wood with fabric covering, and manufacturing rights to the kit aircraft were acquired by Falconar Avia. Plans for the MJ-77 are available from Avions Marcel Jurca.

Some of the engines suitable for the MJ-7 Gnatsum series are:-

- 200 hp (149 kW) Ranger 6-440C-5 inline engine
- 125 hp (93 kW) Menasco C4
- 130 hp (97 kW) de Havilland Gipsy Major I
- 125 to 160 hp (93 to 119 kW) Rambler aluminum block in-line 6
- General Motors aluminum V-8

== Variants ==
MJ-7
2/3 scale variant
MJ-7S Solo
Single-seat advanced trainer version of MJ-7, the under-belly scoop inherited from the Mustang design was removed.
MJ-77
3/4 scale Mustang variant that requires an engine of 250 to 600 hp (186 to 447 kW).
MJ-70
Full-scale variant (still under development in 2001 when Jurca died - never completed)

== Specifications (Jurca MJ-77 Gnatsum) ==
Data from

General characteristics

- Crew: 1 Pilot
- Capacity: 1 (small) passenger
- Length: 6.53 m (21 ft 5 in)
- Wingspan: 8.43 m (27 ft 8 in)
- Wing area: 13.5 m^{2} (145 sq ft)
- Empty weight: 998 kg (2,200 lb)
- Gross weight: 1,297 kg (2,860 lb)
- Fuel capacity: 50 U.S. gallons (190 L; 42 imp gal)
- Powerplant: 1 × Geschwender , 260 kW (350 hp)
- Propellers: 4-bladed

Performance

- Maximum speed: 465 km/h (289 mph, 251 kn)
- Cruise speed: 370 km/h (230 mph, 200 kn)
- Stall speed: 105 km/h (65 mph, 56 kn)
- Range: 800 km (500 mi, 430 nmi)
- Rate of climb: 7.6 m/s (1,500 ft/min)

== See also ==
- North American Mustang

Aircraft of comparable role, configuration, and era

- Bonsall DB-1 Mustang
- FK-Lightplanes SW51 Mustang
- Linn Mini Mustang
- Papa 51 Thunder Mustang
- Stewart S-51D Mustang
- Titan T-51 Mustang
- W.A.R. P-51 Mustang
