= Flitzer Z-21 =

British homebuilt aircraft

Z-21
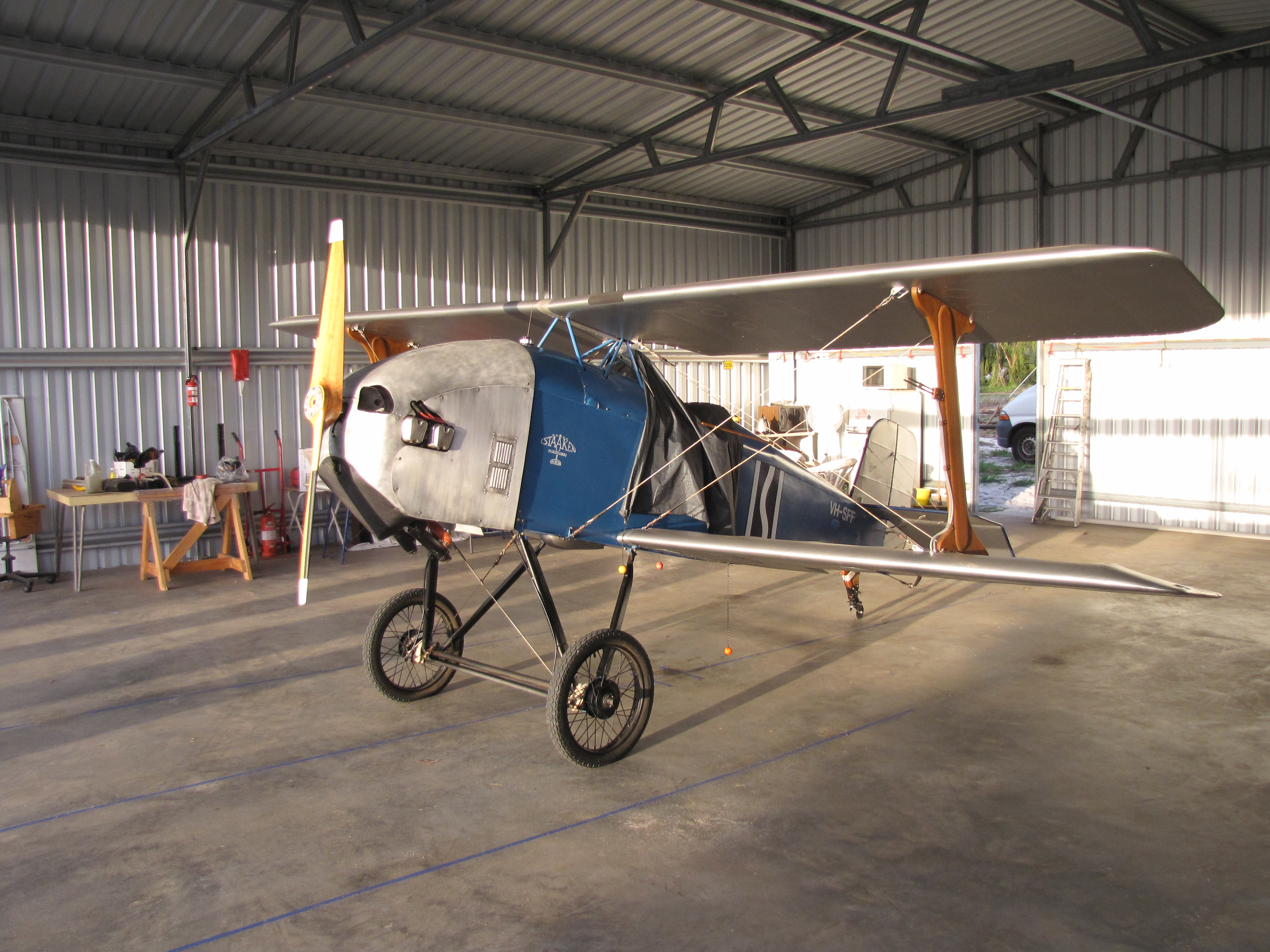

General information
- Type: Amateur-built aircraft
- National origin: United Kingdom
- Manufacturer: Flitzer Sportplanes; Bell Aeromarine
- Designer: Lynn Williams
- Status: Plans available (2012)

The Flitzer Z-21 or Staaken Flitzer is a British amateur-built aircraft, designed by Lynn Williams and produced by Flitzer Sportplanes of Aberdare, Wales. The aircraft is supplied as plans for amateur construction.

In the late 1990s, it was also marketed as plans and in kit form by Bell Aeromarine of Leicester, UK.

== Design and development ==
The Z-21 is a single-seat, open cockpit 1920s-style biplane with fixed conventional landing gear with spoked wheels and a single engine in tractor configuration.

The aircraft is made from wood, with its flying surfaces covered in doped aircraft fabric. Its 5.5 m (18.0 ft) span wing has a combined area of 9 m^{2} (97 sq ft) and ailerons on the bottom wing only. The aircraft was designed for the 65 hp (48 kW) Volkswagen air-cooled engine, but other variants have been developed that use a variety of engines, including the 110 hp (82 kW) Rotec R2800 radial engine.

Further planned developments include a tandem two seater, a four aileron version and a lighter weight version.

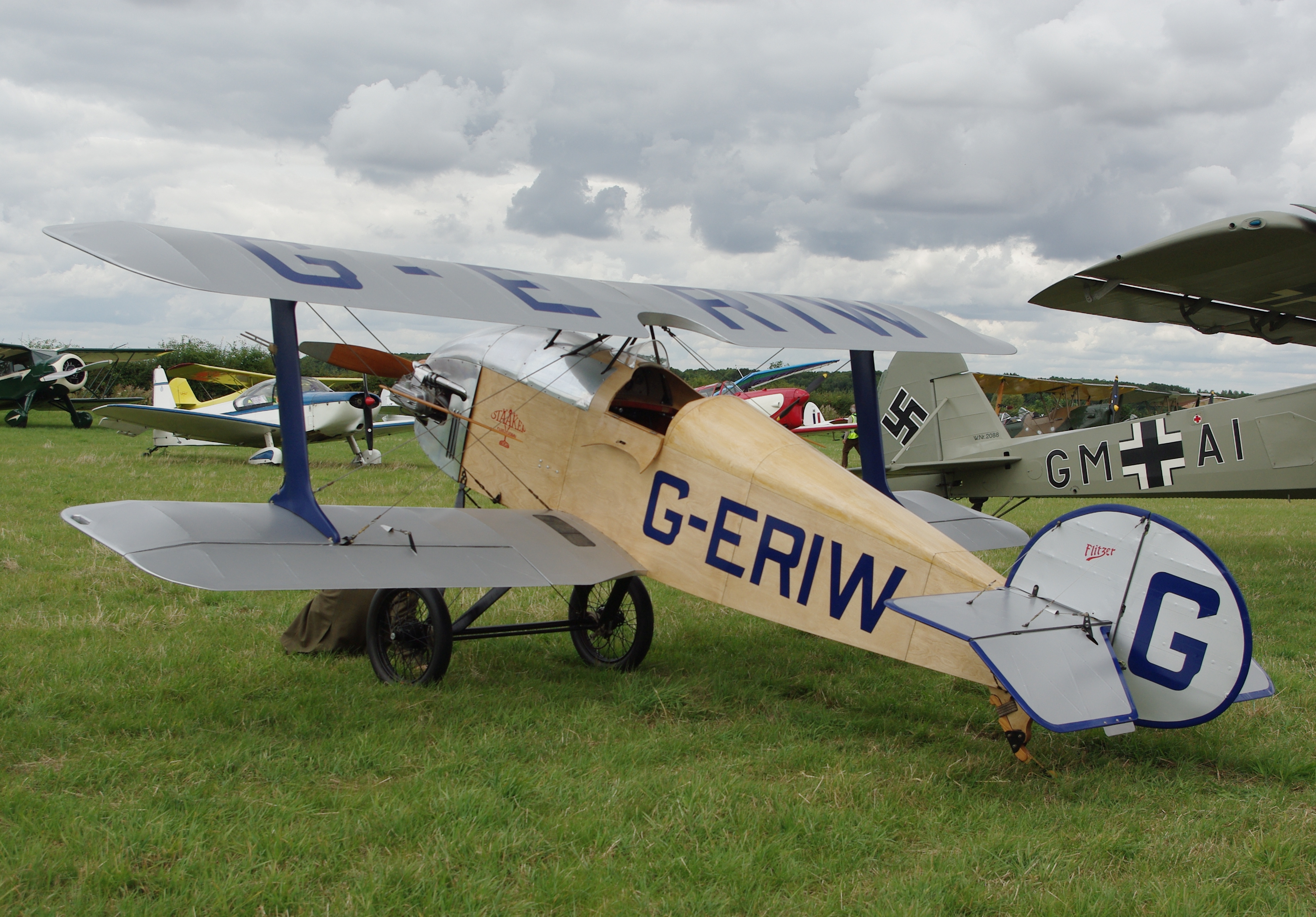

== Operational history ==
In August 2014 there were eleven Flitzers registered in the United Kingdom.

== Specifications (Z-21) ==
Data from Bayerl and Tacke

General characteristics

- Crew: one
- Wingspan: 5.5 m (18 ft 1 in)
- Wing area: 9 m^{2} (97 sq ft)
- Empty weight: 218 kg (481 lb)
- Gross weight: 341 kg (752 lb)
- Fuel capacity: 38.6 litres (8.5 imp gal; 10.2 US gal)
- Powerplant: 1 × Volkswagen air-cooled engine four cylinder, air-cooled, four stroke automotive conversion, 48 kW (65 hp)
- Propellers: 2-bladed wooden

Performance

- Maximum speed: 150 km/h (93 mph, 81 kn)
- Cruise speed: 137 km/h (85 mph, 74 kn)
- Stall speed: 67 km/h (42 mph, 36 kn)
- Rate of climb: 3.6 m/s (710 ft/min)
- Wing loading: 37.9 kg/m^{2} (7.8 lb/sq ft)
