= Falconer V-12 =

American performance racing engine

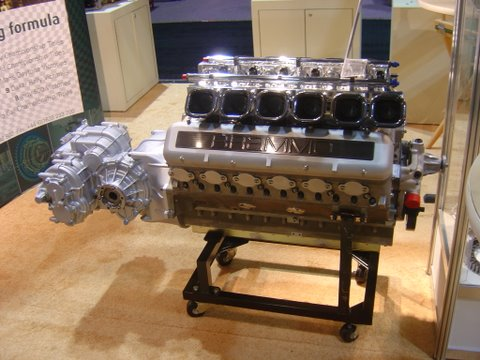
- Type: Liquid-cooled high performance V-12 piston engine
- National origin: United States
- Manufacturer: Ryan Falconer Racing Engines
- Major applications: Papa 51 Thunder Mustang, Chevrolet Corvette ZR12 (Concept)
- Developed from: Chevrolet Small-block V8

The Falconer V-12 is an American V-12 performance racing engine engineered and built by Ryan Falconer Racing Engines. The engine was first brought to market in 1990, and has roots in small block Chevrolet engines. It is available in multiple configurations for a variety of applications; primarily designed for high performance purposes including automotive, custom, racing, marine and aviation use.

The engine is built to order and has a range of available configurations in both engine volume and accessories.

== History ==
Developed in the 1980s, the engine aimed to target large-vehicle applications like boats and planes; however, the engine has seen much use in various sports cars like the Chevrolet Corvette ZR12. The engine was revealed at SEMA in 1990 where VorTech Superchargers, during their debut, gave the engine a place in their booth, which drew massive crowds. The engine is still being produced.

== Applications ==
=== Chevrolet Corvette ZR12 (Concept) ===
The Chevrolet Corvette ZR12 Concept was built to combat the Dodge Viper SR I. During development, the ZR1 matched the Viper in power, but had 8 cylinders compared to the Viper's 10. Chevrolet decided to make a concept car with 12 cylinders to compete. They sourced the Falconer V12 engine for the car because they did not have experience making anything more than a V8 with their big-block series engines. The engine bay of the ZR1 was not large enough to contain the engine, so they contracted SportsFab, based in Wixom, Michigan, to extend the engine bay by 8.8 inches. The ZR12 was complete, but it was too expensive to attract many customers and the original ZR1 was sold instead. The unique car is now at the National Corvette Museum.

=== Papa 51 Thunder Mustang ===
The P-51 Thunder Mustang was built to compete in the Reno Air Races as part of the Unlimited Class of aircraft. (Later, the aircraft was placed in Sport Class due to classification changes) The aircraft was built with the Falconer V12 because it was one of the only viable aircraft engines. Future iterations of the P-51 Thunder mustang plan on using a turbocharged version of the engine or another engine entirely.

== Specifications ==
=== General characteristics ===
- Type: 12 Cylinder Liquid Cooled V Engine
- Bore: 4.125 in (104.775 mm)
- Stroke: 3.750 in (95.25 mm)
- Displacement: 601.4 in^{3} (9.855 L)
- Length: 55.5 in (1409.7 mm)
- Width: 24.25 in (615.95 mm)
- Dry weight: 500 lb (226.8 kg)

=== Components ===
- Valvetrain: Cam-in-block operating pushrods
- Supercharger: Two Superchargers (Optional)
- Turbocharger: Four Turbochargers (Optional)
- Fuel system: MoTeC Fuel Injection
- Fuel type: 100 LL Avgas
- Oil system: Dry Sump
- Cooling system: Liquid-cooled

=== Performance ===
- Power output: 640 hp (477 kW) at 4500 rpm
- Specific power: 1.06 hp/in^{3} (48.67 kW/L)
- Compression ratio: 10.9:1
- Power-to-weight ratio: 1.28 hp/lb (2.10 kW/kg)
