= W.A.R. FW-190 =

American homebuilt warbird replica

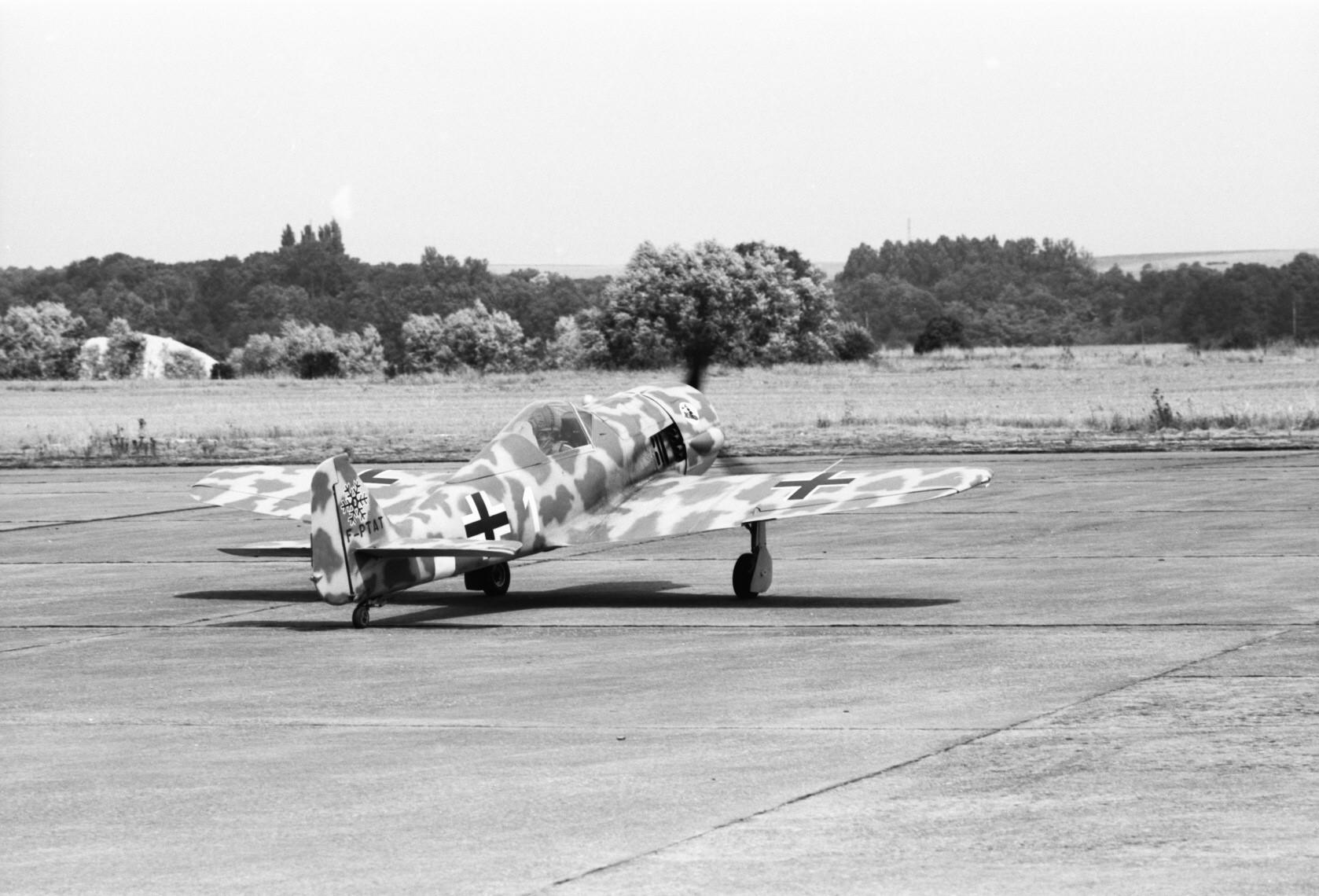

General information
- Type: Homebuilt aircraft
- National origin: United States
- Manufacturer: War Aircraft Replicas International, Inc.

History
- First flight: 21 August 1974

The W.A.R. FW-190 is a half-scale homebuilt replica of a Focke-Wulf Fw 190 fighter. In July 1973, War Aircraft Replicas International of Santa Paula, California began design of an approximately half-scale replica of the Fw 190, the first of a series of replicas of World War II aircraft using similar constructional techniques. The first prototype made its maiden flight on 21 August 1974.

== Design and development ==
The aircraft structure is based on a wooden framework for the fuselage and wings, using polyurethane foam to build up the fuselage shape and wing aerofoil profile, with a fabric/epoxy covering. The aircraft is fitted with an electrically retractable tailwheel undercarriage to match the configuration of the original aircraft. The initial powerplant specified was a 1600 cc Volkswagen air-cooled engine of 70 hp (52 kW), driving a three-bladed fixed pitch propeller. Small Continental Motors, Inc. and Lycoming Engines of 100 to 120 hp (75 to 89 kW) have commonly been used.

The prototype aircraft was displayed at the Experimental Aircraft Association convention in 1974. Realistic details such as simulated fabric surfaces, and detailed smoke trails were noted, the aircraft drew a large amount of attention at the show.

At least 197 sets of plans had been sold by 1982, and plans remain on sale from War Aircraft Replicas, now based in Florida.

== Variants ==
Some versions were built using 125 hp (93 kW) Lycoming O-235 and 123 hp (92 kW) HCI radial engines.

== Specifications (W.A.R. FW-190) ==
Data from Jane's All The World's Aircraft 1988–89

General characteristics

- Crew: 1
- Length: 16 ft 7 in (5.05 m)
- Wingspan: 20 ft 0 in (6.10 m)
- Height: 7 ft 0 in (2.13 m)
- Wing area: 70.0 sq ft (6.50 m^{2})
- Empty weight: 630 lb (286 kg)
- Max takeoff weight: 900 lb (408 kg)
- Fuel capacity: 10 US Gallons, 38 L
- Powerplant: 1 × Continental O-200 air cooled flat-four, 100 hp (75 kW)

Performance

- Maximum speed: 169 kn (194 mph, 313 km/h) at 3,500 ft (1,070 m)
- Cruise speed: 108 kn (124 mph, 200 km/h) (econ cruise)
- Stall speed: 48 kn (55 mph, 89 km/h)
- Range: 347 nmi (399 mi, 643 km)
- Service ceiling: 12,500 ft (3,800 m)
- Rate of climb: 1,000 ft/min (5.1 m/s)
- Wing loading: 12 lb/sq ft (59 kg/m^{2})
