= Airdrome Sopwith Baby =

American fighter replica

General information
- Type: Amateur-built aircraft
- National origin: United States
- Manufacturer: Airdrome Aeroplanes
- Status: In production (2011)
- Number built: 1 (2011)

History
- Developed from: Sopwith Baby

The Airdrome Sopwith Baby is an American amateur-built aircraft, designed and produced by Airdrome Aeroplanes, of Holden, Missouri. The aircraft is supplied as a kit for amateur construction.

The aircraft is a full-scale replica of the First World War British Sopwith Baby scout/bomber. The replica is built from modern materials and powered by modern engines.

== Design and development ==
The Airdrome Sopwith Baby features a strut-braced biplane layout, a single-seat open cockpit, fixed conventional landing gear with auxiliary skids and a single engine in tractor configuration.

The aircraft is made from bolted-together aluminum tubing, with its flying surfaces covered in doped aircraft fabric. The Airdrome Sopwith Baby has a wingspan of 25.5 ft (7.8 m) and a wing area of 240 sq ft (22 m^{2}). It can be equipped with engines ranging from 110 to 150 hp (82 to 112 kW). The standard engine used is the 110 hp (82 kW) four stroke Rotec R2800 radial engine. Building time from the factory-supplied kit is estimated at 450 hours by the manufacturer.

== Operational history ==
One example had been completed by December 2011.

== Specifications (Sopwith Baby) ==
Data from Kitplanes

General characteristics

- Crew: one
- Wingspan: 25.5 ft (7.8 m)
- Wing area: 240 sq ft (22 m^{2})
- Empty weight: 695 lb (315 kg)
- Gross weight: 1,095 lb (497 kg)
- Fuel capacity: 14 U.S. gallons (53 L; 12 imp gal)
- Powerplant: 1 × Rotec R2800 seven cylinder, air-cooled, four stroke radial engine, 110 hp (82 kW)
- Propellers: 2-bladed wooden

Performance

- Cruise speed: 81 mph (130 km/h, 70 kn)
- Range: 200 mi (320 km, 170 nmi)
- Rate of climb: 945 ft/min (4.80 m/s)
- Wing loading: 4.6 lb/sq ft (22 kg/m^{2})
