= W.A.R. P-51 Mustang =

American homebuilt warbird replica

General information
- Type: Homebuilt aircraft
- National origin: United States
- Manufacturer: War Aircraft Replicas International, Inc.

The W.A.R. P-51 Mustang is a 53% near-scale homebuilt replica of a North American P-51 Mustang fighter.

== Specifications (W.A.R. P-51 Mustang) ==
General characteristics

- Crew: 1
- Capacity: 1
- Empty weight: 600 lb (272 kg)
- Gross weight: 900 lb (408 kg)
- Powerplant: 1 × Hirth 3701S , 100 hp (75 kW)

Performance

- Maximum speed: 143 kn (165 mph, 266 km/h)
- Cruise speed: 117 kn (135 mph, 217 km/h)
- Stall speed: 48 kn (55 mph, 89 km/h)
- Range: 350 nmi (400 mi, 640 km)
- Wing loading: 12 lb/sq ft (59 kg/m^{2})

== See also ==
Aircraft of comparable role, configuration, and era

- FK-Lightplanes SW51 Mustang
- Jurca Gnatsum
- Linn Mini Mustang
- Loehle 5151 Mustang
- Papa 51 Thunder Mustang
- Stewart S-51D Mustang
- Titan T-51 Mustang
