= Loehle Spad XIII =

American homebuilt aircraft

Loehle SPAD XIII

General information
- Type: Ultralight aircraft
- National origin: United States
- Manufacturer: Loehle Aircraft
- Status: In production
- Number built: 16 (2011)

The Loehle SPAD XIII is an American single-seat ultralight aircraft scale replica of the First World War SPAD XIII fighter produced in kit form by Loehle Aircraft for amateur construction.

The aircraft meets the requirements of the US FAR 103 Ultralight Vehicles regulations when equipped with a lightweight engine.

== Design and development ==
The SPAD XIII is built predominantly from riveted aluminum tubing and stainless steel gussets and stamped aluminum wing ribs, all covered in doped aircraft fabric. The landing gear is of conventional configuration, with a tail skid. For scale requirements the cockpit is only 18 in (46 cm) wide.

The standard engine recommended for the design is the out-of-production 28 hp (21 kW) Rotax 277, with the also out-of-production 35 hp (26 kW) Rotax 377 as an option. Other recommended engines include the 40 hp (30 kW) Rotax 447 and 2si powerplants, both also out of production. Kit options include brakes and a long-range fuel tank.

The initial aircraft in the line is a scale replica of the First World War SPAD XIII. The same basic airframe has been developed, though the use of different rudders, wingtips, cowlings and other minor cosmetic differences, into replicas of other First World War fighter aircraft.

Reviewer Andre Cliche says about the SPAD XIII, that it "looks like a museum piece. But imagine that you can fly this museum piece and feel what the WWI pilots felt when they flew their war machines."

Reviewers Roy Beisswenger and Marino Boric wrote in a 2015 review, "the kit is very complete and builder-friendly, leaving you only the fabric covering, the paintwork and the fitting of the engine and instruments before you take off for your dawn patrol."

== Variants ==
SPAD XIII
Version as a replica of the SPAD XIII, with six flying by the end of 2011.
SE5a
Version as a replica of the SE5a, with seven flying by the end of 2011.
Fokker DVII
Version as a replica of the Fokker D.VII, with three flying by the end of 2011.

== Specifications (SPAD XIII) ==
Data from Kitplanes and Loehle

General characteristics

- Crew: one
- Length: 16 ft 5 in (5.00 m)
- Wingspan: 24 ft 0 in (7.32 m)
- Height: 6 ft 8 in (2.03 m)
- Wing area: 168 sq ft (15.6 m^{2})
- Empty weight: 250 lb (113 kg)
- Gross weight: 525 lb (238 kg)
- Fuel capacity: 5 US gallons (38 litres)
- Powerplant: 1 × Rotax 277 single-cylinder, two-stroke aircraft engine, 28 hp (21 kW)
- Propellers: 2-bladed wooden

Performance

- Maximum speed: 63 mph (101 km/h, 55 kn)
- Cruise speed: 53 mph (85 km/h, 46 kn)
- Stall speed: 20 mph (32 km/h, 17 kn)
- Never exceed speed: 85 mph (137 km/h, 74 kn)
- Range: 85 mi (137 km, 74 nmi)
- Service ceiling: 12,500 ft (3,800 m)
- g limits: +4/-2
- Rate of climb: 1,000 ft/min (5.1 m/s)
