= Loehle Aircraft =

Loehle Aircraft Corporation
- Company type: Private company
- Industry: Aerospace
- Founded: 1977
- Defunct: 2017
- Headquarters: Wartrace, Tennessee, United States
- Key people: Mike and Sandy Loehle
- Products: Kit aircraft Aircraft finishes

Loehle Aircraft Corporation (pronounced "Low-lee") was an aircraft manufacturer located in Wartrace, Tennessee, that produced aircraft kits and a complete line of paints for all types of aircraft, including metal, composite and fabric covered. It manufactured aircraft kits for 40 years, with aircraft being built and flown in 26 countries.

== History ==
This company manufactured aircraft kits from 1977 to 2017. In 1981 Mike Lohle won the Experimental Aircraft Association Oshkosh Ultralight Grand Champion Award and also the award for Outstanding Craftsmanship for his Easy Riser ultralight.

Sandra Loehle, VP of Operations and wife of founder Michael Loehle, died of cancer in 2017. The company seems to have ceased operations at that time.

== Aircraft ==
Summary of aircraft kits built by Loehle Aircraft
| Model name | First flight | Number built | Type |
|---|---|---|---|
| Loehle 5151 Mustang | 1988 | 27 fixed gear, 75 retractable gear (2007) | 3/4 scale replica of North American P-51 Mustang |
| Loehle Fokker D-VII | | 2 (2007) | Replica of Fokker D-VII |
| Loehle KW-909 | | 1 (2007) | Replica of Messerschmitt Bf 109 & Focke-Wulf Fw 190 |
| Loehle P-40 | | 3 (2007) | Replica of Curtiss P-40 |
| Loehle SE5A | | 3 (2007) | Replica of Royal Aircraft Factory S.E.5A |
| Loehle Spad XIII | | 5 (2007) | Replica of Spad XIII |
| Loehle Spitfire | | 1 (1998) | 3/4 scale replica of Supermarine Spitfire |
| Loehle Sport Parasol | | 73 (2007) | Parasol wing single seat ultralight |
