= Rotec R2800 =

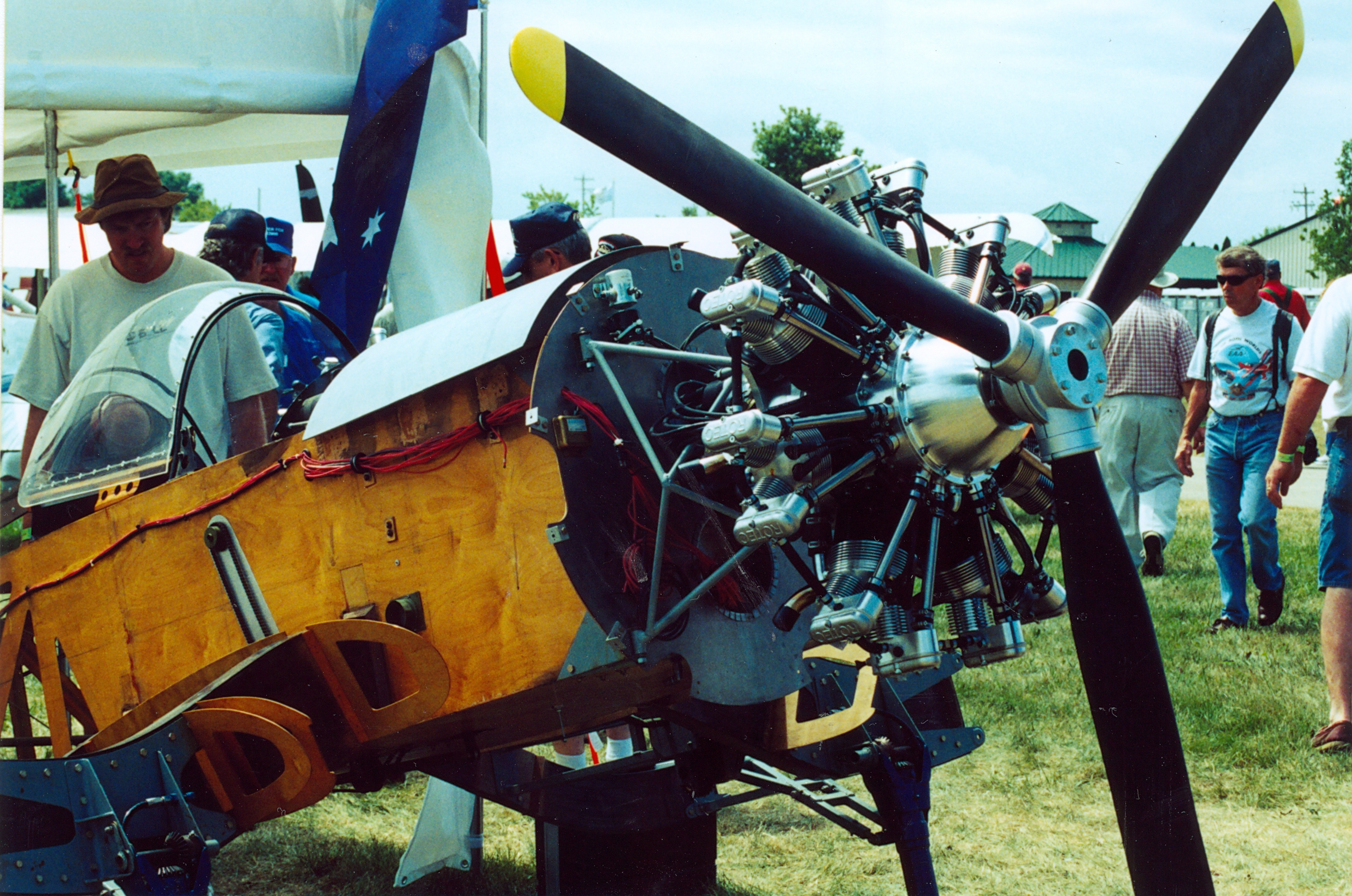
W.A.R. F4U Corsair with Rotec 2800 Engine

The Rotec R2800 is a seven-cylinder 110 hp radial engine built by Rotec Aerosport Pty Ltd in Australia. The R2800 was Rotec's first (and only) engine offering when they first opened their doors in 2000. In 2005, Rotec released a more powerful variant, the Rotec R3600 adding two more cylinders for a total of nine and increasing the rated horsepower to 150. This engine and its larger cousin are frequently used on World War I aircraft, both vintage and modern reproductions. Some notable repro WW I aircraft this engine has been used in are the Fokker Triplane, Sopwith Camel and the Nieuport 17. Other experimental / homebuilt aircraft have also been fitted with the Rotec 2800, including the Kitfox Model 7; a popular kit aircraft with over 5,000 examples of all variants completed. It is unknown how many Kitfox aircraft are equipped with the Rotec 2800 engine.

These engines are not limited to only aircraft applications as JRL Cycles has converted an R2800 for use in a motorcycle.

== Applications ==
- Aerolab LoCamp
- Aerosport Scamp
- Airdrome Nieuport 11
- Airdrome Nieuport 12
- Airdrome Nieuport 17
- Airdrome Nieuport 24
- Airdrome Nieuport 28
- Airdrome Sopwith Baby
- Airdrome Sopwith Pup
- Australian Aircraft Kits Hornet STOL
- Bee Gee Model E Sportster
- Blériot I
- Blériot XI
- Blériot XI Military
- Bristol Boxkite
- Bushbaby Explorer
- EAA Biplane
- Flitzer Z-21
- Fokker DR1
- Fokker DVIII
- Fokker EIII
- Funk Model B
- Hornet STOL
- Kitfox 4
- Kitfox 5
- Kitfox S7
- Kitfox SS
- Light Wing
- Little Looper
- Murphy Rebel
- Murphy Renegade
- Murphy Renegade Spirit
- Pietenpol Aircamper
- Piper PA-16 Clipper
- Piper J-3 Cub
- Pober Junior Ace
- Stearman PT-17
- STOLP Starduster Too
- Storch Fieseler
- Storch Criquet
- Stummelflitzer Z-1 Type R
- Stummelflitzer Z-1 Type R (A)
- Super Koala
- Warner Sportster II
- W.A.R. F4U Corsair
- Warner Revolution II
- Weller UW-9 Sprint
- Zenair CH 200
- Zenith Stol CH 701

== Specifications (Rotec R2800) ==
=== General characteristics ===
- Type: 7-cylinder Air-cooled single-row radial engine
- Bore: 3.149 in (80 mm)
- Stroke: 3.149 in (80 mm)
- Displacement: 171.8 in³ (2,800 cc)
- Diameter: 31.9 in (810 mm)
- Dry weight: 224 lb (102 kg) (dry)

=== Components ===
- Valvetrain: Poppet Valve (pushrod activated), two per cylinder.
- Supercharger: None
- Turbocharger: None
- Fuel system: Carburetion
- Fuel type: 100LL Avgas
- Oil system: Dry Sump
- Cooling system: Air Cooled

=== Performance ===
- Power output: 110 hp (82.03 kW, 111.53 PS) at 3,600 RPM Geared
- Specific power: 0.64 hp/in³ (29.19 kW/L)
- Fuel consumption: 5.81 US Gal/hr (4.84 Imp Gal/hr, 22 Liters/hr) at 75% throttle
- Power-to-weight ratio: 0.49 hp/lb (0.80 kW/kg)
