= Stewart S-51D Mustang =

American homebuilt fighter replica

S-51D Mustang
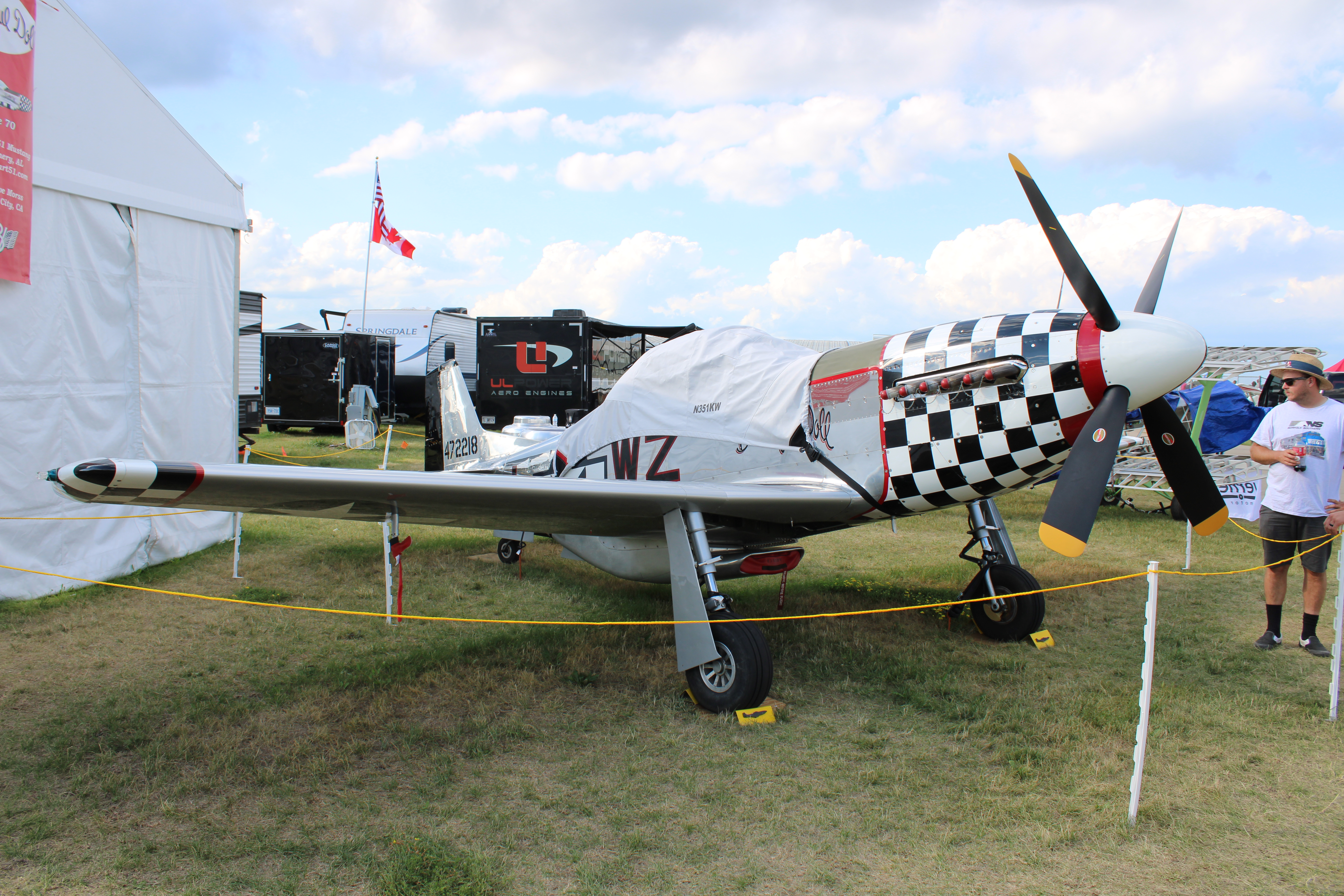

General information
- Type: Homebuilt aircraft
- National origin: United States
- Manufacturer: Stewart 51
- Designer: Jim Stewart
- Status: Production completed
- Number built: At least 19

History
- Introduction date: 1994
- First flight: 30 March 1994
- Developed from: North American P-51D Mustang

The Stewart S-51D Mustang is an American aerobatic homebuilt aircraft that was designed by Jim Stewart and produced by Stewart 51 of Vero Beach, Florida, introduced in 1994. When it was available the aircraft was supplied as a kit for amateur construction.

The S-51D is a 70% scale version of the World War II P-51D Mustang fighter aircraft.

== Design and development ==
Designer Jim Stewart took a leave of absence from his employer, Pratt & Whitney, in 1989 to work on the S-51D's tooling and design. The prototype took flight on 30 March 1994 and by late June had completed its 40 hours of test flying.

The S-51D Mustang features a cantilever low-wing, a two-seats-in-tandem enclosed cockpit under a bubble canopy, retractable conventional landing gear, and a single engine in tractor configuration.

The aircraft is made from sheet aluminum. Its 26.00 ft (7.9 m) span wing mounts flaps and has a wing area of 123.0 sq ft (11.43 m^{2}). The cabin width is 21 in (53 cm). The acceptable power range is 300 to 600 hp (224 to 447 kW). The specified propeller is a 91 in (2.31 m) diameter, constant speed four-bladed Hartzell Propeller unit, that is driven by a spur gear with a (2.13:1) reduction ratio.

The S-51D Mustang has a typical empty weight of 2,200 lb (1,000 kg) and a gross weight of 3,000 lb (1,400 kg), giving a useful load of 800 lb (360 kg). With full fuel of 70 U.S. gallons (260 L; 58 imp gal) the payload for the pilot, passenger, and baggage is 380 lb (170 kg).

The standard day, sea level, no wind, take off with a 400 hp (298 kW) engine is 1,080 ft (329 m) and the landing roll is 1,800 ft (549 m).

The manufacturer estimated the construction time from the supplied standard kit as 2000 hours. A fast-build kit was also available.

== Operational history ==
By 1998 the company reported that 72 kits had been sold and two aircraft were completed and flying.

In March 2014, 12 examples were registered in the United States with the Federal Aviation Administration, although a total of 19 had been registered at one time.

== Specifications (S-51D Mustang) ==
Data from AeroCrafter and Aircraft Spruce

General characteristics

- Crew: one
- Capacity: one passenger
- Length: 22 ft 0 in (6.71 m)
- Wingspan: 26 ft 0 in (7.92 m)
- Wing area: 123.0 sq ft (11.43 m^{2})
- Empty weight: 2,200 lb (998 kg)
- Gross weight: 3,000 lb (1,361 kg)
- Fuel capacity: 70 U.S. gallons (260 L; 58 imp gal)
- Powerplant: 1 × liquid cooled eight cylinder, four stroke engine, 400 hp (300 kW)
- Propellers: 4-bladed Hartzell Propeller constant speed propeller

Performance

- Maximum speed: 275 mph (443 km/h, 239 kn)
- Cruise speed: 260 mph (420 km/h, 230 kn)
- Stall speed: 70 mph (110 km/h, 61 kn) flaps and landing gear down
- Range: 700 mi (1,100 km, 610 nmi)
- Service ceiling: 24,000 ft (7,300 m)
- g limits: +9/-4.5 (structural)
- Rate of climb: 2,780 ft/min (14.1 m/s)
- Wing loading: 24.4 lb/sq ft (119 kg/m^{2})

== See also ==
- Cameron P-51G
- Jurca Gnatsum
- Loehle 5151 Mustang
- Papa 51 Thunder Mustang
- ScaleWings SW51 Mustang
- W.A.R. P-51 Mustang
- List of aerobatic aircraft
