= ScaleWings SW51 Mustang =

Austrian ultralight aircraft

SW51 Mustang
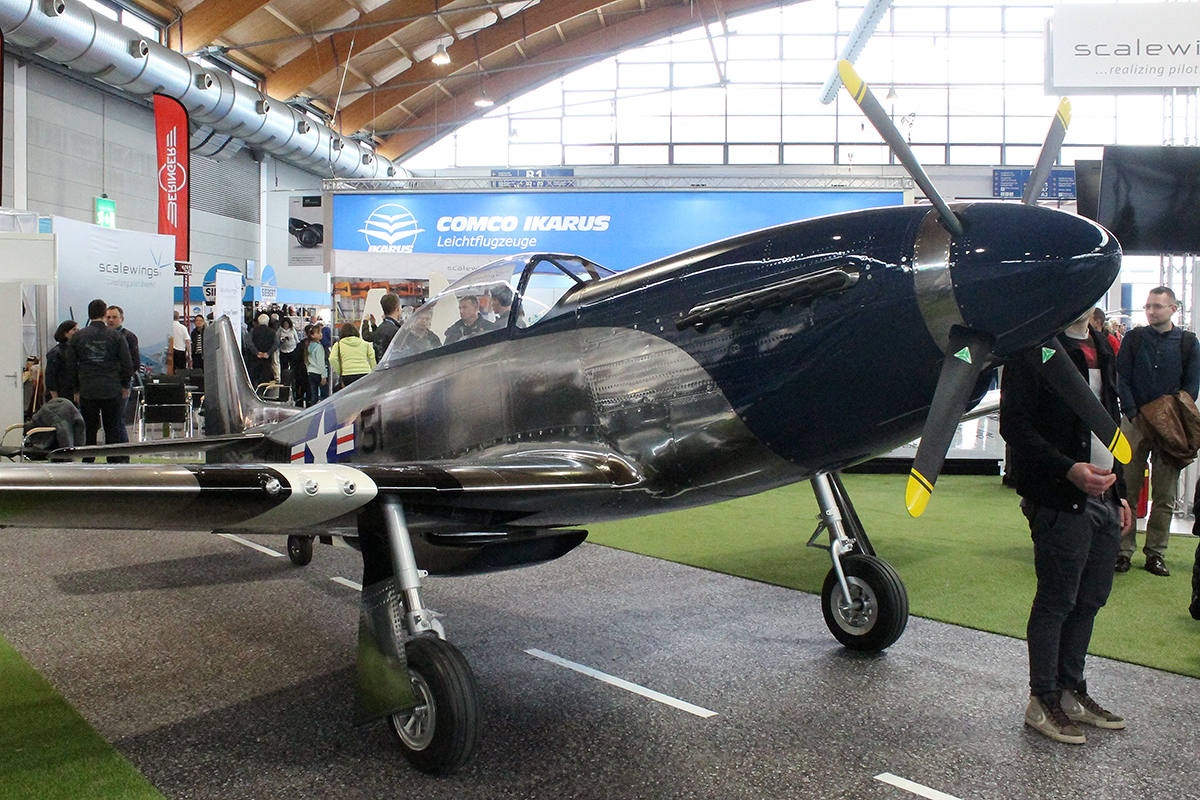

General information
- Type: Ultralight aircraft
- National origin: Austria
- Manufacturer: FK-Lightplanes; ScaleWings
- Status: In production (2017)

History
- Introduction date: 2013
- First flight: October 2014
- Developed from: North American P-51 Mustang

The ScaleWings SW51 Mustang, formerly marketed as the FK-Lightplanes FK51 Mustang, is an Austrian ultralight, light-sport aircraft and homebuilt aircraft that was designed by ScaleWings of Strasswalchen, Austria and was initially produced by FK-Lightplanes of Krosno, Poland, who introduced it publicly at the AERO Friedrichshafen show in 2013. After FK-Lightplanes ceased production, the design was built by ScaleWings.

The aircraft was first flown in October 2014 and is supplied as a complete ready-to-fly-aircraft or as a kit for amateur construction.

The SW51 is a 70% replica of the North American P-51 Mustang fighter aircraft of the Second World War.

== Design and development ==
Similar to the P-51 Mustang that it is based upon, the SW51 features a cantilever low-wing, a two-seats in tandem enclosed cockpit under a bubble canopy, fixed or retractable conventional landing gear and a single engine in tractor configuration. The light-sport version for the US market will have fixed landing gear as that category requires.

The design's structure is made from carbon fibre. Its 7.9 m (25.9 ft) span wing mounts flaps. The Mustang features electro-hydraulic retractable landing gear, hydraulic disc brakes on the main wheels, dual controls and electrically-operated flaps. It also has three-axis fly-by-wire trim tabs, electrically-adjustable rudder pedals, two internally-mounted 58 litres (13 imp gal; 15 US gal) Kevlar/carbon fibre fuel tanks and detachable outer wing panels. The design includes two baggage compartments, one in front of the firewall and one behind the cockpit. The manufacturer has made the aircraft as similar to the original as possible, down to the simulated metal finish, rivets and other details. It also includes a 2000 watt sound system that provides a Rolls-Royce Merlin engine sound and a smoke generator for start-up smoke simulation.

Unlike the P-51 Mustang, the SW51's bubble canopy can slide aft and then is hinged to the right for egress.

The initial FK-Lightplanes model was a European microlight version. When production passed to ScaleWings they developed new models of the design, including a light-sport model, a homebuilt model that is also available ready-to-fly for the US Experimental-Exhibition category and a heavier weight ultralight version.

== Operational history ==
In a 2023 review for AVweb, Kitplanes Editor-at-Large, Paul Dye wrote, "What makes this latest entry in the Mustang look-alike contest special? Its carbon-fiber construction is a place to start. Making composite structural parts in female molds allows a surface finish that simulates every rivet and screw in the original Mustang. Painted properly, it is hard to tell that you aren’t looking at an aluminum airplane unless you knock on the structure and hear the difference. Remarkably, the molds for the SW-51 have every surface feature made into the mold individually with meticulous care, or so we’re told. When you look at the finished product, it shows flush rivets and screws that appear to have typical paint buildup in the dimples and in the heads of the Phillips screws. The simulation is remarkable. Even the rudder looks as if it is fabric covered, with rib stitching and pinked tapes—the whole nine yards. Just like a real Mustang."

== Variants ==
FK51
Initial model produced by FK-Lightplanes for the European microlight category with a typical empty weight of 288 kg (635 lb) and a gross weight of 472.5 kg (1,042 lb), giving a useful load of 184.5 kg (407 lb). With full fuel of 115 litres (25 imp gal; 30 US gal) the payload for pilot, passenger and baggage is 102 kg (225 lb). The acceptable power range is 100 to 115 hp (75 to 86 kW) and the standard engines used are the 100 hp (75 kW) Rotax 912S or 912iS and the turbocharged 115 hp (86 kW) Rotax 914 powerplant.
SW51 Ultralight
A proposed model by ScaleWings for when the European microlight category has its gross weight raised to 600 kg (1,300 lb) to match the US light-sport rules. It will have a typical empty weight of 340 kg (750 lb) and a gross weight of 600 kg (1,300 lb). The maximum power will be 250 hp (186 kW).
SW51 S-LSA
A model by ScaleWings for the US light-sport rules, with fixed landing gear and a fixed pitch propeller. It has a typical empty weight of 340 kg (750 lb) and a gross weight of 600 kg (1,300 lb). The maximum power is 100 hp (75 kW).
SW51 Experimental
A model by ScaleWings for US Experimental Amateur-built or Experimental-Exhibition rules as a quick-build kit or fully assembled. It has a typical empty weight of 400 to 650 kg (880 to 1,430 lb), depending on the engine installed and a gross weight of 1,000 kg (2,200 lb). The maximum power is 600 hp (447 kW).

== Specifications (FK51 ultralight) ==
Data from AVweb and the manufacturer

General characteristics

- Crew: one
- Capacity: one pilot
- Length: 6.880 m (22 ft 7 in)
- Wingspan: 7.900 m (25 ft 11 in)
- Height: 1.970 m (6 ft 6 in)
- Empty weight: 288 kg (635 lb)
- Gross weight: 472.5 kg (1,042 lb)
- Fuel capacity: 115 litres (25 imp gal; 30 US gal)useable
- Powerplant: 1 × Rotax 912 four cylinder, air and liquid-cooled, four stroke aircraft engine, 75 kW (100 hp)
- Propellers: 3-bladed DUC Hélices carbon fiber CS fixed-pitch propeller or 4-blade variable-pitch propeller

Performance

- Cruise speed: 280 km/h (170 mph, 150 kn) at 75% power
- Stall speed: 65 km/h (40 mph, 35 kn)
- Never exceed speed: 370 km/h (230 mph, 200 kn)
- Range: 1,700 km (1,000 mi, 900 nmi)
- g limits: +8/-4 g (at 600 kg)
