= Parker Teenie Two =

Teenie Two
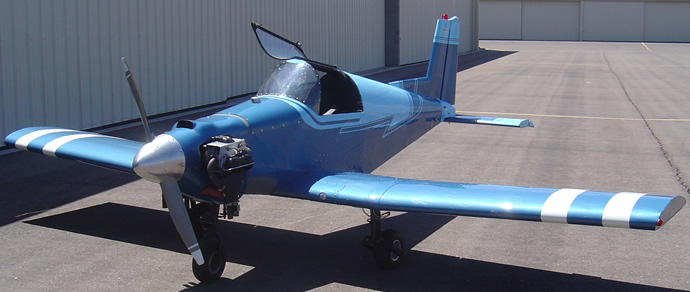

General information
- Type: Sport aircraft
- National origin: United States
- Manufacturer: Homebuilt
- Designer: Calvin Y. Parker

History
- First flight: 1969

The Parker Teenie Two is a single-seat, single-engine sport aircraft first built in the United States in 1969 and marketed for homebuilding. It is a low-wing, cantilever monoplane of conventional configuration and fixed tricycle undercarriage. The cockpit was designed to be left open, but plans for a canopy to enclose it were made available, the use of which would increase the top speed of the aircraft. The Teenie Two was specifically designed to use a converted Volkswagen automobile engine for power. The outer wing panels can be detached for transport or storage.

It was featured on the cover of a Popular Mechanics magazine issue in May, 1971. The caption on the cover read, "Build a VW-Powered Plane for $750."

The Teenie Two may be certified in the Experimental category in the US. A pilot certificate is required to fly it, as it is not considered an ultralight aircraft in the United States. The airplane does however meet the Light Sport Aircraft requirements as defined by the FAA

== Development ==
Drawing from the experience with his previous design, the Jeanie's Teenie, Calvin Parker set out to refine the popular airplane. Improvements on the Jeanie's Teenie included adoption of a fixed horizontal stabilizer, over the all flying tail of the former machine. The aft fuselage was smoothed to follow a straight line from the cockpit to the tail, an aesthetic change that replaced the older plane's bent back appearance. Fuel capacity was increased as was horsepower, resulting in a heavier but faster airplane. Brakes were added as a requirement, as the lighter Jeanie's Teenie could get by without them. The end product was a smoother, streamlined appearance and better handling. The new airplane was named Teenie Two.

== Design ==
Teenie Two was conceived as an airplane that could be built using only hand tools, things that would be possessed by the average person in the early 1970s. The philosophy was Keep It Simple. It was intended to be within reach of someone with no previous experience in building an airplane, or in metal work. To this end, the parts are laid out in such a way that they do not require complex jigs or frames of any kind. The materials were also selected because they could be obtained at a typical hardware store of the day.

Power is derived from the ubiquitous air-cooled Volkswagen automobile engine with modifications laid out by the designer in the plans.

The fuselage is a monocoque design. The empennage consists of a single vertical tail with a hinged rudder. The horizontal stabilizer is fixed, an improvement over Parker's earlier design, the Jeanie's Teenie. A hinged elevator is attached to the horizontal tail.

The wings are a fully cantilevered design. The outer wing panels, 6 feet in length each, are detachable to facilitate ground transportation. To simplify construction, each wing rib is a single piece and slides onto the main spar, a technique that helps in rib alignment. The main spar utilizes a special channel that allows the outer wings to flex and minimizes the amount of material required for bracing. The Teenie Two is not equipped with flaps.

The landing gear is tubular steel, with automotive valve springs and rubber hose inside, for shock absorption. The landing gear is a fixed tricycle configuration with nose wheel steering through rudder bar deflection. The main gear is designed to fail in the event of excessive stress, thus preventing damage to the wing structure. The wing center section design, makes up part of the main landing gear attachment. The tricycle configuration also eases ground handling.

The cockpit is ideally minimal, equipped with instrumentation for simple, day, VFR flying. Aileron and elevator control is affected through use of a side stick. This makes ingress/egress of the tight cockpit simpler and prevents leg movements from imparting motion to the stick inflight. Rudder control is by use of a rudder bar rather than individual pedals, thus reducing complexity. Flight controls are attached and actuated with push rods rather than cables.

New designs have the luxury of materials and tools that did not exist or were not readily available to the builders of the 1970s. In principle it is possible to refine older methods, and utilize more diverse materials in construction but the Teenie Two is meant to be built as a minimal airplane, with minimal tools, complexity, skillset, and expense.

The Teenie Two is constructed primarily of aluminum, with stainless steel and steel making up the balance. Parts are made from sheet, angle, and tubular stock. The aluminum sheet and extruded angles are limited to two required thicknesses, thus simplifying purchases. Components are fastened using steel mandrel blind rivets of various length. The sheet metal is formed over wooden templates traced from the full sized plans. Very little welding is required, and is generally limited to the landing gear, motor mounts, and small control linkages. The airplane is small enough that it can be built in a garage, on a large table. The aircraft can be built in around 300 hours.

The flight characteristics of the design were intended to be quick but not oversensitive, for mild aerobatics and handling in rough air. The side stick controller also necessitated full control authority by wrist movement alone. With a fuel capacity of 9 gallons and a typical cruise power setting, the Teenie Two has an endurance of nearly 3 1/2 hours.

== Variants ==
Teenie Two
original single-seat version
Double Teenie
Two-seat version

The Teenie Two design was the inspiration for another airplane designed by Gary Watson, called the Watson Windwagon. A redesign of the Watson Windwagon by Morry Hummel, led to the popular Hummelbird airplane. A closer derivative of the Teenie Two optimized for aerobatics, was developed by Bradley Aerospace and called the Bradley Aerobat.

== Specifications ==
Data from Jane's All the World's Aircraft 1985–86, p.602 Air Trails 1971

General characteristics

- Crew: One pilot
- Length: 12 ft 10 in (3.91 m)
- Wingspan: 18 ft 0 in (5.49 m)
- Empty weight: 310 lb (140 kg)
- Gross weight: 590 lb (267 kg)
- Powerplant: 1 × converted Volkswagen air-cooled engine , 42 hp (32 kW)

Performance

- Maximum speed: 120 mph (193 km/h, 100 kn)
- Cruise speed: 110 mph (180 km/h, 96 kn)
- Range: 400 mi (640 km, 350 nmi)
- Service ceiling: 15,000 ft (4,600 m)
- Rate of climb: 1,000 ft/min (5.1 m/s)

== See also ==
Aircraft of comparable role, configuration, and era

- BK Fliers BK-1
- Corby Starlet
- Hummel Bird
- Hummel Ultracruiser
- Sonex Aircraft Onex
- Thatcher CX4
- Watson GW-1 Windwagon
