= Parker Jeanie's Teenie =

American homebuilt aircraft

Jeanie's Teenie

General information
- Type: Sport aircraft
- National origin: United States
- Manufacturer: Homebuilt
- Designer: Calvin Y. Parker

History
- First flight: 1967
- Variant: Teenie Two

The Parker Jeanie's Teenie, or JT-1, is a single-seat, single-engine sport aircraft first built in the United States in 1967 and marketed for homebuilding. It was featured on the cover of a Popular Mechanics magazine issue in May, 1968. The caption on the cover read, "Build This 'Flying Volkswagen' For Less Than $600!." The cost of materials has increased since the article's publication but the initial popularity of Parker's Jeanie's Teenie was high. The Teenie would be certified in the Experimental category in the US. A pilot license is required to fly one, as it is not considered an ultralight aircraft in the United States.[6]

== Development ==
Calvin Parker developed the first prototype Jeanie's Teenie in Daphne, Alabama. He was not an aeronautical engineer but while working for a large US aircraft manufacturer, enlisted the help of an aircraft engineer. The goal was to provide the average person with a metal aircraft design that could be built using common tools. An engineering study produced the requirements for a safe minimal design that Parker then doubled to ensure durability. The prototype was named after his daughter Jeanie, who helped Parker during the development process.[2]

== Design ==
Jeanie's Teenie was conceived as an airplane that could be built using only hand tools that would be possessed by the average person in the late 1960s. It was intended to be within reach of someone with no previous experience in building an airplane, or in metal work. To this end, the parts were laid out in such a way that they did not require complex jigs or frames of any kind. The materials were also selected because they could be obtained at a typical hardware store of the day. The sheet metal called for in the design was 2024-T3, in .020 and .040 inch thicknesses.[2]

Power is derived from a Volkswagen air-cooled engine with modifications laid out by the designer in the plans.[2]

The fuselage is a monocoque design. The outer wings are detachable to facilitate transportation to an airport. To simplify construction, each wing rib is a single piece and slides onto the main spar. This technique helps in rib alignment. The main spar utilizes a special channel that allows the outer wings to flex and minimizes the amount of material required to brace the wings. Additionally, the airplane is not equipped with flaps. The tail features an all flying tailplane, or stabilator.[2]

The landing gear is tubular steel with springs for shock absorption. The landing gear is a fixed tricycle configuration with nose wheel steering through rudder bar deflection. The main gear is designed to fail in the event of excessive stress, thus preventing damage to the wing structure. The tricycle configuration also eases handling.

The cockpit is minimal, equipped with instrumentation for day, VFR flying. Aileron and elevator control is affected through use of a side stick. This makes ingress/egress of the tight cockpit simpler and prevents leg movements from imparting motion to the stick inflight. Rudder control is actuated by the use of a rudder bar rather than individual pedals, thus reducing complexity.[2]

The Jeanie's Teenie is constructed primarily of aluminum, with stainless steel and steel making up the balance. Parts are made from sheet, angle, and tubular stock. The aluminum sheet and extruded angles are limited to two required thicknesses, thus simplifying purchases. Components are fastened using steel mandrel blind rivets of various length. The sheet metal is formed over wooden templates traced from the full sized plans. Very little welding is required, and is generally limited to the landing gear, motor mounts, and small control linkages. The airplane is small enough that it can be built in a garage, on a large table.

The flight characteristics of the design were intended to be quick but not oversensitive, for mild aerobatics and handling in rough air. The side stick controller also necessitated full control authority by wrist movement alone. With a fuel capacity of seven gallons and a typical cruise power setting, the Jeanie's Teenie has an endurance of nearly three hours. The Jeanie's Teenie had a reputation for being quick on the controls. The stabilator design gave the airplane a great deal of pitch sensitivity. The scale of the airplane requires careful attention to weight and balance. As the plane was intended for simple, cheap VFR flying, builders should resist the urge to install extraneous equipment or features that would increase the weight of the vehicle. It is a design that benefits greatly from frugality and minimalism. Deviation from the plans may significantly alter the flight characteristics of the airplane and present a safety hazard.

Plans for the Jeanie's Teenie were available through Popular Mechanics Magazine.

== Variants ==
Teenie Two
The Jeanie's Teenie design was eventually improved upon by the designer, Calvin Parker, and became known as the Teenie Two. The Teenie Two design became the inspiration for another airplane designed by Gary Watson, called the Watson Windwagon. A redesign of the Watson Windwagon by Morry Hummel, led to the popular Hummelbird airplane. A closer derivative of the Teenie Two optimized for aerobatics, was developed by Bradley Aerospace and called the Bradley Aerobat.
Bandito
A highly modified enclosed canopy variant built by Bert Matzke and Clarance Brueggeman.

== Specifications ==
Data from Popular Mechanics, May 1968., Brown, Kevin p.120

General characteristics

- Crew: One pilot
- Length: 11 ft 11 in (3.63 m)
- Wingspan: 18 ft 0 in (5.49 m)
- Wing area: 54 sq ft (5.0 m^{2})
- Empty weight: 285 lb (130 kg)
- Gross weight: 550 lb (250 kg)
- Powerplant: 1 × converted Volkswagen air-cooled engine , 36 hp (28 kW)

Performance

- Maximum speed: 85 mph (136 km/h, 74 kn)
- Endurance: 3 hours
- Rate of climb: 1,000 ft/min (5.1 m/s)

== See also ==
Aircraft of comparable role, configuration, and era

- Parker Teenie Two
- Corby Starlet
- Hummel Bird
- Thatcher CX-4
- Druine Turbulent
