= Himat =

Himat may refer to:

- Bradley BA-300 Himat, a proposed American aircraft design
- Rockwell HiMAT, an experimental American aircraft design
