= Clapp's Cars Spyder Standard =

Standard
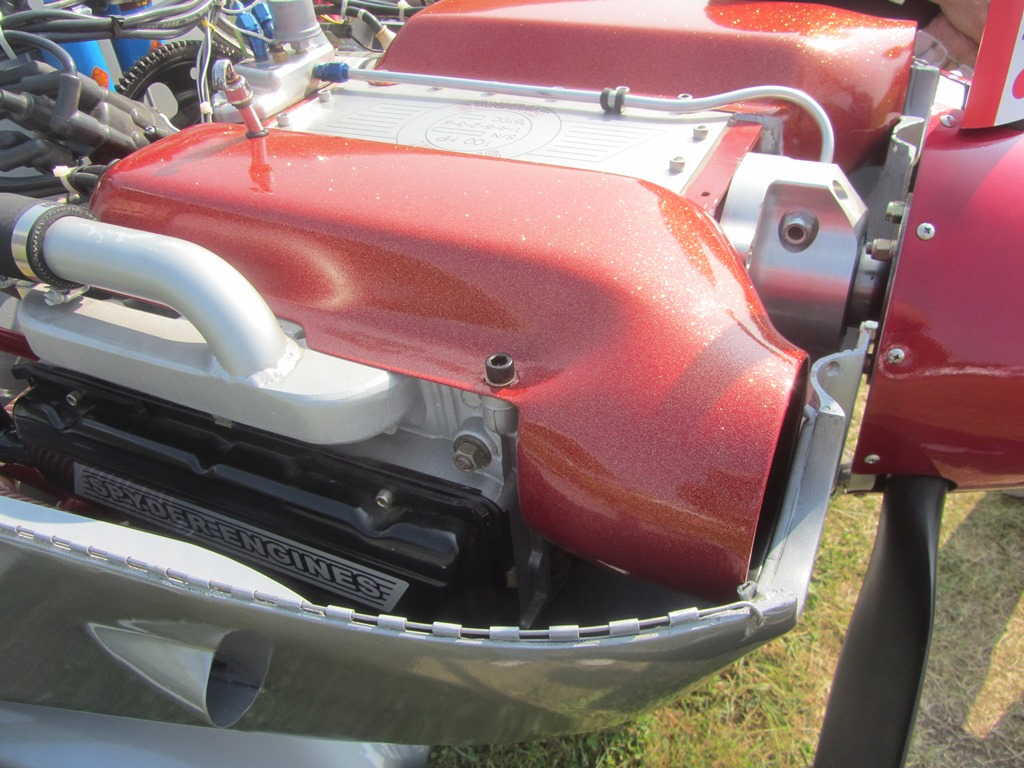
- Standard mounted on homebuilt aircraft
- Type: Horizontally opposed piston engine
- National origin: United States
- Manufacturer: Clapp's cars
- Designer: Clapp
- Major applications: Experimental Aircraft
- Developed from: Chevrolet Corvair

The Standard is a 4 stroke aircraft engine for homebuilt aircraft.

== Design and development ==
The engine is based on the Corvair engine. It is extensively modified for aircraft use. This modification consists of an IFB Internal front bearing modification to take forward loads.

== Applications ==
- Sonex Aircraft Sonex

== Specifications (variant) ==
=== General characteristics ===
- Displacement: 170 cu in (2.79 L)

=== Performance ===
- Power output: 100 hp (75 kW)
- Compression ratio: 8:1

== See also ==
Related development

- Revmaster R-2300
