= BK Fliers BK-1 =

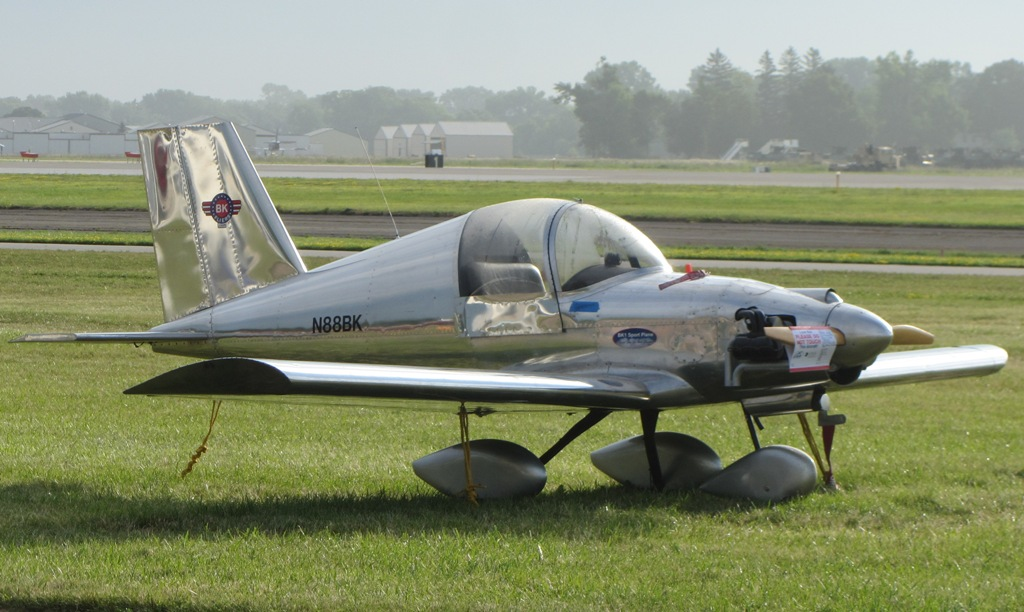

General information
- Type: Homebuilt aircraft
- Manufacturer: BK Fliers
- Designer: Bruce King

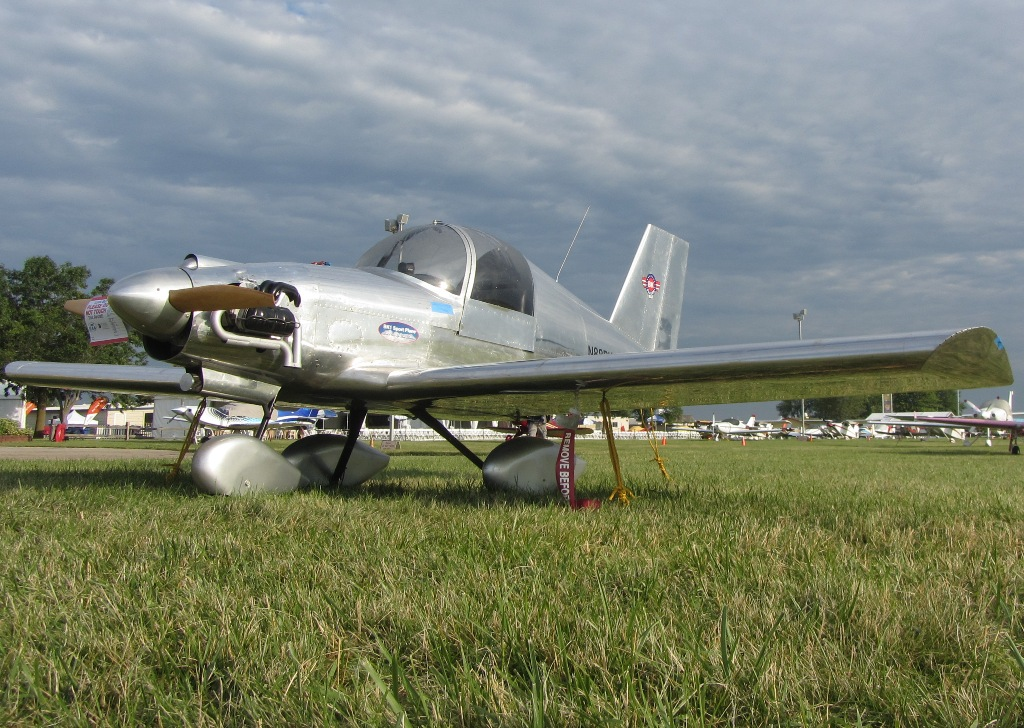
BK-1.3: The second aircraft built by the designer with tricycle gear at EAA's AirVenture 2013, Oshkosh, Wisconsin

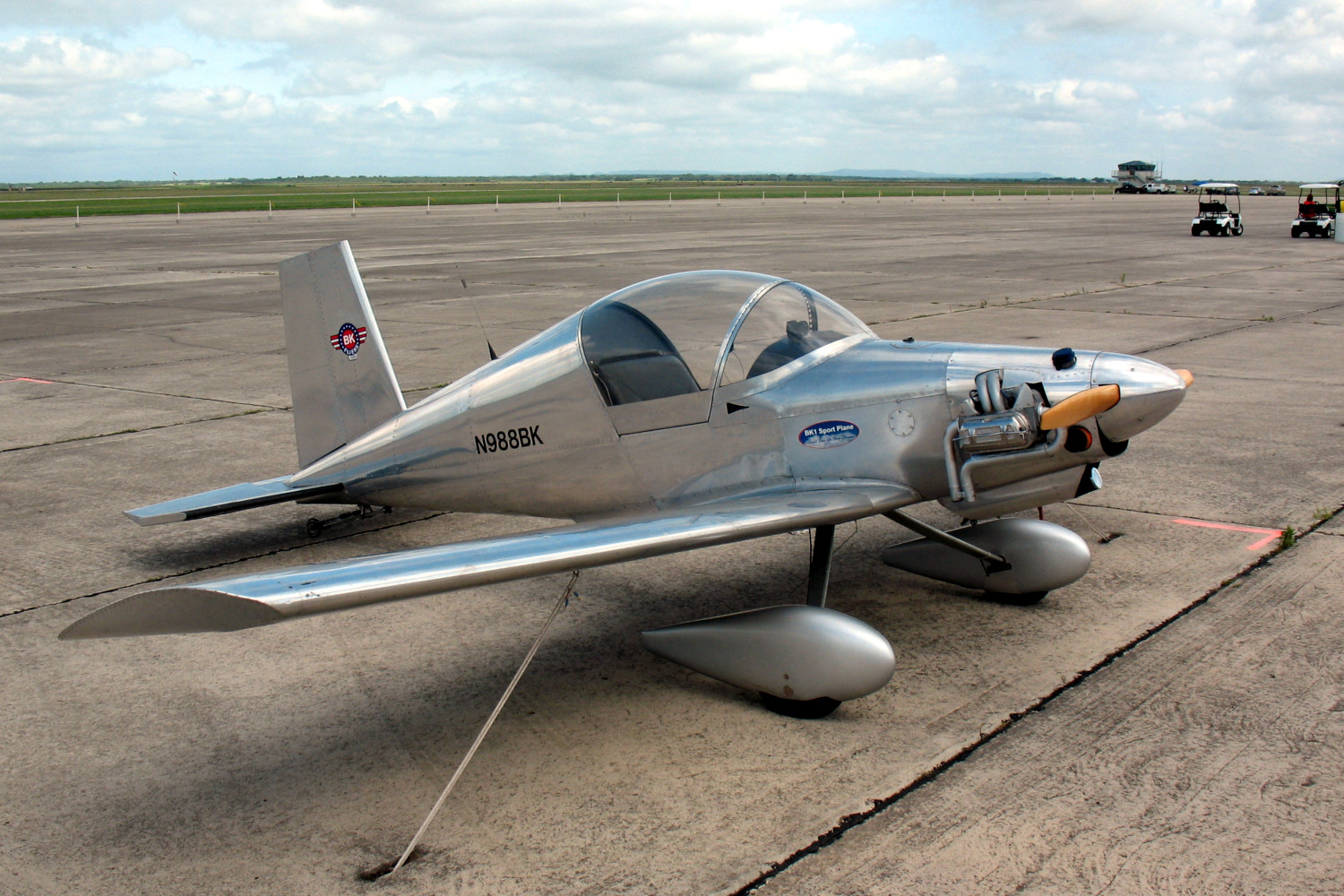
The original BK Flyer at the Southwest Regional Fly-In, Hondo, Texas. June 1, 2007

The BK Fliers BK-1 is a single seat homebuilt aircraft.

== Design and development ==
The Bk-1 was designed and built by Bruce King in 2004 after building a modified Hummel Bird. It was patterned after the Hummel Bird, with a full VW engine and larger cockpit and surfaces.

The BK-1 is an all-aluminum, monocoque/semi-monocoque, single-engine, low-wing airplane, with either conventional or tricycle landing gear. The BK-1.3 is a modified version, 30% larger than the original, with full-span flaperons.

== Variants ==
- BK-1: Original version, originally with conventional landing gear
- BK-1.3: 30%-larger version, originally with tricycle gear

== Specifications (BK-1) ==
Data from Manufacturer

General characteristics

- Crew: 1
- Length: 15 ft 4 in (4.67 m)
- Wingspan: 19 ft 4 in (5.89 m)
- Height: 6 ft 5 in (1.96 m)
- Empty weight: 450 lb (204 kg)
- Gross weight: 850 lb (386 kg)
- Fuel capacity: 15 U.S. gallons (57 L; 12 imp gal)
- Powerplant: 1 × VW Great Plains Aircraft Supply Company Volkswagen air-cooled engine, 60 hp (45 kW)

Performance

- Maximum speed: 126 kn (145 mph, 233 km/h)
- Cruise speed: 110 kn (130 mph, 210 km/h)
- Stall speed: 38 kn (44 mph, 71 km/h) Flaperons deployed
- Rate of climb: 750 ft/min (3.8 m/s)

== See also ==
Aircraft of comparable role, configuration, and era

- Parker Jeanie's Teenie
- Sonex Aircraft Onex
- Hummel Bird
- Thatcher CX4
