= CX5 =

CX-5 or CX5 may refer to:

- Mazda CX-5, a compact crossover SUV produced by Mazda
- Thatcher CX5, an American homebuilt aircraft
- CX5, identifier for Cannabinoid receptor type 2, a G protein-coupled receptor from the cannabinoid receptor family
- (6724) 1991 CX5, a main-belt minor planet
- CX5 Division, a division of the Canadian Xtreme Paintball League

== See also ==
- Yamaha CX5M, an MSX-compatible computer made by Yamaha
