= Bradley BA-200 ATAC =

American homebuilt airplane

BA-200 ATAC

General information
- Type: Homebuilt aircraft
- National origin: United States
- Manufacturer: Bradley Aerospace
- Status: Production completed
- Number built: One

The Bradley BA-200 ATAC (or Bradley ATAC BA-200) was an American homebuilt aircraft that was designed by Bradley Aerospace of Chico, California, introduced in the mid-1990s. The aircraft was intended to be supplied as a kit for amateur construction, but is likely that only one was constructed.

== Design and development ==
The BA-200 was conceived as a follow-on design to the Bradley Aerobat. It was intended to feature two-seats-in-tandem and aerobatic capabilities that included an airframe stressed to +/-15g.

The aircraft was made from all-metal construction. Its 18.4 ft (5.6 m) span wing had a wing area of 110 sq ft (10 m^{2}). The cabin width was 22 in (56 cm). The acceptable power range was 98 to 150 hp (73 to 112 kW) and the standard engine used was the 98 hp (73 kW) Volkswagen air-cooled engine .

The aircraft had a typical empty weight of 450 lb (200 kg) and a gross weight of 1,000 lb (450 kg), giving a useful load of 550 lb (250 kg). With full fuel of 20 U.S. gallons (76 L; 17 imp gal) the payload for the pilot, passenger and baggage was 430 lb (200 kg).

The standard day, sea level, no wind, take off with a 98 hp (73 kW) engine was 300 ft (91 m) and the landing roll was 400 ft (122 m).

The manufacturer estimated the construction time from the supplied kit as 200 hours.

== Operational history ==
By 1998 the company reported that one aircraft had been completed and was flying.

In April 2015 no examples were registered in the United States with the Federal Aviation Administration and it is unlikely that any exist any more.

== Specifications (BA-200) ==
Data from AeroCrafter

General characteristics

- Crew: one
- Capacity: one passenger
- Length: 20.0 ft (6.1 m)
- Wingspan: 18.4 ft (5.6 m)
- Wing area: 110 sq ft (10 m^{2})
- Aspect ratio: 3.1:1
- Empty weight: 450 lb (204 kg)
- Gross weight: 1,000 lb (454 kg)
- Fuel capacity: 20 U.S. gallons (76 L; 17 imp gal)
- Powerplant: 1 × Volkswagen air-cooled engine four cylinder, air-cooled, four stroke automotive conversion engine, 98 hp (73 kW)
- Propellers: 2-bladed wooden, fixed pitch

Performance

- Maximum speed: 280 mph (450 km/h, 240 kn)
- Cruise speed: 200 mph (320 km/h, 170 kn)
- Stall speed: 50 mph (80 km/h, 43 kn)
- Range: 1,000 mi (1,600 km, 870 nmi)
- Service ceiling: 25,000 ft (7,600 m)
- Rate of climb: 2,300 ft/min (12 m/s)
- Wing loading: 9.1 lb/sq ft (44 kg/m^{2})

== See also ==
- List of aerobatic aircraft
