= Thatcher CX4 =

American homebuilt aircraft

CX4
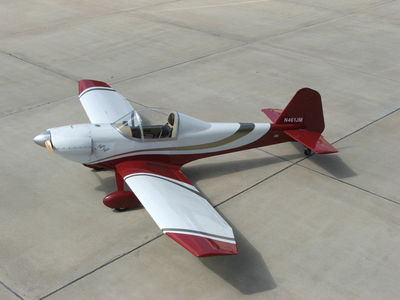

General information
- Type: Homebuilt aircraft
- National origin: United States
- Manufacturer: Thatcher Aircraft, Inc.
- Designer: David Thatcher
- Status: Plans and parts available (2016)
- Number built: 55 (4/2017)

History
- First flight: 2004

The Thatcher CX4 is an American-designed aircraft for amateur construction designed by David Thatcher of Pensacola, Florida and plans are supplied by Thatcher Aircraft, Inc.

Westberry Manufacturing supplies many parts and kits for the aircraft.

== Design and development ==
The CX4 is a low wing, single-seat, conventional landing gear equipped aircraft, designed to be simple to build and safe to fly. The name of the plane, CX4, is taken from an old radio show featuring Hop Harrigan, whose plane was called CX4.

The aircraft is all metal, 6061-T6 aluminium, except the cowling. The aluminum main gear legs are sourced from a Monnett Sonerai with hydraulic disc toe brakes. It has a heater and ventilation system for all season flying. The aircraft can be built with an optional 3 gal aux fuel tank. The CX4's standard specified powerplant is a Volkswagen air-cooled engine. The design load factor is 3.8 g, with an ultimate load of 5.7 g.

The CX4 first flew in 2004. As of April, 2017, there were 55 flying CX4s in Australia, Brazil, Canada, New Zealand, South Africa, and the United States. The fleet had flown 3316.6 hours total.

== Specifications (Thatcher CX4) ==
Data from Sport Aviation March 2009

General characteristics

- Crew: one
- Length: 18 ft 3 in (5.56 m)
- Wingspan: 24 ft (7.3 m)
- Height: 4 ft 8 in (1.42 m)
- Wing area: 84 sq ft (7.8 m^{2})
- Empty weight: 520 lb (236 kg)
- Gross weight: 850 lb (386 kg)
- Fuel capacity: 10.5 gal (39.7L)
- Powerplant: 1 × Volkswagen horizontally opposed, automotive conversion piston engine, 65 hp (48 kW)
- Propellers: 2-bladed

Performance

- Cruise speed: 109 kn (125 mph, 201 km/h)
- Stall speed: 35 kn (40 mph, 64 km/h)
- Never exceed speed: 135 kn (155 mph, 249 km/h)
- Service ceiling: 10,000 ft (3,000 m)
- Rate of climb: 825 ft/min (4.19 m/s)

== See also ==
Related development

- Thatcher CX5

Aircraft of comparable role, configuration, and era

- BK Fliers BK-1
- Corby Starlet
- Hummelbird
- Hummel Ultra Cruiser
- Sonex Aircraft Onex
