= Hummel H5 =

American homebuilt aircraft

H5
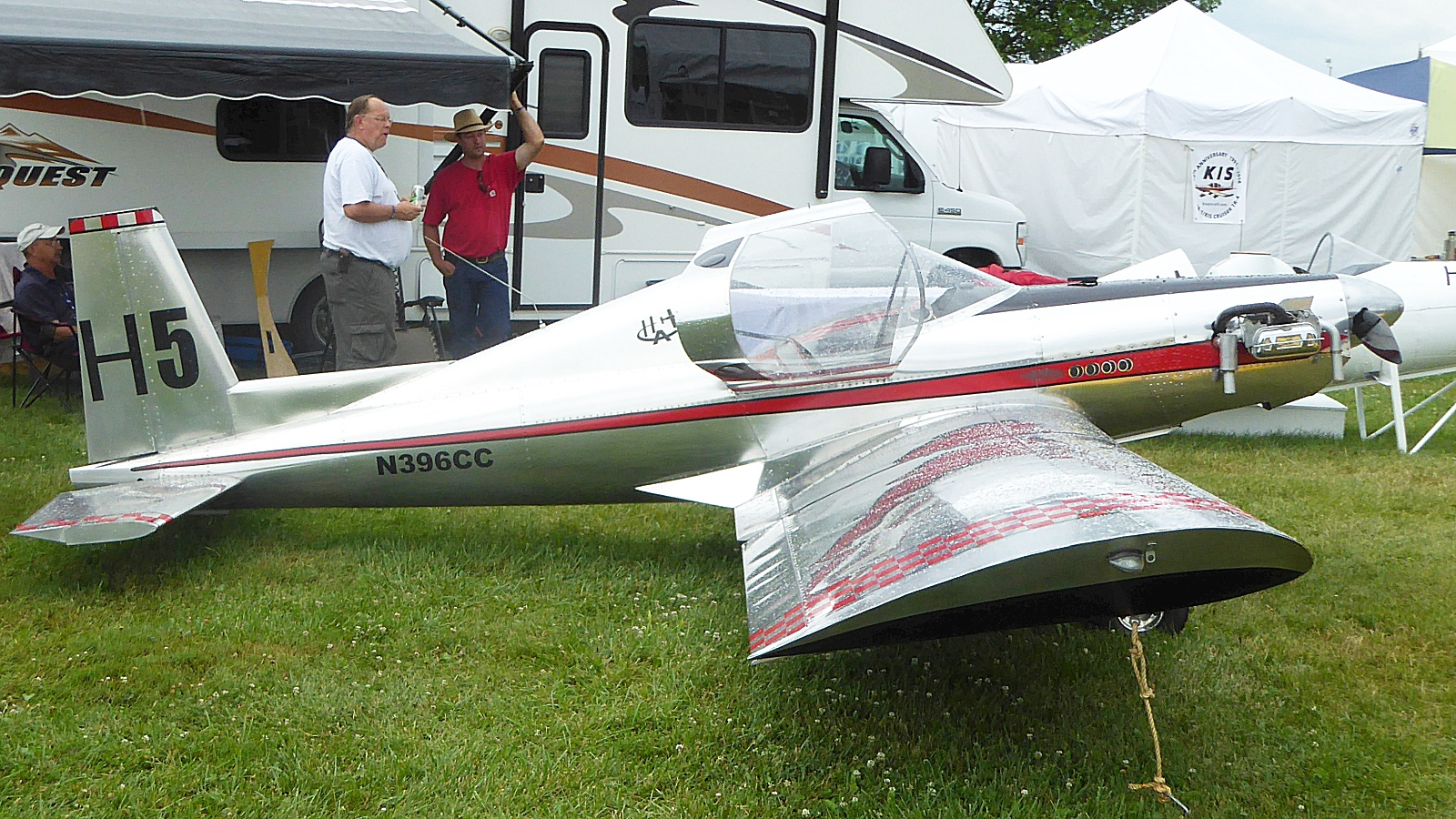

General information
- Type: Amateur-built aircraft
- National origin: United States
- Manufacturer: Hummel Aviation
- Designer: Morry Hummel
- Status: In production (2012)
- Number built: 12 (2011)

History
- Developed from: Hummel Ultracruiser Plus

The Hummel H5 is an American amateur-built aircraft, designed by Morry Hummel and produced by Hummel Aviation. The aircraft is supplied as a kit or plans for amateur construction.

== Design and development ==
The H5 is a development of the Hummel Ultracruiser Plus and has a gross weight that is heavier than the original Hummel Bird.

The H5 features a cantilever low-wing, a single-seat enclosed cockpit under a bubble canopy, fixed conventional landing gear, or optionally tricycle landing gear, and a single engine in tractor configuration. The cockpit is 24.5 in (62 cm) wide.

The aircraft is made from sheet aluminum. Its 22.5 ft (6.9 m) (optionally 25 ft (7.6 m)) span wing employs a Harry Ribblett GA30-618 airfoil and has an area of 100 sq ft (9.3 m^{2}). The aircraft's recommended engine power range is 60 to 85 hp (45 to 63 kW) and standard engines used include the 60 to 85 hp (45 to 63 kW) Volkswagen air-cooled engine four-stroke. Construction time from the supplied kit is estimated as 420 hours.

== Operational history ==
By December 2011 twelve examples had been completed and flown.

== Specifications (H5) ==
Data from Kitplanes and Hummel Aviation

General characteristics

- Crew: one
- Length: 17 ft (5.2 m)
- Wingspan: 22 ft 6 in (6.86 m)
- Wing area: 100 sq ft (9.3 m^{2})
- Airfoil: Harry Ribblett GA30-618
- Empty weight: 457 lb (207 kg)
- Gross weight: 850 lb (386 kg)
- Fuel capacity: 20 U.S. gallons (76 L; 17 imp gal) with optional tanks
- Powerplant: 1 × Volkswagen air-cooled engine four cylinder, air-cooled, four stroke automotive conversion, 85 hp (63 kW)
- Propellers: 2-bladed wooden

Performance

- Cruise speed: 120 mph (190 km/h, 100 kn)
- Stall speed: 46 mph (74 km/h, 40 kn)
- Never exceed speed: 150 mph (240 km/h, 130 kn)
- Range: 500 mi (800 km, 430 nmi)
- g limits: +/-3.8
- Rate of climb: 1,200 ft/min (6.1 m/s)
- Wing loading: 8.5 lb/sq ft (42 kg/m^{2})
