= Hummel Aviation =

American aircraft manufacturer

- Type: Privately held company
- Industry: Aerospace
- Founded: 1983
- Founder: James Morris (Morry) Hummel
- Headquarters: Bryan, Ohio, United States
- Products: Kit aircraft
- Website: www.hummelaircraft.com

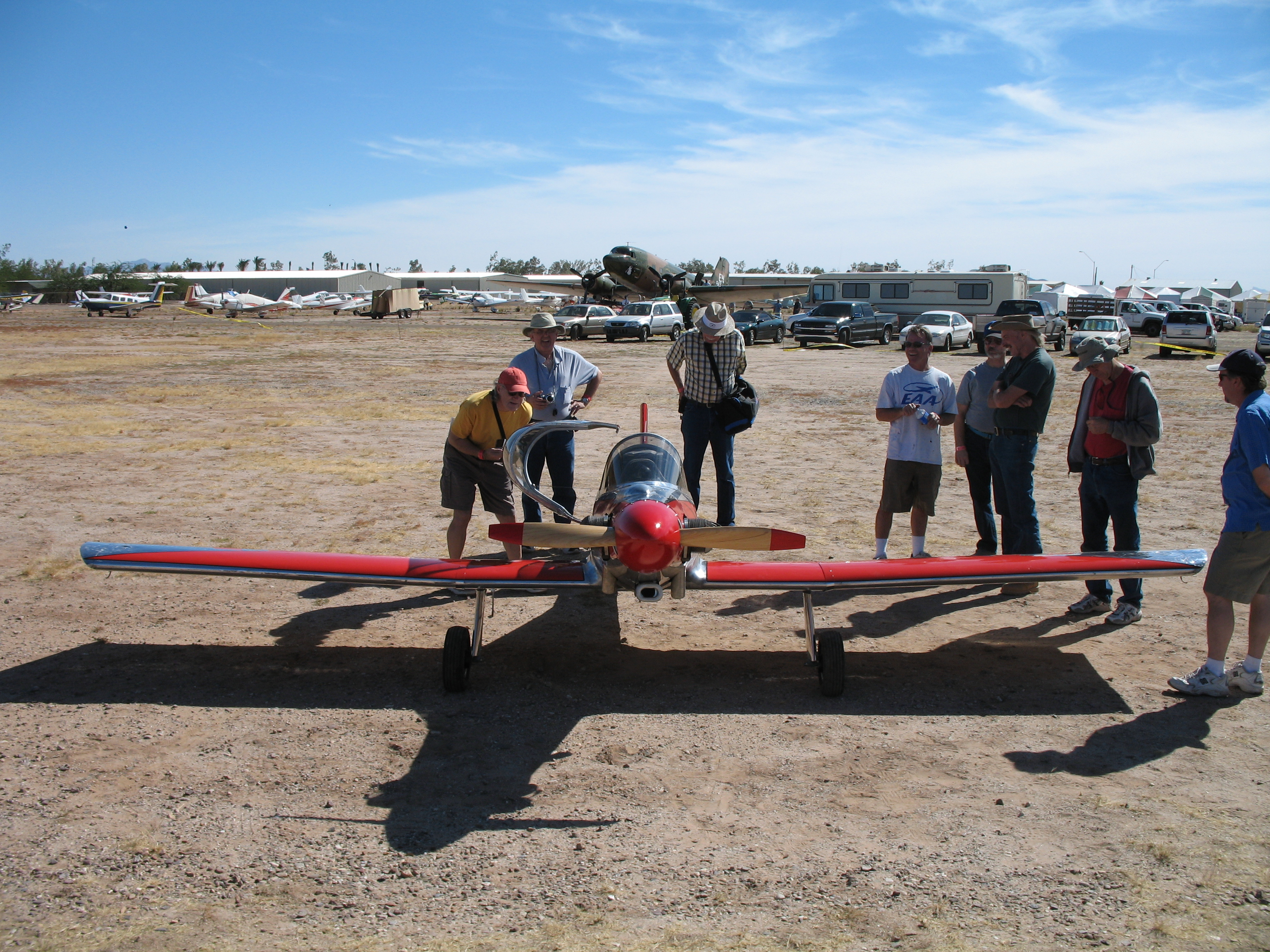
Hummel Bird

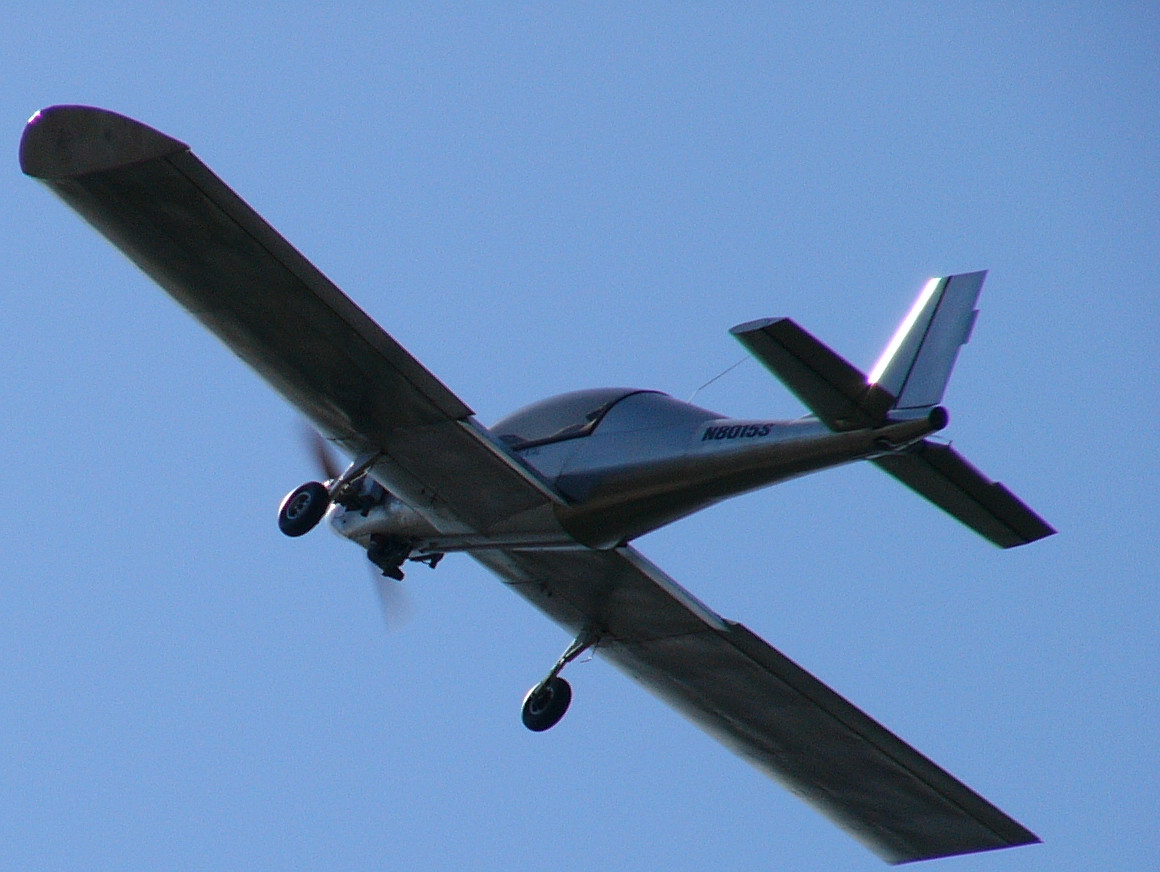
Hummel UltraCruiser

Hummel Aviation is an American aircraft manufacturer based in Bryan, Ohio and founded by James Morris (Morry) Hummel in 1983. The company specializes in the design and manufacture of ultralight aircraft in the form of plans and kits for amateur construction.

The company was formed in 1983 to produce Hummel's initial Hummel Bird design. The plane was named by Jack Cox in a Sport Aviation magazine article reviewing the design. On 9 July 1995 Hummel was involved in an aircraft accident when a bolt broke in the aileron control system of the Mini-MAX he was flying. Hummel was seriously injured and designed the Hummel UltraCruiser shortly thereafter as a consequence of a religious revelation he had during his recovery. The UltraCruiser prototype was started in 1999 and was completed in June 2000. In April 2002 a new version of the UltraCruiser was designed for larger pilots, the Hummel UltraCruiser Plus. Another derivative model for larger pilots, the Hummel H5, was the most recent addition to the company's line.

== Aircraft ==
Summary of aircraft built by Hummel Aviation
Model name	First flight	Number built	Type
Hummel Bird	1982	150 (1998)	Single seat homebuilt aircraft
Adams CA-2	1992	3 (1998)	Single seat homebuilt aircraft designed by Frank Griffith and sold by Hummel 1999-early 2000s
Hummel Ultracruiser	2000	100 (2011)	Single seat ultralight aircraft
Hummel Ultracruiser Plus	2002		Single seat ultralight aircraft for larger pilots
Hummel H5		12 (2011)	Single seat homebuilt aircraft
HummelMulticruiser	2026	1 (2026)	Single seat twin engine ultralight aircraft designed by Matt Higgins
