= Bradley Aerospace =

American aircraft manufacturer

Bradley Aerospace, Inc.
- Company type: Privately held company
- Industry: Aerospace
- Founder: Bradley Huggins
- Fate: Out of business
- Headquarters: Chico, California, United States
- Products: Kit aircraft

Bradley Aerospace, Inc. was an American aircraft manufacturer, founded by Bradley Huggins and based in Chico, California. The company specialized in the design and manufacture of light aircraft in the form of kits for amateur construction.

In April 2015 the company's corporate status was listed as "suspended".

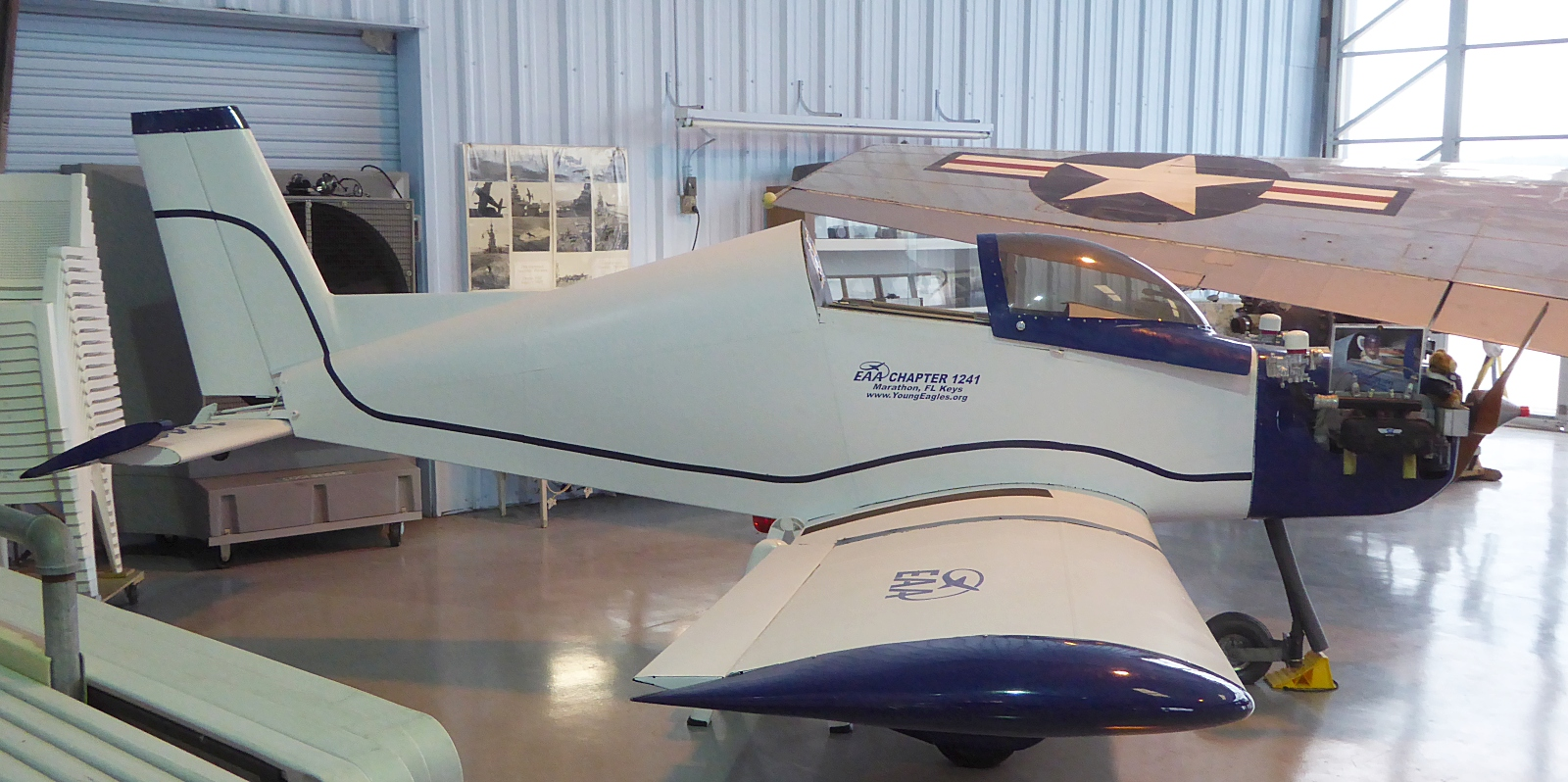
Bradley BA-100 Aerobat

The company marketed a kit for its all-metal aerobatic Bradley BA-100 Aerobat and then went on to design a two-seat aerobatic aircraft, the Bradley BA-200 ATAC, although only one was built. A third design, the Bradley BA-300 Himat, does not seem to have progressed to the completion of a prototype.

== Aircraft ==
Summary of aircraft built by Bradley Aerospace
Model name	First flight	Number built	Type
Bradley BA-100 Aerobat			Single seat aerobatic aircraft
Bradley BA-200 ATAC			Two seat aerobatic aircraft
Bradley BA-300 Himat			three seat canard pusher configuration aircraft
