= Bradley BA-300 Himat =

BA-300 Himat

General information
- Type: Homebuilt aircraft
- National origin: United States
- Manufacturer: Bradley Aerospace
- Status: Not built

History
- Introduction date: mid-1990s

The Bradley BA-300 Himat was a proposed American canard homebuilt aircraft from Bradley Aerospace, introduced in the mid-1990s. The aircraft was to have been supplied as a kit for amateur construction, but it does not seem to have progressed to the prototype stage.

== Design and development ==
The BA-300 Himat was to have featured a canard layout, with three seats in an enclosed cabin and pusher configuration. It was to have a cruise speed of 400 mph (640 km/h).

The BA-300 was to fit a belly tank that would hold 100 U.S. gallons (380 L; 83 imp gal) of fuel to allow a range of over 3,000 mi (4,800 km). The belly tank was to have also been convertible for other uses, including plans for drop-doors.

== Operational history ==
In April 2015 no examples were registered in the United States with the Federal Aviation Administration.

== Specifications (BA-300 Himat) ==
Data from AeroCrafter

General characteristics

- Crew: one
- Capacity: two passengers
- Fuel capacity: 100 U.S. gallons (380 L; 83 imp gal)
- Powerplant: 1 × aircraft engine

Performance

- Cruise speed: 400 mph (640 km/h, 350 kn)
- Stall speed: 60 mph (97 km/h, 52 kn)
- Range: 3,000 mi (4,800 km, 2,600 nmi)
