= Revmaster R-2300 =

R-2300
- Type: Horizontally opposed piston engine
- National origin: USA
- Manufacturer: Revmaster
- Designer: Joe Horvath
- Major applications: Experimental Aircraft
- Developed from: Volkswagen air-cooled engine

The Revmaster R-2300 is a 4 stroke aircraft engine for Homebuilt aircraft

== Design and development ==
The engine is based on the Volkswagen air-cooled engine. It is extensively modified for aircraft use. This modification consists of a quad CDI ignition (8 coils), new and enlarged #4 bearing, custom made crank shaft and cam shaft, custom made cylinder heads and other modifications. The engine is delivered completely assembled and test run from the factory (it is not delivered as a kit).

== Applications ==
- Thatcher CX5
- Sonex Aircraft Onex

== Specifications (variant) ==
=== General characteristics ===
- Bore: 94mm
- Stroke: 84mm
- Displacement: 2331cc
- Dry weight: 170 lbs
- Designer: Joseph Horvath

=== Components ===
- Valvetrain: Single overhead exhaust valve, single overhead inlet valve per cylinder
- Fuel system: RevFlow 36mm
- Cooling system: Air-cooled

=== Performance ===
- Power output: 85hp
- Compression ratio: 8:1
