= Watson GW-1 Windwagon =

American recreational ultralight designed in 1976 by Gary Watson

GW-1 Windwagon

General information
- Type: recreational ultralight
- National origin: United States
- Manufacturer: homebuilt
- Designer: Gary Watson

History
- First flight: April 19, 1977

The Watson WG-1 Windwagon is a single-seat recreational ultralight designed in the United States in 1976 and marketed for homebuilding. Designer Gary Watson originally sold kits as well as plans, but later sold only plans.

== Design and development ==
The Windwagon is a low-wing cantilever monoplane of conventional design with fixed, tricycle undercarriage, and a single-seat open cockpit. Construction is of pop-riveted metal throughout. The outer wing panels are removable to facilitate hangering and trailering.

Power is supplied by an air-cooled, tractor-mounted piston engine driving a propeller. The engine selected by Watson was an automotive Volkswagen air-cooled engine sawn in half across its crankcase to turn the flat-four engine into a flat-two (a modification called a "half VW"). Plans for the Windwagon included instructions for modifying a Volkswagen engine this way.

By 1987, Watson had sold over 1,025 sets of plans, and over 500 Windwagons had been built around the world.

The Hummel Bird is a development of this design.

== Specifications (as designed) ==
Data from Jane's All The World's Aircraft 1987-88, p.732

General characteristics

- Crew: 1 pilot
- Length: 13 ft 0 in (3.96 m)
- Wingspan: 18 ft 0 in (5.49 m)
- Height: 3 ft 6 in (1.07 m)
- Wing area: 54 sq ft (5.0 m^{2})
- Empty weight: 273 lb (124 kg)
- Max takeoff weight: 485 lb (220 kg)
- Powerplant: 1 × Half VW 2-cylinder horizontally opposed air-cooled piston automotive engine, 30 hp (22 kW)

Performance

- Maximum speed: 135 mph (217 km/h, 117 kn)
- Cruise speed: 100 mph (160 km/h, 87 kn)(flaps and undercarriage down)
- Range: 300 mi (480 km, 260 nmi)
- Service ceiling: 12,000 ft (3,700 m)
- Rate of climb: 450 ft/min (2.3 m/s) max. climb at sea level
- Wing loading: 8.98 lb/sq ft (43.8 kg/m^{2})
