= Thatcher CX5 =

CX5

General information
- Type: Homebuilt aircraft
- National origin: United States
- Designer: Dave Thatcher

History
- First flight: 17 December 2013

The Thatcher CX5 is an American homebuilt aircraft that was designed by Dave Thatcher.

== Development ==
The CX5 is a two place, all metal, low-wing, tricycle gear-equipped aircraft. The prototype aircraft is outfitted with a Revmaster R-2300. The wings have upturned outer sections for dihedral.

== Specifications (CX5) ==
Data from EAA, Flying Magazine

General characteristics

- Crew: 2 tandem
- Capacity: 2 passengers
- Length: 19.5 ft (5.9 m)
- Wingspan: 28 ft (8.5 m)
- Height: 6.5 ft (2.0 m)
- Empty weight: 721 lb (327 kg)
- Gross weight: 1,320 lb (599 kg)
- Fuel capacity: 10.5 U.S. gallons (40 L; 8.7 imp gal)
- Powerplant: 1 × Revmaster Volkswagen air-cooled engine conversion horizontally opposed piston engine, 85 hp (63 kW)
- Propellers: 2-bladed wooden

Performance

- Maximum speed: 109 kn (125 mph, 201 km/h)
- Cruise speed: 94 kn (108 mph, 174 km/h)
- Stall speed: 33 kn (38 mph, 61 km/h)

== See also ==
Related development

- Thatcher CX4

Aircraft of comparable role, configuration, and era

- Sonex Aircraft Sonex
