= Hummel Ultracruiser =

American ultralight airplane

Ultracruiser
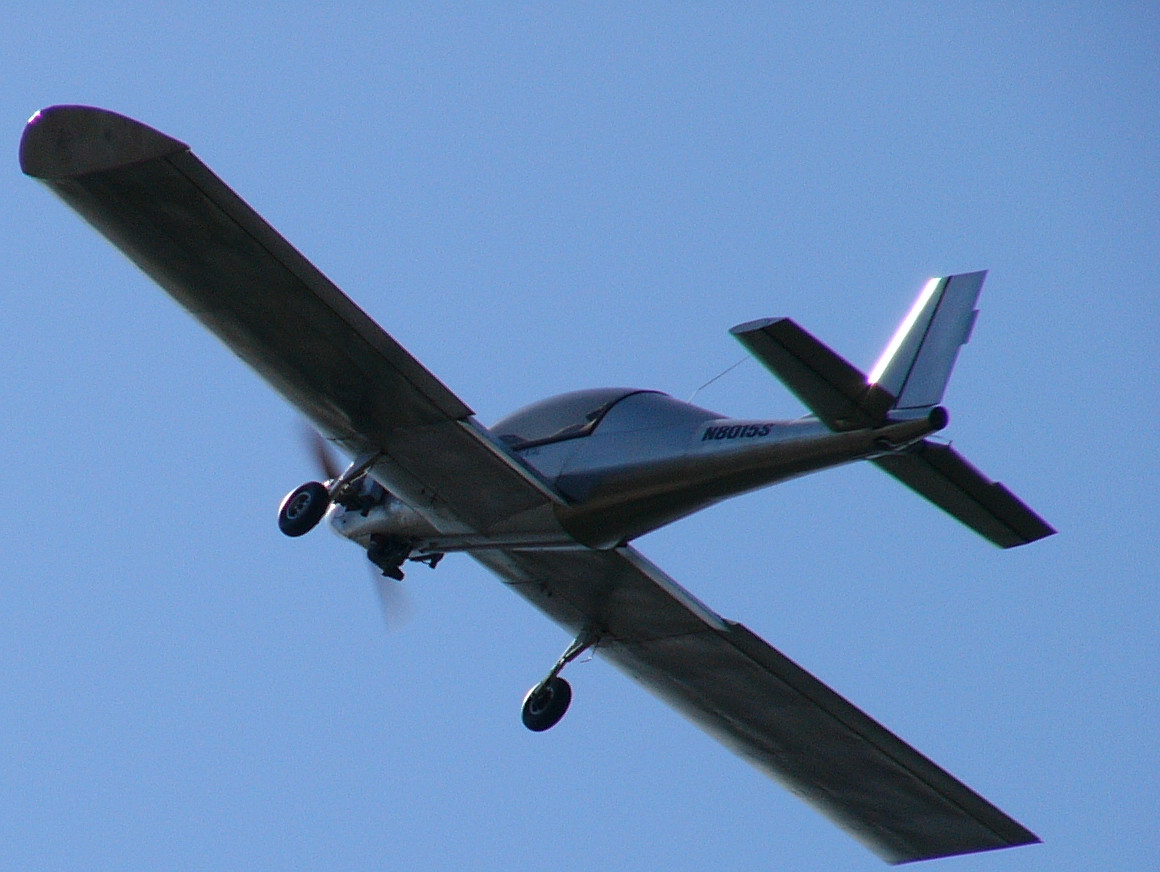

General information
- Type: Amateur-built aircraft
- National origin: United States
- Manufacturer: Hummel Aviation
- Designer: Morry Hummel
- Status: In production (2012)
- Number built: 100 (2011)

History
- First flight: 2000
- Developed from: Hummel Bird
- Variant: Hummel H5

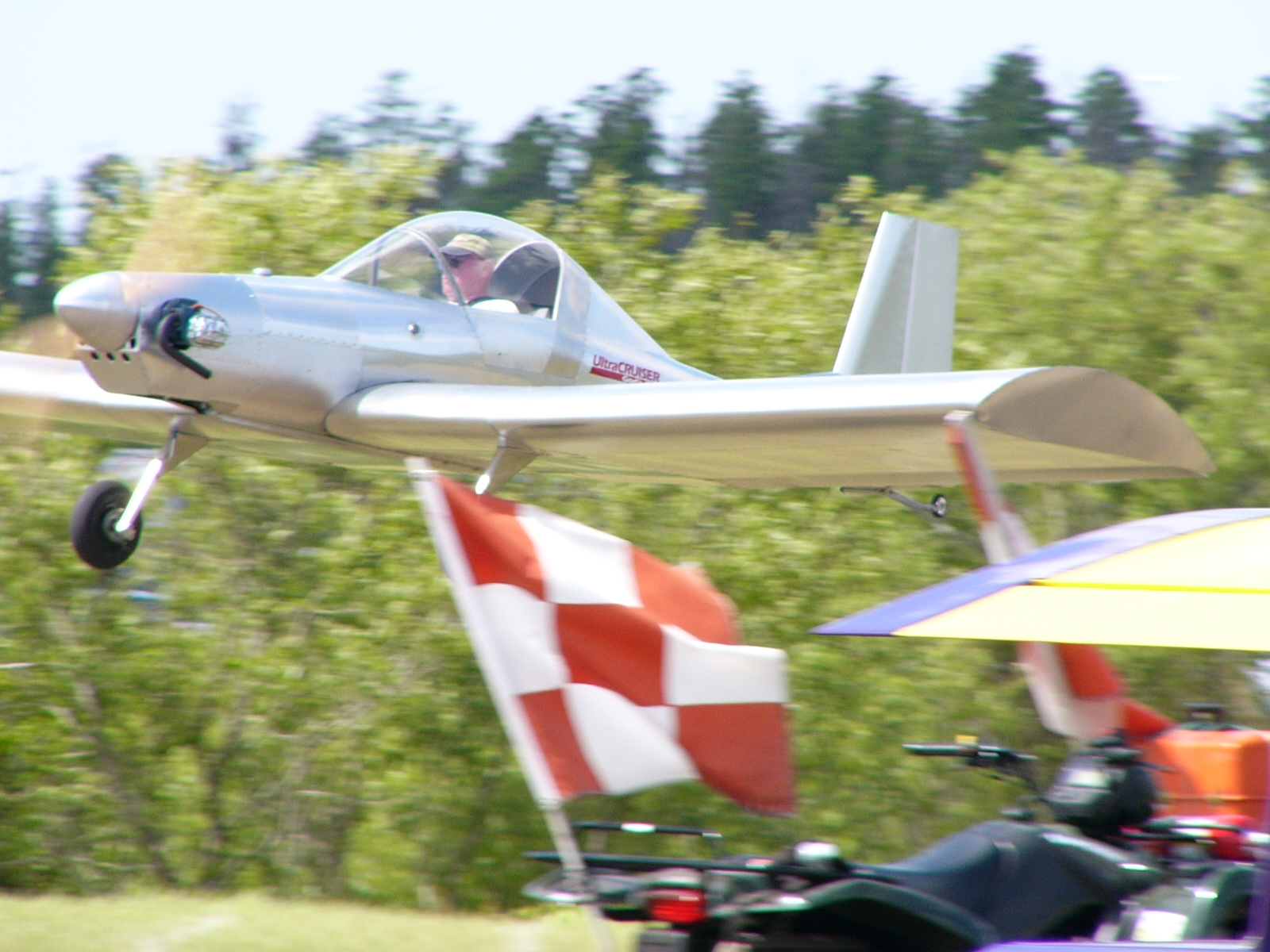
Hummelbird Ultra Cruiser landing at Sun 'n Fun 2004, Lakeland, Florida, United States

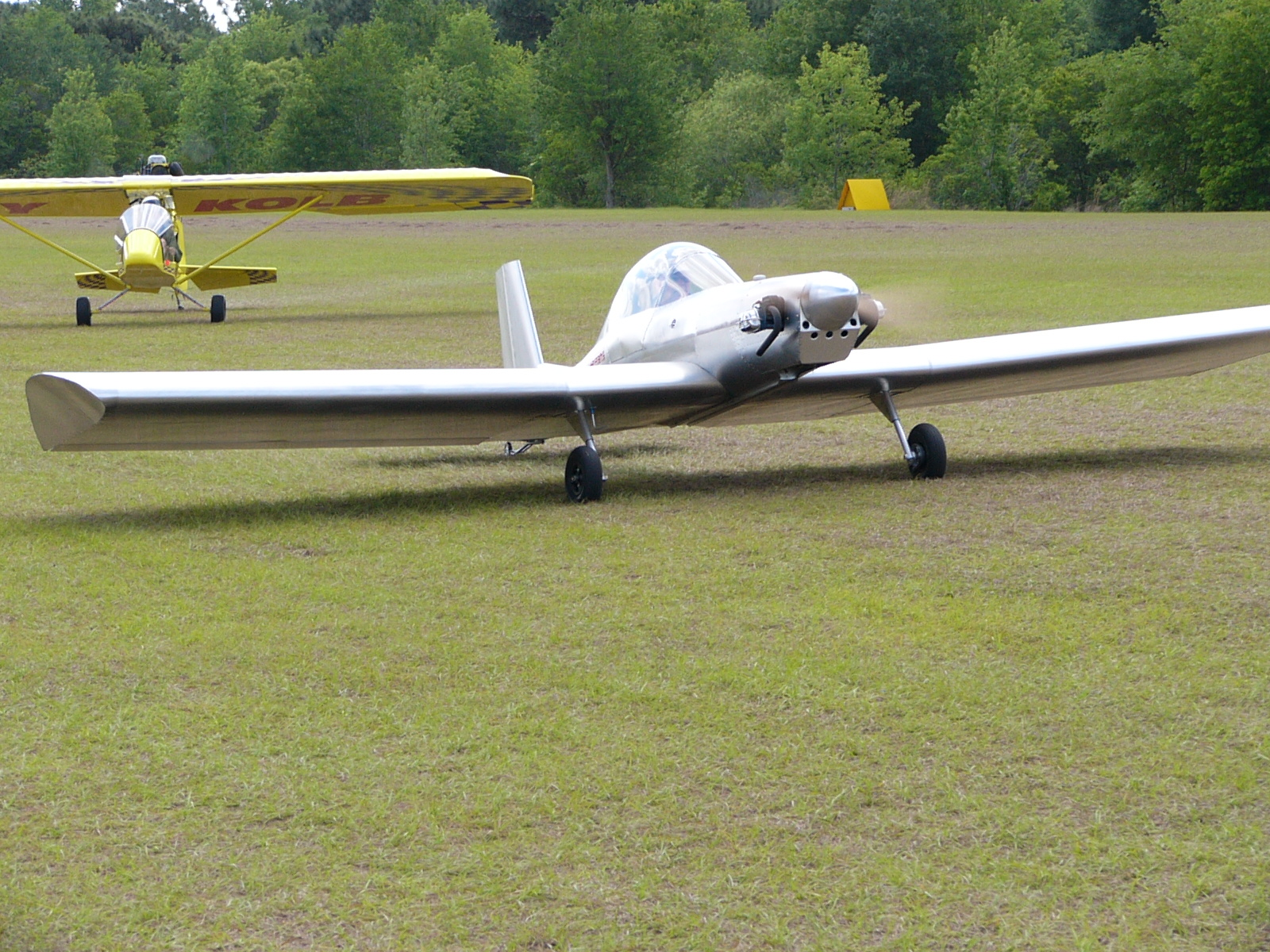
Hummelbird Ultra Cruiser taxiing at Sun 'n Fun 2004, Lakeland, Florida, United States

The Hummel Ultracruiser (also variously called the Ultra Cruiser and UltraCruiser) is an American amateur-built aircraft, designed by Morry Hummel and produced by Hummel Aviation. The aircraft is supplied as a kit or plans for amateur construction or as a complete ready-to-fly aircraft.

== Design and development ==
The Ultracruiser is a development of the heavier Hummel Bird, designed to comply with the US FAR 103 Ultralight Vehicles rules, including the category's maximum empty weight of 254 lb (115 kg). The aircraft has a standard empty weight of 249 lb (113 kg).

The Ultracruiser features a cantilever low-wing, a single-seat open, or optionally enclosed, cockpit that is 23.5 in (60 cm) wide, fixed conventional landing gear, or optionally tricycle landing gear and a single engine in tractor configuration.

The aircraft is made from sheet aluminum. Its 25 ft (7.6 m) span wing employs a Harry C. Riblett GA30-618 airfoil and has an area of 112 sq ft (10.4 m^{2}). The aircraft's recommended engine power range is 28 to 45 hp (21 to 34 kW) and standard engines used include the 37 hp (28 kW) 1/2 VW four-stroke powerplant. Construction time from the supplied kit is estimated as 420 hours.

== Operational history ==
As of December 2011, 100 examples had been completed and flown.

== Variants ==
Ultracruiser
Base model for the US FAR 103 Ultralight Vehicles category, powered by a 37 hp (28 kW) 1/2 VW.
Ultracruiser Plus
Model for larger and heavier pilots, powered by a 60 hp (45 kW) Volkswagen air-cooled engine, for the US experimental amateur-built category.

== Specifications (Ultracruiser) ==
Data from Kitplanes and Hummel Aviation

General characteristics

- Crew: one
- Length: 16 ft (4.9 m)
- Wingspan: 25 ft (7.6 m)
- Wing area: 112 sq ft (10.4 m^{2})
- Airfoil: Harry Riblett GA30-618
- Empty weight: 249 lb (113 kg)
- Gross weight: 500 lb (227 kg)
- Fuel capacity: 5 U.S. gallons (19 L; 4.2 imp gal)
- Powerplant: 1 × 1/2 VW two cylinder, air-cooled, four stroke automotive conversion, 37 hp (28 kW)
- Propellers: 2-bladed wooden

Performance

- Cruise speed: 60 mph (97 km/h, 52 kn)
- Stall speed: 28 mph (45 km/h, 24 kn)
- Never exceed speed: 95 mph (153 km/h, 83 kn)
- Rate of climb: 1,000 ft/min (5.1 m/s)
- Wing loading: 4.5 lb/sq ft (22 kg/m^{2})
