= Hummel Bird =

American amateur-built aircraft

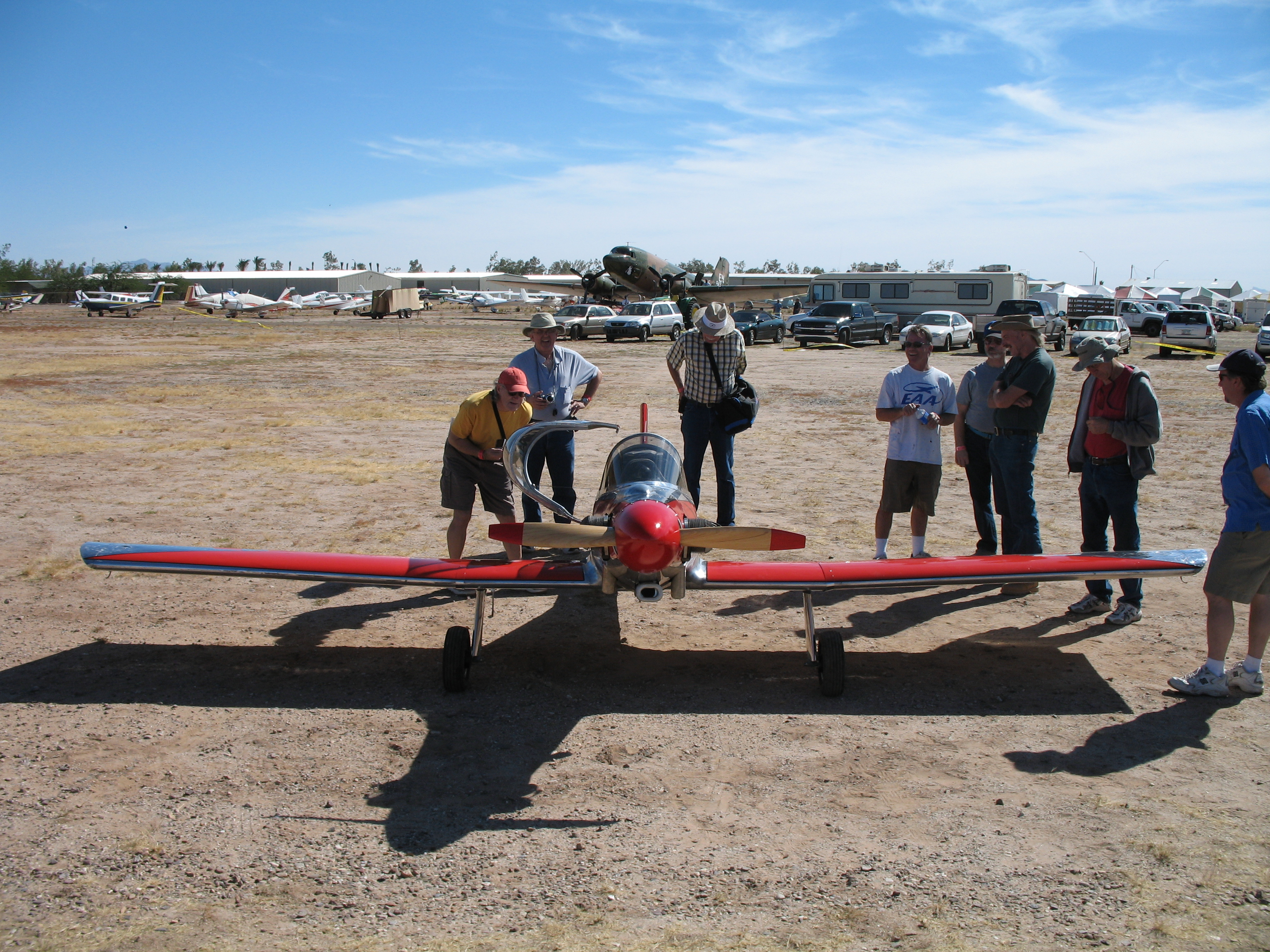

General information
- Type: Homebuilt aircraft
- National origin: United States
- Manufacturer: Hummel Aviation
- Designer: Morry Hummel

History
- Introduction date: 1982
- Developed from: Teenie Two
- Variants: Hummel H5; Hummel Ultracruiser

The Hummel Bird is an experimental/amateur built aircraft designed by Morry Hummel and produced by Hummel Aviation of Byran, Ohio, United States. It is a single-seat, single-engine, all-metal airplane typically powered by a 1/2 VW engine in the 32 hp-45 hp range although other engines have been used successfully. It is built from plans, but many of the components are available pre-made from Hummel Aviation.

== Development ==
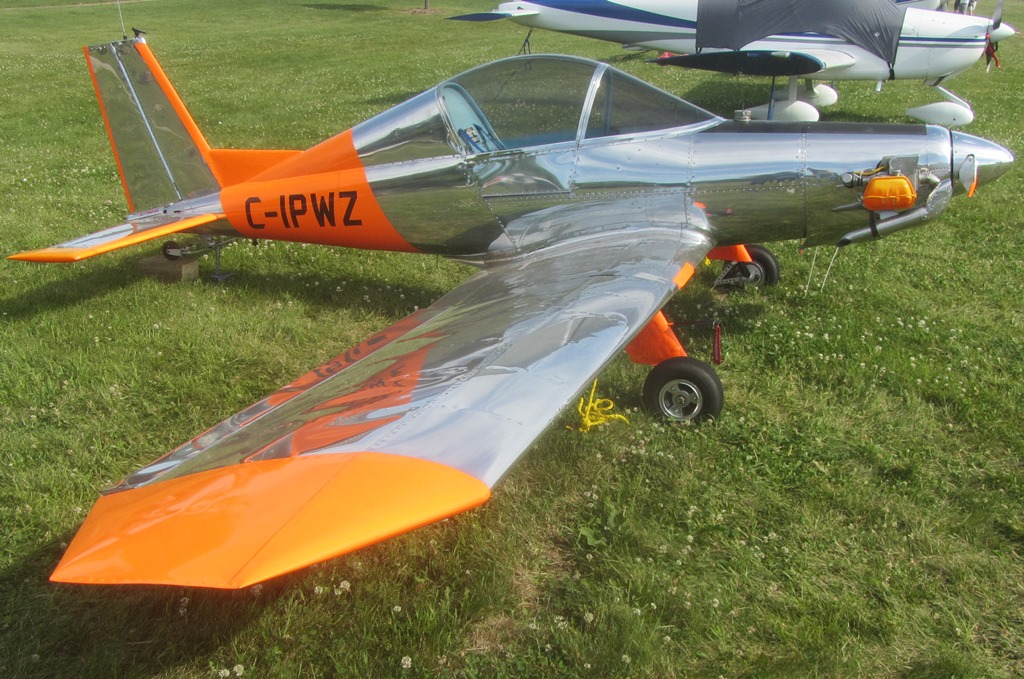
Hummel Bird with half-VW engine

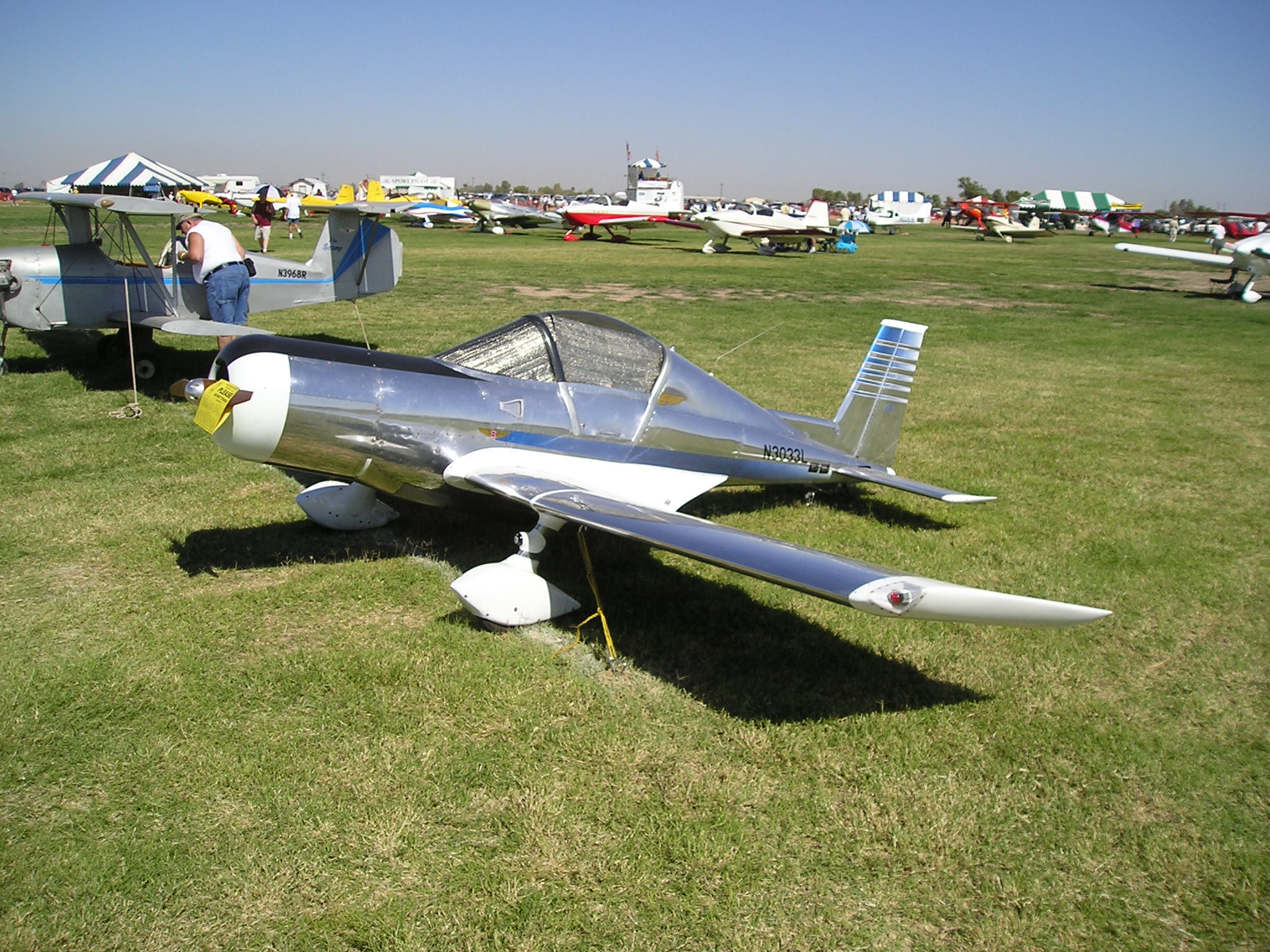
Hummel Bird with custom AeroMorph engine and round cowl

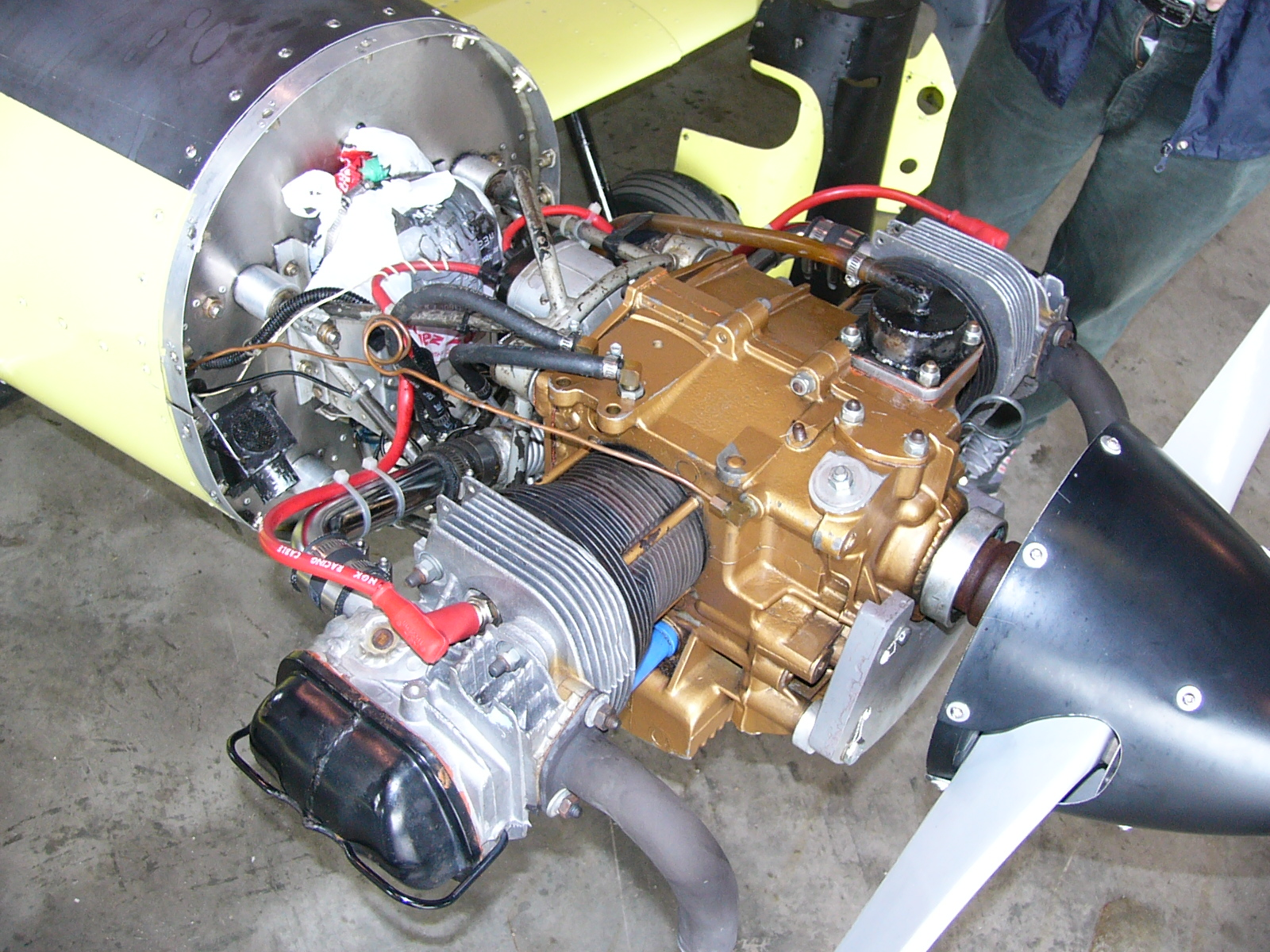
1/2 Volkswagen engine mounted in a Hummel Bird

The Hummel Bird is a derivative of an earlier design known as the Parker Teenie Two. Originally designed by Calvin Parker, the design was featured in Popular Mechanics in May 1971. Plans for the Teenie Two were originally offered for sale in 1969, and are still offered today, with more than 12,000 sets sold.

The next generation of the design was called the Watson GW-1 Windwagon. Designed by Gary Watson, the windwagon shares a great deal of the design elements of the Teenie Two and debuted at the Experimental Aircraft Association fly-in in Oshkosh, Wisconsin in 1978. The most obvious variation from the Teenie Two is in the fuselage. The Windwagon fuselage is smaller and is essentially a union of two cones. One that starts at the seat back and tapers to the back bulkhead and another that tapers forward of the seat back to the firewall. This design element would carry on to the Hummel Bird.

In the fall of 1979, Morry Hummel, who worked in the Curtis Wright experimental department during World War II, purchased the plans for Gary Watson's Windwagon and the development of the "Hummel Bird" began. Because of the weather in Hummel's state of Ohio, a canopy was needed. The horizontal stabilizer attach construction was redesigned. The seat back was raised five inches so a shoulder harness could be added, and the instrument panel was raised 2 inches, increasing fuel capacity and leg room. The wing was completely re-engineered. The dihedral break on the Windwagon was in the middle; Hummel made the center wing section straight and put the dihedral break at the point where the outer wing panels bolt to the center section. The Hummel Bird spar is built up of 1/8 6061-t6 aluminum angle spar caps, with a .040, 2024-t3 spar web. The spar cap angles are doubled in the center section, and tapered in the outer panels. The number of ribs was increased, the thickness of the skin was reduced, and the skins get even thinner toward the tips. The ribs are now a two-piece design with one in front of the spar(nose rib) and one between the spars(main rib). The skins are riveted to the spars leaving no bump where the one piece ribs previously pushed the skin up where it crossed the spar. Both the Teenie Two and the Windwagon had tricycle landing gear; however, Hummel preferred conventional landing gear so taildragger gear became a popular option. There were other changes as well, compromising a significant improvement over the wind wagon. He finished his project in July 1980. In July 1982, the plane was featured in an article written by Jack Cox of Sport Aviation. Cox dubbed Hummel's new creation the "Hummel Bird", and the name stuck.

Originally builders had to buy Windwagon plans as well as Hummel's modifications and try to incorporate the two. This proved very difficult. One of those builders was Bill Spring. An engineer by profession, Spring took many photos and consulted with Hummel until he had the complete design. He then created CAD drawings and a builder's manual which now comprise the plans package available from Hummel Aviation.

Despite the misconception, the Hummel Bird is not an ultralight aircraft in the US. Its empty weight exceeds the specified 254 pounds, it carries more than 5 gallons of fuel, it stalls at a speed above 24 knots, and its top speed is well beyond the ultralight limit of 55 knots. In Canada it does meet the requirements for a Basic Ultralight Aeroplane.

== Variations ==
Some notable variations of the aircraft include:

Fuel: The standard location of the fuel tank is forward of the instrument panel. Some builders have moved it to the leading edges of the wings. By creating a sealed leading edge tank, the fuel is moved away from the pilot for better crash survivability with the added benefit of more than doubling the fuel capacity.

Fuselage: The plans state that a builder can increase the width and/or height of the bulkheads in an effort to make the fuselage more hospitable for larger pilots.

Engines: The standard engine for the design is the four-stroke, 1/2 VW engine, an engine literally made by cutting the block of a standard four-cylinder VW engine in half. After machining and welding, the remaining two-cylinder engine is light and powerful. Alternative engines include the more powerful but heavier four-cylinder VW engine, the two-stroke Rotax 447, and even the McCulloch 0-100-1 drone engine popular with the early gyrocopter builders.

== Variants ==
Hummel Ultracruiser
Ultralight variant

== Specifications (Hummel Bird) ==
Data from Hummel website

General characteristics

- Crew: 1
- Capacity: 230 lb (104.3 kg)
- Length: 13 ft 4.0 in (4.064 m)
- Wingspan: 18 ft 0 in (5.486 m)
- Wing area: 57.2 sq ft (5.31 m^{2})
- Airfoil: Clark Y (modified)
- Empty weight: 300 lb (136 kg)
- Gross weight: 530 lb (240 kg)
- Fuel capacity: 6 US gal (22.7 L)
- Powerplant: 1 × Volkswagen ½ VW engine 2-cyl. air-cooled horizontally opposed piston engine, 32 hp (24 kW) to 45 hp (33.6 kW)

Performance

- Maximum speed: 126 kn (145 mph, 233 km/h)
- Cruise speed: 87 kn (100 mph, 160 km/h) to 115 mph (185.1 km/h)
- Stall speed: 33 kn (38 mph, 61 km/h)
- Range: 170 nmi (200 mi, 320 km)
- Service ceiling: 10,000 ft (3,000 m)
- g limits: 6
- Power/mass: .060 to .084 hp/lb (0.0986 to 0.138 kW/kg)
- Takeoff distance 300 ft (91.4 m) (over 50 ft (15.2 m) obstacle) – 1,000 ft (304.8 m)
- Landing roll – 800 ft (243.8 m)
