= Bradley Aerobat =

American homebuilt aircraft

BA 100 Aerobat
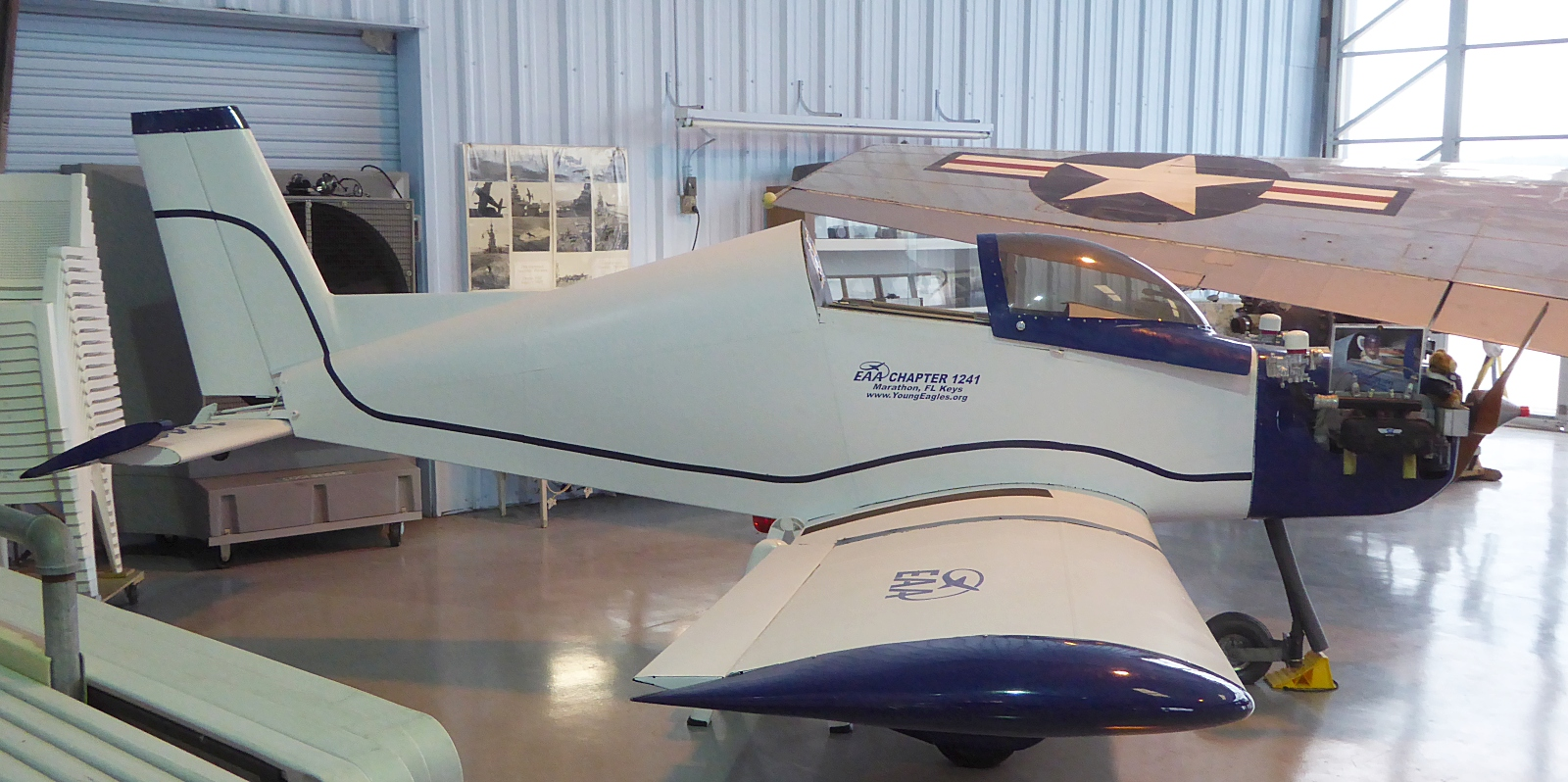

General information
- Type: Homebuilt aircraft
- National origin: United States
- Manufacturer: Bradley Aerospace
- Status: Production completed

The Bradley BA 100 Aerobat is an American aerobatic homebuilt aircraft that was designed and produced by Bradley Aerospace of Chico, California. When it was available the aircraft was supplied as a kit for amateur construction.

== Design and development ==
The BA 100 Aerobat features a cantilever low-wing, a single-seat enclosed cockpit under a bubble canopy, fixed tricycle landing gear, or optional conventional landing gear, and a single engine in tractor configuration.

The all-metal aircraft is made from sheet aluminum. Its 18.40 ft (5.6 m) span wing lacks flaps and has a wing area of 63.00 sq ft (5.853 m^{2}). The cabin width is 22 in (56 cm). The acceptable power range is 70 to 100 hp (52 to 75 kW) and the standard powerplant is the 70 hp (52 kW) Volkswagen air-cooled engine. For aerobatics the BA 100 is stressed to +/-9g

The BA 100 Aerobat has a typical empty weight of 348 lb (158 kg) and a gross weight of 620 lb (280 kg), giving a useful load of 272 lb (123 kg). With full fuel of 10 U.S. gallons (38 L; 8.3 imp gal) the payload for pilot and baggage is 212 lb (96 kg).

Factory kit options included conventional landing gear and a STOL kit. The manufacturer estimated the construction time from the supplied kit as 150 hours.

== Operational history ==
By 1998 the company reported that 33 kits had been sold and 28 aircraft were flying.

In December 2013 three examples were registered in the United States with the Federal Aviation Administration.

== Specifications (BA 100 Aerobat) ==
Data from AeroCrafter

General characteristics

- Crew: one
- Length: 14 ft 6 in (4.42 m)
- Wingspan: 18 ft 5 in (5.61 m)
- Wing area: 63.00 sq ft (5.853 m^{2})
- Empty weight: 348 lb (158 kg)
- Gross weight: 620 lb (281 kg)
- Fuel capacity: 10 U.S. gallons (38 L; 8.3 imp gal)
- Powerplant: 1 × Volkswagen air-cooled engine four cylinder, air-cooled, four stroke automotive conversion engine, 70 hp (52 kW)
- Propellers: 2-bladed wooden

Performance

- Maximum speed: 200 mph (320 km/h, 170 kn)
- Cruise speed: 150 mph (240 km/h, 130 kn)
- Stall speed: 50 mph (80 km/h, 43 kn)
- Range: 400 mi (640 km, 350 nmi)
- Service ceiling: 20,000 ft (6,100 m)
- Rate of climb: 2,100 ft/min (11 m/s)
- Wing loading: 9.8 lb/sq ft (48 kg/m^{2})

== See also ==
- List of aerobatic aircraft
